= 1840 in Belgium =

- Decades: 1830s; 1840s; 1850s; 1860s
- See also: Other events of 1840; List of years in Belgium

Events in the year 1840 in Belgium.

== Incumbents ==
- Monarch: Leopold I
- Prime Minister: Barthélémy de Theux de Meylandt (to 18 April); Joseph Lebeau (from 18 April)

== Events ==
- 29 March – Treaty of amity and navigation with the United States signed but never ratified.
- 18 April – Liberal ministry under Joseph Lebeau comes to power.
- 25 May – Provincial elections
- 30 May – Parliament considers petitions for Dutch to be made an official language, organised by Ferdinand Augustijn Snellaert and Jean-Baptist David.
- 4 June – Botanical Garden of Mechelen opens, with Joseph Van Hoorde as head gardener.
- 10 August – Culmination of the Fortsas hoax in Binche.
- 15 August – City of Antwerp festively marks the bicentenary of the death of Peter Paul Rubens.

== Publications ==
Periodicals

- Almanach royal de Belgique (Brussels, Librairie Polytechnique)
- Annuaire de la Bibliothèque Royale de Belgique
- Annuaire dramatique de la Belgique, 2
- Archives de la médecine belge
- Messager des sciences historiques
- Pasinomie: Collection complète des lois, décrets, arrêtés et règlements généraux qui peuvent être invoqués en Belgique, series 2, 1822-1824 (Brussels, Société Typographique Belge)
- La renaissance: Chronique des arts et de la littérature begins publication under the auspices of the Association Nationale pour Favoriser les Arts en Belgique.
- Revue de Bruxelles, 4
- Revue nationale de Belgique

Exhibitions

- Exposition publique de la Société royale d'agriculture et de botanique à Gand (Ghent, D. J. Vanderhaeghen-Hulin)

Guidebooks and directories

- Indicateur belge, ou Guide commercial et industriel (Brussels, Bauchard-Rinche)
- Alexandre Ferrier de Tourettes, Belgium Historical and Picturesque, translated by Henry Robert Addison (Brussels)
- Alexandre Ferrier de Tourettes, Handbook for Travellers on the Belgian Rail-Road (Brussels)

Monographs

- P. Namur, Histoire des bibliothèques publiques de la Belgique (Brussels, F. Parent)

Literature

- Maria Doolaeghe, Madelieven
- Jules de Saint-Genois, Le Faux Baudouin

== Births ==
- 3 January – Father Damien, missionary (died 1889)
- 11 April – Paul Janson, politician (died 1913)
- 7 June – Charlotte of Belgium, Empress of Mexico (died 1927)
- 11 June – Henri de Braekeleer, painter (died 1888)

== Deaths ==
- 4 February – Angélique de Rouillé (born 1756), writer
- 20 March – Jan Frans van Dael (born 1764), painter
- 9 June – John Cockerill (born 1790), industrialist
- 19 June – Pierre-Joseph Redouté (born 1759), botanical painter

Date unknown

- Jeanne-Marie Artois (born 1762), brewer
