= 1843 in Belgium =

- Decades: 1830s; 1840s; 1850s; 1860s
- See also: Other events of 1843; List of years in Belgium

Map of completed and planned railway connections across Belgium, the Netherlands and Germany

Events in the year 1843 in Belgium.

== Incumbents ==
- Monarch: Leopold I
- Prime Minister: Jean-Baptiste Nothomb

== Events ==
Boundary marker along the border between Belgium and Luxembourg (1843)

- Pierre-Joseph van Beneden establishes the world's first marine laboratory in Ostend
- 12 June – Parliamentary elections
- 21 July – Antwerp Zoo established
- 7 August – Border convention between Belgium and the Luxembourg concluded at Maastricht.
- 8 August – Treaty of Maastricht: border convention between Belgium and the Netherlands.
- 15 October – Official opening of the Antwerp–Cologne railway, the first "Iron Rhine"

== Art and architecture ==
Théâtre Royal de Mons, opened 18 October 1843

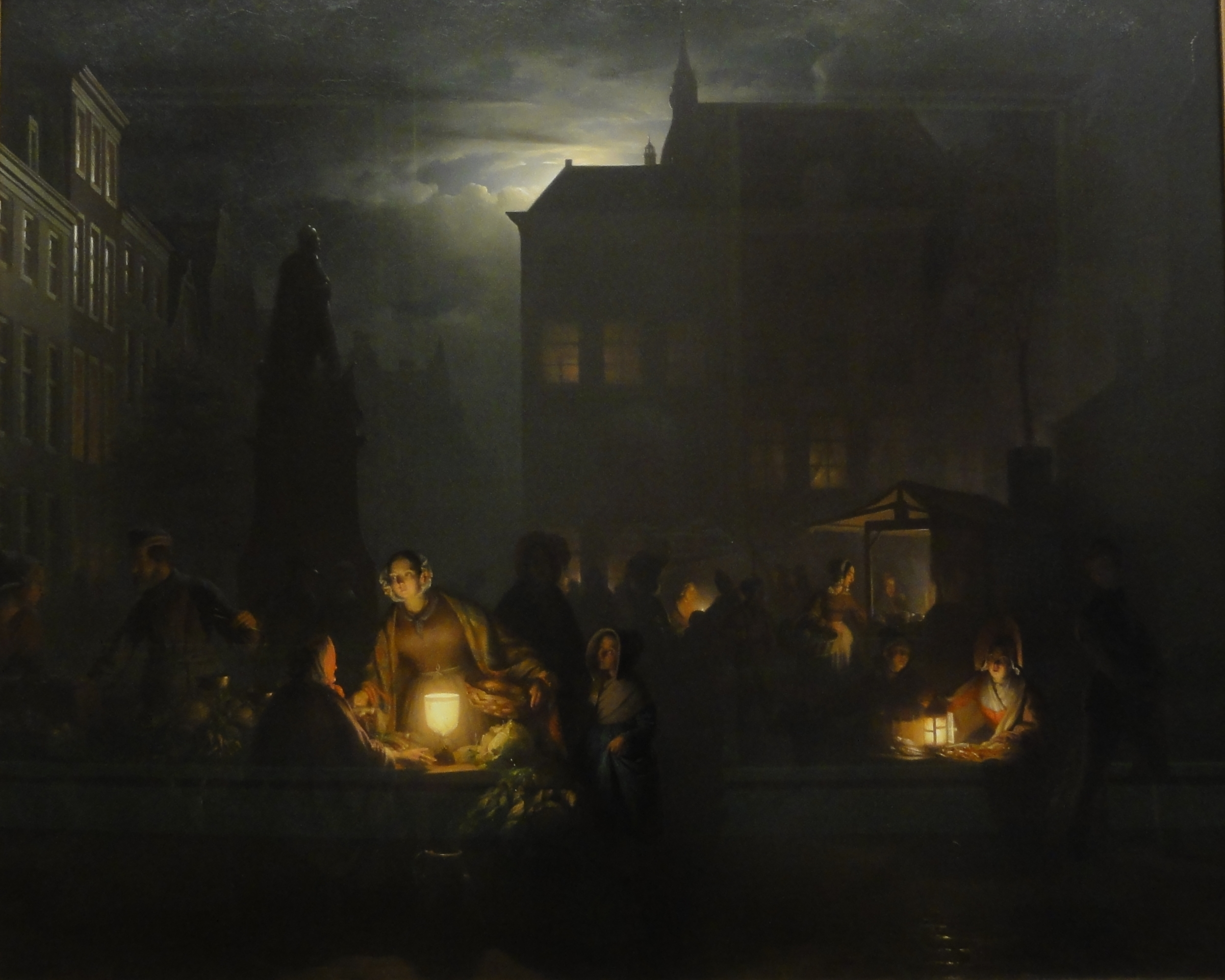
Petrus van Schendel, Night Market in Antwerp, 1843 (Neue Pinakothek)

Buildings

- Théâtre Royal de Mons, opened 18 October

Paintings

- Petrus van Schendel, Night Market in Antwerp

== Publications ==
Periodicals

- Almanach royal de Belgique (Brussels, Librairie Polytechnique)
- La Belgique judiciaire: gazette des tribunaux belges et étrangers
- Bulletin et Annales de l'Académie d'Archéologie de Belgique begins publication.
- Journal historique et littéraire, vol. 10 (Liège, Pierre Kersten)
- La renaissance: Chronique des arts et de la littérature, 4.
- Revue de Bruxelles changes title to Nouvelle Revue de Bruxelles.
- Revue nationale de Belgique, Vol. 9

Monographs and reports

- État de l'instruction moyenne en Belgique, 1830-1842
- Notice statistique sur les Journaux Belges: 1830-1842
- Edward Dobson, An Historical, Statistical, and Scientific Account of the Railways of Belgium from 1834 to 1842 (London, John Weale)
- Charles Marcellis, Coup d'oeuil sur la Belgique en 1843
- Laurent Remacle, Dictionnaire wallon-français, vol. 2
- Pierre-Joseph Van Beneden, Recherches sur l'embryogénie des tubulaires
- Pierre-Joseph Van Beneden, Mémoire sur les campanulaires de la côte d'Ostende

Literature

- Henry Robert Addison, Belgium as she is (Brussels and Leipzig, C. Muquardt)
- Le Bibliophile Jacob (pseudonym), Galerie des Femmes de George Sand, illustrated by H. Robinson (Brussels, Haumann)
- Hendrik Conscience, Hoe men schilder wordt
- Hendrik Conscience, Wat een Moeder lijden kan

== Births ==
- 18 March – Jules Vandenpeereboom, politician (died 1917)
- 26 April – Paul de Vigne, sculptor (died 1901)
- 13 May – Paul de Smet de Naeyer, politician (died 1913)
- 27 June – Théodore Bernier, antiquarian (died 1893)
- 25 July – Edmond Hanssens, colonial administrator (died 1884)
- 19 September – Charles van der Stappen, sculptor (died 1910)

== Deaths ==
- 2 March – François-Joseph-Philippe de Riquet (born 1771), prince of Chimay
- 12 December – William I of the Netherlands (born 1772), former head of state
