= 1846 in Belgium =

- Decades: 1830s; 1840s; 1850s; 1860s
- See also: Other events of 1846; List of years in Belgium

Events in the year 1846 in Belgium.

== Incumbents ==
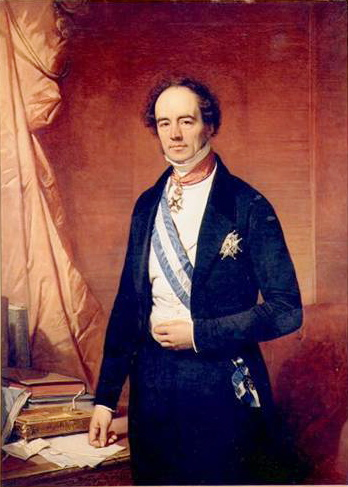
Barthélémy de Theux de Meylandt, Prime Minister 1834–1840, 1846–1847, 1871-1874

- Monarch: Leopold I
- Prime Minister: Sylvain Van de Weyer (to 31 March); Barthélémy de Theux de Meylandt (from 31 March)

== Events ==
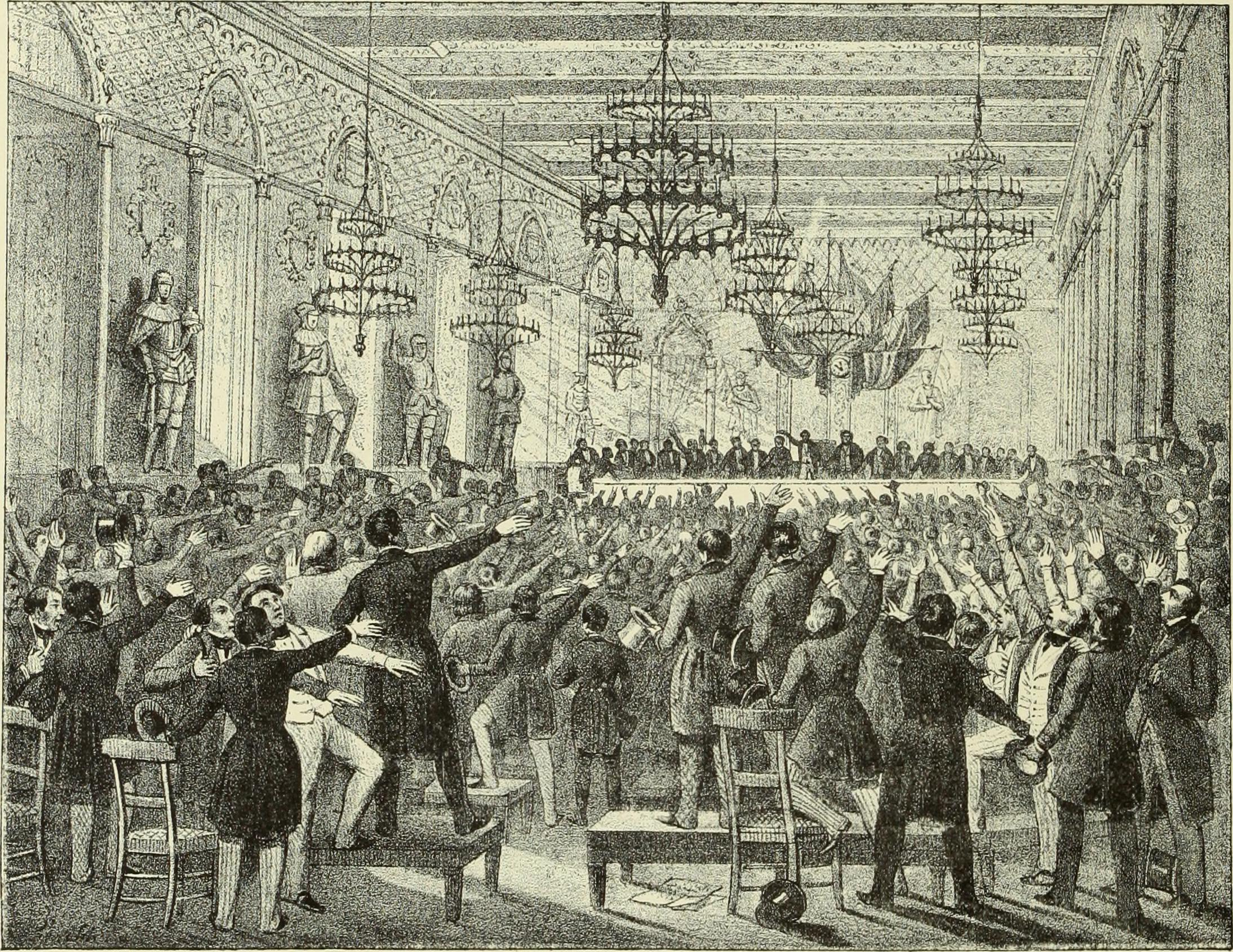
Liberal Congress, 14 June 1846

- 21 March – Achel Priory founded as a filiation from Westmalle Abbey.
- 25 May – Provincial elections
- 14 June – Founding congress of the Liberal Party.
- 29 July – Commercial treaty with the Netherlands.

== Art and architecture ==
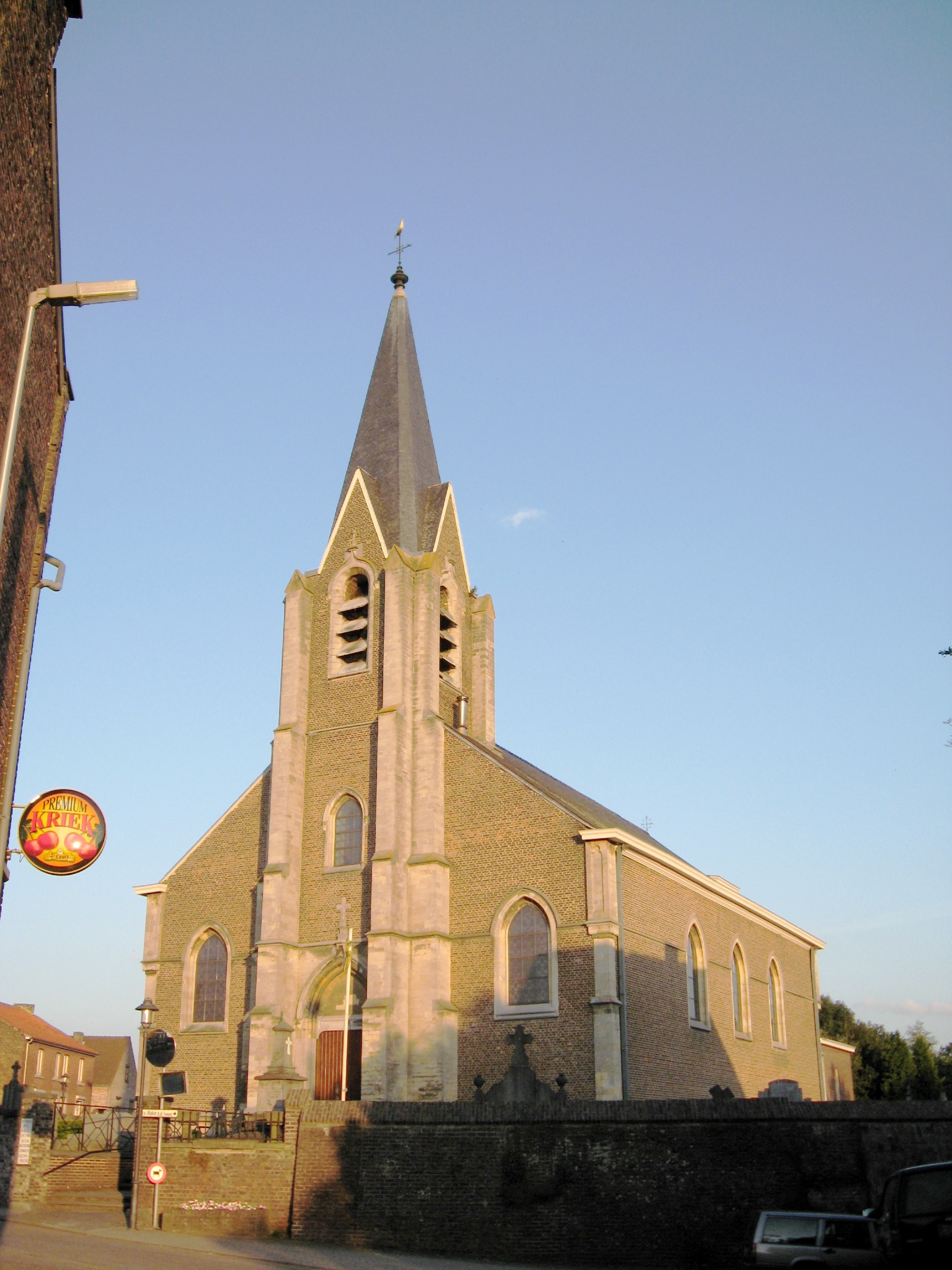
Church of the Finding of the Holy Cross, Mal (completed 1846)

Buildings

- 6 May — Work begins on Galeries Royales Saint-Hubert, designed by Jean-Pierre Cluysenaar
- Church of the Finding of the Holy Cross, Mal, completed, replacing a medieval structure

== Publications ==
Periodicals

- Annales parlementaires de Belgique.
- Messager des sciences historiques (Ghent, Léonard Hebbelynck).
- La renaissance: Chronique des arts et de la littérature, 7.
- Revue de Belgique begins publication
- Revue de Bruxelles reverts to its original title.

Monographs and reports

- Rapport triennial sur la situation de l'instruction primaire en Belgique (Brussels, 1846)

Guidebooks and directories

- A. Hochsteyn, Dictionnaire-postal de la Belgique, 2 vols.
- A Week in Brussels: The Stranger's Guide to the Capital of Belgium, 3rd edition (London, Edwards and Hughes; Brussels, Edward Browne)

Literature

- Karel Lodewijk Ledeganck, Drie Zustersteden.
- Jules de Saint-Genois, Le château de Wildenborg, ou les mutinés du siége d'Ostende (1604) (2 vols., Brussels, A. van Dale).

== Births ==
- 24 January – Isidore Verheyden, painter (died 1905)
- 28 February – Jean de la Hoese, painter (died 1917)
- 5 March – Edouard Van Beneden, biologist (died 1910)
- 27 April – Charles Joseph Van Depoele, electrical engineer (died 1892)
- 2 June – Émile Storms, soldier (died 1918)
- 9 August – François J. Terby, astronomer (died 1911)
- 10 August
  - Eugène Goblet d'Alviella, politician (died 1925)
  - Leon Van der Rest, banker (died 1932)
- 16 September – Marie Popelin, feminist (died 1913)
- 19 November – Emile Wauters, painter (died 1933)

== Deaths ==
- 24 June – Jan Frans Willems (born 1793), writer
- 1 July – Auguste Duvivier (born 1772), politician
- 8 October – Henri van der Haert (born 1790), painter
- 29 October – Jean-Louis van Aelbroeck (born 1755), agronomist
