= 1842 in Belgium =

- Decades: 1830s; 1840s; 1850s; 1860s
- See also: Other events of 1842; List of years in Belgium

Events in the year 1842 in Belgium.

== Incumbents ==
- Monarch: Leopold I
- Prime Minister: Jean-Baptiste Nothomb

== Events ==
- Royal Academy of Archaeology of Belgium founded.
- 23 May – Provincial elections
- 16 July – "Linen convention" exempts Belgian textiles from French protectionist measures in return for a reduction in the Belgian tariff on French wines.
- 23 September – Education Act stipulates that each local authority must maintain at least one primary school.
- 5 November – Belgian-Dutch convention on trade and inland navigation signed in The Hague.

== Publications ==
Periodicals

- Almanach royal de Belgique (Brussels, Librairie Polytechnique)
- Annuaire politique, écclésiastique, judiciaire, noliaire, militaire, administratif et commercial de la Belgique (Brussels, Librairie Polytechnique)
- Messager des sciences historiques (Ghent)
- La renaissance: Chronique des arts et de la littérature, 3.
- Revue de Bruxelles

Monographs and reports

- Statistique de la Belgique: 1831–40 (Brussels)
- Les femmes de Walter Scott (Brussels, Société Belge de Librairie)
- Théodore Juste, Histoire de Belgique (Brussels, Alexandre Jamar)
- Isaac-Joseph De Meyer, Origine des apothicaires de Bruges
- Edmond de Sélys Longchamps, Faune belge: Indication méthodique des mammifères, oiseaux, reptiles et poissons observés jusqu'ici en Belgique, vol. 1

== Births ==
- 7 May – Isala Van Diest, physician (died 1916)
- 24 August – Edouard Agneessens, painter (died 1885)
- 6 December – Marie Collart, painter (died 1911)

== Deaths ==
- 10 March – Joseph Van Crombrugghe (born 1770), politician
- 6 September – Jean-Baptiste Van Mons (born 1765), pomologist
