= 1844 in Belgium =

- Decades: 1830s; 1840s; 1850s; 1860s
- See also: Other events of 1844; List of years in Belgium

Events in the year 1844 in Belgium.

== Incumbents ==
- Monarch: Leopold I
- Prime Minister: Jean-Baptiste Nothomb

== Events ==
- 1 January

- Royal decree establishes spelling rules for Dutch in Belgium.
- Vlaemsch België, first Dutch-language daily newspaper in Belgium, launched.

- 6 February – Conseil héraldique de Belgique established
- 27 May – Provincial elections
- 19 October – Postal convention between Britain and Belgium signed in London.

undated

- Belgian Pontifical College established

== Publications ==
Periodicals

- Annales de la Société royale des beaux-arts et de littérature de Gand
- Annuaire de l'Académie royale des sciences et belles-lettres de Bruxelles, 10
- Annuaire de l'état militaire de Belgique
- Gazette médicale belge
- Messager des sciences historiques
- Nouvelle Revue de Bruxelles
- La Renaissance: Chronique des arts et de la littérature, 5.

Official publications

- Convention de limites entre la Belgique et les Pays-Bas, conclue à Maestricht le 8 aout 1843 (Brussels, Imprimerie du Moniteur Belge, 1844)
- État de l'instruction supérieure en Belgique (Brussels, M. Devroye)
- Pasicrisie belge: recueil général de la jurisprudence des cours (Brussels, Société Typographique Belge)

Others

- Auguste Baron, La Belgique monumentale, historique et pittoresque (Brussels, A. Jamar & Ch. Hen)
- Victor Coremans, L'année de l'ancienne Belgique (Brussels, Commission royale d'Histoire)
- Pierre de Decker, Études historiques et critiques sur les monts-de-piété en Belgique (Brussels, Société des Beaux-Arts)
- Laurent-Guillaume de Koninck, Description des animaux fossiles qui se trouvent dans le terrain carbonifère de Belgique (Liège, H. Dessain)
- Jules de Saint-Genois, Anna: historisch tafereel uit de Vlaemsche geschiedenis tydens Maria van Bourgonje
- Jean-Joseph Thonissen, Constitution belge annotée (Hasselt, P.-F. Milis)
- Alphonse Wauters, Les délices de la Belgique (Brussels, Société des Beaux-Arts)

== Births ==
- 24 March – Camille Lemonnier, writer (died 1913)
- 10 April – Jules de Burlet, politician (died 1897)
- 27 April – Théophile Wahis, colonial governor (died 1921)
- 3 June – Paul Mansion, mathematician (died 1919)
- 21 November – Jenny Minne-Dansaert, lacemaker (died 1909)
- 16 December – Victor Chauvin, Orientalist (died 1913)

== Deaths ==
- 13 April – Frédéric Théodore Faber (born 1782), painter
- 14 October – Jan Baptiste de Jonghe (born 1785), painter
