= 1845 in Belgium =

- Decades: 1830s; 1840s; 1850s; 1860s
- See also: Other events of 1845; List of years in Belgium

Events in the year 1845 in Belgium.

== Incumbents ==
- Monarch: Leopold I
- Prime Minister: Jean-Baptiste Nothomb (to 30 July); Sylvain Van de Weyer (from 30 July)

== Events ==
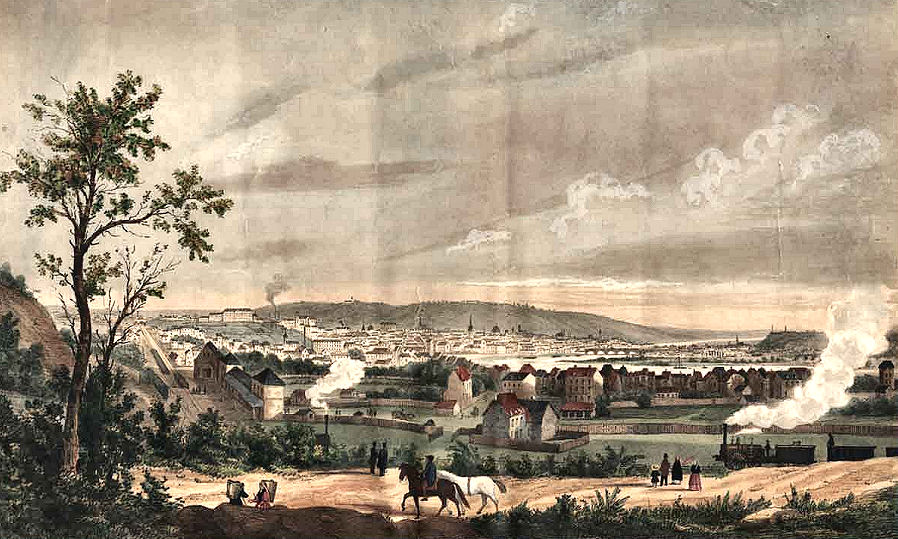
A view of Liège (1845)

- 10 June – partial legislative election
- 16 September – Parliament meets in extraordinary session to debate responses to the failure of the potato crop
- 10 November – Commercial treaty with the United States signed by Thomas Green Clemson and Adolphe Deschamps in Brussels.

== Publications ==
Periodicals

- Almanach de poche de Bruxelles (Brussels, M. E. Rampelbergh)
- Almanach royal de Belgique (Brussels, Librairie Polytechnique)
- Annales de la Société royale des beaux-arts et de littérature de Gand
- Annales parlementaires de Belgique, part 1, part 2.
- Annuaire de l'Université Catholique de Louvain, vol. 9 (Leuven: Vanlinthout & Vandenzande).
- Le bibliophile belge begins publication.
- Bulletin de l'Académie royale de médecine de Belgique, vol. 4.
- Compte-rendu des séances de la commission royale d'histoire, vols. 9 and 10
- Journal de l'Instruction publique begins publication.
- Messager des sciences historiques (Ghent, Léonard Hebbelynck)
- Nouvelle Revue de Bruxelles
- La renaissance: Chronique des arts et de la littérature, 6.

Studies and reports

- Désiré Arnould, Situation administrative et financière des monts-de-piété en Belgique (Brussels, Imprimerie du Moniteur Belge)
- Giovanni Arrivabene, Sur la condition des laboureurs et des ouvriers belges (Brussels, Meline, Cans & co.)
- Adolphe Jullien, Notes diverses sur les chemins de fer: en Angleterre, en Belgique et en France (Paris, Carilian-Goeury & V. Dalmont)

Others

- Les Belges illustres, vol. 3
- Hendrik Conscience, De Geschiedenis van België (Antwerp, J.-E. Buschmann, and Brussels, Alex Jamar).
- Lieven Everwyn, Korte levensschets van Jacob Van Artevelde (Ghent)
- Guillaume Tell Poussin, La Belgique et les Belges depuis 1830 (Paris, W. Couquebert)

== Births ==
- 24 January – Albert Desenfans, sculptor (died 1938)
- 27 January – Karel Ooms, painter (died 1900)
- 9 February – Henri Gondry, colonial administrator (died 1889)
- 25 February – Eugène Goossens, père, conductor (died 1906)
- 5 March – Alphonse Hasselmans, composer (died 1912)
- 13 June – Alphonse-Jules Wauters, writer and editor (died 1916)
- 24 June – Georges Nagelmackers, engineer and entrepreneur (died 1905)
- 9 August – Xavier Mellery, painter (died 1921)
- 17 November – Princess Marie of Hohenzollern-Sigmaringen, mother of Albert I of Belgium (died 1912)
- 2 December – Évariste Carpentier, painter (died 1922)

== Deaths ==
- 3 January – Philippus Jacobus Brepols (born 1778), entrepreneur
- 23 March – Dominique II Berger (born 1780), carillonneur
- 20 July – Alexandre Artôt (born 1815), violinist
