= 1847 in Belgium =

- Decades: 1830s; 1840s; 1850s; 1860s
- See also: Other events of 1847; List of years in Belgium

Events in the year 1847 in Belgium.

== Incumbents ==
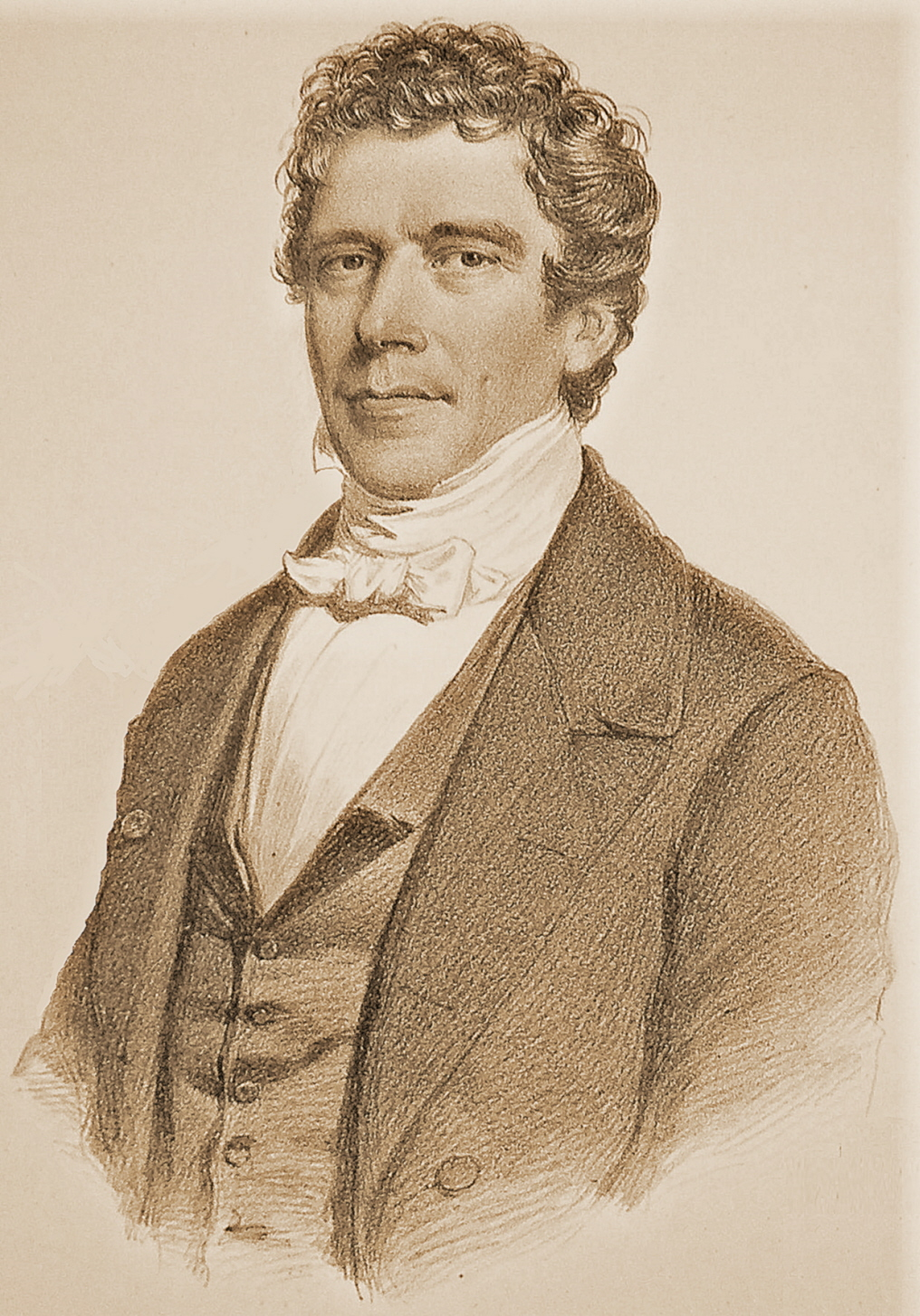
Charles Rogier, Prime Minister 1847–1852 and 1857–1868

- Monarch: Leopold I
- Prime Minister: Barthélémy de Theux de Meylandt (to 12 August); Charles Rogier (from 12 August)

== Events ==
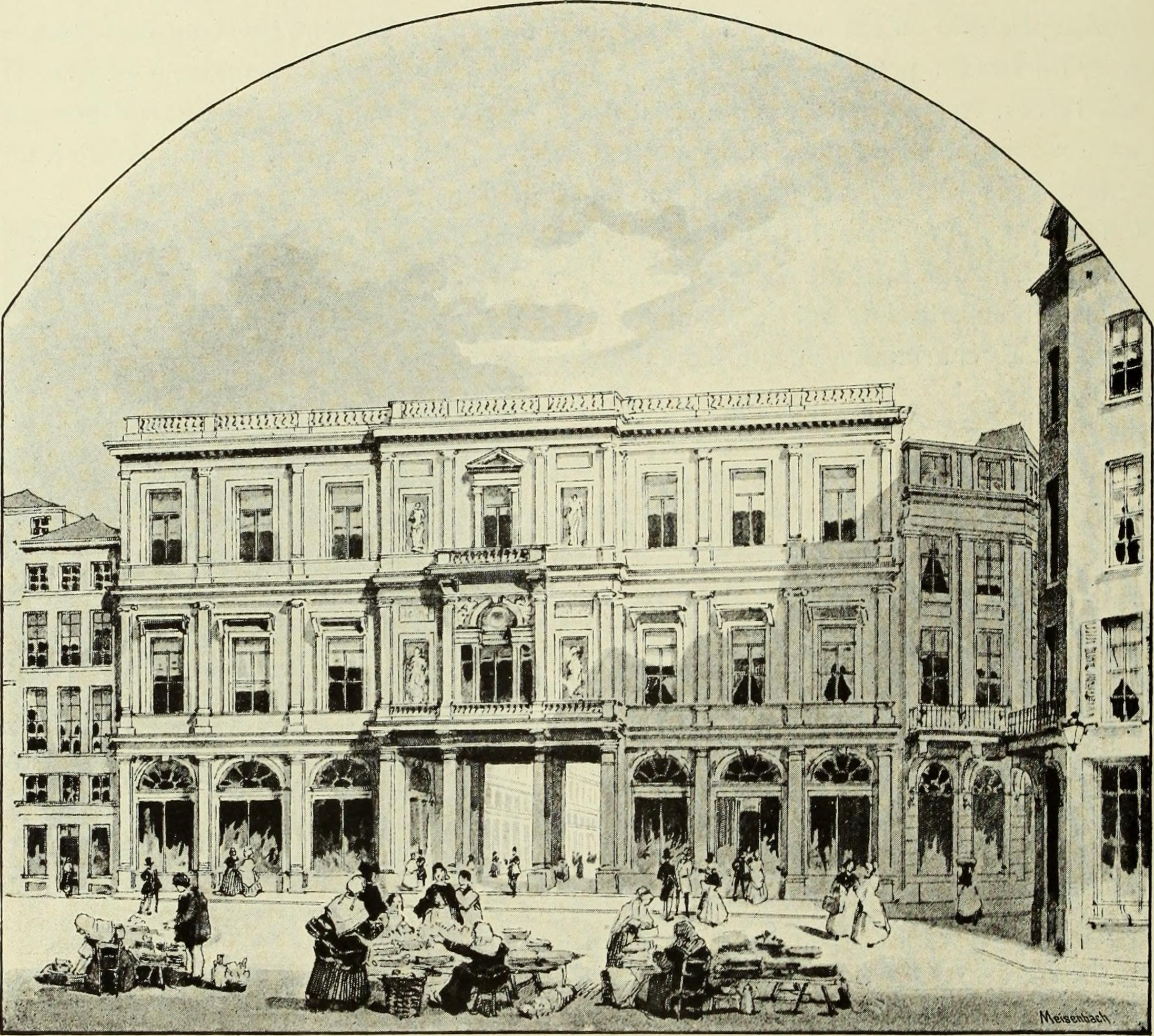
A 19th-century view of the Galeries Royales Saint-Hubert, opened 20 June 1847

- 6 April – Law on "offences against the king" provides for prison sentences from 6 months to 3 years and fines of between 300 and 3000 francs for threats and insults against the head of state.
- 7 June – Théâtre des Galeries opens in Brussels.
- 8 June – Partial legislative elections.
- 20 June – Galeries Royales Saint-Hubert shopping arcade opened in Brussels.
- 1 July – Opening of the Exposition des produits de l'industrie nationale in Brussels.
- 9 August – Antwerp–Ghent railway line completed.
- 27 September – Premonstratensians return to Postel Abbey.

== Publications ==
Periodicals

- Annales parlementaires de Belgique
- Bulletins de l'Académie Royale des Sciences, des Lettres et des Beaux-Arts de Belgique (Brussels, M. Hayez), vol. 14.
- Messager des sciences historiques (Ghent, Léonard Hebbelynck).
- Revue de Bruxelles

Exhibitions

- J.B.A.M. Jobard, Exposition de l'industrie Belge 1847
- Catalogue des produits de l'industrie belge admis à l'exposition de 1847

Scholarship

- André Dumont, Mémoire sur les terrains Ardennais et Rhénan de l'Ardenne, du Rhin, du Brabant et du Condros (Brussels, Hayez)
- Émile Louis Victor de Laveleye, L'Histoire des rois francs

Literature

- Tegenwoordig België (Liberalen, Katholyken en Vlaemsche-beweging) door Een' Noord-Nederlander beoordeeld (Ghent, Snoeck-Ducaju en zoon); reprinted from De Gids.
- Hippoliet Van Peene, "De Vlaamse Leeuw", song set to music by Karel Miry
- Hippoliet Van Peene, Willem van Dampierre, historical drama

== Art and architecture ==
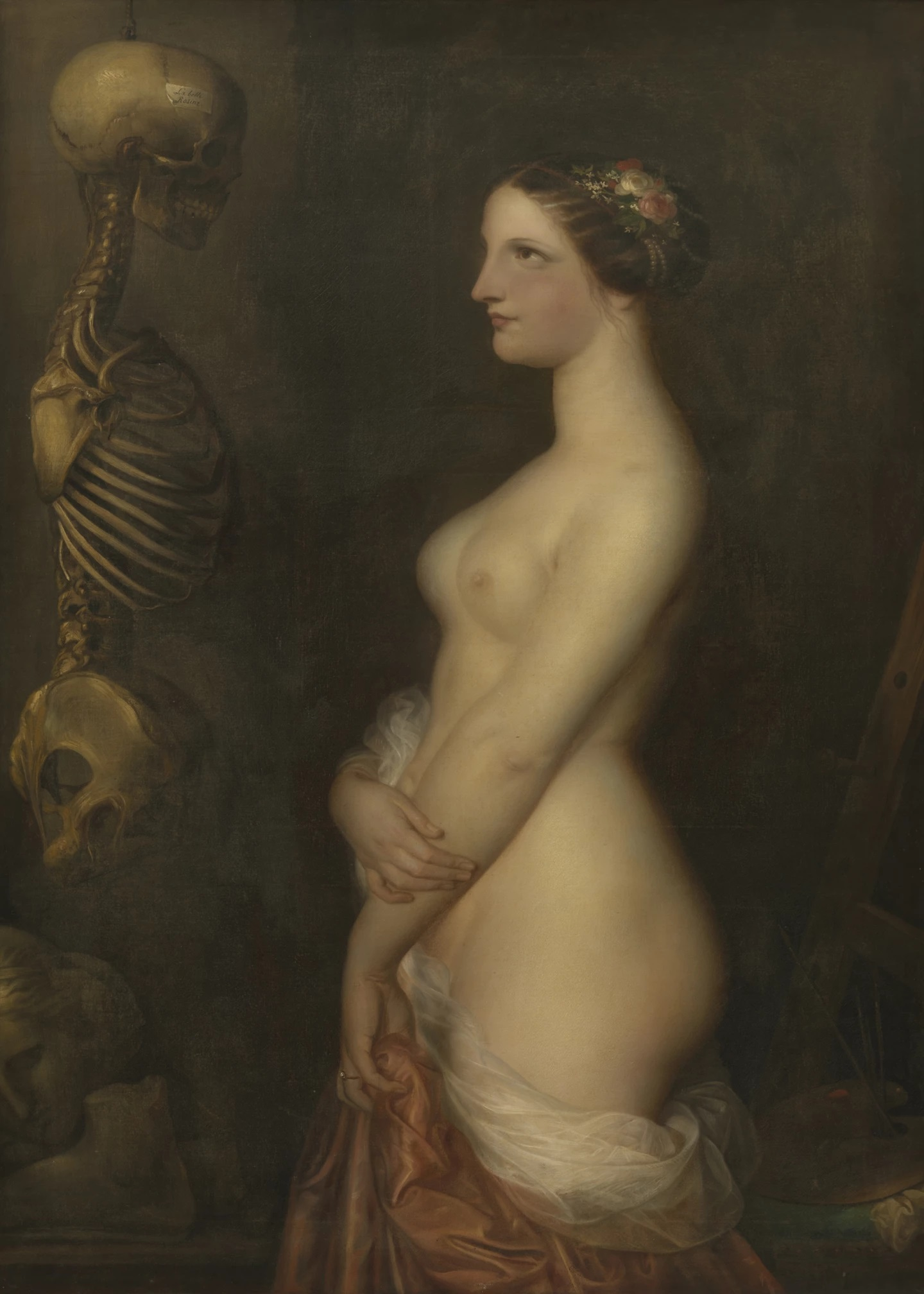
Antoine Wiertz, La Belle Rosine (1847)

Buildings

- Jean-Pierre Cluysenaar's Galeries Royales Saint-Hubert completed

Paintings

- Antoine Wiertz, La Belle Rosine

== Births ==
- 9 March – Martin Pierre Marsick, composer (died 1924)
- 9 April – Léon Mignon, sculptor (died 1898)
- 11 May – Godefroid Kurth, historian (died 1916)
- 27 August – Édouard Descamps, jurist and politician (died 1933)
- 31 August – Arthur Verhaegen, architect and politician (died 1917)
- 3 October – Frantz Jourdain, architect (died 1935)

== Deaths ==
- 19 March – Karel Lodewijk Ledeganck (born 1805), writer
- 4 April – Julie du Bosch (born 1797), social reformer
