= 1848 in Belgium =

- Decades: 1830s; 1840s; 1850s; 1860s
- See also: Other events of 1848; List of years in Belgium

Events in the year 1848 in Belgium.

== Incumbents ==
Monarch: Leopold I
Head of government: Charles Rogier

== Events ==
- 24 February – Belgium accedes to the 1841 Treaty for the Suppression of the African Slave Trade.
- 4 March – Karl Marx deported from Belgium
- 29 March – Risquons-Tout incident: Belgian troops disperse a revolutionary republican force entering the country from France.
- 13 June – General election
- 12 July - Provincial elections
- 8 October – Convention with the French Second Republic and the Kingdom of Prussia regulating customs declarations on international rail services signed in Brussels.
- 3 November – Postal convention with the United Kingdom of Great Britain and Ireland signed in Brussels.

== Publications ==
Periodicals

- Annales de l'Académie Royale d'Archéologie de Belgique, 5
- Bulletin de l'Académie Royale de Médecine de Belgique, 7
- Journal d'horticulture pratique ou Guide des amateurs et jardiniers, 5 (Brussels, F. Parent)
- Pasicrisie belge: recueil général de la jurisprudence, 3rd series, part 1 (Brussels, Meline, Cans & co.)
- Revue belge de numismatique et de sigillographie, 4

Books

- Dystorie van Saladine, edited by Constant-Philippe Serrure (Ghent, Maetschappy der Vlaemsche Bibliophilen, 1848)
- Jean-Baptiste Malou, Recherches historiques et critiques sur le véritable auteur de l'Imitation de Jésus-Christ (Brussels, 1848).
- Charles Henri Marcellis, Considérations sur les révolutions de 1848, au point de vue belge (Brussels, Meline, Cans & co.)
- C. Poplimont, La Belgique depuis mil huit cent trente (Brussels and Leipzig, Mayer & Flatau)

== Art and architecture ==
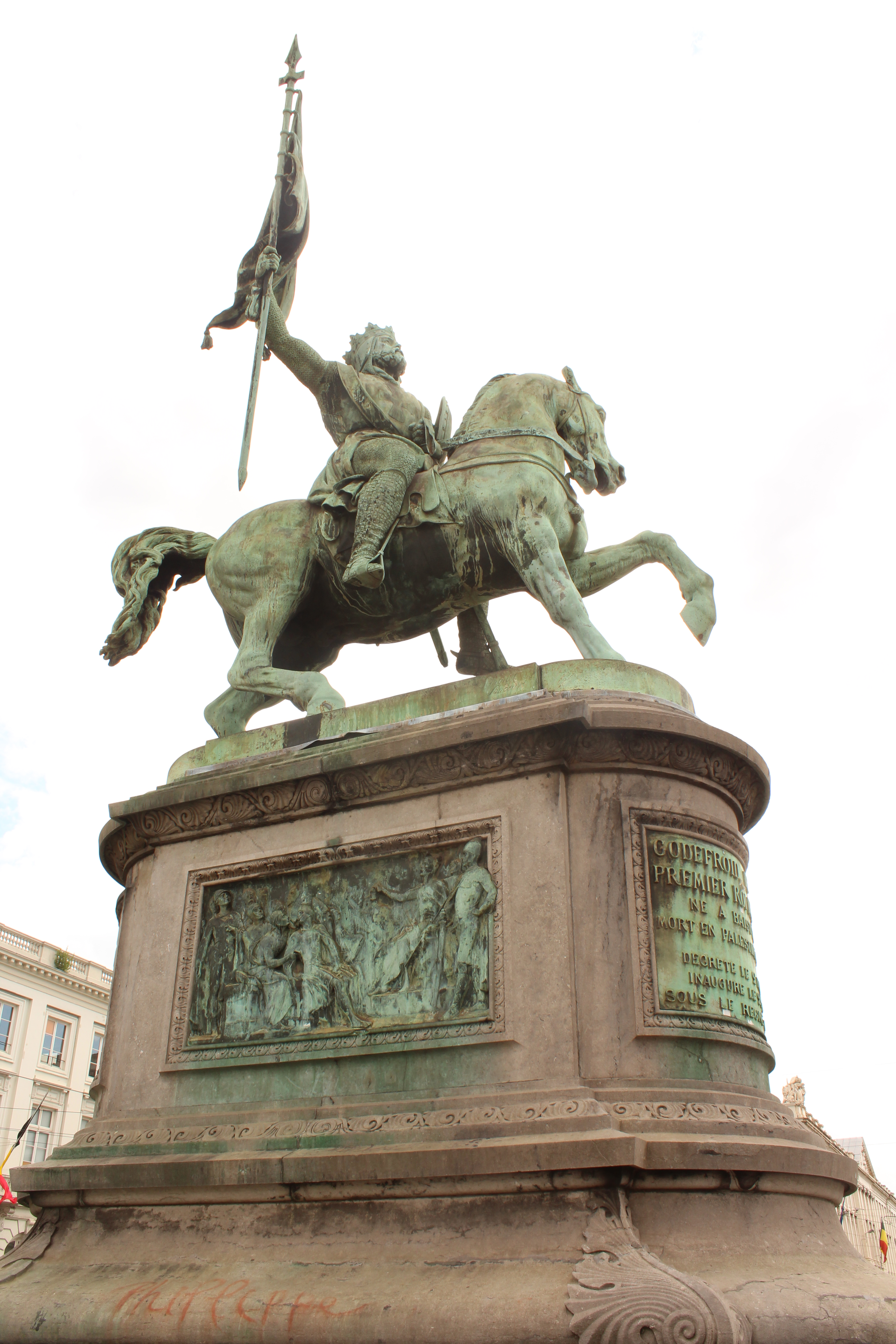
Eugène Simonis, Equestrian statue of Godfrey of Bouillon, Place Royale, Brussels

Buildings

- Bortier Gallery, Brussels

Paintings

- Louis Gallait, The Fisherman's Family

Sculpture

- Guillaume Geefs's Le génie du mal installed in Liège Cathedral
- Eugène Simonis, Equestrian statue of Godrfey of Bouillon, Place Royale, Brussels, inaugurated on 15 August

== Births ==
- 10 February – Anna Boch, painter (died 1936)
- 25 April – Alphonse van Gèle, soldier (died 1939)
- 14 June – Théophile Lybaert, artist (died 1927)
- 22 June – Julien Liebaert, politician (died 1930)
- 3 July – Marie Joseph Charles, 6th Duke d'Ursel, politician (died 1903)
- 16 August – Marie de Villermont, writer (died 1925)
- 7 October – Georges Croegaert, painter (died 1923)
- 8 October – Pierre De Geyter, composer (died 1932)

== Deaths ==
- 23 March – Julien-Joseph Ducorron (born 1770), painter
- 24 April – François van Campenhout (born 1779), opera singer and composer
- 17 May – Jan Frans Eliaerts (born 1761), painter
- 1 October – François-René Boussen (born 1774), bishop of Bruges
