= 1841 in Belgium =

- Decades: 1830s; 1840s; 1850s; 1860s
- See also: Other events of 1841; List of years in Belgium

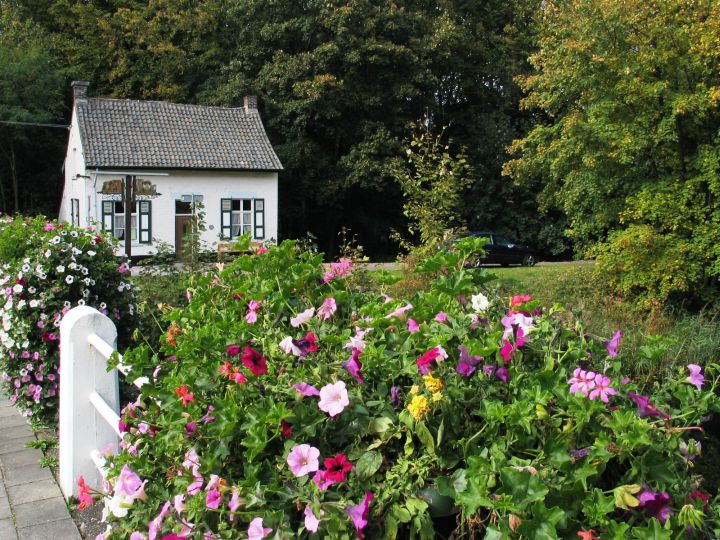
Bridge keeper's cottage, Lanklaar (built 1841)

Events in the year 1841 in Belgium.

== Incumbents ==
- Monarch: Leopold I
- Prime Minister: Joseph Lebeau (to 13 April); Jean-Baptiste Nothomb (from 13 April)

== Events ==
- 13 April – Nothomb ministry comes to power.
- 8 June – Parliamentary elections.
- 15 July – Exposition des Produits le l'Industrie Nationale opens in Brussels.
- 19 September – Founding of the Royal Academy of Medicine of Belgium.

== Publications ==
=== Periodicals ===
- Almanach de la cour
- Almanach royal de Belgique (Brussels, Librairie Polytechnique)
- Annuaire de l'Académie royale des sciences et belles-letres de Bruxelles
- Annuaire dramatique de la Belgique
- Bulletins de l'Académie Royale des Sciences, des Lettres et des Beaux-Arts de Belgique
- Journal de Bruxelles begins publication.
- Messager des sciences historiques
- La renaissance: Chronique des arts et de la littérature, 2.
- Revue belge, vol. 17 (Liège, A. Jeunehomme)
- Revue de Bruxelles

=== Monographs and reports ===
- Joseph Jean De Smet (ed.), Recueil des chroniques de Flandre, vol. 2 (Brussels, Commission royale d'Histoire)
- Xavier Heuschling, Essai sur la statistique générale de la Belgique, 2nd edition (Brussels, Etablissement Géographique)
- François Joseph Ferdinand Marchal, Histoire des Pays-Bas autrichiens (Brussels, Deprez-Parent)
- M. E. Perrot, Revue de l'exposition des produits le l'industrie nationale en 1841 (Brussels)

=== Guide books ===
- A. Ferrier, Guide pittoresque du voyageur en Belgique (3rd edition, Brussels, Société Belge de Librairie)
- James Emerson Tennent, Belgium (2 volumes, London, R. Bentley)

== Art and architecture ==
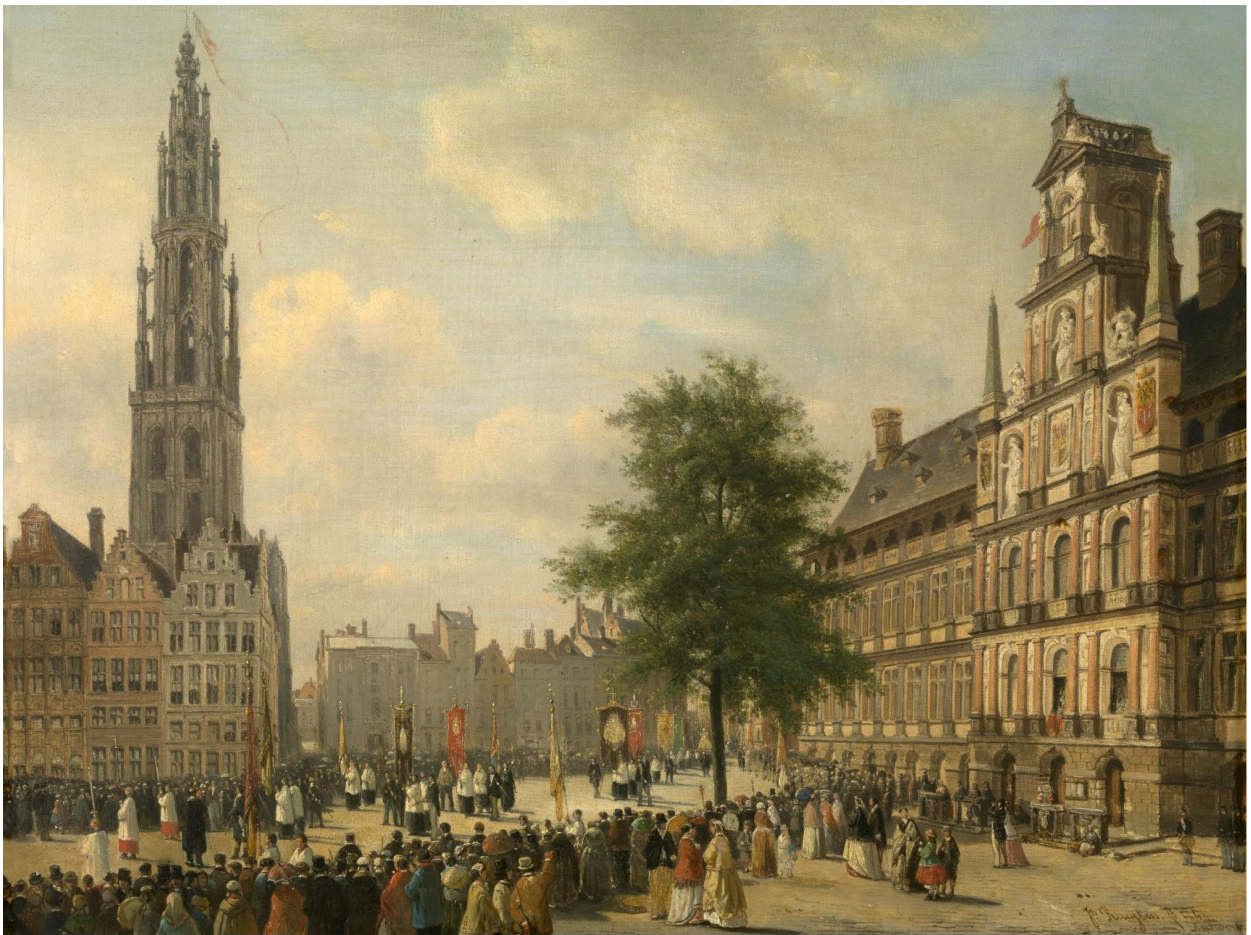
Jan Michiel Ruyten, Procession on the Grand Place of Antwerp (1841)

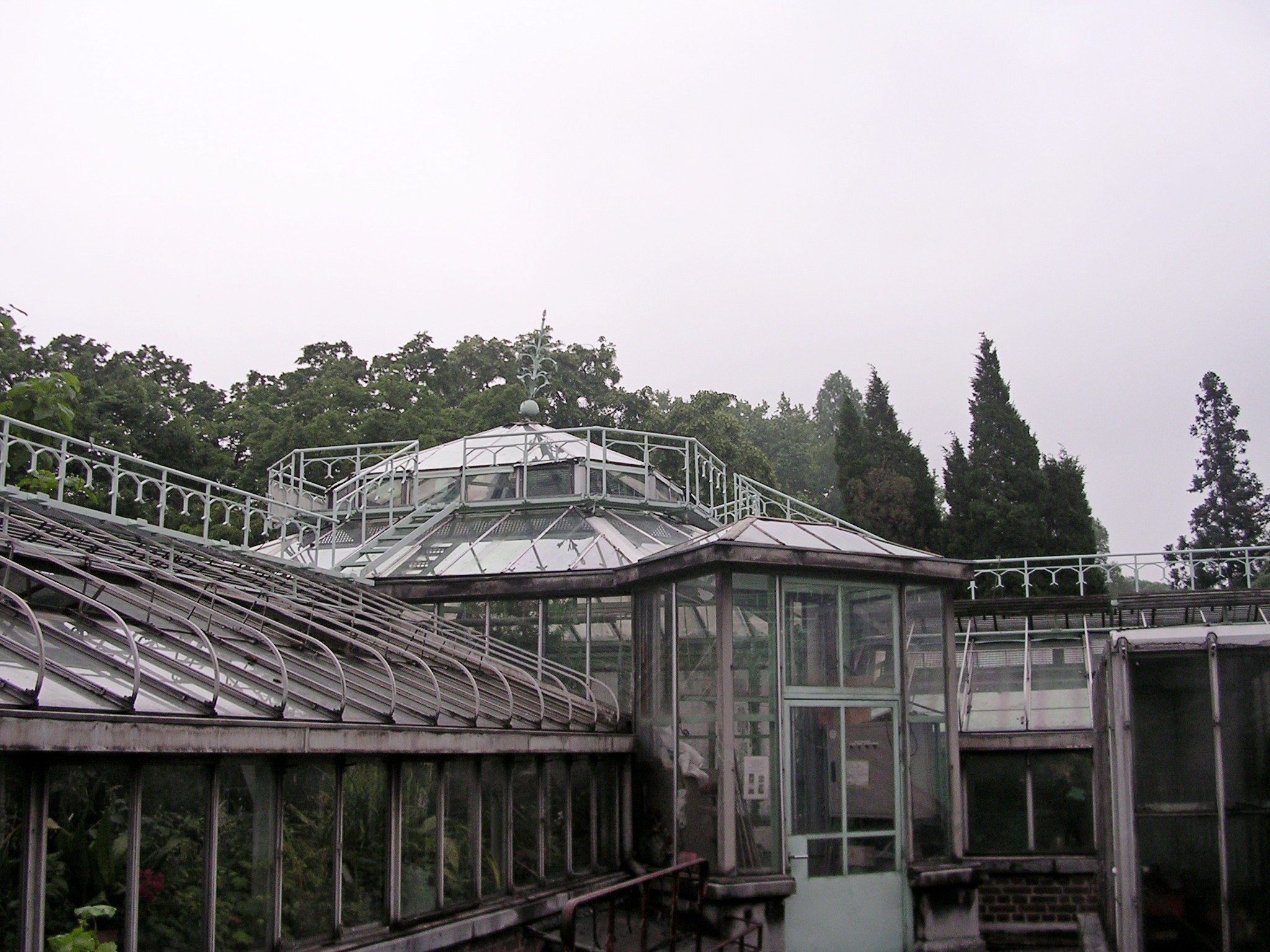
Greenhouse in the Botanical Garden of Liège (1841)

=== Paintings ===
- Louis Gallait, The Abdication of Charles V
- Antoine Wiertz, La Chute des Anges rebelles

=== Buildings ===
- Jean Baptiste De Baets, St. Stefanus, Ghent
- Greenhouses of the Botanical Garden of Liège
- Bridge keeper's cottage, Lanklaar (built 1841)

== Births ==
- 25 January – Cornelius Van Leemputten, painter (died 1902)
- 30 January – Édouard Dupont, geologist (died 1911)
- 27 April – Louis Tytgadt, painter (died 1918)
- 12 July – César De Paepe, syndicalist (died 1890)
- 12 August – Leon Van Loo, photographer (died 1907)
- 20 November – Victor D'Hondt, lawyer (died 1902)
- 6 December – Aimé Dupont, photographer (died 1900)

== Deaths ==
- 23 March – Jean-Baptiste Thorn (born 1783), politician
- 10 April – Henri Van Assche (born 1774), painter
- 28 April – Henri-Joseph van den Corput (born 1790), pharmacist
- 20 August – Constantinus Fidelio Coene (born 1780), painter
