= Corput =

Corput is a Dutch and Belgian family name. Notable persons with that name include:

- Édouard van den Corput (1821–1908), Belgian professor of medicine
- Henri-Joseph van den Corput (1790–1841), Belgian pharmacologist
- Johannes van der Corput (1890–1975), Dutch mathematician
- Max Corput (died 1911), Belgian-American architect and soldier
- Robbert van de Corput, Dutch DJ
