= 1839 in Belgium =

- Decades: 1830s; 1840s; 1850s
- See also: Other events of 1839; List of years in Belgium

Events in the year 1839 in Belgium.

== Incumbents ==
- Monarch: Leopold I
- Prime Minister: Barthélémy de Theux de Meylandt

== Events ==
- 19 April – Treaty of London guarantees Belgian independence and neutrality; Luxembourg and Limburg partitioned.
- 21 May – Royal Library of Belgium opens to the public.
- 11 June – Parliamentary elections

== Publications ==
- Maetschappy der Vlaemsche Bibliophilen founded by Constant-Philippe Serrure and Philip Blommaert as a text publication society to produce editions of medieval Flemish literature.

Periodicals

- Bibliographie de la Belgique, ou catalogue général de livres belges (Brussels, C. Muquardt)
- Revue de Bruxelles, 3.

Official publications

- Machines à vapeur: Arrêtés et instructions (Brussels, Librairie Polytechnique)

Other works

- Kronyk van Vlaenderen van 580 tot 1467 (2 vols, Ghent, Maetschappy der Vlaemsche Bibliophilen).
- Le promeneur dans Bruxelles et dans ses environs (Brussels, Société Typographique Belge)
- Mrs. Wemyss Dalrymple, The Economist's New Brussels Guide (Brussels, W. Todd)
- Louis de Potter, Révolution belge, 1828 à 1839: Souvenirs personnels (Brussels, Meline, Cans & co.)
- Joseph Jean De Smet, Abrégé de l'histoire de la Belgique, third edition (Ghent)
- Charles Piot, Histoire de Louvain (Leuven)
- Pierre Simons and Gustave Nicolas Joseph de Ridder, Le Chemin de fer belge, ou recueil des mémoires et devis pour l'établissement du chemin de fer d'Anvers et Ostende à Cologne, avec embranchement de Bruxelles et de Gand aux frontières de France, 3rd edition (Brussels, Lacross et Cie.)
- Auguste Voisin, La bataille de Woeringen: récit historique (Brussels, Société des Beaux-Arts)

== Art and architecture ==
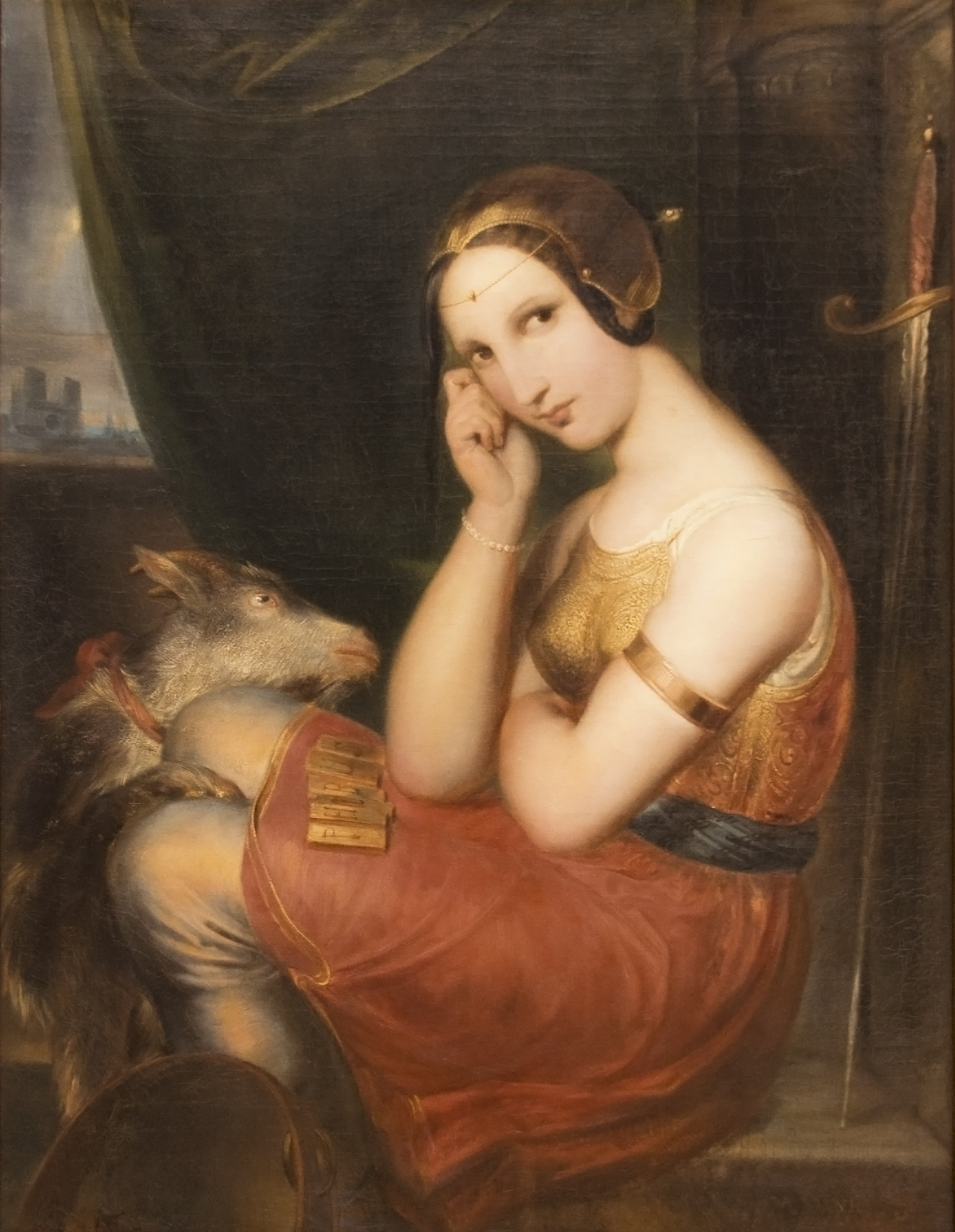
Antoine Wiertz, Esmeralda (1839)

- Antoine Wiertz, Esmeralda, Quasimodo

== Births ==
- 10 February – Max Rooses, writer and museum curator (died 1914)
- 1 March – Élie Marchal, botanist (died 1923)
- 28 July – Isabelle Gatti de Gamond, feminist educator (died 1905)
- 7 August – Charles Hermans, painter (died 1924)
- 30 August – Henri Maquet, architect (died 1909)
- 18 October – Alphonse Joseph Charles Dubois, naturalist (died 1921)
- 18 December – Adolf Daens, radical priest (died 1907)
- 26 December – Charles John Seghers, missionary bishop (died 1886)

== Deaths ==
- 9 June – Joseph Paelinck (born 1781), painter
- 7 August – Erasme Louis Surlet de Chokier (born 1769), politician
- 15 December – Mattheus Ignatius van Bree (born 1773), painter
