= 1838 in Belgium =

- Decades: 1830s; 1840s; 1850s
- See also: Other events of 1838; List of years in Belgium

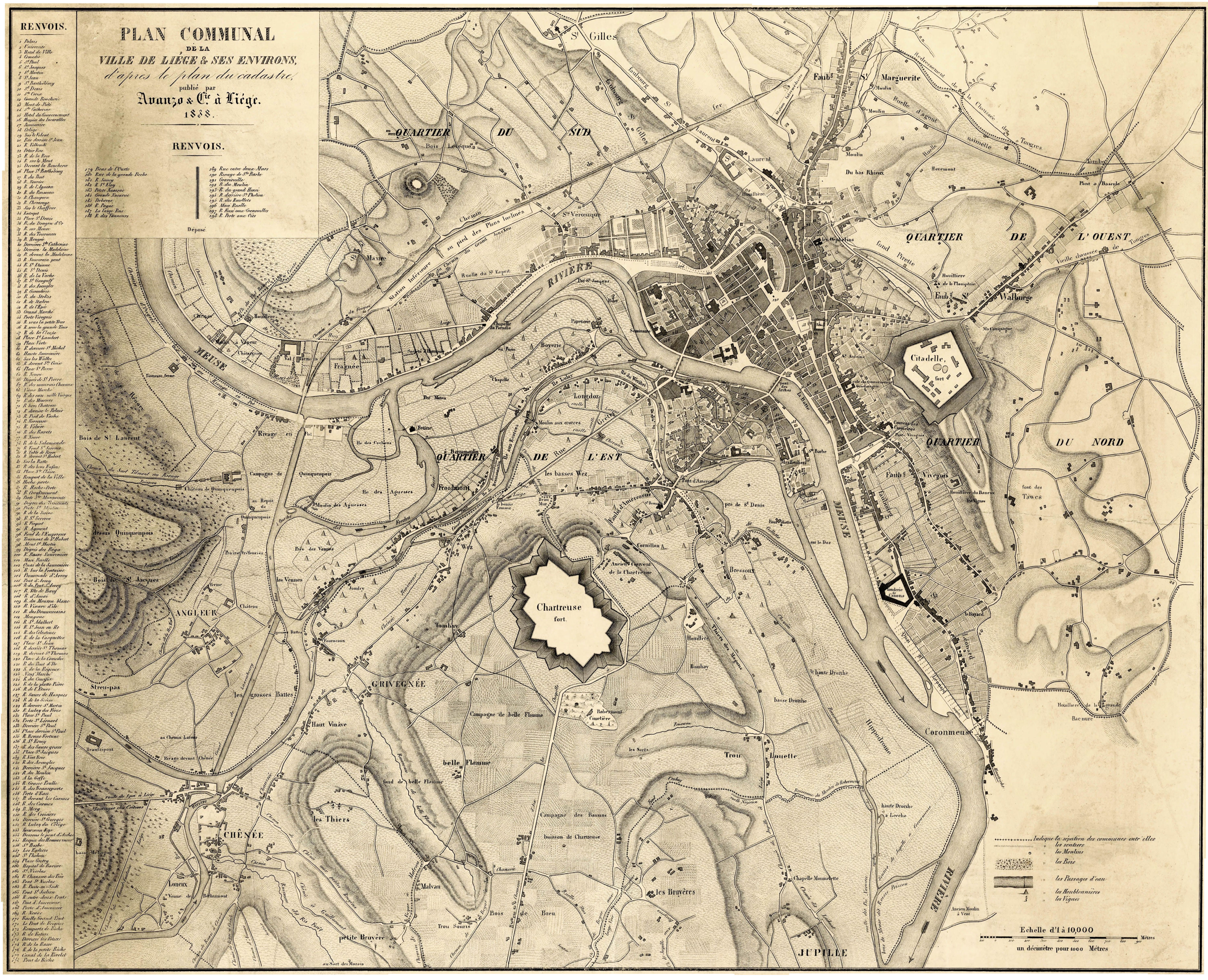
Map of the municipality of Liège, 1838

Events in the year 1838 in Belgium.

== Incumbents ==
- Monarch: Leopold I
- Prime Minister: Barthélémy de Theux de Meylandt

== Events ==
- 7 April – Tariffs raised on woollen cloth, porcelain, glass, crystal and chemical products.
- 15 May – Court of assizes to have jury verdicts.
- 28 May – Provincial elections
- 1 June – Parliament approves government loan of 2 million Belgian francs for building highways and railways.
- June – Ghent linen factories begin mechanising.
- 1 August – Westmalle Brewery begins operations
- 24 September – Monument to the fallen of the Belgian Revolution inaugurated on Place des Martyrs, Brussels.
- 3 September – Insurance scheme established for railway workers.
- 17 December – Run on the Banque de Belgique.
- 23 December – Declarations on postal reciprocity between Belgium and the Office of the Prince of Tour and Taxis signed in Frankfurt am Main.

== Publications ==
Periodicals

- Almanach royal et du commerce de Belgique (Brussels, Balleroy)
- Annuaire du clergé catholique du royaume de Belgique (Brussels, L. Schapen)
- Journal historique et littéraire, vol. 5 (Liège, P. Kersten).
- Messager des sciences et des arts de la Belgique, vol. 6 (Ghent, Léonard Hebbelynck)
- Revue de Bruxelles, 2.

Official publications

- Documents statistiques sur le Royaume de Belgique: recueillis et publiés par le Ministre de l'Intérieur (Brussels, Ch.-J. de Mat)

Guidebooks and directories

- Alexandre Ferrier de Tourettes, Guide pittoresque et artistique du voyageur en Belgique (Brussels, Société Belge de Librairie)

Fiction

- Hendrik Conscience, De Leeuw van Vlaenderen (Antwerp, L.J. de Cort).

== Art and architecture ==
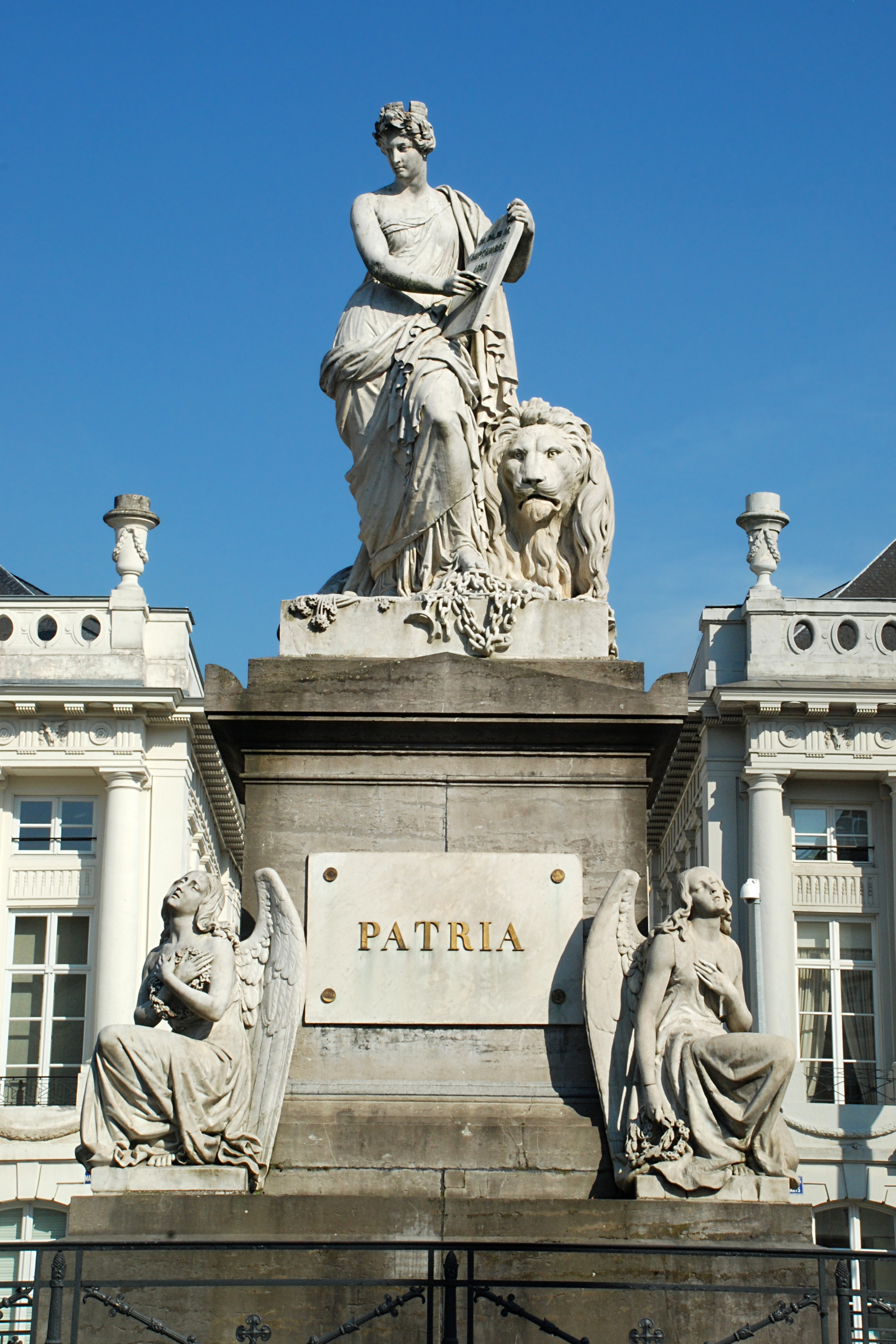
Guillaume Geefs, Pro Patria, Place des Martyrs, Brussels (1838)

Sculptures

- Guillaume Geefs, Pro Patria, Place des Martyrs, Brussels

== Births ==
- 3 January – Joseph Dupont, violinist (died 1899)
- 18 March – Jan Stobbaerts, painter (died 1914)
- 14 April – Charles Moeller, historian (died 1922)
- 16 April – Ernest Solvay, industrial chemist (died 1922)
- 23 April – Alfred Verwee, painter (died 1895)
- 9 July – Henriette Mayer van den Bergh, art collector (died 1920)
- 7 September – Louis Delacenserie, architect (died 1909)
- 23 September – Xavier de Theux de Meylandt et Montjardin, bibliophile (died 1896)
- 6 October – Henry Gabriels, bishop (died 1921)
- 15 October – August Vandekerkhove, writer and painter (died 1923)
- 30 October – Lodewijk de Koninck, writer (died 1924)

== Deaths ==
- 9 February – Françoise Blin de Bourdon (born 1756), religious leader
- 3 August – Nicolas-Jean Rouppe (born 1769), mayor of Brussels
- 7 August – Jean-François van de Velde (born 1779), bishop of Ghent
