= Léon de Herckenrode =

Belgian genealogist

Baron Jacques Salomon François Joseph Léon de Herckenrode (1818–1880) was a Belgian genealogist.

== Life ==
Herckenrode was born in Huy on 15 March 1818, the son of Auguste-Joseph de Herckenrode and Pauline-Charlotte de Berlaere. He spent most of his life in Sint-Truiden. In 1846 he became a corresponding member of the Académie d'Archéologie de Belgique, frequently publishing in the Annales de l'Académie d'Archéologie de Belgique. He died in Ghent on 22 October 1880.

== Publications ==
- Vie de la comtesse Marie d'Oyenbrugge, dite de Duras, première supérieure du couvent de Berlaymont (Brussels, 1844)
- Collection de tombes, épitaphes et blasons recueillis dans les églises et couvents de Hesbaye (Ghent, 1845)
- Notice historique sur la commune de Rummen et sur les anciens fiefs de Grasen, Wilre, Binderveld et Weyer, en Hesbaye (Ghent, 1846)
- Généalogie historique des anciens patriarches (Bruges, 1855)
- M. de Vegiano, Nobiliaire des Pays-Bas et du comté de Bourgogne, edited by J.S.F.J.L. de Herckenrode (Ghent, 1862–1868)
