= 1849 in Belgium =

- Decades: 1830s; 1840s; 1850s; 1860s
- See also: Other events of 1849; List of years in Belgium

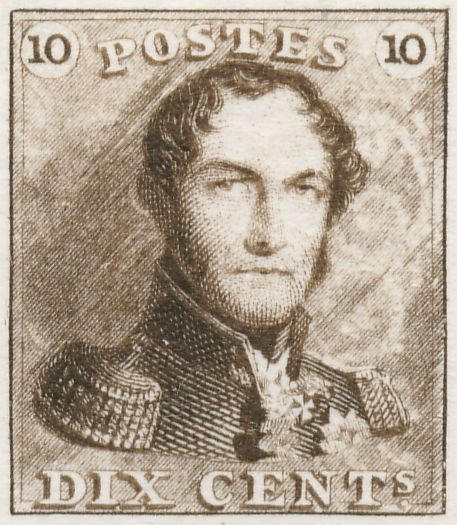
10-cent Belgian postage stamp (1849)

Events in the year 1849 in Belgium.

== Incumbents ==
Monarch: Leopold I
Head of government: Charles Rogier

== Events ==
- 24-26 March – Rio Nuñez incident off the West African coast
- 21 April – Belgian domestic law updated in line with becoming a signatory to the Treaty for the Suppression of the African Slave Trade
- 1 May – Jean-Baptiste Malou consecrated as bishop of Bruges
- 1 July – First Belgian postage stamp issued.
- 28 August – Grand Steeple-Chase des Flandres first held

== Art and architecture ==
Buildings

- Saint Joseph's Church, Brussels

Paintings

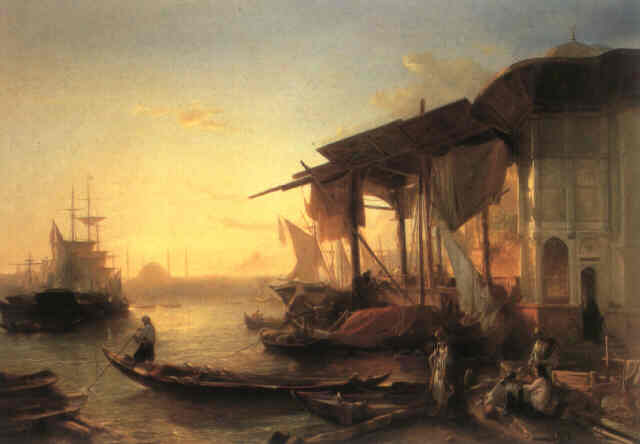
Jacob Jacobs, Merchant Vessels off the Turkish Coast (1849)

- Louis Gallait, Art and Liberty
- Jacob Jacobs, Merchant Vessels off the Turkish Coast

== Publications ==
Periodicals

- Annuaire de la noblesse de Belgique, 3.
- Bulletin de l'Académie Royale de Médecine de Belgique, 9.
- Bulletins de l'Académie Royale des Sciences, des Lettres et des Beaux-Arts de Belgique, 16 (Brussels, M. Hayez).

Books

- Félix Victor Goethals, Dictionnaire généalogique et héraldique des familles nobles du Royaume de Belgique.
- Ferdinand Augustijn Snellaert, Histoire de la littérature flamande (Brussels, Jamar)

== Births ==
- 25 March – Henri Van Dyck, painter (died 1934)
- 24 May – Albert Lancaster, meteorologist (died 1908)
- 31 May – Aymard d'Ursel, papal courtier (died 1939)
- 8 June – Julien Dillens, sculptor (died 1904)
- 10 June – Félix de Hemptinne, abbot (died 1913)
- 27 September – Emile Claus, painter (died 1924)
- 8 October – Alfred Verhaeren, painter (died 1924)
- 28 November – Albert Thys, businessman (died 1915)
- 2 December – Émile Braun, engineer (died 1927)
- 15 December – Émile Coppieters, politician (died 1922)
- 20 December – Philippe Dautzenberg, biologist (died 1935)

== Deaths ==
- 15 February – Pierre François Verhulst (born 1804), mathematician
- 7 May – Theodoor van Rijswijck (born 1811), writer
- 31 May – Leonard du Bus de Gisignies (born 1770), soldier and politician
- 27 August – Dominic Barberi (born), religious
- 16 December – Maria Jacoba Ommeganck (born 1760), painter
