= Louis Hubené =

Composer

Louis Hubené (9 November 1817 in Bruges – 23 March 1871) was a pianist, a city carillonneur of Brugges and a composer.

He was a nephew of the city carillonneur Dominique II Berger and had been raised and given a musical education by him, after being orphaned at an early age. In 1847 Hubené became a teacher of piano at the newly founded Music School of Bruges, which he remained until 1850. For more than 30 years, he was a music teacher at the English Convent, and he also gave a lot of private lessons.

As of 1832 Hubené became the assistant of his uncle, whom he succeeded as city carillonneur in 1838. He remained in this position until 1864, the year in which he was succeeded by Remi Berragan.

After having been organist at the St. Salvator's Cathedral, he was appointed as organist of the St. James's Church in 1870.

== Music ==
Hubené composed works for piano, such as:

- La Campanella
- Marche funêbre
- Marche triomphale
- Quatre sérénades
- Sourires d'un ange

He wrote several zangspelen (sung dramas):

- Bertha, of moed en heldendaed
- Boudewijn van Constantinopel
- Willem Beuckels

Hubené also composed masses and motets, which were sung in the churches of Bruges.

== Sources ==
- K. MALFEYT, Het Muziekconservatorium te Brugge, Bruges, 1922
- Noël GEIRNAERT, De beiaardiers te Brugge in het verleden, in: H. Daquin & M. Formesyn (ed.), Brugge, Belfort en Beiaard, Bruges, 1984.
- Antoon DEFOORT (dir.), Lexicon van de muziek in West-Vlaanderen, Part 2, Bruges, 2001
- Flavie ROQUET, Lexicon van Vlaamse componisten, geboren na 1800, Roularta Books, Roeselare, 2007
