= Jean Charles Joseph de Vegiano =

Jean Charles Joseph de Vegiano (1724–1794), lord of Hovel, was a genealogist and heraldist of the nobility of the Low Countries and the County of Burgundy.

== Works ==
- Nobiliaire des Pays-Bas et du comté de Bourgogne (1760)
- Supplément au Nobiliaire des Pays-Bas, et du comté de Bourgogne (1775)
- Suite du Supplément au Nobiliaire des Pays-Bas et du comté de Bourgogne (1779)
- Nobiliaire des Pays-Bas et du comté de Bourgogne, 4 volumes in 7 parts, edited by J.S.F.J.L. de Herckenrode (1862–1868)
