= 1843 Belgian general election =

← 1841	13 June 1843	1845 →
- 47 of the 95 seats in the Chamber of Representatives
Party	Seats
Catholics	32
Liberals	13
Independents	2
This lists parties that won seats. See the complete results below.
Government before	Government after election
Nothomb; Liberal-Catholic	Nothomb; Liberal-Catholic

Partial legislative elections were held in Belgium on 13 June 1843. In the Senate elections Catholics won 32 seats and Liberals 13. Voter turnout was 86%, although only 21,865 people were eligible to vote.

Under the alternating system, Chamber elections were only held in four out of the nine provinces: East Flanders, Hainaut, Liège and Limburg. As a result, 47 of the 95 Chamber seats were up for election.

== Results ==
=== Senate ===
Party	Seats
Catholics	32
Liberals	13
Independents	2
Total	47
Source: Sternberger et al.
