= Dominique II Berger =

Flemish organist and official city carillonneur of Bruges

Dominique II Berger (1 January 1780 in Bruges – 23 March 1845) was a Flemish organist and the official city carillonneur of Bruges between 1807 and 1838.

== Levensloop ==
Dominique or Dominiek II Berger was the eldest son of Dominique I Berger (1747–1797), who was an organ builder, and of Francisca van de Voorde. The Bergers were a family from Bruges that were part of a long dynasty of organ builders.

During the French Revolutionary era, Dominique II travelled to Paris where he received music lessons from Luigi Boccherini. At his return to Bruges in 1807, he was appointed as organist at the Saint-Salvatore church and succeeded Henderyck Fromont as the official carillonneur of Bruges. In December 1808, he married Maria Hubené. The marriage remained childless. The couple took care of Louis Hubené instead, an orphaned nephew who ended up succeeding Berger as the city carillonneur of Bruges in 1838.

Berger gained some renown as a composer. His oeuvre, which mostly consisted of church music, was never published and has therefore disappeared.

== Sources ==
- A. MAELFAIT, Het Muziekconservatorium te Brugge, Bruges, 1922.
- Luc LANNOO, De Brugse orgelmakers Berger en hun familie, Brussels – Bruges, 1982.
- Noël GEIRNAERT, De beiaardiers te Brugge in het verleden, in: H. Daquin & M. Formesyn (ed.), Brugge, Belfort en Beiaard, Bruges, 1984.
- Antoon DEFOORT, Lexicon van de muziek in West-Vlaanderen, Part 2, Bruges, 2001.
