= Jean-Louis van Aelbroeck =

Belgian agronomist and politician

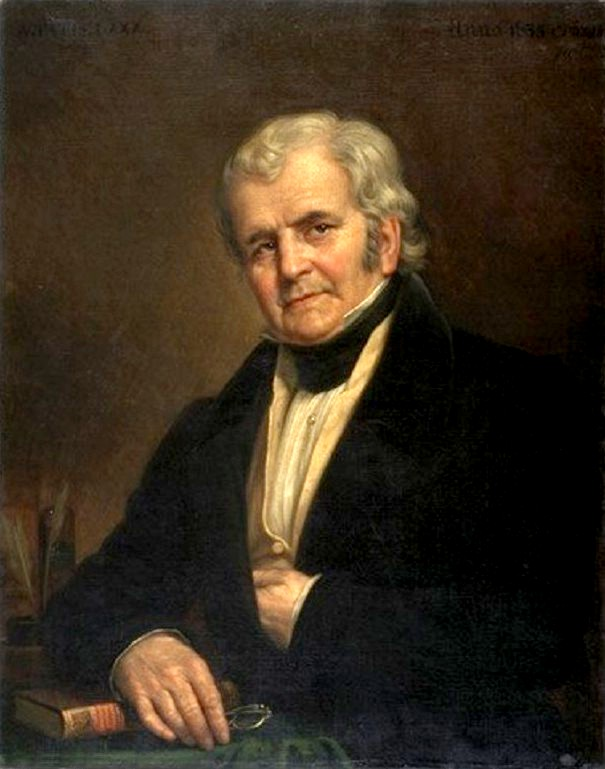
Jean-Louis van Aelbroeck (1835) by Charles Picqué

Jean-Louis van Aelbroeck (31 October 1755 Zottegem - 29 October 1846 Ghent), was a Belgian agronomist and politician. His work in Europe led to dispensing with an extended fallow period between crops.

== Works ==
- van Aelbroeck, Jean-Louis: L'Agriculture Pratique de la Flandre - Paris, Madame Huzard, 1830 8vo. LVI, 352 pp. (16 plates engraved by N.L. Rousseau) père
