= Théodore Juste =

Belgian historian (1818–1888)

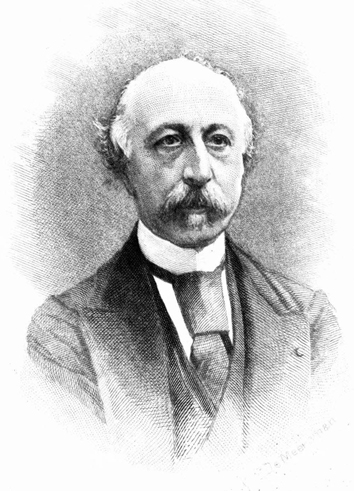
Théodore Juste

Théodore Juste (11 January 1818 in Brussels – 10 August 1888 in Saint-Gilles) was a Belgian historian and literary scholar. He became curator of the Musée royal d'antiquités, d'armures et d'artillerie in 1859.

== Works ==
- Histoire élémentaire et populaire de la Belgique, 1838.
- Précis de l'histoire moderne considérée dans ses rapports avec la Belgique, 1845.
- Histoire de la révolution Belge de 1790, 1848.
- Histoire du Congrès national de Belgique, ou de la fondation de la monarchie belge, 1850.
- Les Pays-Bas sous Philippe II, 1855.
- Christine de Lalaing, princesse d'Epinoy, 1861.
- Les Pays-Bas sous Charles-Quint: vie de Marie de Hongrie, 1861
- Souvenirs Diplomatique du XVIIIe siècle, 1863.
- La révolution Belge de 1830, d'après des documents inédits, 1872.
