= Petrus van Schendel =

Dutch painter

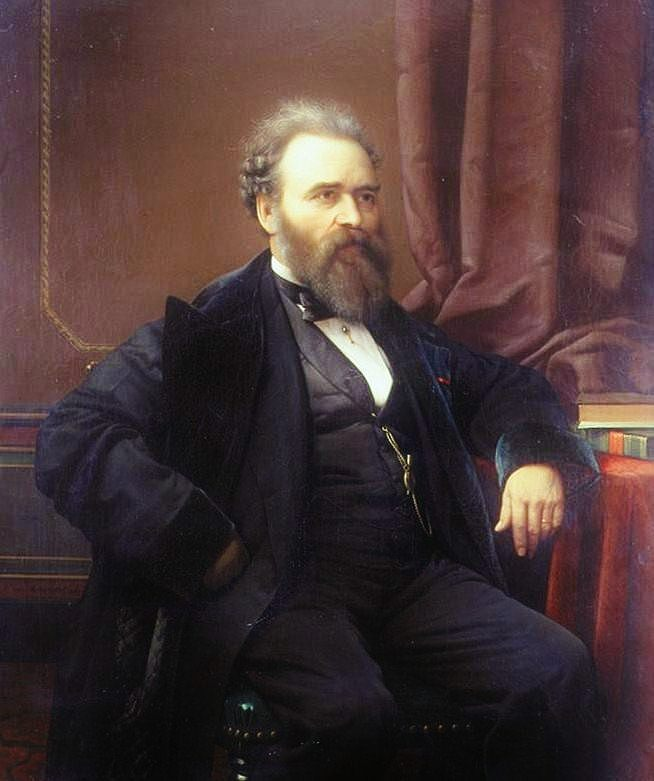
- Self-portrait (1869)
- Born: 21 April 1806; Terheijden, Netherlands
- Died: 28 December 1870 (aged 64); Brussels, Belgium
- Education: Antwerp Academy
- Movement: Romanticism

Petrus van Schendel (21 April 1806 – 28 December 1870) was a Dutch-Belgian genre painter in the Romantic style who specialized in nighttime scenes, lit by lamps or candles. This led to him being known as "Monsieur Chandelle".

== Biography ==
On the advice of a family friend, who was a retired army officer, his father sent him to study at the Royal Academy of Fine Arts in Antwerp. He studied there from 1822 to 1828 with the history painter Mattheus Ignatius van Bree, and received a gold medal for "Perspective" upon graduating.

He made a name as a portrait painter and moved frequently, living in Breda (1828–1829), Amsterdam (1830–1832), Rotterdam (1832–1838), and The Hague (1838–1845). He was a regular participant in the Exhibition of Living Masters and the various "Triennial Salons" of Antwerp, Brussels and Ghent. In 1834, he was named a member of the Royal Academy of Fine Arts in Amsterdam.

In 1845, he settled permanently in Brussels. His studio there was divided into a well-lighted space where he actually painted, and a darkened space where his models posed. He won several medals at expositions in Paris and London during the late 1840s. Some of his works were bought by King Leopold I. He also published course books on perspective and facial expression.

He painted Biblical scenes and landscapes, lit by the moon, as well as his genre works and traditional portraits. Many of his paintings were also done as ink wash drawings and made into woodcuts. In 1869, he created a few experimental paintings lit by electric arc lamps.

In addition to his art, he was interested in the mechanics of steam engines and, in 1841, patented a device for improving the blades on steamships. He also devised suggestions for improving the lateral stability of railroad cars and reclaiming the moorlands in De Kempen.

He was married three times and had fifteen children; thirteen by his first wife, Elisabeth, who died in 1850.

== Selected paintings ==
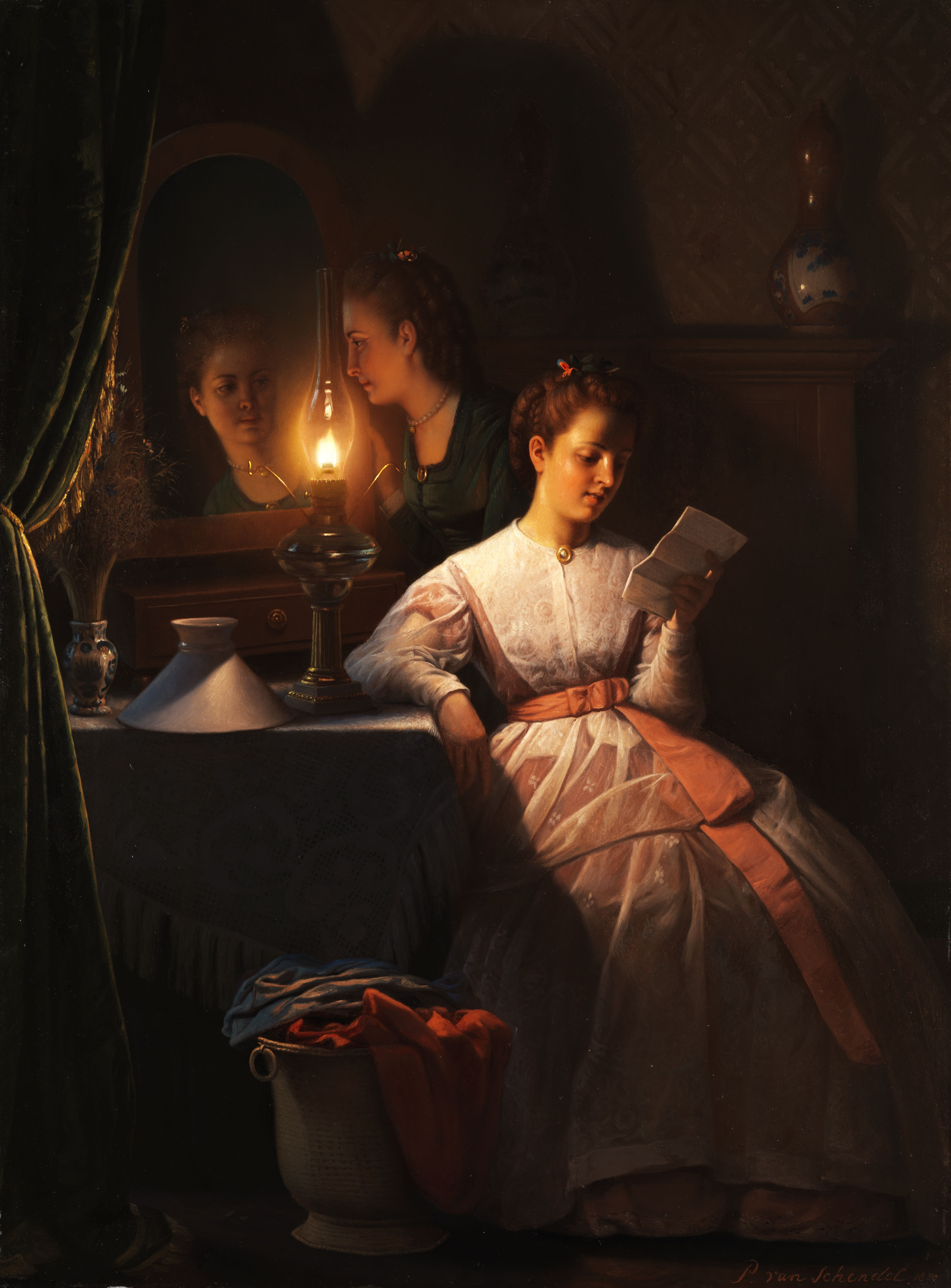
The Love Letter

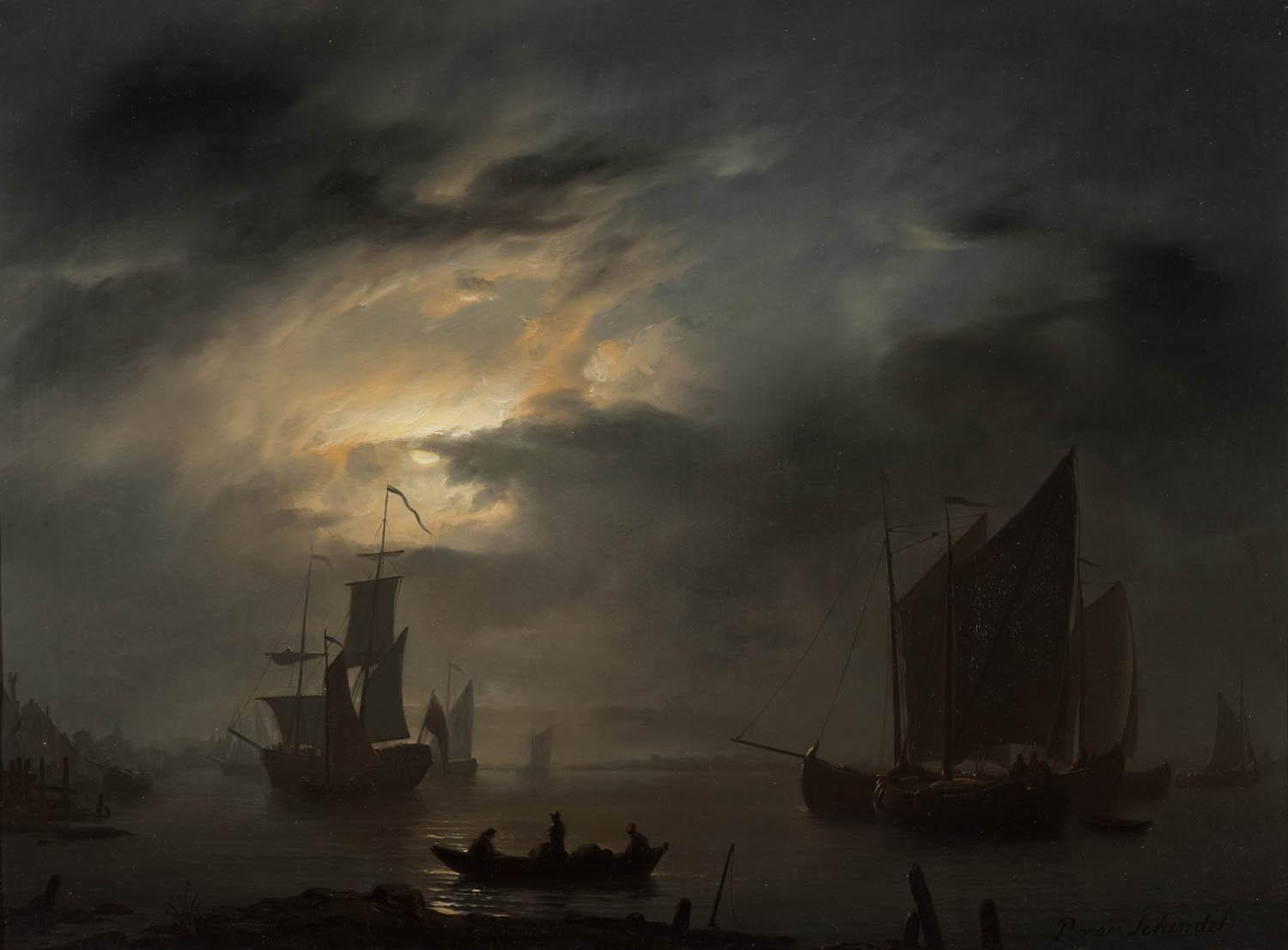
Nocturnal Marine

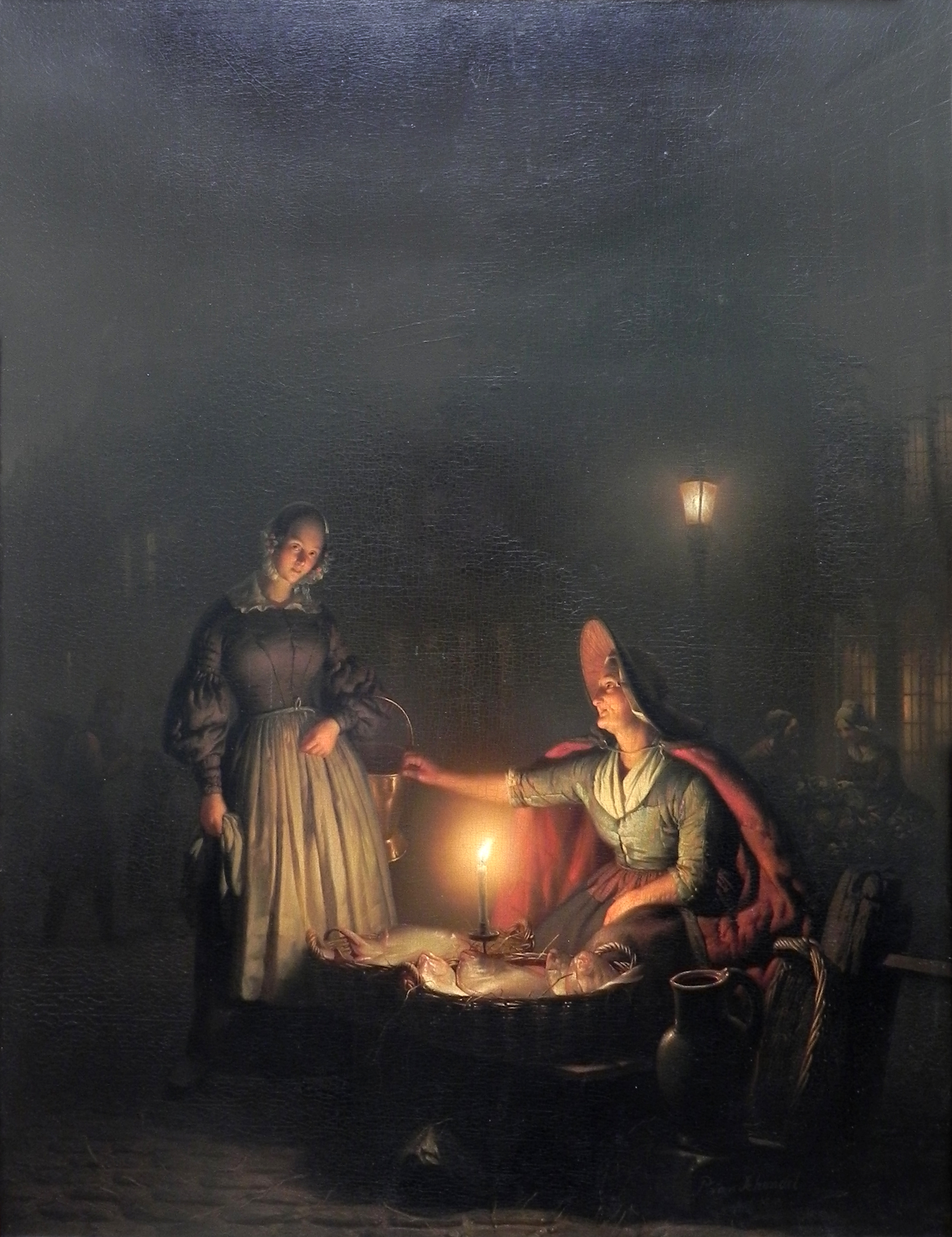
Fish Seller, Evening Market, 1843

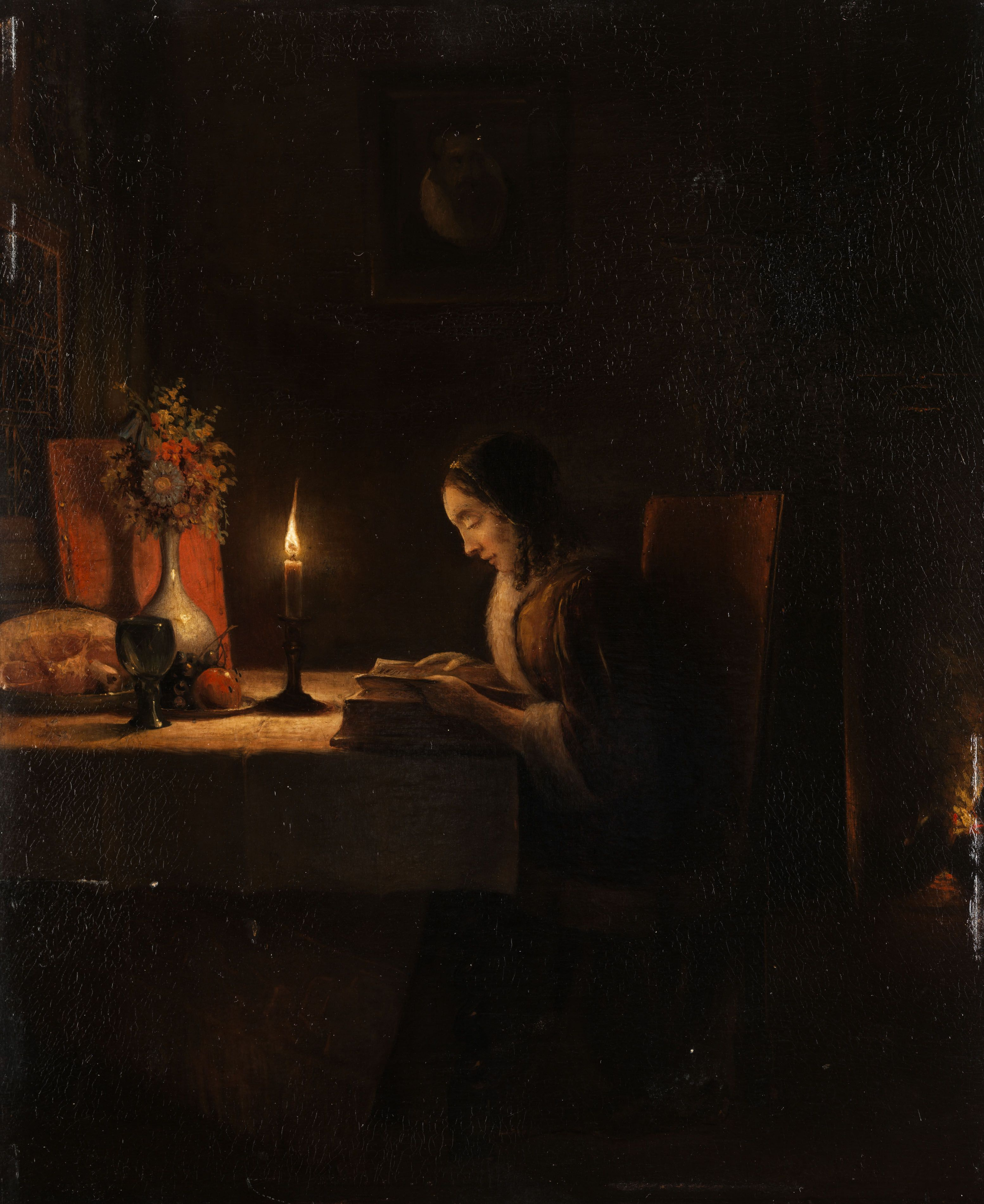
Reading by Candlelight

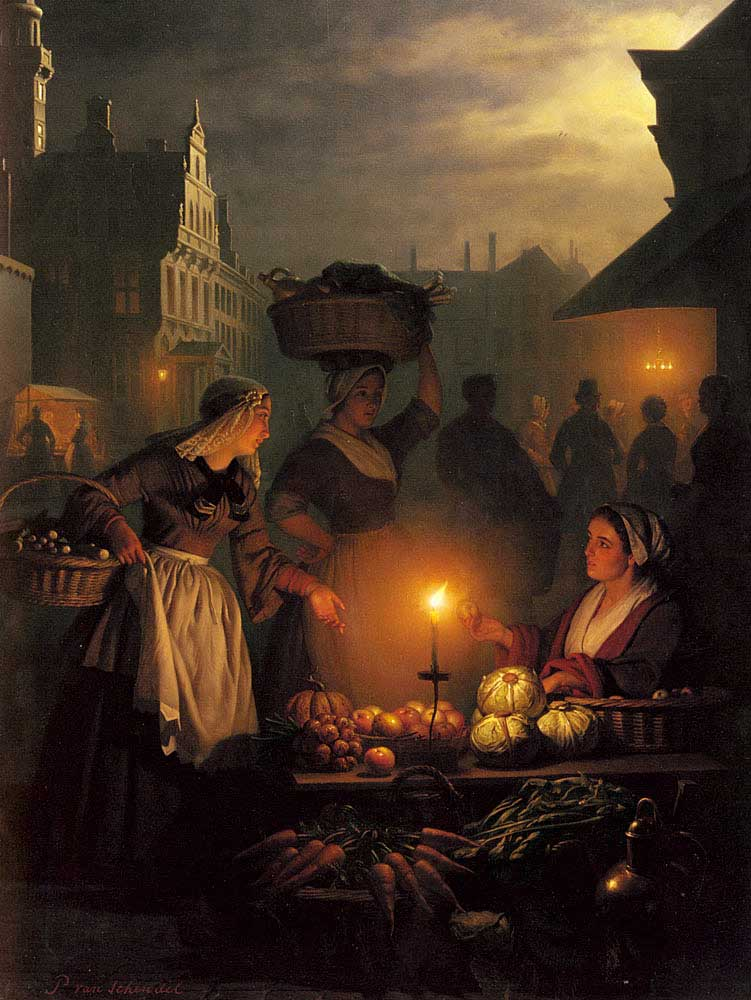
Night Market

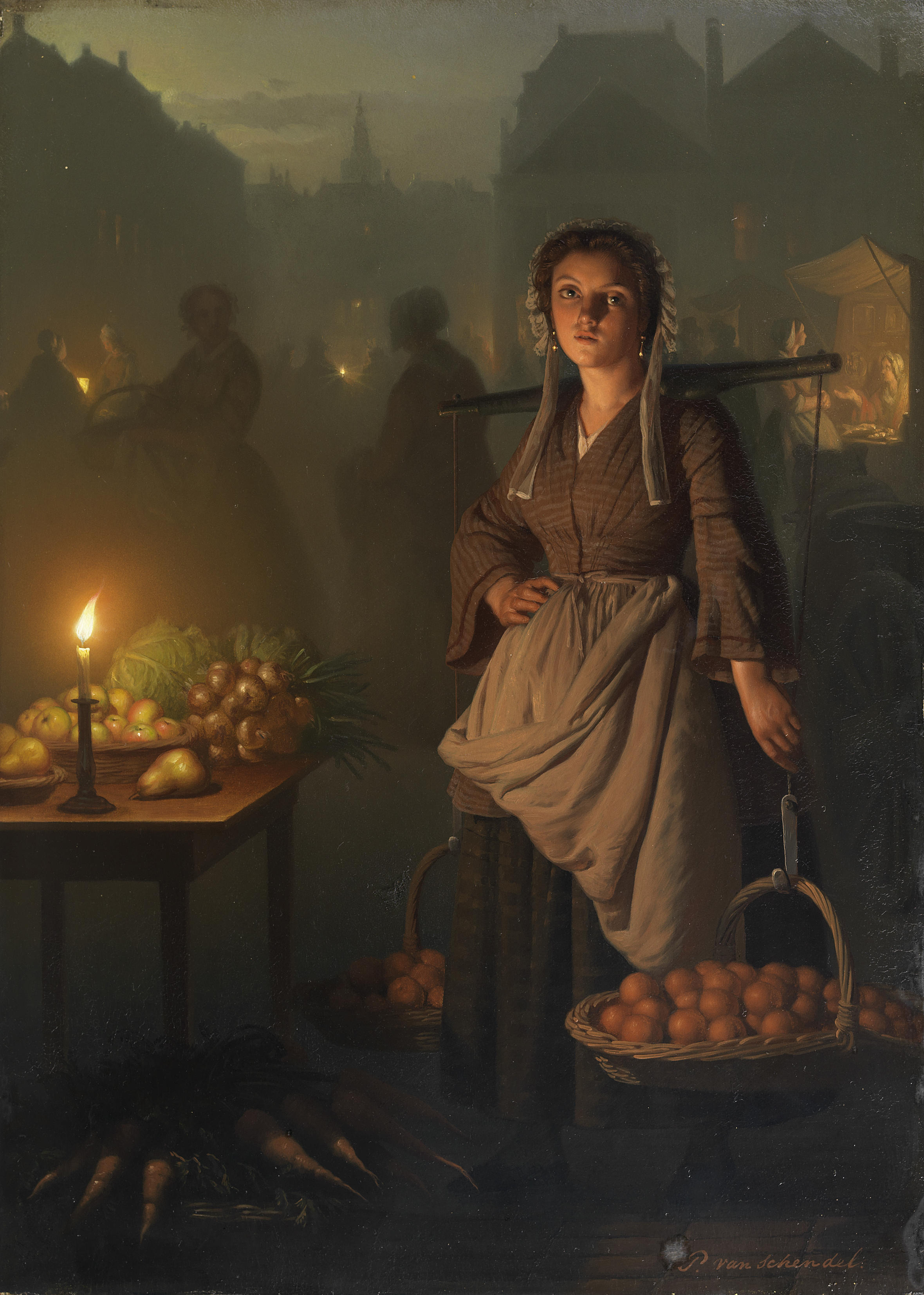
Market by candlelight, 1869

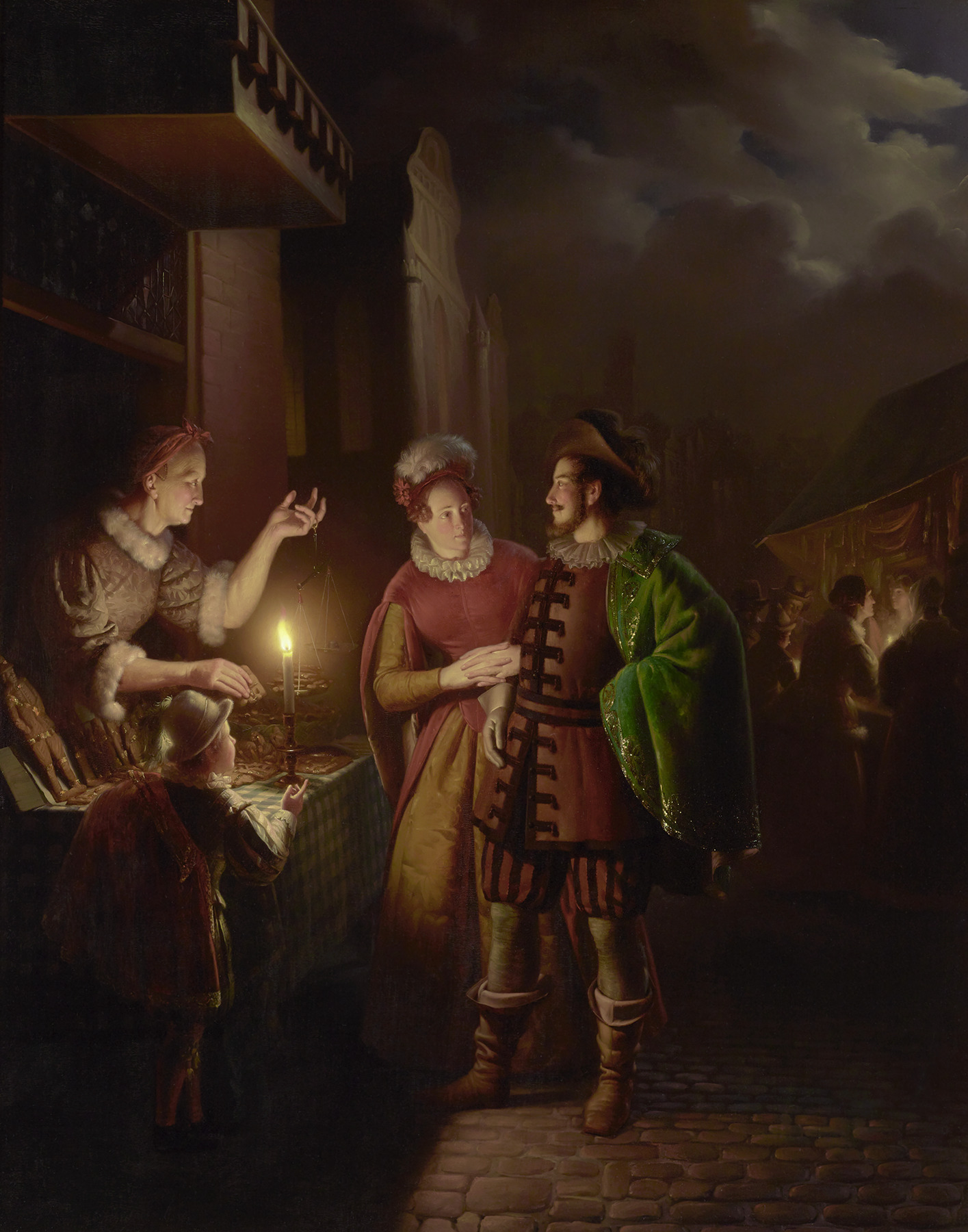
A Gingerbread Seller by Candlelight

== See also ==
- Night in paintings
