= Édouard van den Corput =

Belgian physician and medical researcher

Prof. Dr. Édouard van den Corput
- Born: 20 April 1821; Brussels, United Kingdom of the Netherlands
- Died: 22 February 1908 (aged 86); Brussels, Belgium
- Education: Université libre de Bruxelles
- Occupation: university professor
- Relatives: Henri-Joseph van den Corput (father)
- Medical career
- Field: pharmacology
- Institutions: Brussels City Hospitals; Université libre de Bruxelles

Édouard van den Corput (1821–1908) was a Belgian physician and medical researcher who was professor of clinical medicine and therapy at the Université libre de Bruxelles.

== Life ==
Van den Corput was born in Brussels on 20 April 1821. His father, Henri-Joseph van den Corput, was a pharmacist and would also become a university professor in the city. Embarking initially on university studies in classics and philosophy, he switched to pharmacology after his father's death in 1841, in order to qualify to run the family business. He graduated as a pharmacist in 1845, taught some courses on pharmacology in Brussels, and attended Bonn University for further studies in chemistry. He worked as a pharmacist in Brussels while studying for the degree of doctor of science, and then doctor of medicine. He was a founding member of the Société de pharmacie.

From 1860 to 1874 he worked as a physician and a teacher in the city hospitals in Brussels. In 1871 he became a professor at the university, teaching clinical medicine and general medical therapy, including pharmacodynamics.

He published widely on chemistry, pharmacy, technology, therapies, medical ethics, and the history of medicine, in a variety of journals. By 1857 he was on the editorial board of the Journal de médecine, de chirurgie et de pharmacologie de Bruxelles, serving until 1887.

From 1894 to 1900 he sat in the Belgian Parliament as senator for Brussels. He was also an amateur artist and an avid art collector. He died in Brussels on 22 February 1908.

== Writings ==
- Des eaux minérales naturelles et de leur analyse (1847)
- Du poison qui se développe dans les viandes et dans les boudins fumés (1855)
- L'épidémie de fièvre récurrente observée à Saint-Petersbourg en 1864 (1865)
- Origine et cause de l'épidémie de fièvre typhoïde qui a régné à Bruxelles pendant les premiers mois de 1869 (1869)
- La crémation (1885)
- Les lazarets volants et les lazarets fixes (1885)
- L'alcoolisme, l'hérédité et la question sociale (1895)
- Bruxellensia: Croquis artistiques et historiques (1896)
- Utilité des embellissements de Bruxelles: Nécessité de l'agrandissement territorial de la capital de la Belgique (1899)
