= Victor Chauvin =

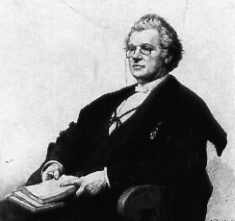
Victor Chauvin

Victor Chauvin (1844–1913), an Arabic and Hebrew professor at the University of Liège, wrote a number of notable books on Middle Eastern literature and folklore, orientalism, biblical history, and Sharia, including L`histoire de l`Islamisme and Bibliographie des Ouvrages Arabes Ou Relatifs Aux Arabes Publies Dans L'Europe Chretienne De 1810 à 1885.
