= Angélique de Rouillé =

Belgian writer

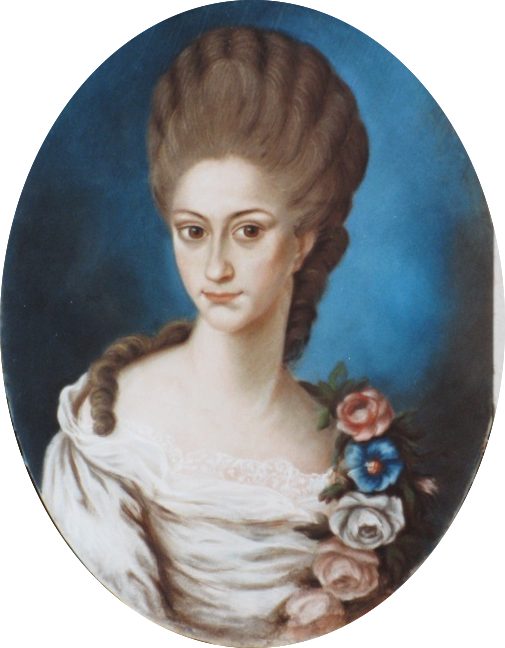
Angélique de Rouillé

Angélique de Rouillé (25 June 1756 – 4 February 1840) was a Belgian writer, remembered for her literary correspondence.
