= Adolphe Deschamps =

Belgian politician (1807–1875)

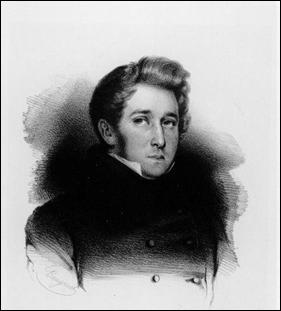
- Adolphe Deschamps
- Born: 17 June 1807; Melle, First French Empire
- Died: 19 July 1875 (aged 68); Manage, Belgium
- Other names: Adolphe Dechamps
- Occupations: Politician, statesman, publisher

Adolphe Deschamps (French: [adɔlf deʃɑ̃]; also Dechamps [dəʃɑ̃]; 17 June 1807 – 19 July 1875) was a Belgian statesman and publisher, the brother of Cardinal Victor-Auguste-Isidor Deschamps.

He entered public life about 1830 and soon became popular through his contributions to several Catholic newspapers. Having founded, with his friend Pierre de Decker, the Revue de Bruxelles, he advocated in that paper a system of parliamentary government which was termed "government of the centres". The ministries were to be composed of Catholics and Liberals and to be supported by the moderate elements of the two parties. The scheme worked for some years. In 1834 Dechamps was elected to the Belgian Chamber of Representatives, where his talent as an orator soon secured him a prominent position. In 1836 he participated very actively in the discussion of the bill on the organization of the communes, and in 1839 he opposed the Treaty of London, 1839. The great powers had imposed that treaty on Belgium and the Netherlands in 1834, but the latter had delayed accepting it in the hope that she might eventually obtain better conditions. Deschamps, with many others, held that by this delay the Netherlands had forfeited her right to the advantages granted her by the Powers and they urged the Government to appeal to arms rather than to surrender any part of Belgian territory. This warlike policy, however, would have been opposed by the Great Powers, and peace was finally signed with the Netherlands.

He also played a leading part in the passing of the bill on elementary education. Up to 1842 there had been no elementary public schools in Belgium, although there were numerous schools organized under the direction of the clergy. One of the provisions of the new bill enacted that religious instruction was to form an essential part of public education and to be under the control of the clergy. The bill was passed almost unanimously by the votes of both Catholics and Liberals. From 1843 to 1848 Dechamps was a member of several ministries. After the defeat of his party in 1848 he became the leader of the Catholic minority in the Chamber of Representatives and retained that position for several years. In 1864 he retired from politics and engaged in financial enterprises, but his ventures proved unsuccessful.

== Honours ==
- Grand officer of the Order of Leopold.
- Knight Grand Cross in the Legion of Honour
- Knight 1st class in the Order of the Red Eagle
- Knight Grand Cross in the Order of Saint Michael
- Kingdom of Italy: Knight Grand Cross in the Order of Saints Maurice and Lazarus
- Knight Grand Cross in the Order of the Netherlands Lion
- Knight Grand Cross in the Order of the Gold Lion of the House of Nassau

== Published works ==
- Le second Empire (Brussels, 1859);
- Le second Empire et l'Angleterre (Brussels, 1865);
- Jules César; l'empire jugé par l'empereur (Brussels, 1865);
- La France et l'Allemagne (Brussels, 1865);
- La Convention de Gastein (Brussels, 1865);
- Les partis en Belgique et le nouveau règne (Brussels, 1866);
- L'école dans ses rapports avec l'Eglise, l'Etat et la liberté (Brussels, 1869);
- Le prince de Bismarck et l'entrevue des trois empereurs (Brussels, 1873).
