= Jeanne-Marie Artois =

Belgian brewer

Jeanne-Marie Artois (1762–1840) was a Belgian brewer.

She was the daughter of the brewer Adrian Artois (d. 1783) and Marie Jeanne Artois (d. 1785), and the sister of Leopold Artois (d. 1813) and Marie-Barbe Artois (d. 1821). Her father was the owner of the major fr:Brasserie Artois Artois Brewery in Leuven (Louvain), which belonged to the biggest in the Austrian Netherlands.

After the death of her father, the brewery passed to her mother, and after her mother's death in 1785, it passed to all six siblings, who managed it mutually under the leadership of their brother Leopold Artois, who was the director of the company. She was not a passive partner, but was actively involved in the business and assisted her brother in the rapid expansion of the company which took place under his management. In 1794 the Austrian Netherlands was taken by France, and the Artois Brewery was one of the biggest breweries in France during the Napoleonic era.

When her brother died in 1813, she and her sister Marie-Barbe Artois took over the company as joint directors. In 1814, she married mayor Jean-Baptiste Plasschaert at the age of 52 in a marriage described as a business project to support the company. In 1821, Jeanne-Marie Artois took over the company as sole director after the death of her sister. None of her five siblings had any children, and she made the nephew of her lawyer, Albert Marnef, her heir. Jeanne-Marie Artois is regarded as an important figure in the history of brewery in Belgium, as well as in the history of businesswomen.
