= Henry Robert Addison =

- Born: 1805; Calcutta
- Died: 24 June 1876 (aged 70–71)
- Military career
- Rank: lieutenant
- Unit: 2nd Dragoon Guards

Henry Robert Addison (1805–1876), sometimes erroneously called Captain Addison, was born in Calcutta. He became a cornet in the 2nd Dragoon Guards on 12 July 1827, and was promoted to lieutenant on 15 March 1831, which rank he held until 21 June 1833, when he was placed on half pay. He began writing for the stage in 1830 and was the author of about sixty dramas and farces. He was lessee of Queen's Theatre, London from August 1836 to 1837. He wrote many songs and articles in monthly magazines. He was author of about twelve novels and stories. He edited Who's Who from 1849 to 1850. He was special correspondent of a morning paper at the Paris exhibition in 1867. He was deputy chairman of London steamboat company. He died at Albion St., Hyde Park, London, on 24 June 1876, aged 71.

== Bibliography ==
- "Our Portrait Gallery, No. XXIII: Henry R. Addison, Esquire" (1841) 18 Dublin University Magazine 505. Portrait on p 504.
- Daryll Grantley. "Addison, Henry Robert" in Historical Dictionary of British Theatre: Early Period. Scarecrow Press. 2013. Page 26.
- Carty, T J. "Addison, Henry Robert" in Dictionary of Literary Pseudonyms in the English Language. Routledge. 2015. Page 247.
- "Addison H. R." The Era Almanack, 1868. Second Edition. Conducted by Edward Ledger. Catherine Street, Strand, London. 1868. Page 17.
- Elisabeth Jay. British Writers and Paris: 1830–1875. Oxford University Press. 2016. Pages 86, 90 and 91.
- Houghton and Slingerland. "Addison, Henry Robert" in The Wellesley Index to Victorian Periodicals, 1824-1900. University of Toronto Press. 1989. Volume 5. Page 7.
- Sudduth, Carr and Roy. "Tam o' Shanter: A Comic Drama in Two Acts" in The G. Ross Roy Collection of Robert Burns: An Illustrated Catalogue. The University of South Carolina Press. Page 145.
