= Treaty for the Suppression of the African Slave Trade =

1841 multilateral treaty

The Treaty for the Suppression of the African Slave Trade was the first multilateral treaty for the suppression of the slave trade, signed in London on 20 December 1841 by the representatives of the Austrian Empire, the Kingdom of France, the United Kingdom of Great Britain and Ireland, the Kingdom of Prussia and the Russian Empire. Austria, Great Britain, Prussia and Russia subsequently ratified the treaty, but Louis Philippe I, king of France, declined to do so. The signatories undertook to suppress the African slave trade, in Article 2 each authorising the navies of the other signatories to search merchant ships sailing under their flag in the Atlantic and the Indian Ocean if there was reasonable grounds to suspect them of engaging in the trade:

In order more completely to accomplish the object of the present Treaty, the High Contracting Parties agree by common consent, that those of their ships of war which shall be provided with special Warrants and Orders, prepared according to the forms of the Annex A of the present Treaty, may search every merchant vessel belonging to any one of the High Contracting Parties which shall, on reasonable grounds, be suspected of being engaged in the Traffic in Slaves, or of having been fitted out for that purpose ...

This allowed mutual enforcement of the previously unenforced condemnation of the slave trade in the "Declaration of the Eight Courts Relative to the Universal Abolition of the Slave Trade" (8 February 1815) which had become Annex XV of the final act of the Congress of Vienna.

Lewis Cass, the American ambassador to France, had protested to the French Foreign Minister, François Guizot, that the treaty would curtail national sovereignty by instituting an international right of search. Rather than concede such a right, the United States in the 1842 Webster–Ashburton Treaty agreed to joint searches by British and American squadrons.

The Kingdom of Belgium acceded to the treaty in 1848.

== See also ==
- Abolitionism in the United Kingdom
