= Karel Lodewijk Ledeganck =

Flemish writer

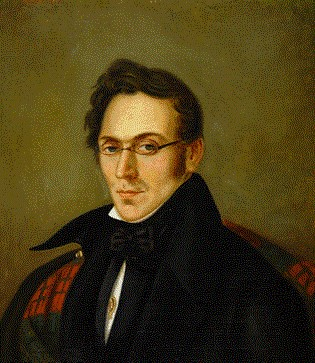
Karel Lodewijck Ledeganck

Karel Lodewijk Ledeganck (Eeklo, 9 November 1805 – Ghent, 19 March 1847) was a Flemish writer. He was of humble origin, but became extraordinary Professor at the University of Ghent. He started his career as a clerk, then became a judge, and school inspector before he came to teach at the university.

In 1836, he published the poem Het klavier ("the keyboard"), but he made his actual debut in 1838, with the poems in Bloemen mijner lente ("flowers of my spring"). His initial work was strongly influenced by the English and French Romantic movement, and more specifically by Byron and Lamartine, in contrast to his later poems, which were rather pessimistic. With his Drie zustersteden of 1843, dedicated to the cities of Ghent, Bruges and Antwerp, which was called the poetic gospel of the Flemish movement, he achieved a breakthrough. In this trilogy he showed himself to be the best Flemish poet of his generation. In his, now somewhat exalted or melancholic, style he proclaimed his love for the Flemish people and his belief in their future.

The Karel Lodewijk Ledeganckstraat in Ghent was named after him. The Ledeganck Campus of sciences of Ghent University is located here.

== See also ==
- Flemish literature
