= Henri-Joseph van den Corput =

Belgian pharmacist

- Born: 1790; Antwerp, Austrian Netherlands
- Died: 28 April 1841 (aged 50–51); Brussels, Kingdom of Belgium
- Occupation: pharmacist
- Relatives: Édouard van den Corput (son)
- Medical career
- Profession: Professor of pharmacology and toxicology
- Institutions: Université libre de Bruxelles

Henri-Joseph van den Corput (1790–1841) was a Belgian pharmacist who became professor of pharmacology and toxicology at the Université libre de Bruxelles.

== Life ==
Van den Corput was born in Antwerp in 1790, to a family originally from Holland. He studied chemistry in Paris and graduated as a pharmacist there. He set up a pharmacy in Brussels, and after the Belgian Revolution of 1830 was appointed chief pharmacist to the newly formed Belgian army. He served on a number of government and civic commissions on medical qualifications and medical practice, including the revision of the Belgian pharmacopoeia, and was particularly active during the 1826–1837 cholera pandemic, which reached Brussels in 1832.

He taught pharmacy and toxicology at the Free University of Brussels from 1834 until his death. He collected a large variety of natural history specimens and exotic plants, in 1827 being the first in Belgium to grow vanilla fruit. He died in Brussels on 28 April 1841.
