= Jules de Saint-Genois =

Belgian liberal politician, historian, librarian and professor

Jules, Baron de Saint-Genois
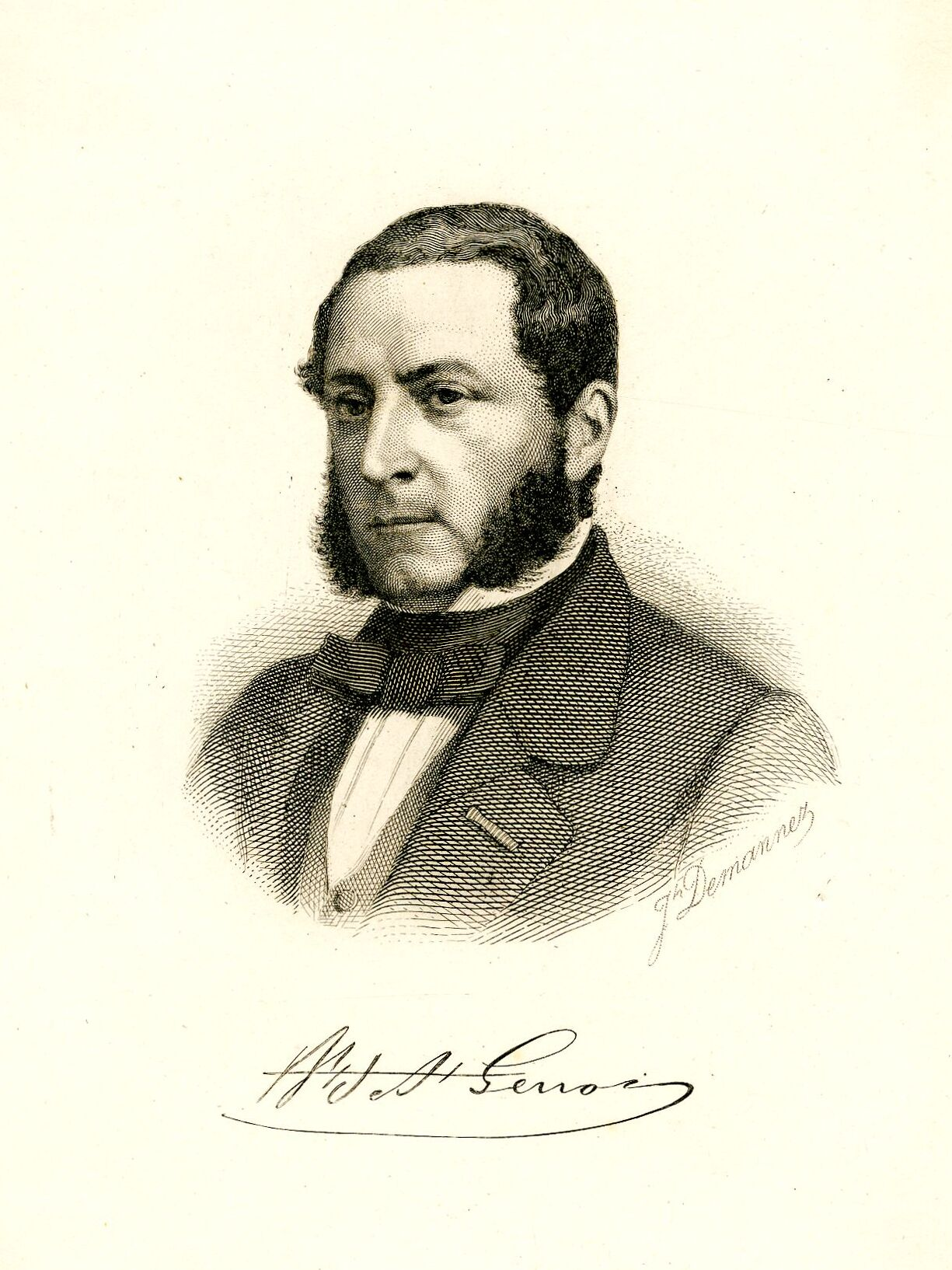
- Born: 22 March 1813; Sint-Kwintens-Lennik, Belgium
- Died: 10 September 1867 (aged 54); Ghent, Belgium
- Occupations: politician, historian, librarian, professor

Jules, Baron de Saint-Genois (22 March 1813 – 10 September 1867) was a Belgian liberal politician, historian, librarian and professor at the University of Ghent. He was the first President of the Willemsfonds and a prolific contributor to the early volumes of the Biographie Nationale de Belgique, serving as president of the editorial committee.

== Bibliography ==
De Saint-Genois wrote various historical novels and stories, in both French and Dutch. His historical research was published in monographs and articles in historical journals. As the provincial archivist of East Flanders he published an inventory of the charters of the counts of Flanders. The manuscripts kept at the university library of Ghent were described by him in a published catalogue.

=== Novels and collections of short stories ===
- 1835: Hembyse; histoire gantoise de la fin du XVI^{e} siècle
- 1837: La cour du duc Jean IV, chronique brabançonne, 1418–1421
- 1840: Le Faux Baudouin (Flandre et Hainaut, 1225) (translated into Dutch as Bertrand van Bains, 1843)
- 1844: Anna; historisch tafereel uit de vlaemsche geschiedenis tydens Maria van Bourgonje (1477)
- 1846: Le château de Wildenborg, ou les mutinés du siége d'Ostende (1604) (2 vols., Brussels, A. van Dale).
  - translated into Dutch as Het kasteel van Wildenborg, of de Spaansche muitelingen bij het beleg van Oostende (1604), 1846, and as Het kasteel van Wildenburg of De muitelingen der belegering van Oostende (1604), 1855.
- 1851: De grootboekhouder, Eene Gentsche vertelling
- 1852: Feuillets détachés (translated into Dutch as Losse bladen, 1854)
- 1854: Historische verhalen
- 1860: Profils et portraits
- 1866: Les Flamands d'autrefois

=== Other publications ===
- 1837: Histoire des avoueries en Belgique
- 1843–1846: Inventaire analytique des chartes des comtes de Flandre, avant l’avènement des princes de la maison de Bourgogne, autrefois déposées au Chateau de Rupelmonde, et conservées aujourd’hui aux Archives de la Flandre-Orientale; précédé d’une notice historique sur l’ancienne trésorerie des chartes de Rupelmonde, et suivi d’un glossaire, de notes et d’éclaircissements
- 1847: Les voyageurs belges du XIII^{e} au XVIII^{e} siècle
- 1848: Sur des lettres inédites de Jacques de Vitry, évêque de Saint-Jean-d'Acre, cardinal et légat du Pape, écrites en 1216
- 1849–1852: Catalogue méthodique et raisonné des manuscrits de la bibliothèque de la ville et de l'université de Gand
- 1851: Voyages faits en Terre-Sainte par Thetmar en 1217, et par Burchard de Strasbourg en 1175, 1189 ou 1225
- 1856: Missions diplomatiques de Corneille Duplicius de Schepper, dit Scepperus (with Gerhard Antony IJssel de Schepper)
- 1861: Antoine Sanderus et ses écrits. Une page de notre histoire littéraire au XVII^{e} siècle

== Sources ==
- Jules de Saint-Genois; Pajottenland (Internet Archive)
- Jules de Saint-Genois; Biografisch Woordenboek der Noord- en Zuidnederlandse letterkunde (1888–1891)
