= Royal Academy of Archaeology of Belgium =

The Royal Academy of Archaeology of Belgium (French: Académie Royale d'Archéologie de Belgique, Dutch: Koninklijke Academie voor Oudheidkunde van België), founded in 1842, is a learned society in Belgium that works to promote research and education in the fields of archaeology and art history. In a federal country with most powers devolved to the regions and communities, it is one of the few cultural institutions operating at a federal level. Long established in the Royal Museums of Art and History, since 2009 it has met in the Academy Palace.

== Publications ==
The academy publishes or has published:

- Annales de l'Académie royale d'Archéologie de Belgique (1843–1930)
- Bulletin de l'Académie royale d'Archéologie de Belgique (1868–1930)
- Revue belge d'Archéologie et d'Histoire de l'Art / Belgisch Tijdschrift voor Oudheidkunde en Kunstgeschiedenis (1931–)

== Presidents ==
The first president of the academy was Joseph de Kerckhove.
