= Messager des sciences historiques =

- Discipline: History, Art history, Bibliography, Archaeology, Numismatics, Heraldry, Sigillography
- Language: French

Publication details
- History: 1839–1896
- Publisher: Léonard Hebbelynck (1839–1874); Eugeen Vanderhaeghen (1875–1896)

Standard abbreviations
- ISO 4: Messag. Sci. Hist.

Messager des sciences historiques, published in Ghent from 1839 to 1896, was the most important Belgian history journal of the 19th century. Most of the contents related to the history of the medieval Low Countries. The initial editorial team was made up of Jules de Saint-Genois, Constant-Philippe Serrure, Philip Blommaert, Auguste Voisin and Auguste Van Lokeren, with some involvement from Frédéric de Reiffenberg and Antoine Schayes.
