= Jean-Baptiste Nothomb =

Belgian politician (1805–1881)

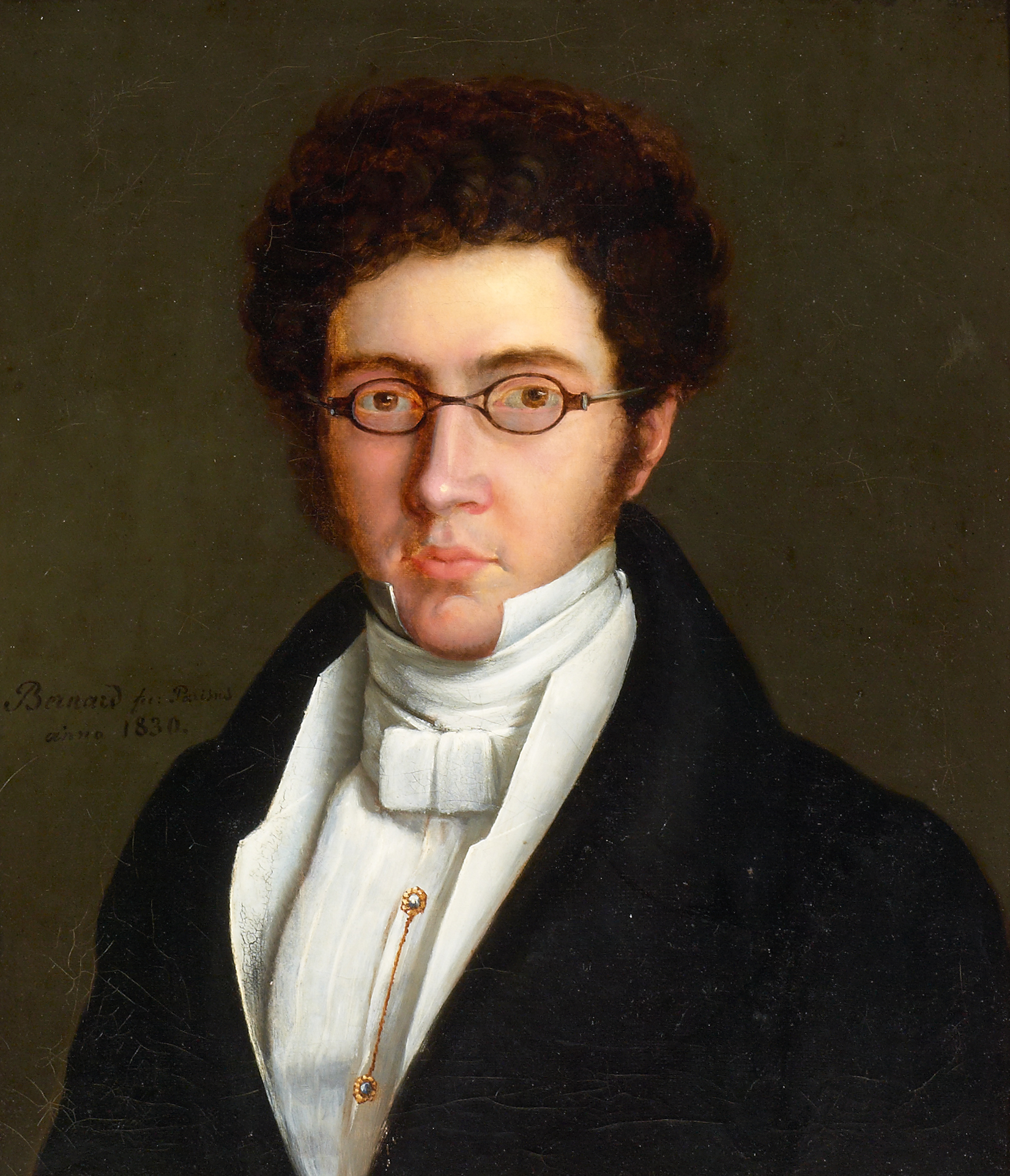

Prime Minister of Belgium
- In office 13 April 1841 – 30 July 1845
- Monarch: Leopold I
- Preceded by: Joseph Lebeau
- Succeeded by: Sylvain Van de Weyer

Personal details
- Born: 3 July 1805 Messancy, France (now Belgium)
- Died: 16 September 1881 (aged 76) Berlin, Germany
- Party: Liberal Party
- Education: University of Liège

Jean-Baptiste, Baron Nothomb (French pronunciation: [ʒɑ̃ batist baʁɔ̃ nɔtɔ̃]; 3 July 1805 – 16 September 1881) was a Belgian statesman and diplomat, who served as the prime minister of Belgium from 1841 to 1845.

== Life ==
=== Revolution ===
Born at Messancy in Luxembourg on 3 July 1805, he was educated at the Athénée de Luxembourg and the University of Liège, and was in Luxemburg when the Revolution of August broke out, but was nominated a member of the commission appointed to draw up the Constitution.

Nothomb became a member of the national congress, and became secretary-general of the ministry of foreign affairs under Érasme-Louis Surlet de Chokier. He supported the candidature of the Orléanist Louis, Duke of Nemours, and joined in the proposal to offer the crown to Prince Leopold of Saxe-Coburg, being one of the delegates sent to London.

When the Eighteen Articles of the Treaty of London were replaced by the Twenty-four less favorable to Belgium, he insisted on the need for compliance, and in 1839 he faced violent opposition to support the territorial cessions in Limburg and Luxemburg, which had remained an open question so long as the Netherlands refused to acknowledge the Twenty-four Articles.

=== Later life ===
His Essai historique et politique sur la révolution belge (1838) won for him the praise of Palmerston and the cross of the Legion of Honor from French king Louis Philippe. In 1837 he became minister of public works. The rapid development of the Belgian railway system, and the increase in the mining industry, were largely due to him.

In 1840 he was sent as Belgian envoy to the German Confederation, and in 1841, on the fall of the Lebeau ministry, he organized the new cabinet, reserving for himself the portfolio of minister of the interior. In 1845 he was defeated, and retired from the Belgian Parliament, but he held a number of diplomatic appointments before his death in Berlin.

== Honours ==
- Anhalt : Knight Grand Cross in the Order of Albert the Bear.
- Kingdom of Belgium : Grand Cordon in the Order of Leopold.
- Kingdom of Prussia : Knight 1st Class; Order of the Red Eagle.
- Kingdom of France : Knight Grand Cross in the Legion of Honour.
- Knight Grand Cross in the Order of the Netherlands Lion.
- Knight Grand Cross in the Order of the Zähringer Lion.
- Knight Grand Cross in the Order of Charles III.
- Knight Grand Cross in the Order of Saint Michael.
- Knight Grand Cross in the Order of Philip the Magnanimous.
- Kingdom of Portugal :
  - Knight Grand Cross in the Order of Christ.
  - Officer in the Order of the Tower and Sword.
- Saxe-Coburg and Gotha: Knight Grand Cross in the Saxe-Ernestine House Order.
- Officer in the Order of the Southern Cross .

Political offices
| Preceded by Joseph Lebeau | Prime Minister of Belgium; 1841–1845 | Succeeded by Sylvain Van de Weyer |
