= Revue de Bruxelles =

Revue de Bruxelles was a review published in Brussels from 1837 to 1850. The founding editors were Adolphe Deschamps and Pierre de Decker, whose intention was to produce a mix of original articles by Belgian writers together with summaries or translations of articles from reviews published in other countries. While the review was initially monthly, from 1842 it appeared only twice per year. Both founding editors resigned at the end of 1842, and a new editorial team took over, changing the title to Nouvelle Revue de Bruxelles in 1843. In 1846 the original title was restored, with the subtitle "Nouvelle série".

== Notable contributors ==
- Joseph Jean De Smet
