= Édouard de Walckiers =

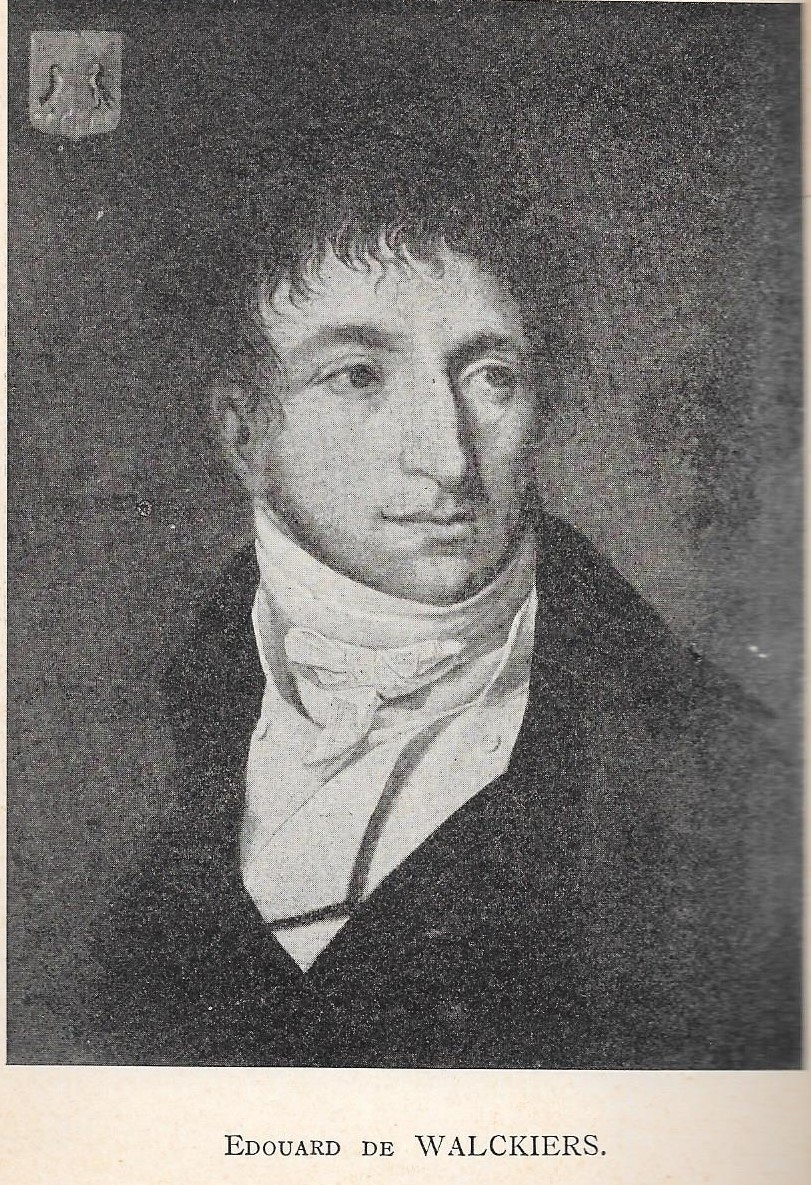
Banker and Vonckist Edouard de Walckiers

Viscount Joseph Édouard Sébastien de Walckiers de Tronchiennes (7 November 1758 - 17 April 1837) was a Brussels-born banker.

== Life ==
He was the son of viscount Adrien Ange de Walckiers de Tronchiennes and of Dieudonnée Louise Josephine de Nettine, heir to the Nettine bank in Brussels, founded in 1733 by her father Matthias de Nettine. Matthias' widow Barbe Stoupy inherited the bank in 1749: {{cquote|Madame de Netitine had no trouble succeeding her husband. On 19 July 1749, an act signed by the marquis de Herzelles and counsellor Papejans de Morchoven confirmed her in her position as a "suitable and capable person" to occupy it after the decease of the titular deceased:

Stahremberg, convinced of the stability of the bank, advised, in the common interest, to leave things as they were. By right, Madame de Walckiers succeeded her mother as banker to the Court since she was the eldest

The Nettine bank was the most important in the Austrian Netherlands:

Only the house founded by Matthias de Nettine had sufficient scope for delivering public operations. It soon had to become the state's official agent ; a bodyguard was watching over its security

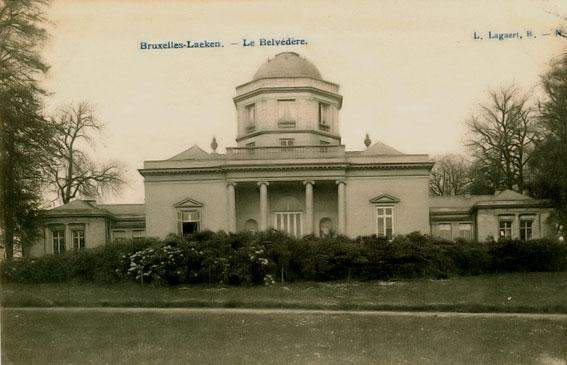
Belvédère Castle in Laeken

Édouard de Walckiers' first marriage was in 1783 to Barbe de Reul (1767-1791), with whom he had one child, Louise Jeanne (1784-1825), who in 1801 married Count Alexandre Batowski (1758-1824). In 1799 he married his second wife, Rose-Françoise Renaut (1773-1837), with whom he had Charles-Louis, 3rd Viscount de Walckiers (1793-1849) and Alphonse 4th Viscount de Walckiers (1814-1879), who had issue.

On 16 January 1784 Joseph Édouard de Walckiers was made counsellor-receiver-general of finances for the Austrian Netherlands In 1788 he built Belvédère Castle to designs by Antoine Payen the Elder - in the 20th century this became Prince Albert's residence. During the Brabant Revolution he became a member of the secret society Pro aris et focis. He also financed the Vonckists and in March 1790 fled to France, where he stayed for a time at the château de Hem near Lille Around 1791 he purchased the Orléans Collection from Philippe-Égalité for 750,000 francs before reselling it to François Laborde de Méréville in 1792 for 950,000 francs. In March 1794 he was denounced as an Austrian agent and as a speculator on the exchange. He fled to Hamburg but was removed from the list of émigrés on 29 May 1800 and returned to France under the French Directory, dying in Paris in 1837, more or less ruined.

== Bibliography (in French) ==
- Suzanne Tassier, Les démocrates belges de 1789, Bruxelles, 1930.
- Carlo Bronne, Financiers et comédiens au XVIIIe siècle, Bruxelles, Goemaere, 1969.
- Claude Bruneel, Les grands commis du gouvernement des Pays-Bas autrichiens, Bruxelles, 2001, p. 646.
- Michèle Galand, « Noblesse d’affaires dans les Pays-Bas autrichiens : Adrien Ange de Walckiers (1721-1799) », dans : Patrons, gens d’affaires et banquiers. Hommages à Ginette Kurgan-van Hentenryk, (S. Jaumain et K. Bertrams éditeurs), Bruxelles, 2004, p. 107-116.
- Suzanne Tassier, « Édouard de Walckiers promoteur de l'union des Belges et des Liégeois, 1792 », Revue de l'Université de Bruxelles, décembre 1938-janvier 1939, no. 2, p. 139-165
- Madame de Staël, Correspondance générale, t. III, édition de Béatrice Jasinski, Pauvert, 1968, p. 27.
- Fiche généalogique de Joseph Édouard Sébastien de Walckiers de Tronchiennes
