= Carlo Bronne =

Belgian historian, magistrate and writer

Baron Carlo Bronne (29 May 1901 - 25 July 1987) was a Belgian historian, magistrate and writer. He was born on 29 May 1901 in Liège and died on 25 July 1987 in Villance.

== Biography ==
Born in Liège, Carlo Bronne was a writer made Baron of Belgium, he mainly wrote about the history of his home country, he was a member of the Institut de France and the Académie royale de langue et de littérature françaises de Belgique, and occupied the seat of Georges Virrès in the latter.

He signed the petition La Wallonie en alerte in 1947, a petition demanding that Wallonia's number of seats in the national assembly would not be revised after the census showed that it was now a minority compared to Flanders in Belgium until a settlement could be found.

In 1975, he becomes the recipient of the Prix quinquennal de litterature for all of his works.

== Works ==
- Bronne (Carlo), Albert Ier le roi sans terre, Bruxelles, Paul Legrain, 1983.
- Bronne (Carlo), Belles étrangères en Belgique, Bruxelles, Didier Hatier, 1986.
- Bronne (Carlo), Bleu d'Ardenne, Bruxelles, André De Rache, 1969.
- Bronne (Carlo), Compère qu'as-tu vu? Mémoires, Bruxelles, Louis Musin, 1975.
- Bronne (Carlo), Des Andes au Kremlin, Bruxelles, Goemaere, 1956.
- Bronne (Carlo), Esquisses au crayon tendre, Bruxelles, éditions Charles Dessart, 1942.
- Bronne (Carlo), Esquisses au crayon tendre, suivi de la Porte d'exil, Bruxelles, Biblis, 1954.
- Bronne (Carlo), Financiers et comédiens au XVIII siècle, Bruxelles, Goemaere, 1969.
- Bronne (Carlo), Hommes de cœur et femmes de tête, Bruxelles, Goemaere, 1958.
- Bronne (Carlo), Hôtel de l'Aigle Noire, Bruxelles, éditions du Mont des Arts, 1954, 464/3000 copy.
- Bronne (Carlo), Joseph Lebeau, Bruxelles, La Renaissance du livre, 1944.
- Bronne (Carlo), Jules Van Praet, conseiller et confident de Léopold Ier, Bruxelles, la belgothèque/Paul Legrain, 1983.
- Bronne (Carlo), L'Amalgame ou la Belgique de 1814 à 1830, Bruxelles, Paul Legrain, new edition of the original of 1948 (prix quinquennal de l'essai 1950).
- Bronne (Carlo), La Comtesse Le Hon, Bruxelles, La Renaissance du Livre, 1951.
- Bronne (Carlo), La Galerie des ancêtres, Bruxelles, La Renaissance du livre, 1950.
- Bronne (Carlo), La Marquise Arconati dernière châtelaine de Gaasbeek, Bruxelles, Les cahiers historiques, 1970 (original numbered edition : 714/1750)
- Bronne (Carlo), La Tapisserie royale, Bruxelles, Durendal, 1952.
- Bronne (Carlo), Le Promenoir des amis, Bruxelles, André De Rache, 1967.
- Bronne (Carlo), Le Temps des vendanges, Mémoires, Bruxelles, Louis Musin éditeur, 1976.
- Bronne (Carlo), Léopold Ier et son temps, Bruxelles, 1980.
- Bronne (Carlo), Les Abeilles du manteau, Bruxelles, La Renaissance du livre, 1939 (anotated copy on van Gelder 20/30 paper)
- Bronne (Carlo), Les Roses de cire, Bruxelles, André De Rache éditeur, 1972.
- Bronne (Carlo), Un Américain en Ardenne, Bruxelles, André De Rache, 1974.
- Bronne (Carlo), La Conspiration des paniers percés, Ed. B. Goemare, 1959
