= Leopold I of Belgium =

King of the Belgians from 1831 to 1865

Leopold I
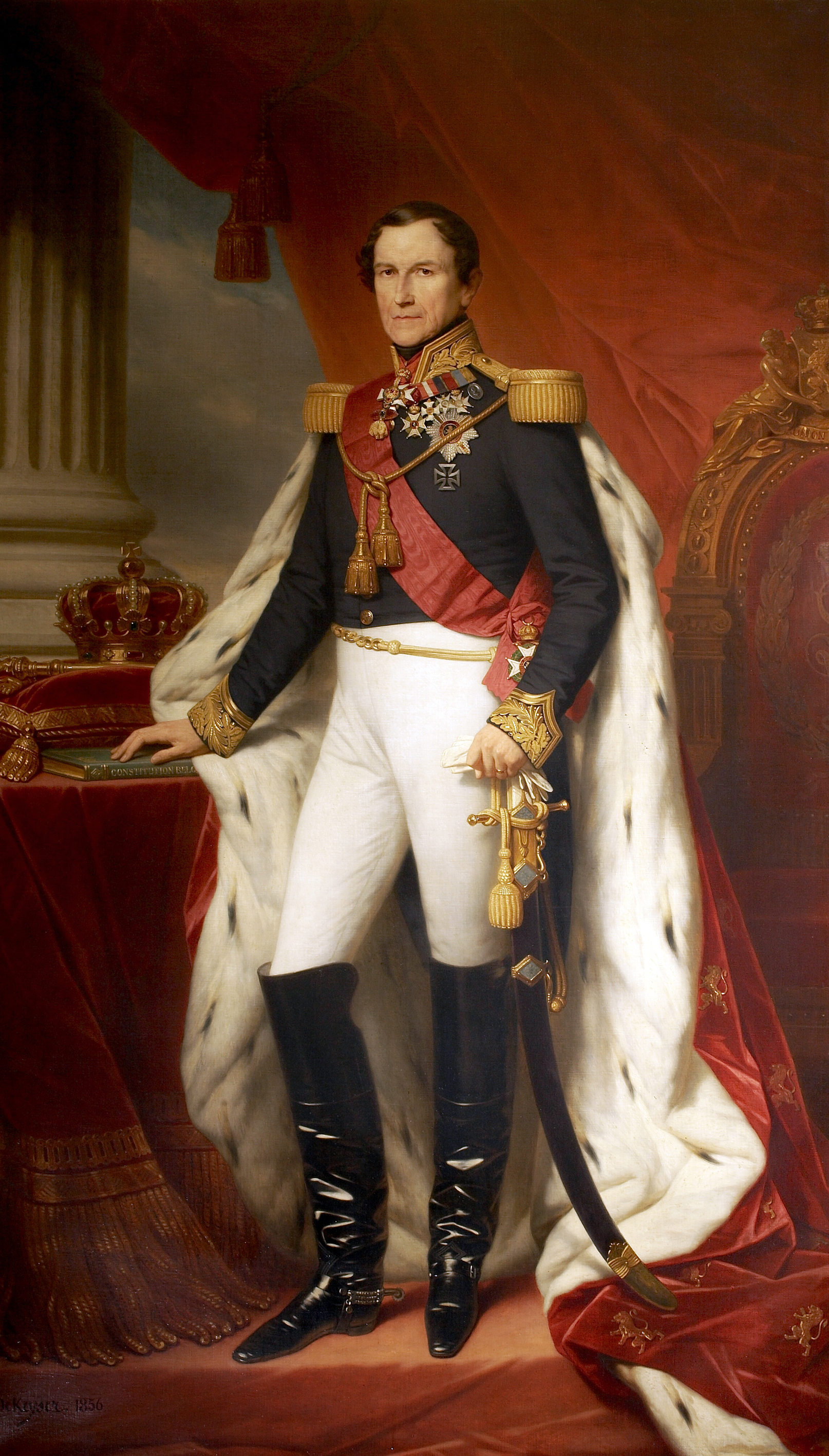
- Portrait by Nicaise de Keyser, 1856

King of the Belgians
- Reign: 21 July 1831 – 10 December 1865
- Predecessor: Monarchy established; Erasme Louis Surlet de Chokier as Regent
- Successor: Leopold II
- Born: Prince Leopold of Saxe-Coburg-Saalfeld; 16 December 1790; Ehrenburg Palace, Coburg, Saxe-Coburg-Saalfeld
- Died: 10 December 1865 (aged 74); Castle of Laeken, Brussels, Belgium
- Burial: 16 December 1865; Church of Our Lady of Laeken
- Spouses: Charlotte of Wales (m. 1816; died 1817) Louise of Orléans (m. 1832; died 1850)
- Issue Detail: Louis Philippe, Crown Prince of Belgium; Leopold II, King of the Belgians; Prince Philippe, Count of Flanders; Charlotte, Empress of Mexico; Illegitimate: George von Eppinghoven; Arthur von Eppinghoven
Names
- German: Leopold Georg Christian Friedrich; French: Léopold Georges Christian Frédéric; Dutch: Leopold Joris Christiaan Frederik; English: Leopold George Christian Frederick
- House: Saxe-Coburg-Saalfeld (until 1826); Saxe-Coburg and Gotha (from 1826)
- Father: Francis, Duke of Saxe-Coburg-Saalfeld
- Mother: Countess Augusta Reuss of Ebersdorf
- Religion: Lutheran
- Military career
- Allegiance: Saxe-Coburg-Saalfeld; Saxe-Coburg and Gotha; Russian Empire; United Kingdom of Great Britain and Ireland; Kingdom of Belgium
- Rank: Lieutenant General (Russia); Field Marshal (United Kingdom); Commander-in-Chief (Belgium)

Leopold I (Leopold George Christian Frederick; (Note: German: Leopold Georg Christian Friedrich; French: Léopold Georges Chrétien Frédéric; Dutch: Leopold Joris Christiaan Frederik) 16 December 1790 – 10 December 1865) was the first king of the Belgians, reigning from 21 July 1831 until his death in 1865.

The youngest son of Francis, Duke of Saxe-Coburg-Saalfeld, Leopold took a commission in the Imperial Russian Army and fought against Napoleon after French troops overran Saxe-Coburg during the Napoleonic Wars. After Napoleon's defeat, Leopold moved to the United Kingdom, where in 1816 he married Princess Charlotte of Wales, the only child of the British Prince Regent (later George IV). Leopold and Charlotte's marriage was happy, but it ended after a year and a half when Charlotte died after delivering a stillborn son. Leopold continued to enjoy considerable status in Britain. As the uncle of Queen Victoria through his sister, he played a major role in the life of Victoria and often acted as her father figure including arranging her marriage with his nephew Prince Albert of Saxe-Coburg and Gotha.

After the Greek War of Independence, Leopold was offered the throne of Greece under the 1830 London Protocol that created an independent Greek state, but turned it down, believing it to be too precarious. Instead, he accepted the throne of Belgium in 1831 following the country's independence in 1830. The Belgian government offered the position to Leopold because of his diplomatic connections with royal houses across Europe, and because as the British-backed candidate, he was not affiliated with other powers, such as France, which were believed to have territorial ambitions in Belgium which might threaten the European balance of power created by the 1815 Congress of Vienna.

Leopold took his oath as King of the Belgians on 21 July 1831, an event commemorated annually as Belgian National Day. The following year, he married Princess Louise of Orléans, with whom he had four children. He also had two illegitimate sons by his mistress, Arcadie Claret. Leopold's reign was marked by attempts by the Dutch to recapture Belgium and, later, by internal political division between Liberals and Catholics. Leopold was considered a liberal Protestant ruler and encouraged economic modernisation, playing an important role in funding the creation of Belgium's first railway in 1835 and subsequent industrialisation. As a result of the ambiguities in the Belgian Constitution, Leopold was able to slightly expand the monarch's powers during his reign and assumed multiple ministries. He also played an important role in stopping the spread of the Revolutions of 1848 into Belgium. He died in 1865 and was succeeded by his son, Leopold II.

== Early life ==
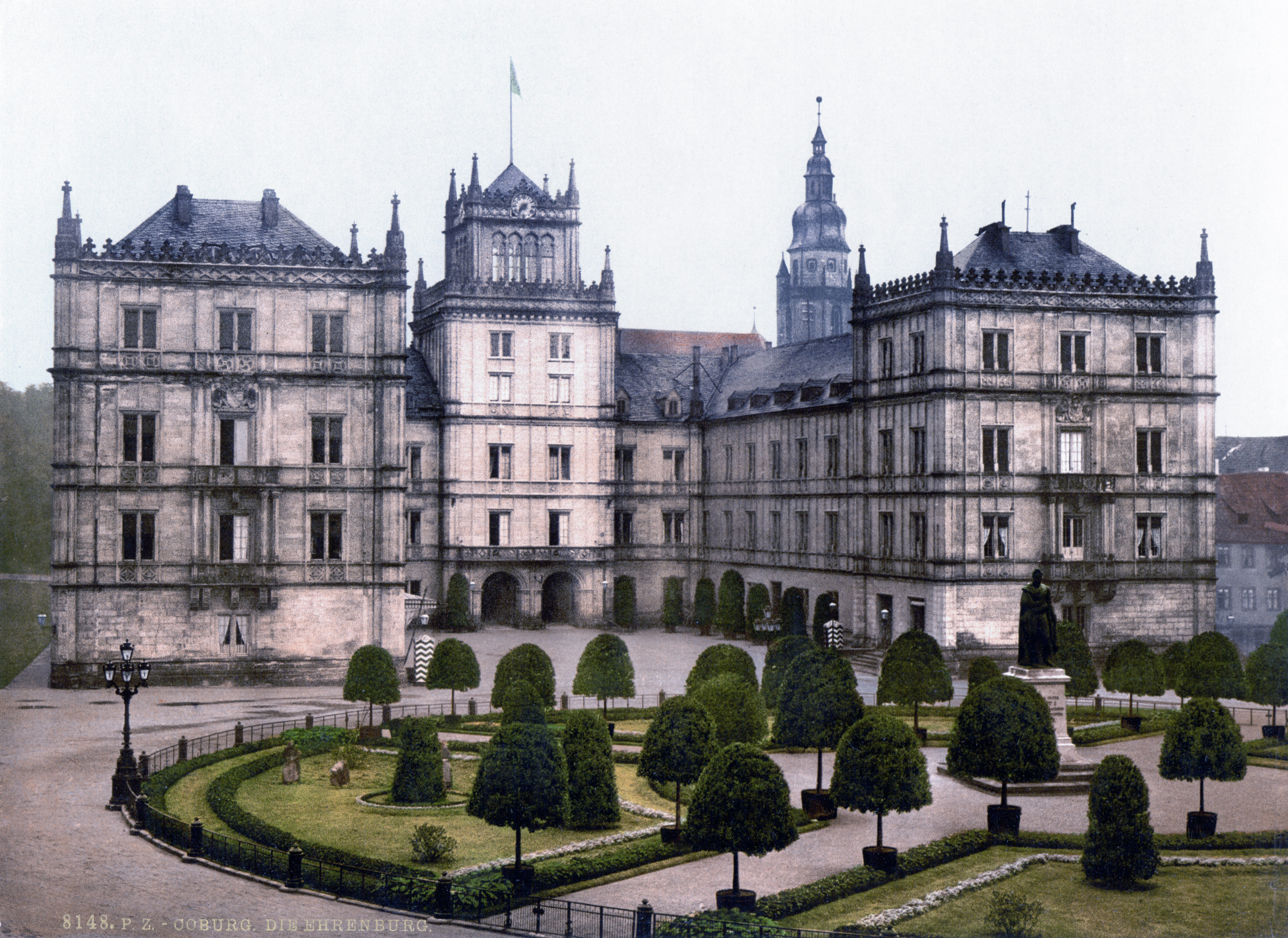
Ehrenburg Palace in Coburg, where Leopold was born in 1790, pictured c. 1900

Leopold was born at Ehrenburg Palace in Coburg in the small German duchy of Saxe-Coburg-Saalfeld in modern-day Bavaria on 16 December 1790. He was the eighth child and third and youngest surviving son of Francis, Duke of Saxe-Coburg-Saalfeld by his second wife, Countess Augusta Reuss of Ebersdorf. In 1826, Saxe-Coburg had acquired the city of Gotha from the neighbouring Duchy of Saxe-Gotha-Altenburg and gave up Saalfeld to Saxe-Meiningen, becoming Saxe-Coburg and Gotha. The dynasty of this name was therefore founded by Leopold's eldest brother, Ernest I, Duke of Saxe-Coburg and Gotha, the father of Albert, Prince Consort of the United Kingdom. Leopold was baptised on 17 December 1790, with his baptismal name remaining the same as his birth name, in honour of Leopold II, Holy Roman Emperor. Leopold's paternal grandmother, Princess Sophie Antoinette of Brunswick-Wolfenbüttel, often assisted in parenting duties and signalled that he was her favourite grandson.

From 1797, Leopold was tutored by Charles-Theodore Hoflender, a graduate of the University of Jena and a professor in Coburg. Under Hoflender, he studied Biblical history, Christianity, mathematics and languages, including Greek, Latin and Russian. In 1799, Leopold and his siblings also became tutored by Johann Philipp Hohnbaum, who specialised in teaching physical education and in teaching history of Great Britain, the Holy Roman Empire and Saxony. Hohnbaum cited that Leopold was fascinated by history and conflicts such as the Thirty Years War. Lutheran pastor Gottlieb Scheler taught Leopold catechism. Historian Olivier Defrance wrote that Scheler's teaching of Pietism had a lasting influence on Leopold. From 1804, aged thirteen, Leopold kept a diary and learnt English, French and Italian. Leopold often heard stories of military experience from his great-uncle, Prince Josias of Saxe-Coburg-Saalfeld, and inherited his father's passion for pigeon racing and floriculture.

== Pre-regnal years ==
=== Military career ===
==== Russian Imperial army ====
In 1796, Leopold's older sister, Princess Juliane of Saxe-Coburg-Saalfeld, married Grand Duke Konstantin Pavlovich of Russia, making the House of Romanov her house by marriage. The following year, at just six years old, Leopold received an honorary Russian military title in the Izmaylovsky Regiment, part of the Imperial Guard, in the Imperial Russian Army: the rank of captain on 7 May 1797 and subsequently colonel on 11 September 1798. Leopold also began to specialise in the Russian language. On 19 March 1801, he was transferred to the Imperial Guard Cavalry Regiment, when six years later, aged twelve, he received a promotion to the rank of major general.

In 1805, at fourteen years old, Leopold accompanied his older brother, Ernest, Hereditary Duke of Saxe-Coburg and Gotha, to Moravia, where the headquarters of Alexander I, Emperor of Russia were located; however, neither Leopold nor Ernest partook in combat. Following the Battle of Austerlitz, during the Napoleonic Wars, French troops occupied the Duchy of Saxe-Coburg in 1806. Leopold and his father, Francis, took refuge in Saalfeld; however, Francis died on 9 December 1806, six days before the Treaty of Poznan assigned the Duchy to the Confederation of the Rhine, thus abolishing the Duchy's sovereignty. When Napoleon learned that Ernest had previously fought against the French, he removed the Duchy from the Confederation, before seizing the properties of Leopold's family. Leopold and his mother were confined to a section of one of the confiscated castles and were not let out. During this time, Leopold wrote to his sister, Princess Sophie of Saxe-Coburg-Saalfeld: "The poor country of Cobourg is terribly penalized; It must pay 981,000 francs; it's huge. Our coffers and our estates, in short all our income, were confiscated by the Emperor Napoleon. No appanage can be paid." After intervention by the Russian Emperor, Napoleon declared the Duchy to be part of the Confederation of the Rhine once more by adding it to the Treaty of Tilsit. Ernest as the new reigning Duke was allowed to return to Coburg in July 1807.

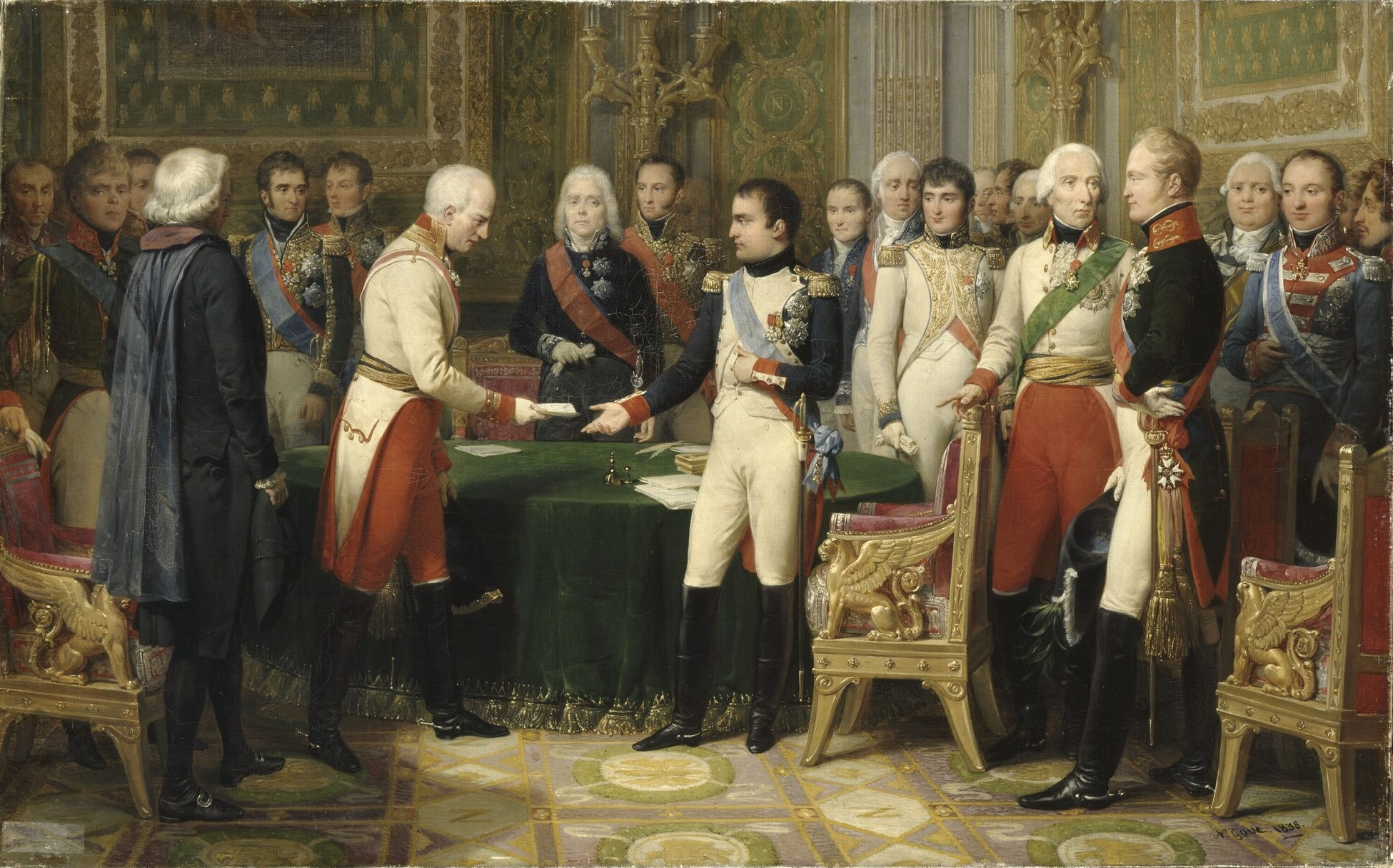
Napoleon and Alexander I depicted at the Congress of Erfurt

Leopold soon went to Paris where he became part of the Imperial Court of Napoleon. Napoleon's wife, Joséphine de Beauharnais, took a protective attitude of Leopold, who met Napoleon in October 1808. According to the historian Carlo Bronne, Napoleon was in awe of Leopold and briefly considered making him his aide-de-camp. In Spring 1808, Leopold contracted typhoid fever and when he recovered, he shortly became regent of Saxe-Coburg-Saalfeld when Ernest visited Russia. Napoleon later offered Leopold the position of adjutant, but he refused and instead went to Russia to take up a military career in the Imperial Russian cavalry, which then later went to war with France. Leopold accompanied Emperor Alexander I in September 1808 and represented his home Duchy at the Congress of Erfurt, where Napoleon failed to strengthen Franco-Russian relations while the Duchy's interests were ignored. He wrote to Alexander I for assistance, leading to Napoleon demanding that he resign from the Russian army.

==== Napoleonic battles ====
In Autumn 1810, Ernest asked Leopold to find financial aid for the Duchy, which was lacking soldiers and had been badly affected by war and its previous occupation. Leopold met Napoleon, who refused to aid the Duchy, but offered that Leopold join the French army. Leopold strongly refused. In May 1811, Leopold went to Munich and although he was unsuccessful in securing funding, he managed to persuade Maximilian I Joseph of Bavaria to return small territories that Bavaria had previously annexed from the Duchy. Leopold was hailed in the media for this achievement. Following his visit to Munich, Leopold travelled to Vienna, then to various Italian cities during the winter. He wrote: "The years of 1810 and 1811 were quite calm. I was disappointed to find myself forbidden from serving in Russia by Napoleon who held my brother responsible, because he knew that otherwise he would not have been able to prevent me." In March 1813, Leopold was finally allowed to rejoin the Russian Imperial army.

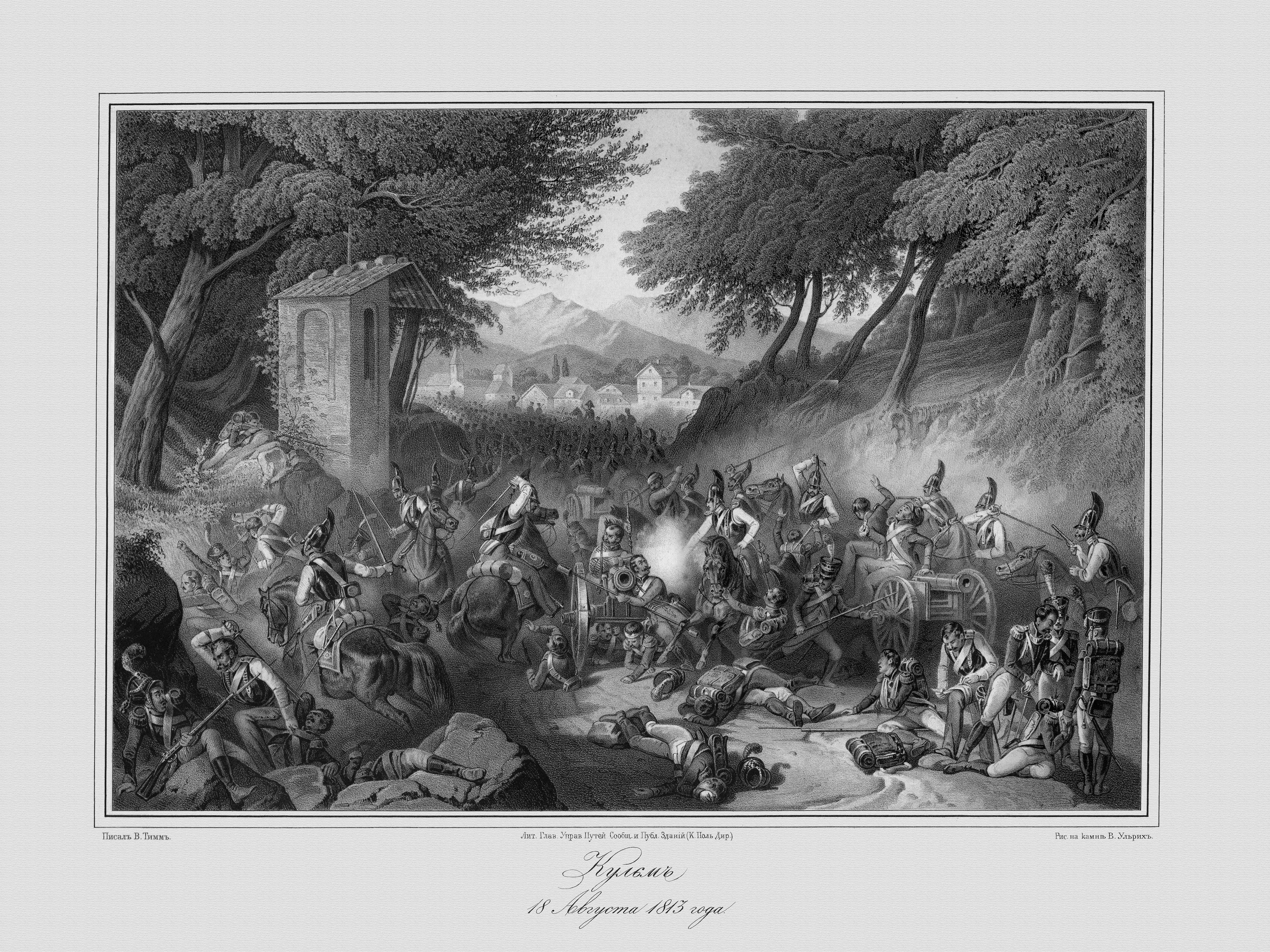
The charge of the cuirassiers at the Battle of Kulm

During 1813, Leopold was an active member of the Russian army and participated in the liberation of German states from Napoleonic France. On 28 February 1813, after the signing of the Treaty of Kalisz, Leopold said to Emperor Alexander, "I was the first German Prince who joined the liberating army". Leopold participated in multiple conflicts against French troops, including the Battle of Lützen, Battle of Bautzen and Battle of Leipzig. He worked closely with his brother-in-law, Grand Duke Konstantin Pavlovich of Russia, during this time. On 26 August 1813, Leopold helped Duke Eugen of Württemberg escape his occupiers. Three days later, Leopold was nearly captured by French forces. Later, on 29 and 30 August 1813, Leopold fought in the Battle of Kulm as the head of his cuirassier division. The battle was a French loss, and Leopold was decorated for his participation with the Cross of St. George, the Order of St. Andrew, the Order of Alexander Nevsky, the Order of Saint Anna and the Kulm Cross. Additionally, he was promoted to Major General in the Russian Army.

Leopold and Konstantin Pavlovich were unsuccessful in reuniting with Leopold's sister, Julianne, in Bern in January 1814. Leopold entered France with the Russian army on 30 January. On 1 February, he participated in the Battle of Brienne, which resulted in the occupation of Troyes. Additionally, during the Battle of Arcis-sur-Aube, Leopold commanded the right wing on the army, with France successfully defeated, before Paris was marched on four days later. On 31 March, Leopold too entered Paris, as Napoleon fell, to which Leopold commented: "This is the extent to which prudence has humiliated this tyrant, to the horror of all those who would want to follow his example." Leopold and Ernest represented the Duchy of Saxe-Coburg-Saalfeld at the Congress of Vienna. The Kingdom of Prussia, which Leopold and the Russian Imperial army had fought alongside, was opposed to any gains made by the Duchy, which had been against the annexation of Saxony, an ally of France. During the Congress, Leopold held audience with Archduke John of Austria and Chancellor Klemens von Metternich. When Napoleon returned from exile in March 1815, Leopold commanded a Russian cavalry brigade as a lieutenant general, aged 25, on the outskirts of France, as Napoleon lost the Battle of Waterloo.

=== Marriage to Charlotte of Wales ===
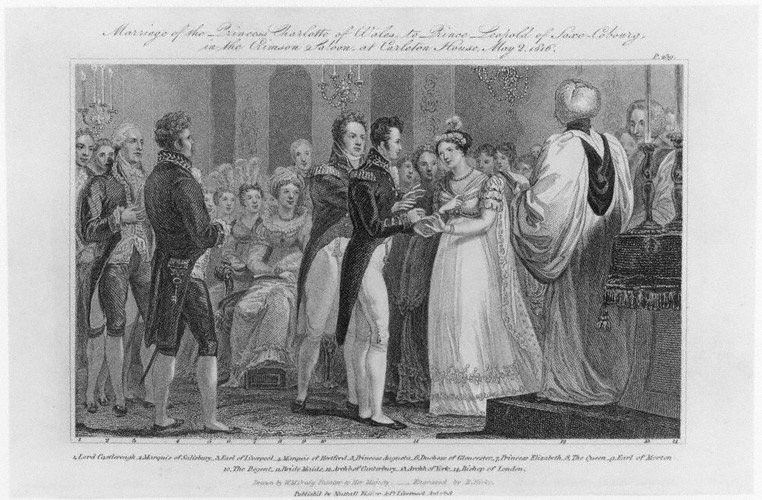
Engraving of the wedding of Charlotte and Leopold in 1816

Naturalization of Prince Leopold Act 1816
- Act of Parliament
- Parliament of the United Kingdom
- Long title: An Act far exhibiting a Bill in this present Parliament, for naturalizing His Serene Highness Leopold George Frederick Duke of Saxe, Margrave of Meissen, Landgrave of Thuringuen, Prince of Cobourg of Saalfeld.
- Citation: 56 Geo. 3. c. 12

Dates
- Royal assent: 28 March 1816
- Commencement: 28 March 1816 (Note: The Acts of Parliament (Commencement) Act 1793.)
- Repealed: 5 August 1873
Other legislation
Repealed by	Statute Law Revision Act 1873
Relates to	Naturalization of Prince Leopold (No. 2) Act 1816

Status: Repealed

Text of statute as originally enacted

Naturalization of Prince Leopold (No. 2) Act 1816
- Act of Parliament
- Parliament of the United Kingdom
- Long title: An Act for the Naturalization of His Serene Highness Leopold George Frederick Duke of Saxe, Margrave of Meissen, Landgrave of Thuringuen, Prince of Cobourg of Saalfeld; and settling his Precedence.
- Citation: 56 Geo. 3. c. 13

Dates
- Royal assent: 29 March 1816
- Commencement: 29 March 1816
- Repealed: 5 August 1873
Other legislation
Repealed by	Statute Law Revision Act 1873
Relates to	Naturalization of Prince Leopold Act 1816

Status: Repealed

Text of statute as originally enacted

In Spring 1814, Leopold accompanied Emperor Alexander to England, where Princess Charlotte of Wales was seeking a spouse. Charlotte was the only legitimate child of Prince George, Prince Regent (later George IV), and therefore second in line to the British throne. George had hoped Charlotte would marry William, Prince of Orange, but Charlotte favoured Leopold. Emperor Alexander was also opposed to Charlotte marrying William as he believed a future personal union between Great Britain and the Netherlands would become a maritime superpower and dominate the seas. Leopold and Charlotte lost contact for months, and the latter often wrote to the former asking that he return to Britain to propose to her. Leopold received British citizenship in March 1816. Finally, the pair married at Carlton House in London on 2 May 1816. Although George was displeased, he found Leopold to be charming and possessing every quality to make his daughter happy, and so approved their marriage. The same year Leopold received an honorary commission to the rank of Field Marshal and Knight of the Order of the Garter. The Regent also considered making Leopold a royal duke, the Duke of Kendal, though the plan was abandoned due to government fears that it would draw Leopold into party politics and would be viewed as a demotion for Charlotte. The couple lived initially at Camelford House in Park Lane, and then at Marlborough House in The Mall.

Leopold and Charlotte moved into Claremont House in August 1816. When Charlotte later suffered a miscarriage, Leopold became concerned for her health. When Charlotte again fell pregnant, she was advised by her obstetrician, Sir Richard Croft, to drastically reduce her diet; however, Leopold's physician, Christian Stockmar, heavily disagreed with this advice. Charlotte gave birth to a stillborn son on 5 November 1817. She suffered complications and, just after midnight on 6 November, also died. Leopold was said to have been heartbroken by Charlotte's death.

Deep down, I was made for a life of family intimacy [...]. I wanted to be quiet and happy with my mouse [Charlotte] and nothing more [...] Charlotte was a very pretty woman and she possessed to a very high degree of what the English call countenance.

— Leopold writing to his sister upon Charlotte's death.

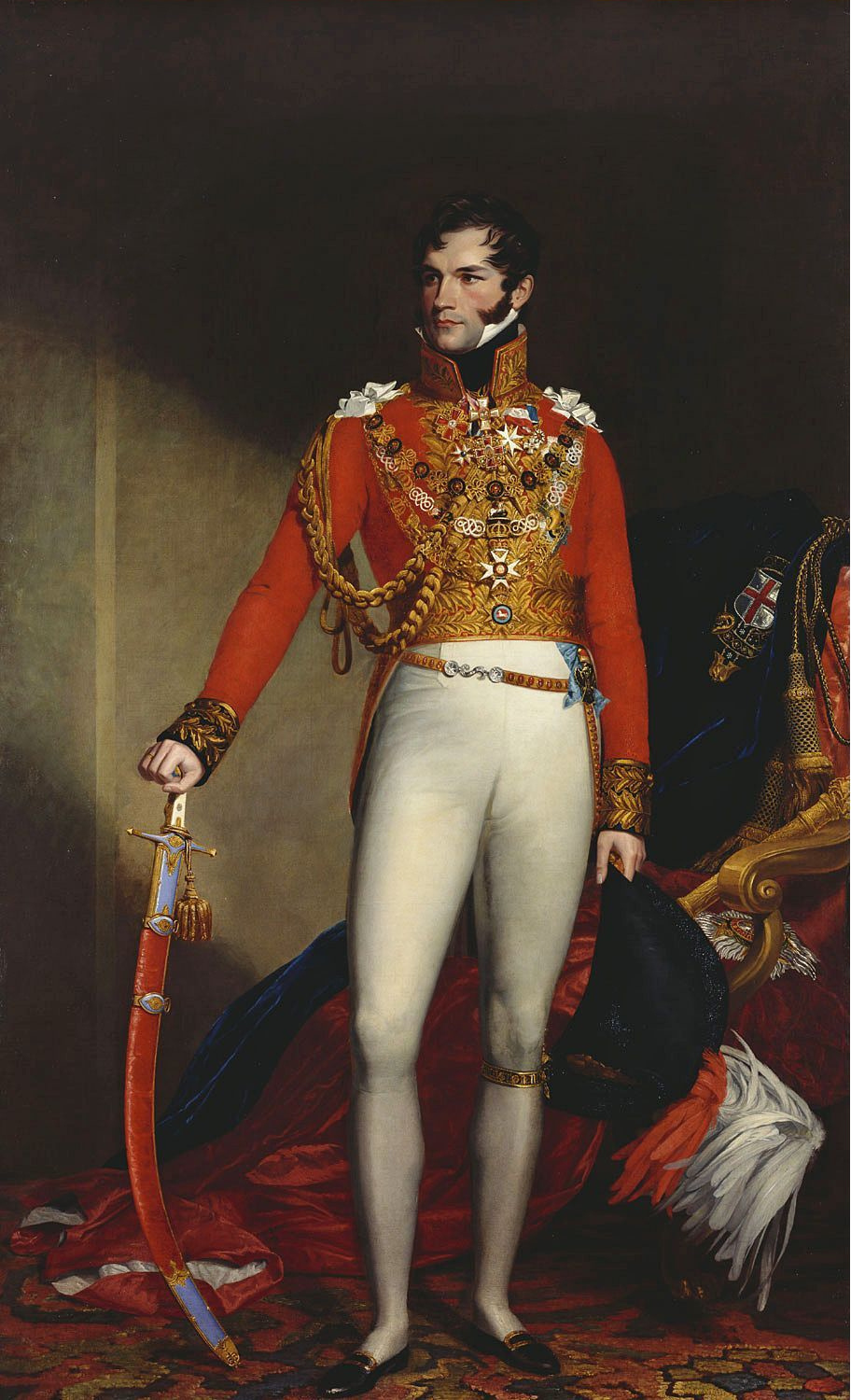
Portrait of Leopold by George Dawe c. 1818–1825

Had Charlotte survived, she would have become queen of the United Kingdom on the death of her father and Leopold presumably would have assumed the role of prince consort, later taken by his nephew Albert of Saxe-Coburg and Gotha. Stockmar, who became Leopold's private secretary, advised him to stay in Britain rather than returning to Coburg and despite Charlotte's death, George granted Leopold the British style of Royal Highness by Order in Council on 6 April 1818. However, the British public was opposed to the annuity of 50,000 pounds sterling paid by the British government to Leopold, who was no longer even a member of the British royal family. From 1828 to 1829, Leopold had an affair with the actress Caroline Bauer, who bore a striking resemblance to Charlotte. Caroline was a cousin of Stockmar. She came to England with her mother and took up residence at Longwood House, a few miles from Claremont House. But, by mid-1829, the liaison was over, and the actress and her mother returned to Berlin. Many years later, in memoirs published after her death, she declared that she and Leopold had engaged in a morganatic marriage and that he had bestowed upon her the title of Countess Montgomery. He would have broken this marriage when the possibility arose that he could become King of Greece. The son of Stockmar denied that these events ever happened, and indeed no records have been found of a civil or religious marriage with the actress.

Following Charlotte's death, Leopold assisted members of his family in acceding to various European thrones. He encouraged his sister, Princess Victoria of Saxe-Coburg-Saalfeld, to marry George's brother, Prince Edward, Duke of Kent and Strathearn, after her first husband, Emich Carl, 2nd Prince of Leiningen, had died. Victoria and Edward were the parents of the future Queen Victoria, who was born in 1819 and lost her father in 1820. Leopold allowed her and her mother to live with him in Claremont House and convinced George, who was now monarch, that he should give apartments in Kensington Palace to them. Leopold went on to support George's wife, Caroline of Brunswick, in marital disputes and even visited Caroline during George's crowning, leading to disdain from George. Leopold nonetheless remained in Britain for another fourteen years after the death of Charlotte but regularly travelled Europe.

In 1819, Leopold received Niederfüllbach Castle in Coburg and began preparing to make it his main residence. Leopold's brother, Ernest, had married Princess Louise of Saxe-Gotha-Altenburg, who went on to inherit the Duchy of Saxe-Gotha, though Ernest insisted he reigned over it. From there, Ernest's Duchy of Saxe-Coburg-Saalfeld and Louise's Duchy of Saxe-Gotha merged to form the Duchy of Saxe-Coburg and Gotha. Before the couple divorced in 1826, Ernest and Louise had two sons, the future Ernest II, Duke of Saxe-Coburg and Gotha, and Albert, who went on to marry Queen Victoria. Whilst in Paris, Leopold was encouraged to marry Marie-Caroline of Bourbon-Two Sicilies, Duchess of Berry, the widowed daughter-in-law of Charles X of France; however, Leopold declined due to differing views and opinions on matters with the French royal house.

=== Refusal of the Greek throne ===
Following a Greek rebellion against the Ottoman Empire, Leopold was offered the throne of an independent Greece as part of the London Protocol of February 1830, which stipulated that the new monarch could not be of Great Britain, France or Russia.

Though Leopold resided in Britain, he was not considered a member of the British royal family as he was not of the House of Hanover. He was quite popular across Europe for his role in the Napoleonic wars and, according to Defrance, was often mentioned in Greek "anglophile circles". Despite popularity, he was often in dispute with George and the British government, who supported Leopold as a candidate for the Greek throne and subsequently demanded he give up his British possessions. Leopold eventually agreed and accepted this offer from Duke of Wellington, the prime minister of the United Kingdom, and his Cabinet. However, Leopold was still anxious to accept the Greek throne and demanded certain conditions, including having the Greco-Ottoman border changed in Greece's favour by amending the border crossing the Achelous River and Valley, receiving financial and military aid while the state was being set up, and having protection of Greece by the Great Powers from foreign aggression. He argued that this zone of protection should be extended all the way to Samos and Crete, whose populations had been active in the Greek War of Independence. Most of his demands were agreed to in a series of discussions, with particular priority in protecting the majority Christian inhabitants of the Greek islands. With the Great Powers mainly satisfied, they signed new international protocol, officially giving Leopold, "the son-in-law of George IV", the title of "Sovereign Prince of Greece". A few days later, on 28 February 1830, Leopold officially accepted the Greek crown.

Leopold contacted Ioannis Kapodistrias, the de facto Governor of the Greek State, who he had known since the Napoleonic Wars. Leopold asked of him in his letters to provide assistance in his accession to the throne; however, Kapodistrias' reply on 6 April was not of reassuring nature. Kapodistrias insisted that Leopold's border changes did not satisfy Greece, provoked the Ottoman Empire and would need to be ratified by the legislature. Contrary to historians Michel Lhéritier and Édouard Driault, Defrance claims that Kapodistrias's motive was to possibly intimidate Leopold. Kapodistrias also very strongly encouraged Leopold to convert to Greek Orthodoxy to the wishes of the Greek people, but Leopold was displeased by this. Later that month, the Greek Senate drafted a memorandum addressed to Leopold to welcome him and give a list of requests of the Greek people, including the border issue, the inclusion of Samos, Crete and Psara in the new Greek nation and the religion of Leopold. From London, Leopold worked to achieve these requests and even succeeded in increasing loans granted to Greece from 12 million to 60 million francs; however, he failed to resolve the border dispute and annex Crete from the Ottoman Empire. Feeling the Greek population was too demanding and precarious, Leopold turned down the offer to become King of Greece on 17 May 1830. The role would subsequently be accepted by Otto of Wittelsbach in May 1832 who ruled until he was finally deposed in October 1862. Otto would then be replaced by the House of Glücksburg, with Prince Wilhelm of Denmark becoming George I of Greece.

== Reign ==
=== Acceptance of the Belgian throne ===
==== Search for a monarch ====
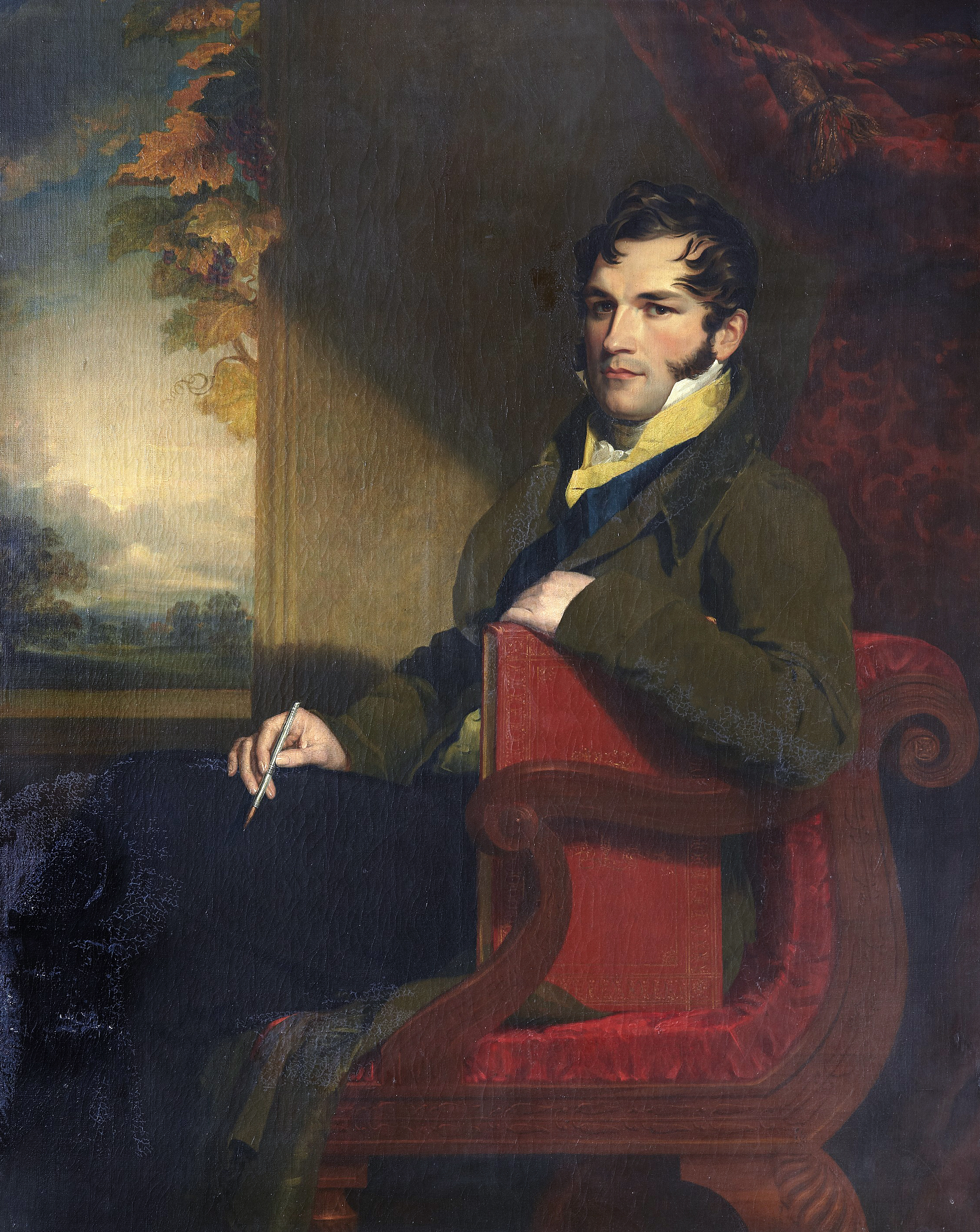
Prince Leopold, by Samuel William Reynolds, c. 1820s

At the end of August 1830, rebels in the Southern provinces (modern-day Belgium) of the United Netherlands rose up against Dutch rule. The rising, which began in Brussels, pushed the Dutch army back, and the rebels defended themselves against a Dutch attack. International powers meeting in London agreed to support the independence of Belgium, even though the Dutch refused to recognize the new state. In November 1830, a National Congress was established in Belgium to create a constitution for the new state. Fears of "mob rule" associated with republicanism after the French Revolution of 1789, as well as the example of the recent, liberal July Revolution in France, led the Congress to decide that Belgium would be a popular, constitutional monarchy. The choice of candidates for the position was one of the most controversial issues faced by the revolutionaries. The Congress refused to consider any candidate from the Dutch ruling house of Orange-Nassau. Some Orangists had hoped to offer the position to William I or his son, William, Prince of Orange, which would bring Belgium into personal union with the Netherlands like Luxembourg. The Great Powers also worried that a candidate from another state could risk destabilizing the international balance of power and lobbied for a neutral candidate.

Eventually the Congress was able to draw up a shortlist. The viable possibilities were felt to be Auguste of Leuchtenberg, son of Eugène de Beauharnais, and Louis, Duke of Nemours, son of Louis Philippe I of France. All the candidates were French and the choice between them was principally between choosing the Bonapartism of Beauharnais or Leuchtenberg and supporting the July Monarchy of Louis Philippe. Louis Philippe realized that the choice of either of the Bonapartists could be the first stage of a coup against him, but that his son would also be unacceptable to other European powers suspicious of French intentions. Nemours refused the offer. With no definitive choice in sight, Catholics and Liberals united to elect Erasme Louis Surlet de Chokier, a minor Belgian nobleman, as regent to buy more time for a definitive decision in February 1831.

Due to the opposition of previous candidates, the Belgian Congress proposed Leopold, who had been proposed at an early stage, but had been dropped because of French opposition. The problems caused by the French candidates and the increased international pressure for a solution led to his reconsideration. Leopold was known by the Congress due to his military past and a delegation of Belgian representatives was sent to London to meet Leopold. On 22 April, he was finally approached by the delegation at Marlborough House to officially offer him the throne. Leopold read over the Treaty of the Eighteen Articles prior to it being signed on 9 July 1831, officially separating Belgium and the Netherlands. The treaty also included the possibility of a repurchase of Luxembourg by Belgium. Despite all this, Leopold remained reluctant to accept the Belgian throne.

==== Accession ====
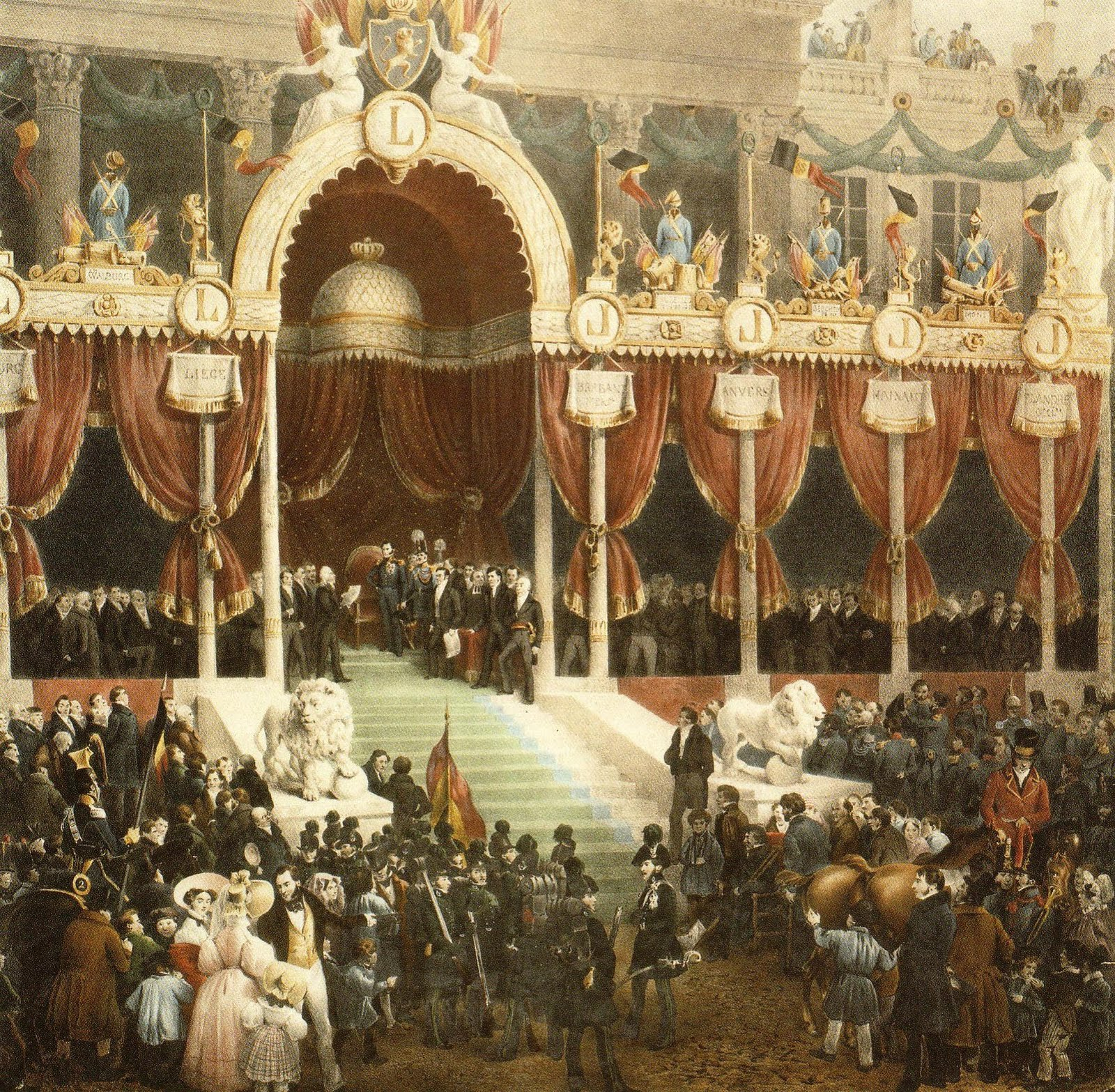
Leopold taking the constitutional oath during his enthronement, by Gustaf Wappers

On 16 July 1831, Leopold travelled from Dover to Calais on the royal yacht Crusader, deciding to accept the throne. The next day he drove by carriage to Dunkirk and entered Belgium at De Panne. Whilst travelling to Brussels on horseback, he was greeted with patriotic enthusiasm along his route. The accession ceremony took place on 21 July on the Place Royale in Brussels. A stand had been erected on the steps of the Church of St. James on Coudenberg, surrounded by the names of revolutionaries fallen during the fighting in 1830. After a ceremony of resignation by the regent, Leopold, dressed in the uniform of a Belgian lieutenant-general, swore loyalty to the constitution, under the supervision of congressman Jean-Baptiste Nothomb, and became king. Leopold said in his speech: "I have come hither to work for the welfare of this country, and to preserve, by my acceptance of the crown, the peace of Europe; whatever can contribute to these two things, I will do it; anything beyond that will be harmful." Leopold's enthronement has generally been used to mark the end of the revolution and the start of the Kingdom of Belgium and is celebrated each year as the Belgian national holiday.

=== Consolidation of independence ===
Although the Belgian Constitution to which Leopold swore gave the monarch command of the army only as an honorary title, Leopold signalled on multiple occasions that he would personally place himself in charge of the army if Belgium were to be attacked. The Belgian population was widely content with this due to his previous military experience. Less than two weeks after Leopold's accession, on 2 August 1831, the Netherlands invaded Belgium, starting the Ten Days' Campaign. Leopold immediately requested that Belgian prime minister, Joseph Lebeau, contact the foreign offices in London and Paris for assistance. Leopold here followed the Constitution, which forbade him personally from calling upon foreign powers without permission from the legislature, which at this time had not yet been elected. The small Belgian army was overwhelmed by the Dutch assault and was pushed back, and Leopold took command of a small force that defended the outskirts of Brussels. Leopold once again appealed to the French for support. The French promised support, and the arrival of their Armée du Nord in Belgium forced the Dutch to retreat. Great Britain refused to intervene. Eventually, the Netherlands accepted a diplomatic mediation and returned behind to the pre-war border. Skirmishes continued for eight years, but in April 1839, the two countries signed the Treaty of London, whereby the Dutch finally recognised Belgium's independence.

Leopold's personal monogram

Leopold's attitude during the war earned him both praise and criticism in the Belgian media. For example, an article in L'Indépendance Belge read, "The King of the Belgians, [...] showed rare composure and intrepidity. Always in the most perilous places, he was often obliged to fulfil both the functions of generalissimo and those of second lieutenant." However, an article the following day critiqued, "The approach of our troops repaired everything, but what is less repairable is the failure that the Belgians suffered in the opinion of Europe." Following the war and large losses that Belgium suffered, Leopold reorganised national defence, disbanded the Garde Civique and legislated the army's numbers at 80,000 men. When the Dutch abandoned Belgium, they left a garrison force that closed the Scheldt to Belgian shipping, meaning that the inland port of Antwerp was effectively useless. The Netherlands and the Dutch colonies in particular, which had been profitable markets for Belgian manufacturers before 1830, became totally closed to Belgian goods. The French Army of the North, which had helped Belgium considerably in the Ten Days' Campaign, defeated the Dutch army the following year and laid siege to Antwerp on 15 November 1832. However, the Dutch managed to burn down much of the city before its liberation, and subsequent fighting remained until the Netherlands was finally defeated on 23 December 1832. The Dutch government continued to refuse to recognise the Treaty of the Eighteen Articles and William I of the Netherlands organised in May 1833 an embargo of Dutch coasts. Belgian, British and Dutch delegations subsequently met in Zonhoven to resolve the matters, but Leopold left unsatisfied as no agreements were definitively made.

In April 1834, anti-Orangist riots broke out in Brussels and soon developed into protests in favour of Leopold. Several of the former residences of William's family in Belgium and hotels in Brussels were ransacked, leading to Leopold travelling in on horseback and convincing the protestors to disband by giving a speech. Leopold's advisers believed that peace had been restored and suggested he left, but soon after the Hotel of Trazegnies was also ransacked and the military were sent in. Over 115 people were arrested and seven were wounded, before the Belgian legislature passed a law punishing pro-Orangist propaganda. Subsequently, Leopold took charge of the Ministry of Foreign Affairs to deal with diplomatic clashes with the Netherlands, including the matter of Belgian claims to Dutch Limburg, which Leopold was unable to obtain, thus ruining his prospect for a new railway line through the region. He was successful however in reducing the country's debt to the Netherlands from 8,400,000 to 5,400,000 florins. The Netherlands would finally go on to recognise Belgian independence by signing the Treaty of London in 1839. The Dutch-Belgian border was agreed to on 8 August 1843 with the Treaty of Maastricht.

Leopold was generally unsatisfied with the amount of power allocated to the monarch in the Constitution, and sought to extend it wherever the Constitution was ambiguous or unclear while generally avoiding involvement in routine politics.

=== Marriage, family and residences ===
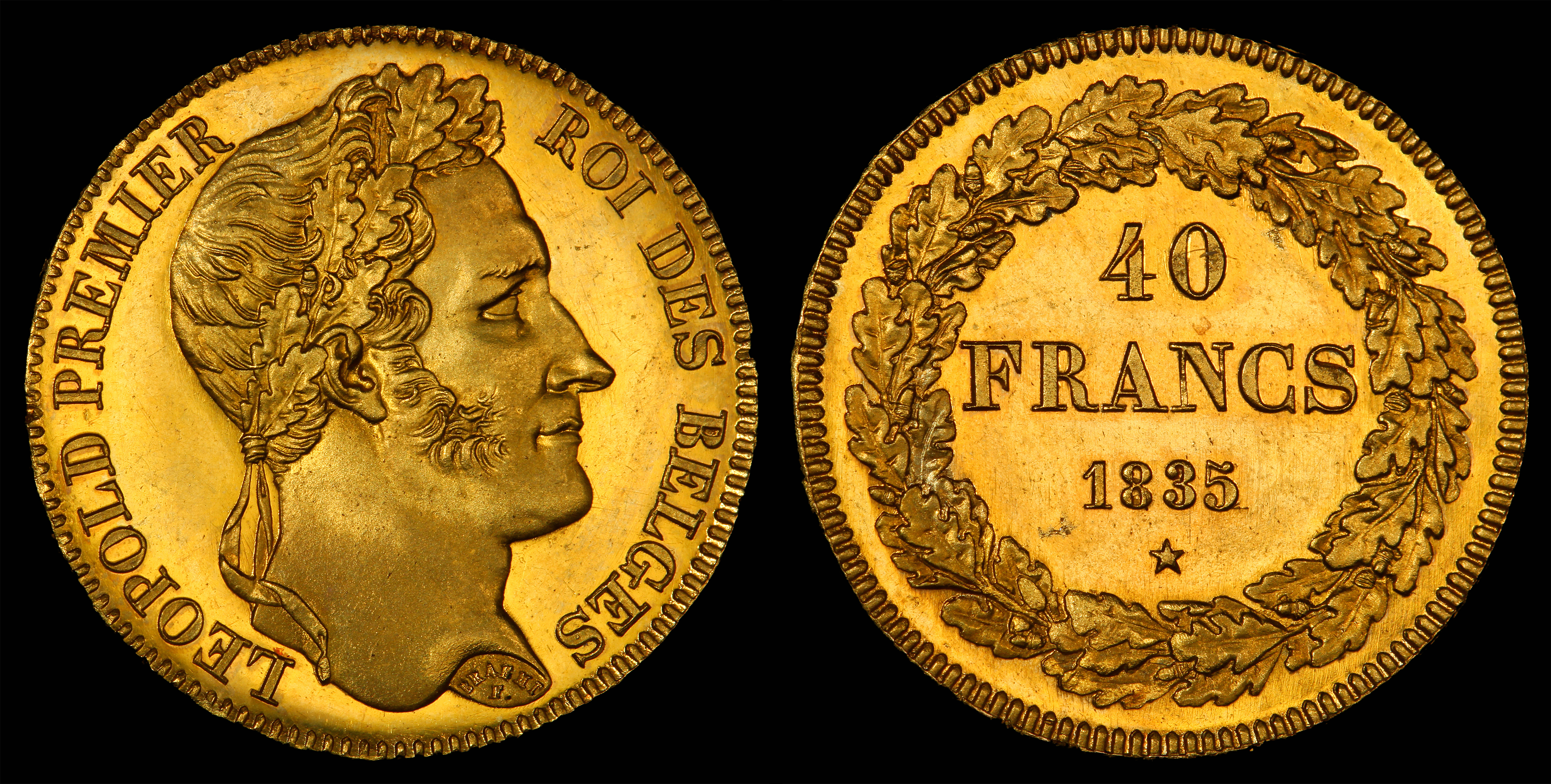
Leopold on a 40 franc coin in 1835

Though Leopold was now monarch, there was concern over the issue of dynastic succession with Leopold having no issue because of his widowed status. To strengthen ties with France, Leopold considered marrying a French princess and approached the king of the French, Louis Philippe I, who agreed to Leopold marrying his daughter, Louise of Orléans. They married on 9 August 1832 at the Château de Compiègne and participated in a civil ceremony, a Catholic service and a Lutheran blessing. Although the marriage was arranged, Patrick Roegiers writes that the pair found happiness in each other. Soon after their wedding, Leopold asked the government if Louise could be appointed regent while he travelled, but they unanimously opposed. Louise gave birth to their first son, Louis Philippe, on 24 July 1833; however, the infant died nine months later on 16 May 1834 from an inflammation of mucous membranes. Two years later, on 9 April 1835, Louise gave birth to a second son, Leopold. Two more children, Philippe and Charlotte, followed on 24 March 1837 and 7 June 1840 respectively.

Of his three royal residences, the Royal Palace of Antwerp, the Royal Palace of Brussels and the Castle of Laeken, Leopold chose the latter as it reminded him of his erstwhile British residence, Claremont House. There, Leopold and Louise lived a generally relaxed and quiet life, with Louise stating that "The King, his dog and I" only lived there. According to Bronne, they would wake up mid-morning, attend mass and then read through their mail, which was sent in from Paris. Louise was often excited to read Parisian mail as it often came from her own family. When receiving politicians, officials and members of Belgian aristocracy, Leopold would often engage in cue sports.

In 1844, Leopold met Arcadie Claret, the eighteen-year-old daughter of an officer in the Belgian army. They very soon after had an affair and Leopold encouraged her to marry to avoid being caught out. Claret married Ferdinand Meyer in 1845, who managed the royal stables and agreed to be her husband in return for financial compensation. However, Meyer soon left for Coburg to allow Leopold and Claret to continue their relationship. Claret was placed in a house near the Royal Palace of Brussels and was discovered as Leopold's mistress by the media, which also highlights Louise's declining health. Claret's house was attacked by the public for her use of palace carriages when going out. Leopold, per his advisors, encouraged Claret to have more restraint when travelling, but she left Belgium for Germany in October 1850. She eventually returned to Belgium and moved into the Château of Stuyvenberg. Leopold had two illegitimate sons, George and Arthur, by Claret. George von Eppinghoven was born in 1849, and Arthur von Eppinghoven in 1852. At Leopold's request, in 1862 his two sons were created Freiherr von Eppinghoven by his nephew, Ernest II, Duke of Saxe-Coburg and Gotha. In 1863, Claret was also created Baronin von Eppinghoven.

=== Domestic policy, politics and infrastructure ===
While the drafters of the Belgian Constitution aimed to make Belgium a constitutional monarchy, making the monarch a neutral and impartial arbiter, Leopold had managed to assign himself significant powers, such as assuming multiple ministries and taking charge of many diplomatic, administrative and military domains. From 1831 to 1846, politics in Belgium was divided between Liberal and Catholic parties, along with unionist governments. Catholicism had always been the dominant religion in Belgium, yet Leopold had always refused to convert from his Lutheran faith and favoured the Liberals. To appease to the public, he sought to maintain cordial relations with the Holy See, though Louis de Lichtervelde suggests it may have been to reassure and consolidate his own power against "the only other force" (Catholicism) which was more popular than him. Leopold also believed that the Church would act as a means of unity for Belgium, which was linguistically divided.

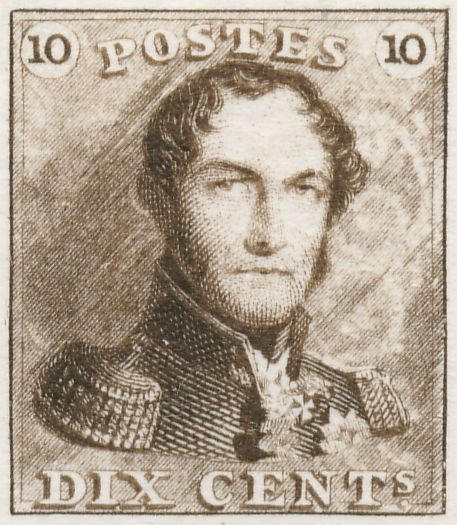
Leopold depicted on the first Belgian postage stamp, issued in 1849

Historians believe that the fall of the Theux government in April 1840 was feared by Leopold as it was it marked the first time in modern Belgian history, and under his reign, that a government had collapsed. Leopold was opposed to Lebeau forming government as his party had voted against Barthélémy de Theux de Meylandt, which caused the government's collapse. In 1846, the Party for Freedom and Progress convened to strengthen the cooperation between the executive and legislature, and as a result of new Bills passed by Charles Rogier's government, the role of the monarch was reduced and Liberals dominated politics, advocating for free trade, freedoms, liberties and secularisation. During the second half of Leopold's reign, the Liberals remained in power. While meeting with the government, Leopold made it clear that he believed the appointment and dismissal of ministers was his prerogative under the Constitution, and demanded that he be informed in advance of all government, ministerial and administrative decisions.

Throughout Leopold's reign, Belgium experienced economic and industrial progress, despite economic crises during the early decades of his reign. The period between 1845 and 1849 was particularly hard in Flanders, where harvests failed and a third of the population became dependent on poor relief, and has been described as the "worst years of Flemish history". The economic situation in Flanders also increased the internal migration to Brussels and the industrial areas of Wallonia, which continued throughout the period. Despite this, Leopold worked closely with the government to develop infrastructure, which he promised in his enthronement speech: "Multiple efforts will be directed towards the improvement and extension of agriculture, commerce and industry; they contribute to spreading prosperity among the various classes of inhabitants and to cementing harmony." In 1842, Leopold failed to pass laws to regulate child and women labour. He wanted to ban them from working in certain industries, such as harvesting in which he believed they dominated; however, the Bill he proposed was defeated, and child labour continued to be abused. For example, in 1850, the coal industry employed nearly 3300 women, 4400 boys and 1221 girls under the age of sixteen in underground labour. In agriculture, similar statistics existed with harsh working conditions and low wages. An investigation was conducted in 1853 and 1854 by Édouard Ducpétiaux found that the average Belgian worker had to devote 65.8% of their wage to basic needs. Leopold never recognised or tended to the issue of low wages.

Leopold was an early supporter of railways. Belgium's first stretch of railway, between northern Brussels and Mechelen, was completed in May 1835. It was the first steam passenger railway in Continental Europe. The development of railways allowed for the growth of the industry and in an 1847 speech, Leopold remarked: "Freight transport and railway revenues continue to increase at a remarkable rate. Measures are being prepared to increase them further and to introduce improvements in the operation of this important service." Multiple historians attribute the development and production of cast iron, steel, coal, glassworks and cloth weaving to Leopold's reign. Earlier in 1835, Leopold had inaugurated the National Bank of Belgium, which solidified the 1832 creation and circulation of the Belgian franc. Leopold appeared on coinage and postage stamps, which had helped to congeal the legitimacy of his reign in the early years.

=== Revolution of 1848 ===
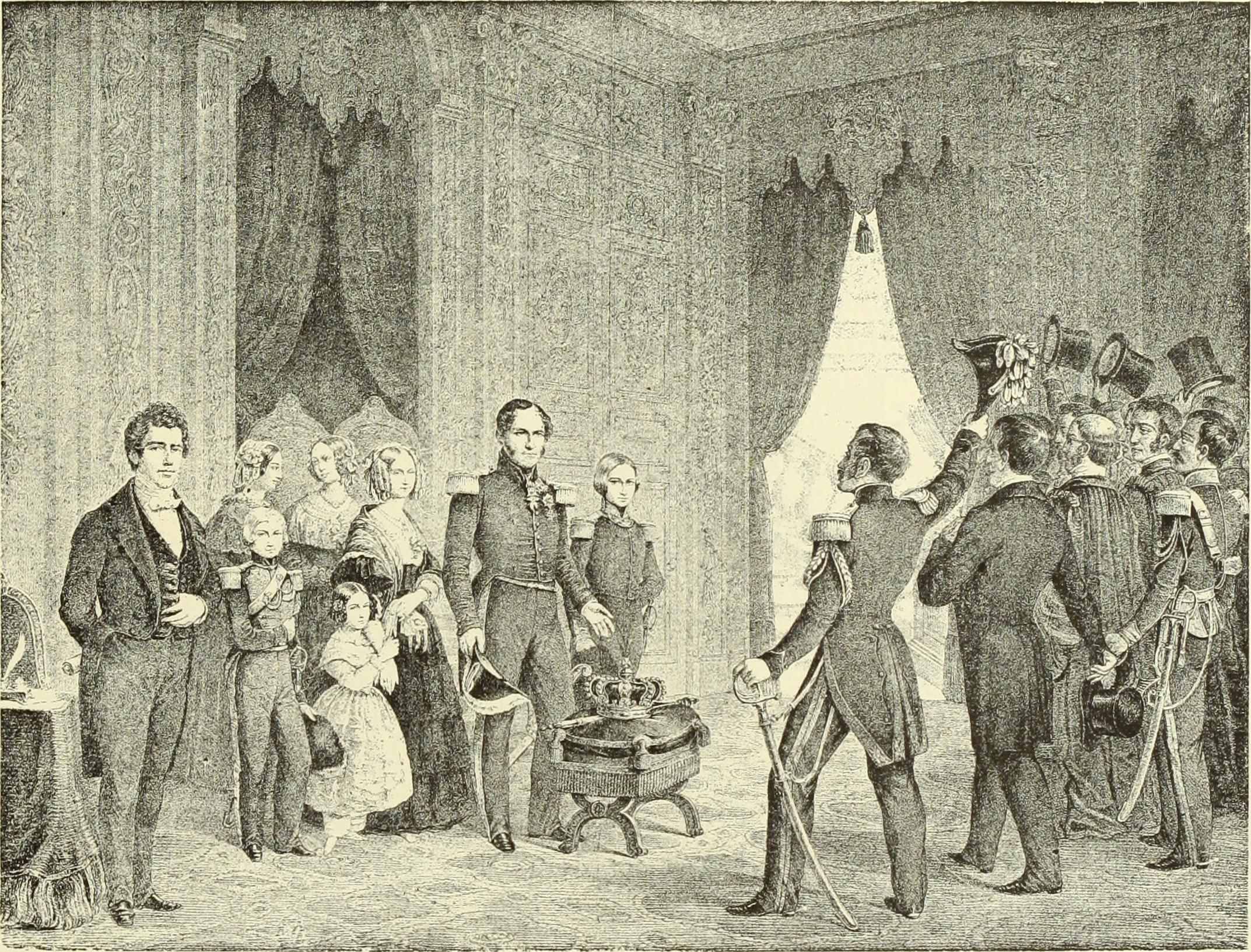
Engraving of Leopold's theatrical offer in 1848 to abdicate

In 1848, protests plagued the majority of Europe. The success of economic reforms partially mitigated the effects of the economic downturn and meant that Belgium was not as badly affected as its neighbours by the Revolutions of 1848. Nevertheless, in early 1848, a large number of radical publications appeared. The most serious threat of the 1848 revolutions in Belgium was posed by Belgian émigré groups. Shortly after the French Revolution of 1848, Belgian migrant workers living in Paris were encouraged to return to Belgium to overthrow the monarchy and establish a republic. Around 6000 armed émigrés of the "Belgian Legion" attempted to cross the Belgian frontier. The first group, travelling by train, was stopped and quickly disarmed at Quiévrain on 26 March 1848. The second group crossed the border on 29 March and headed for Brussels, and was confronted by Belgian troops at the hamlet of Risquons-Tout and, during fighting, seven émigrés were killed and most of the rest were captured.

In order to defuse tension, the government adopted multiple measures aimed at liberalising the country and preventing it from being attacked by revolutionary ideas of its neighbours. For example, the stamp duty on newspapers was abolished and agents who the state believed could serve as potential disturbances to public order, such as Karl Marx, were expelled from Belgium in March. Ultimately, Leopold theatrically offered his abdication, if this was the wish of the majority of his people. Historians such as Stengers and Éliane Gubin claim that it was the first time in his life that Leopold regretted not taking up the offer of the Greek throne. The defeat at Risquons-Tout effectively ended the revolutionary threat to Belgium, as the situation in Belgium began to recover that summer after a good harvest, and fresh elections returned a strong Liberal majority. At the end of 1848, Leopold commented on the situation: "You know this country which, I can say without false modesty, has been administered in an exemplary manner for almost 18 years. It proved itself well during the crisis and despite the terrible neighbourhood of Paris. [...] After this trial by fire, the country became very solid [...], I gained the trust of most of the Cabinets and also of the people; I intend to use it and use it to the full for the benefit of Europe."

=== Foreign policy ===
==== Role in European affairs ====
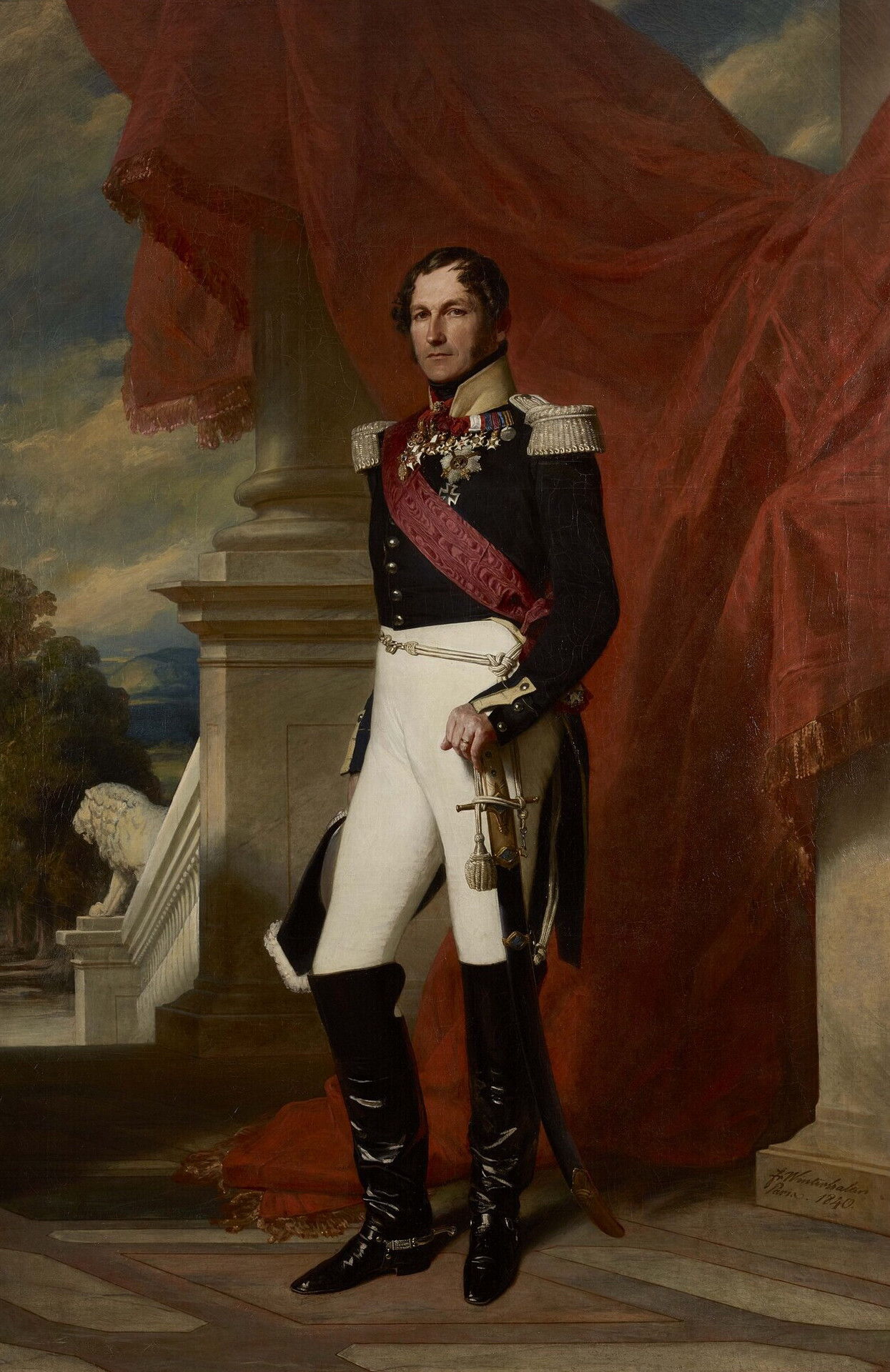
Portrait of Leopold I of Belgium by Franz Xaver Winterhalter, c. 1840

For his role in European affairs, Leopold was dubbed the "Nestor of Europe", after the wise mediator in Homer's Iliad. This was also due to his connection to other monarchs. For example, Leopold's niece was Queen of the United Kingdom, his nephew was Prince Consort of the United Kingdom and his other nephew was the Duke of Saxe-Coburg and Gotha. He remained in close contact with his sovereign relatives, particularly Queen Victoria. Historian Jean Stengers records that Leopold's intervention in European affairs was to look after Belgian interests, to look after British interests and to encourage peace to maintain the conservative order. Not only did Leopold have high-level correspondence with other leaders, but he regularly travelled and made informal and state visits. Throughout his reign and particularly in the 1840s, a main goal of his was to repair Franco-British relations due to the Eastern question. He organised a meeting between his father-in-law, Louis Philippe I of France, and his niece, Queen Victoria, in 1843 at the Château d'Eu, marking the first time in thirteen years that the House of Orléans received a foreign monarch. The following year, Louis Philippe visited Victoria in Britain, with Leopold and Louise organising his itinerary. Moreover, with the rise of Prussia to the east of Belgium, Leopold worked to maintain amicable ties with the German states. In August 1843, along with members of the British royal family, Leopold travelled to Brühl and stayed at Stolzenfels Castle with the Prussian monarch and forty members of other German royalty. Notably, the Emperor of Russia, Nicholas I, did not attend despite his invitation. In 1844, per Jules Van Praet, Russia and Belgium established relations.

The rise of Prussia as the dominating German power continued throughout the decades of Leopold's reign. The new German Confederation's legislature became the Frankfurt Assembly, which was the first pan-German parliament with representatives from each German state, including the German-speaking areas of the Austrian Empire. Leopold's name was suggested as a potential candidate for the federal leader of the Confederation who would bear the imperial crown of Germany. Naturally, the entry of Belgium into the German Confederation was then discussed. Leopold was opposed to both of these propositions as they would contravene Belgium's status as a neutral power and diminish the independence of the country. The German Confederation nonetheless soon disbanded, though German Unification would later occur after Leopold's death.

When Louis Philippe was deposed in the 1848 French Revolution, Leopold remained neutral and was one of the first heads of state to recognise the new French Republic. While this pleased the new French government, it came as a shock to other European nations who had admired Belgian neutrality, imposed by Article VII of the Treaty of London (1839). While most historians have depicted Leopold as faithful to this, others have not, such as Belgian historian Jan Anckaer, who interprets Leopold's diplomatic efforts in the Second Egyptian-Ottoman War in 1840 and Belgium's manufacture of arms for Russia during the Crimean War as breaches of neutrality. Following the July Monarchy, the Second French Empire was created, which worried the Belgian government. Immediately following the 1851 French coup d'état, Leopold sent Prime Minister Henri de Brouckère to Paris to meet the new Napoleon III to assure cordial relations. Leopold saw the new regime in France as a threat and began limiting the number of French political refugees to stay on the good side of Napoleon, whom Leopold met in Calais in 1854. The following year, Leopold sent his eldest son to Paris for an exhibition as part of the official Belgian delegation.

Furthermore, despite initial skirmishes at the start of his tenure, Leopold wanted to repair relations with the Netherlands. In October 1859, Leopold sent his youngest son to The Hague on a state visit, where he met with the Dutch royal family. On 18 October 1861 in Liège, Leopold received William III of the Netherlands, who returned via Belgium after meeting with Napoleon III. The day before the Belgian and Dutch monarchs met, Leopold wrote to Victoria: "He will be very well received, his process is rightly appreciated here. Being received in the very country where you were Crown Prince is a little painful and you feel slightly embarrassed." The meeting was successful.

==== Role in colonial affairs ====
When Leopold swore allegiance to the Constitution, Belgium had no colonial possessions and could not lay claim to any Dutch colonies. However, Belgium did seek to develop its industry and trade, which it saw would require establishing commercial relations with non-European countries. Leopold also believed that acquiring a colony would solve the issue of rising poverty rates, an effect of rapid industrialisation and food shortages following war with the Netherlands. In attempting to set up colonies, Leopold engaged in multiple planning projects which he personally funded; however, they were all abandoned by the government. He proposed taking the Isle of Pines, Tortuga and other territories in the Antilles. Sweden made Belgium an offer to cede the island of Saint Barthélemy, but France soon took it up. Other colonial prospects of Leopold's that resulted in failure included taking the Faroe Islands, setting up a Belgian protectorate in New Zealand, installing a Belgian trading post in Ethiopia, taking the Nicobar Islands per an English shipping company's suggestion, and establishing a consortium in the Philippines that would pay Spain at 5% interest.

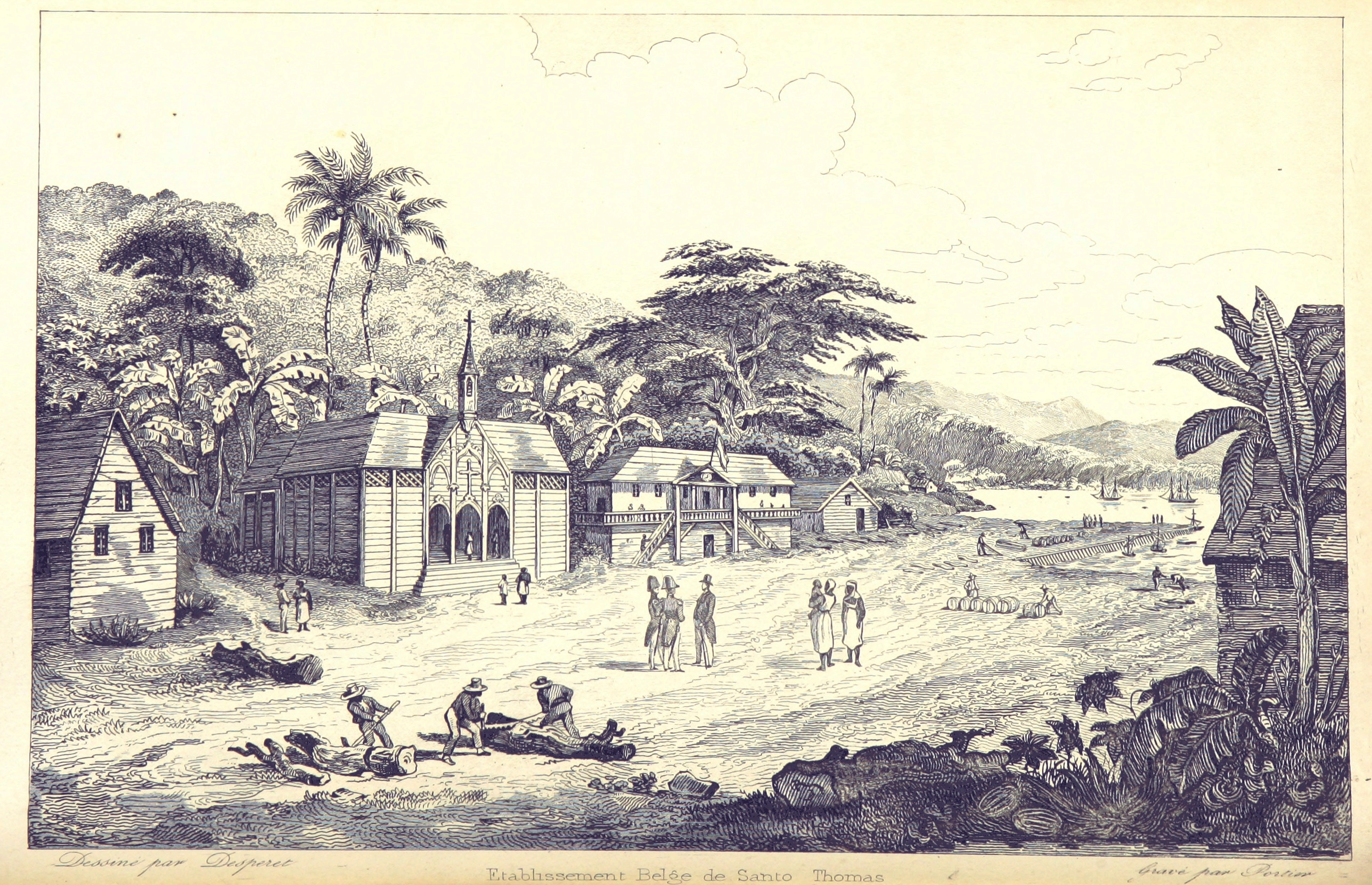
An engraving of the Belgian settlement in Santo Tomás de Castilla, c.1844

The Belgian Colonisation Company was founded on 18 September 1841 and was funded by Leopold. Its objectives were to "create agricultural, industrial and commercial establishments in different states of Central America and other places" and "to establish commercial relations between these countries and Belgium". The company purchased 404,666 hectares of land in Santo Tomás de Castilla (modern-day Guatemala) granted by the Guatemalan dictator Rafael Carrera. An exploration commission was sent on 9 November 1841 in order to finalise the purchase; however, Belgian delegates soon began leaving due to unsanitary conditions. Leopold pushed for the project to continue. Until 1847, Belgium sent ships full of settlers, served prisoners and working-class men to the territory, promising a more hopeful future; however, this failed due to harsh conditions leading to a high mortality rate. In 1855, Guatemala pulled out from the deal.

During the Second Opium War, Great Britain and France sent expeditionary forces to China, bound for Beijing in 1859. Under Leopold's eldest son, Leopold, who held an interest in the Far East, Belgium sought to involve itself by sending volunteers so that the country would economically benefit and strengthen ties with Britain and France. Leopold contacted Napoleon III, and the two agreed to Belgian involvement; however, the government stated that it would pull out if conflict were to occur. In 1860, Leopold sent his youngest son, Philip, to Brazil so that he could marry one of the daughters of Emperor Pedro II. Pedro subsequently gifted Philip with multiple territories for European migrants to settle on. Leopold was eager for the marriage to work as it would establish a branch of his family in South America. However, Philip was unimpressed and abandoned the project. By the end of Leopold's reign, Belgium still lacked colonies; however, his son would soon acquire the Congo as his own personal private property before ceding it to Belgium in 1908.

==== Role in family affairs and the death of Louise ====
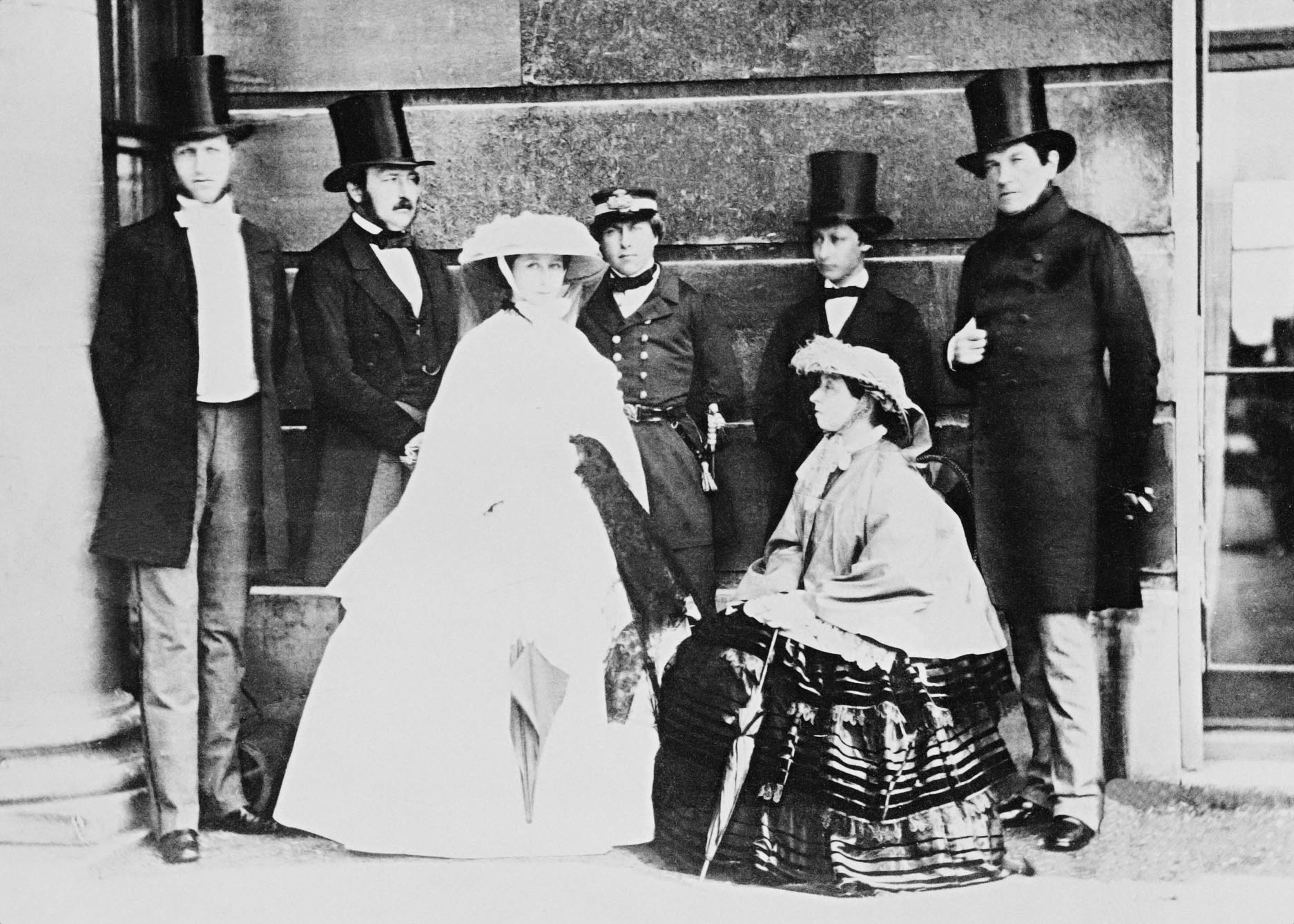
Leopold with members of his family in June 1859. (Note: Left to right: Leopold's son Prince Philippe, Leopold's nephew Prince Albert, Leopold's great-niece Princess Alice, Leopold's great-nephew Prince Luís, Leopold's niece Queen Victoria (seated), Leopold's great-nephew Prince Edward, and Leopold.)

As a member of the House of Saxe-Coburg and Gotha, Leopold was eager to see his family's influence rise throughout Europe. He skillfully used his family connections and marriages to protect Belgium from French ambitions and the threat of annexation by Napoleon III. Leopold supported the marriage of his nephew, Ferdinand, to the queen of Portugal, Maria II, in 1836. Portugal had a longstanding alliance with Great Britain and with his nephew now on the Portuguese throne jure uxoris, Leopold hoped it would bring Belgium and Britain closer. In 1840, Leopold's nephew, Albert, married his first cousin and Leopold's niece, Queen Victoria, thus cementing Anglo-Belgian ties. In 1843, Leopold's nephew, Prince August of Saxe-Coburg and Gotha, married Louise's sister, Princess Clémentine of Orléans, thus again uniting the two royal houses. Though Leopold had influenced all these royal marriages, he was not always as successful. In 1846, August's brother, Prince Leopold of Saxe-Coburg and Gotha, failed to marry Isabella II of Spain.

Meanwhile, in France in 1850, Louise had caught a cold while attending a ceremony commemorating her recently deceased father. Though medical experts did not seem concerned, Louise died prematurely on 11 October 1850, aged 38. It was the second time Leopold was widowed and he became deeply saddened by this.

For eighteen years, and more, Louise was a true friend and it is truly impossible to get an exact idea of her love and devotion. [...] It is an enormous loss, because our friendship was frankly cordial and it was never disturbed, for eighteen years, even if only for a moment.

— Leopold upon Louise's death.

Per Defrance, the mood in the royal court fell sombre dramatically after this. Leopold and Louise's children, who were barely teenagers, suffered in the absence of their mother and were often left to nannies. Louise had personally educated her children and now tutors needed to be found. Leopold became more reclusive and distanced from his family, with it becoming normal for their only form of communication to be by letter, either in French or German. Leopold found comfort in Louise's friend and his daughter's tutor, Countess Denise d'Hulst, and he attempted to father his two sons, who began regularly rebelling against him.

As his children aged, Leopold was gladdened to see his eldest son and daughter marry into the House of Habsburg-Lorraine, who served as the Emperors of Austria and previously of the Holy Roman Empire. In 1853, Leopold's eldest son married Marie Henriette of Austria, a first cousin of Emperor Franz Joseph I. Four years later, Leopold encouraged the matrimonial pairing of his daughter, Charlotte, with Archduke Maximilian of Austria, who was later appointed the Emperor of Mexico. Additionally, Leopold's great-nephew, Albert Edward, Prince of Wales (the future Edward VII), married Alexandra of Denmark in 1862 under the auspices of Leopold. Albert Edward's mother, Queen Victoria, continued Leopold's legacy of arranging royal marriages for the family, becoming nicknamed the "grandmother of Europe". However, Leopold's role in Belgian diplomacy diminished in favour of the government in the later years of his reign. In 1859, he failed to convince his Cabinet to send a Belgian brigade to support Anglo-French naval troops in China, and in 1863, he played little role in negotiations concerning the purchase of the Scheldt toll.

=== Later reign ===
==== Silver Jubilee ====
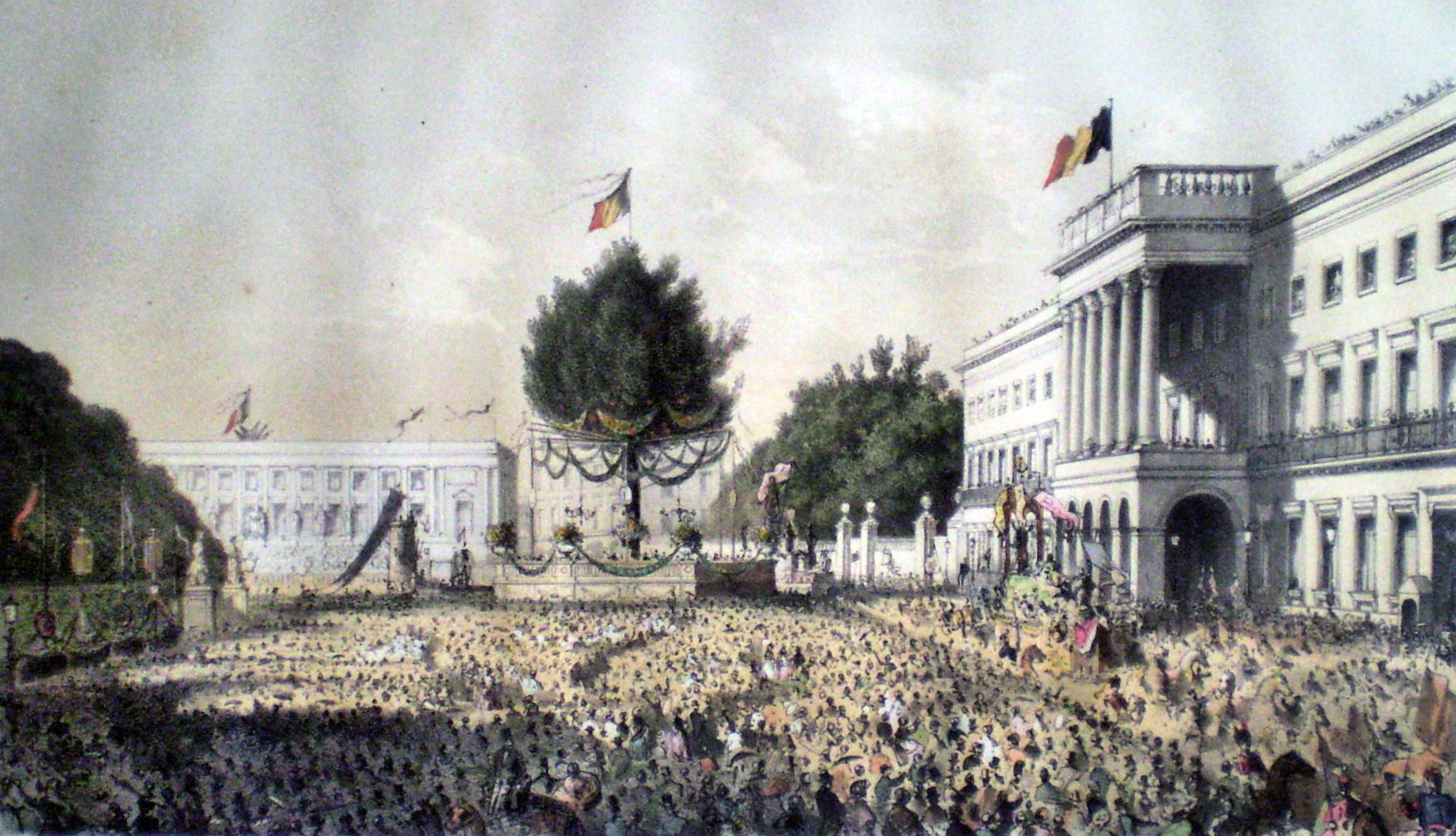
Leopold's Silver Jubilee on 22 July 1856

In Summer 1856, Leopold celebrated his Silver Jubilee, celebrating 25 years of his reign and since the inauguration of the first king of the Belgians. On 21 July 1856, Leopold travelled on horseback on the same route that he had taken when he first arrived in Belgium, through Laeken and then to the Royal Palace of Brussels. His two sons also travelled with him, and he attended a Te Deum of gratitude in his honour. While Leopold had become more reclusive as his reign continued, he was delighted with his jubilee and made many appearances. In the following months of the anniversary, Leopold and his sons visited each province of the country, where they stayed at each capital and attended processions, balls, banquets, Church services and factory tours. Stockmar, who was in retirement in Coburg, wrote in his diary his surprise of the use of the Dutch language during the tour.

The following year, Belgium faced a political crisis when Catholic Prime Minister Pierre de Decker introduced a new Bill into Parliament which he believed would act as a unifying force between the Catholics and the Liberals. The Bill was debated over 27 parliamentary sessions, as it was deemed controversial by the shadow ministry and Opposition. Protests by the public against the Bill soon broke out in the capital cities and demonstrators surrounded the Palace of the Nation. On 28 May, Leopold called in troops to calm the protests and angrily declared: "I will ride on horseback if necessary to protect the national representation; I will not allow the majority to be outraged; I will crush these scoundrels." As rioting continued, Leopold suggested that the articles in the Bill be separated, but de Decker denounced him and soon abandoned it completely. Leopold sent him a letter, which was published in the Moniteur, in which he criticised the government and wrote: "It was not I who abandoned them in 1857, it was they who abandoned me. I was ready to ride a horse, I wouldn't have backed down. They left me in the presence of disorder; they reduced me to giving in to disorder and no one could understand how profound such humiliation was."

On 9 November 1857, after de Decker resigned and the government fell, Rogier returned to office and formed a Liberal government, which lasted for ten years and went on to outlive Leopold. Rogier also held the position of Minister of the Interior, with parliamentarians Walthère Frère-Orban and Victor Tesch assuming other different ministries. This new government acted by the Constitution, but took an anticlerical attitude due to the protests. In 1861, the government introduced new legislation regarding scholarships, and took funding away from Catholic cemeteries as a punishment for the previous government who had done the same for atheist cemeteries. Leopold was strongly against these anti-religious stances taken by Rogier's Cabinet, but remained impartial per his constitutional role as a neutral figurehead, though he did threaten to override new changes if it was made clear they were not the will of the majority. However, after 1857, Leopold's main concern for Belgium was its defence and he was glad when Antwerp was chosen as the future development site of the National Redoubt.

In 1859, a statue of Leopold was erected at the top of the Congress Column to mark his earlier Silver Jubilee. On 12 June, Leopold was also delighted by the birth of his first grandson, Prince Leopold. Furthermore, in 1860, Leopold again visited each provincial capital city despite being ill and his declining health. Upon his return to Brussels in September 1860, Leopold decided to no longer preside over the Council of Ministers and to roll back on his other duties due to his aging condition. Additionally, all of Leopold's mail was now read by and responded to by Van Praet, instead of by Leopold directly.

==== Interests in the Americas ====
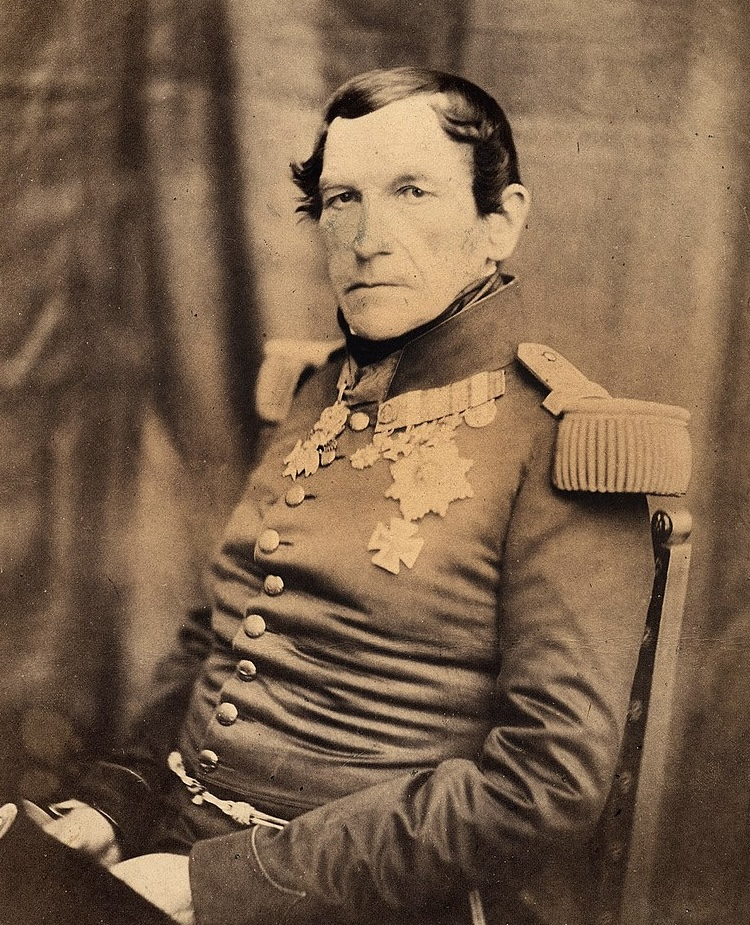
Leopold c. 1860–65

Unlike Leopold's elder son, Leopold's daughter, Charlotte, personally chose her husband of Archduke Maximilian, the younger brother of Emperor Franz Joseph I. Leopold preferred that she married his great-nephew, Peter V of Portugal, but did not oppose her decision. A few weeks after their wedding, in September 1857, Maximilian was appointed Viceroy of the Kingdom of Lombardy–Venetia. During the Austro-Sardinian War, Leopold gave unwanted strategic advice to Franz Joseph, who mocked and did not follow it. When Austria lost Lombardy, Leopold advised Prussia to assemble an army on the Rhine, which was seen as Leopold taking the Prussian side in the Austro-Prussian rivalry.

In 1861, the American Civil War broke out and despite Belgian neutrality, Leopold favoured the Confederate States due to the Union's imposition of economic blockades, including the refusal to export South American goods to Europe. According to historian Francis Balace, Leopold played an important role as a mediator between the United States and the rest of Europe, as well as in convincing other European states to back the South. In contrast, historian Jacques Portes has downplayed the significance of Leopold's role by painting him as an ineffective transmitter of correspondence between the two sides with little care for Belgium's impartiality.

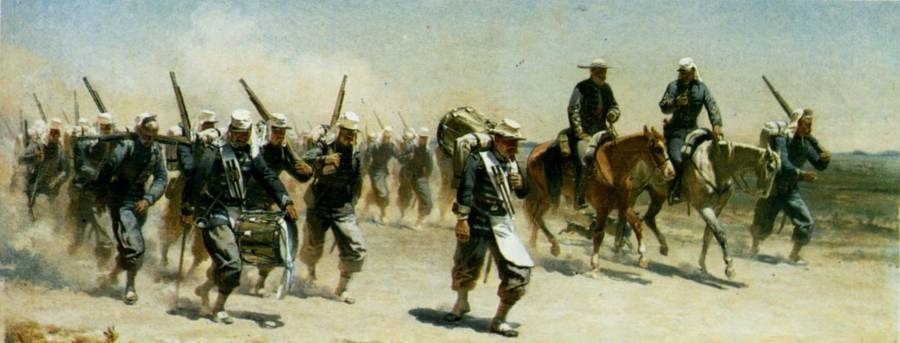
Painting of the Belgian Legion in Mexico by the artist Charles Lahalle

In Mexico, President Benito Juárez suspended the country's payment of its foreign debt in July 1861, to the displeasure of Great Britain, France and Spain. Napoleon III took it as an opportunity to intervene in Mexico, aiming to spread Catholicism and the influence of the United States in the Americas. He offered the imperial crown of Mexico to Maximilian as an apology to Austria for earlier siding with Sardinia. Much to the delight of Leopold, Maximilian accepted and left Austria with Charlotte for Mexico, arriving in Mexico City on 12 June 1864 despite armed opposition from republicans. Leopold encouraged the sending of a Belgian Legion, composed of 4000 male volunteers, to support his daughter. The Legion was badly defeated by republican forces at the Battle of Tacámbaro in April 1865, but was victorious in July under the command of Lieutenant Colonel Alfred van der Smissen. When the American Civil War ended, the United States government signalled its support for Juárez. Maximilian and Charlotte asked Leopold for some advice, but the helpless aging monarch merely replied, "God bless you, I can no longer help you." The strong Mexican resistance and failure to push back against it led to Napoleon III abandoning Mexico on 15 January 1866. Charlotte escaped Mexico in July to get assistance from European states, who ignored her and left Maximilian, who refused to abdicate and was later executed on 18 June 1867.

==== Final years ====
Until the age of 70, Leopold enjoyed relatively good health. However, in 1861, he faced several problems that severely affected him. His sister, Princess Victoria, died in March and his great-nephew, Peter V, aged 24, died of typhoid fever in November, only weeks before his brother, Infante João, Duke of Beja, also died. Additionally, his nephew, Albert, died in December. Leopold attended his funeral to support his niece, Queen Victoria, and during this time suffered from kidney stones. Leopold underwent a lithotripsy in the following March and many more in the subsequent months. Despite his health issues, Leopold was still able to engage in leisure activities, such as hunting; however, he suffered a stroke at the beginning of 1865. His health continued to decline for the remainder of the year.

== Death and funeral ==
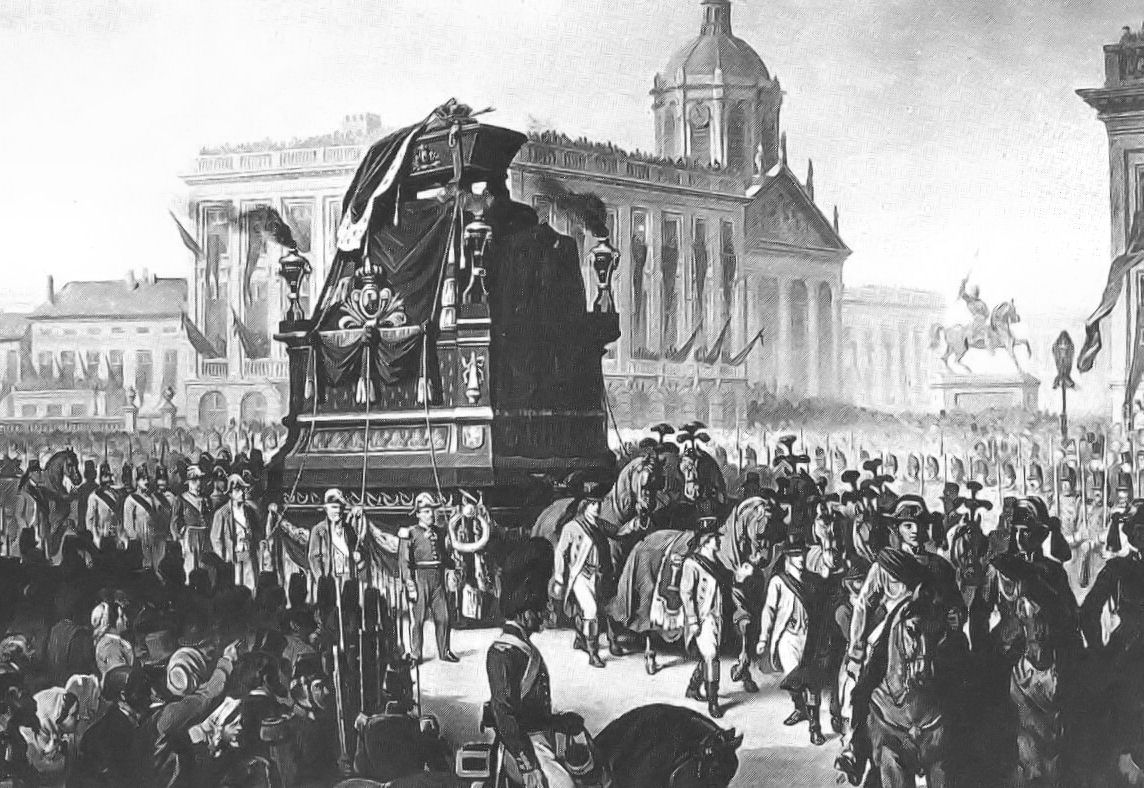
Leopold's funeral cortege in Brussels on 16 December 1865

On 23 November 1865, Leopold was urgently brought back from the Royal Château of Ardenne to Laeken due to health issues. He signed multiple royal decrees to hide his declining health, which was leaked to the public by the Moniteur on 2 December. Confined to his bed, Leopold summoned a pianist to play him the overture to Tannhäuser, as he was diagnosed with dysentery and had mobility struggles. On 9 December, Leopold was expected to die; however, he survived the night, and he was visited by his daughter-in-law, Marie Henriette of Austria, who knelt by his side and exchanged words with him. She convinced him to allow his family to visit, which they swiftly did, along with his personal chaplain, Pastor Frederick William Becker. Leopold said in their presence, "Forgive me, my God, forgive me." Holding his daughter-in-law's hand, Leopold died on 10 December 1865 at 11:45 am at the age of 74. He was succeeded by his 30-year-old son, Leopold II.

Leopold's state funeral was held on 16 December 1865, on what would have been his 75th birthday. He was initially buried next to Queen Louise in the Saint Barbara Chapel of the Notre-Dame de Laeken. On 20 April 1876, the couple's remains were moved to the Royal Crypt in the Church of Our Lady of Laeken. Over 500,000 people watched Leopold's funeral procession on 16 December 1865. Many members of European royalty were in attendance, including the Belgian royal family, Prince August of Saxe-Coburg and Gotha; Albert Edward, Prince of Wales (later Edward VII); Prince Arthur, Duke of Connaught and Strathearn; Prince George, Duke of Cambridge; Luís I of Portugal; Archduke Joseph Karl of Austria; Louis III, Grand Duke of Hesse; Leopold, Hereditary Prince of Hohenzollern; Prince Louis, Duke of Nemours; Prince Henri, Duke of Aumale; François d'Orléans, Prince of Joinville; Prince Nikolaus Wilhelm of Nassau; Frederick, Prince Royal of Prussia (later Frederick III); Prince Adalbert of Prussia; Frederick I, Grand Duke of Baden; Prince George of Saxony (later George I); and Charles I of Württemberg. Diplomats from France, Russia and the Ottoman Empire were also in attendance. Due to Leopold's Protestant faith, a Protestant version of the Church of Our Lady of Laeken was quickly built opposite Saint Barbara Chapel for the funeral. Leopold's coffin was placed in an ebony chest laced with gold, which was sealed by Tesch, the minister of justice.

== Legacy ==
=== Commemoration ===
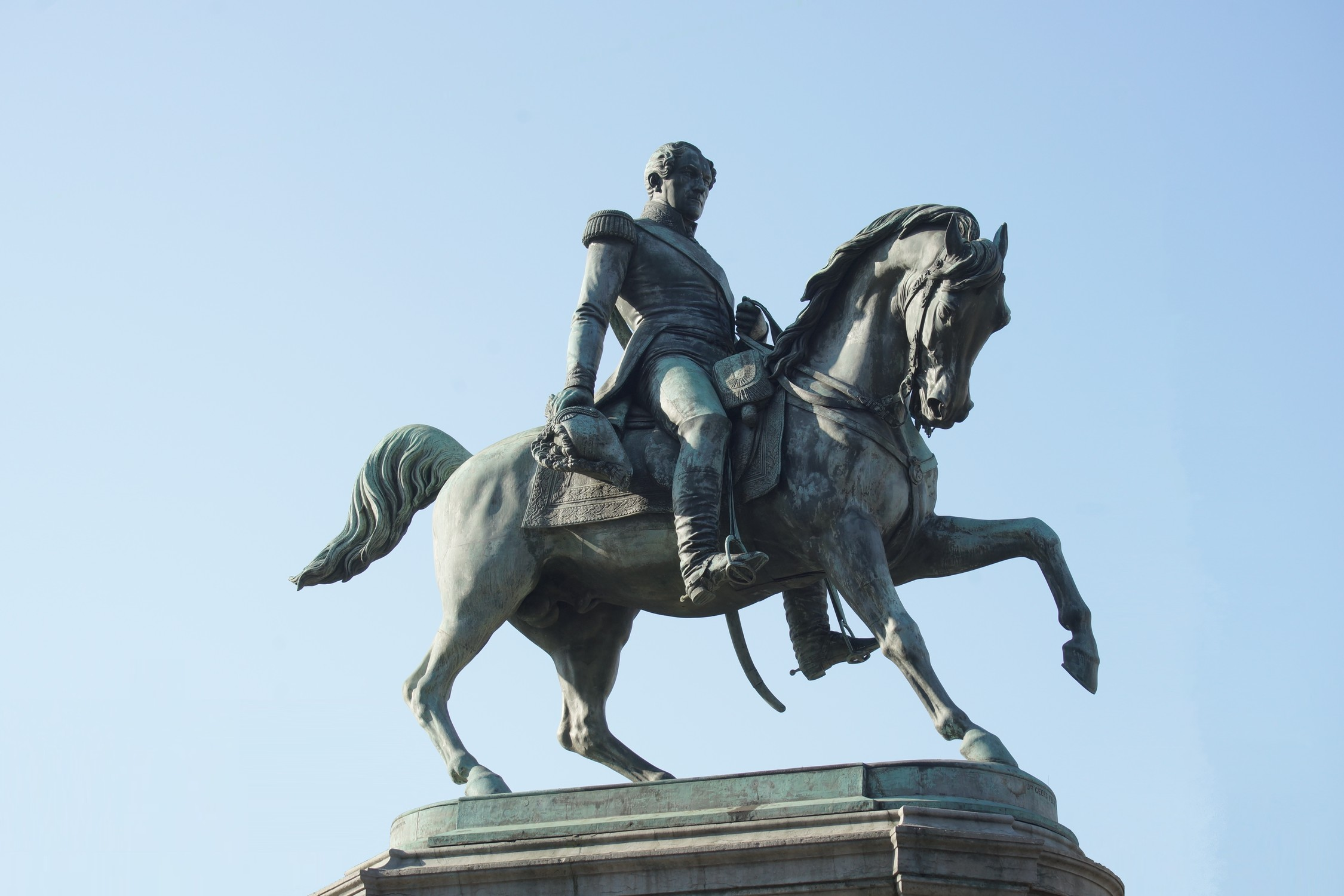
The Equestrian Statue of Leopold I in Antwerp was built in 1872

Leopold's coat of arms

Belgian National Day is celebrated annually to mark the anniversary of Leopold's pledge to the Constitution, oath and installation as King of the Belgians. Several monuments have been dedicated in Leopold's honour. The Monument to the Dynasty was erected in Brussels at the initiative of Leopold II. Other monuments built include his statue on top of the Congress Column in 1859, a monument in St George's Chapel, Windsor Castle, at the request of Queen Victoria in 1867, the Equestrian Statue of Leopold I in Leopold Square in Antwerp in 1872, the Monument to Leopold I in Mons in 1877, the Monument to Leopold I in the Park of Laeken in 1880, the Equestrian Statue of Leopold I in Ostend in 1901, and the Monument to Leopold I in La Panne in 1958. Additionally, several Belgian naval vessels have been named in his honour, including the Leopold I, a frigate acquired by Belgium in 2007. His monogram features on the flag of the Flemish town of Leopoldsburg. His likeness has also appeared on postage stamps and commemorative coins issued since his death.

=== In popular culture ===
- 1936: Played by Paul Henckels in Victoria in Dover
- 1948: Played by Jean-Pierre Aumont in The First Gentleman
- 1954: Played by Fred Liewehr in Victoria in Dover
- 2001: Played by Jonathan Pryce in Victoria & Albert
- 2010: Played by Kevin Janssens in De Troon
- 2016: Played by Alex Jennings in Victoria
- 2018: Leopold, King of the Belgians, produced by Cédric Vandresse and the Namur Production Company
- 2018: Leopold appeared in Charlotte Empress, a comic book series written by Fabien Nury and illustrated by Matthieu Bonhomme

== Honours ==
- Grand Master and Founder of the Order of Leopold, 11 July 1832
- Grand Cross of the Order of Merit of the Bavarian Crown, 1808
- Knight of the Protestant Order of Saint John of Prussia, 1810
- Commander of the Military Order of Max Joseph of Bavaria, 1812
- Knight of the Order of St. George of Russia, 9 September 1813
- Kulm Cross of Prussia, 4 December 1813
- Knight of the Order of Saint Alexander Nevsky of Russia, 21 October 1814
- Knight of the Military Order of Maria Theresa of Austria, 1814
- Grand Cross of the Royal Guelphic Order of Hanover, 22 March 1816
- Knight of the Order of the Garter of Great Britain, 23 May 1816
- Grand Cross of the Order of the Bath of Great Britain, 23 May 1816
- Knight of the Order of the Rue Crown of Saxony, 1816
- Knight of the Order of Saint Hubert of Bavaria, 1821
- Knight of the Order of the Black Eagle of Prussia, 21 September 1828
- Grand Cross of the Saxe-Ernestine House Order of Saxe-Coburg and Gotha, 25 December 1833
- 947th Knight of the Order of the Golden Fleece of Spain, 28 March 1835
- Grand Cross of the Military Order of the Tower and Sword of Portugal, 26 April 1836
- Knight of the Supreme Order of the Most Holy Annunciation of Sardinia, 30 September 1840
- Grand Cross of the Order of the Southern Cross of Brazil, February 1841
- Knight of the Order of the Zähringer Lion of Baden, 1843
- Grand Cross of the Order of the Redeemer of Greece, 1843
- Grand Cross of the House and Merit Order of Peter Frederick Louis of Oldenburg, 13 March 1844
- Grand Cross of the Order of the White Falcon of Saxe-Weimar, 1 September 1845
- Grand Cross of the House Order of the Golden Lion of Hesse-Kassel, 15 April 1846
- Grand Cross of the Order of the Elephant of Denmark, 16 June 1846
- Grand Cross of the Order of Saint Stephen of Hungary, 9 February 1849
- Knight of the Order of the Seraphim of Sweden, 30 October 1849
- Grand Cross of the Order of the Netherlands Lion, 1849
- Grand Cross of the Military Order of Christ of Portugal, 6 April 1852
- Grand Cross of the Military Order of Aviz of Portugal, 6 April 1852
- Grand Cross of the Order of Santiago of Portugal, 6 April 1852
- Knight of the Order of St. George of Hanover, 1853
- Grand Cross of the Order of the Gold Lion of the House of Nassau of Luxembourg, 1858
- Grand Cross of the Ludwig Order of Hesse, 15 October 1859
- Grand Cross of the Order of the Lion and the Sun of Persia, December 1859
- The Order of Glory of Tunisia, 22 September 1861
- First Class Decorator of the Order of the Medjidie, October 1861
- Collar of the Mexican Imperial Orders, 1 January 1865
- Grand Cross of the Order of Our Lady of Guadalupe of Mexico, 1865
- First Class Iron Cross of Prussia
- Grand Cross of the Order of the Red Eagle of Prussia
- First Class Knight of the Order of Saint Anna of Russia
- Knight of the Order of St. Andrew of Russia
- Grand Cross of the Order of Saint Joseph of Tuscany
- Knight of the Order of Saint Januarius of the Two Sicilies
- Grand Cross of the Order of Saint Ferdinand and of Merit of the Two Sicilies

== Marriages and issue ==
Leopold and his first wife, Princess Charlotte of Wales, had no surviving issue.

Leopold and his second wife, Louise of Orléans, had issue:

Name	Birth	Death	Marriage		Children
Name	Birth	Death	Date	Spouse	Children
Louis Philippe, Crown Prince of Belgium	24 July 1833	16 May 1834 (aged 9 months, 22 days)			
Leopold II of Belgium	9 April 1835	17 December 1909 (aged 74)	22 August 1853 (first marriage); 12 December 1909 (second marriage)	Marie Henriette of Austria (first marriage); Caroline Lacroix (second marriage)	From first marriage: Princess Louise; Prince Leopold, Duke of Brabant; Princess Stéphanie; Princess Clémentine; From second marriage: Lucien Philippe Marie Antoine; Philippe Henri Marie François
Prince Philippe	24 March 1837	17 November 1905 (aged 68)	25 April 1867	Princess Marie of Hohenzollern-Sigmaringen	Prince Baudouin; Princess Henriette; Princess Joséphine Marie; Princess Joséphine Caroline; Albert I of Belgium
Princess Charlotte	7 June 1840	19 January 1927 (aged 86)	27 July 1857	Maximilian I of Mexico	

Leopold and his mistress, Arcadie Claret, had illegitimate issue:

Name	Birth	Death	Marriage		Children
Name	Birth	Death	Date	Spouse	Children
George Frederick von Eppinghoven	14 November 1849	3 February 1902 (aged 54)	1897	Anna Brust	Three children; including Henry-George von Eppinghoven
Arthur Von Eppinghoven	25 September 1852	9 November 1940 (aged 88)	1887	Anna Lydia Harris	Louise-Marie von Eppinghoven

== Bibliography ==
- Aronson, Theo (1968). Defiant Dynasty: The Coburgs of Belgium. Indianapolis: Bobbs-Merrill. OCLC 405549.
- Ascherson, Neal (1999). The King Incorporated: Leopold the Second and the Congo (New ed.). London: Granta. ISBN 1862072906.
- Bilteryst, Damien (2014). Philippe comte de Flandre : Frère de Léopold II (PDF) (in French). Brussels: Éditions Racine. ISBN 978-2-87386-894-9. Archived from the original (PDF) on 27 August 2025.
- Bower, Leonard (2001) [1939]. Otho I : King of Greece, a biography (2nd ed.). Royalty Digest. ISBN 1-90515-912-9.
- Bronne, Carlo (1947). Léopold Ier et son temps (in French). Brussels: Goemaere. OCLC 4616830.
- Carson, Patricia (1974). The Fair Face of Flanders (Rev. ed.). Ghent: E.Story-Scientia. OCLC 463182600.
- Chastain, James. "Leopold I". Encyclopedia of 1848. Ohio University.
- Chastain, James. "Belgium in 1848". Encyclopedia of 1848 Revolutions. Ohio University.
- Christopoulos, Georgios A. & Bastias, Ioannis K., eds. (1975). Ιστορία του Ελληνικού Έθνους [History of the Greek Nation] (in Greek). Vol. ΙΒ: Η Ελληνική Επανάσταση (1821 - 1832) [The Greek Revolution (1821 - 1832)]. Athens: Ekdotiki Athinon. ISBN 978-960-213-108-4.
- Claessens, Henriette (2002). Leven en liefdes van Leopold I (in Belgian Dutch). Tielt: Lannoo. ISBN 978-9-02094-789-2.
- Conte Corti, Egon Caesar (1922). Leopold I. von Belgien. Sein Weltgebäude Koburger Familienmacht (in German). Vienna: Rikola Verlag.
- Defrance, Olivier (2004). Léopold Ier et le clan Cobourg (in French). Brussels: Éditions Racine. ISBN 978-2-87386-335-7.
- Defrance, Olivier (2025). Un ami fidèle : Lettres de Léopold de Saxe-Cobourg à Louise Cochelet 1811-1819 (in French). Brussels: Fondation Roi Baudouin. ISBN 978-9-051302189.
- de Lichtervelde, Louis (1929). Léopold Ier et la formation de la Belgique contemporaine (in French). Brussels: Dewit. OCLC 12762995.
- Driault, Édouard; Lhéritier, Michel (1926). Histoire diplomatique de la Grèce de 1821 à nos jours. Paris: PUF. OCLC 3937796.
- Huberty, Michel; Giraud, F. Alain; Magdelaine, F. & B (1976), L'Allemagne Dynastique (Tome I Hesse-Reuss-Saxe), Le Perreux: A. Giraud, ISBN 2-901138-01-2
- Janssens, Gustaaf; Stengers, Jean, eds. (1997). Nouveaux regards sur Léopold Ier et Léopold II : Fonds d'Archives Goffinet (in French). Brussels: Fondation Roi Baudouin. ISBN 978-2-87212-216-5.
- Kirchen, Gilbert (1998). Léopold avant Léopold Ier: La jeunesse romantique d'un Prince ambitieux (in French). Bruxelles: Le Cri. ISBN 2-87191-016-2.
- "Léopold Ier". La Monarchie Belge. Monarchie.be. Archived from the original on 23 October 2013.
- Pirenne, Henri (1948). Histoire de Belgique (in French). Vol. VII: De la Révolution de 1830 à la Guerre de 1914 (2nd ed.). Brussels: Maurice Lamertin.
- Puraye, Jean; Lang, Hans Otto (1973). Lettres de Léopold Ier à sa sœur la princesse Sophie; à son beau-frère Emmanuel, comte de Mensdorff-Pouilly; à son neveu Alphonse, comte de Mensdorff-Pouilly 1804–1864 (in French). Liège: Vaillant-Carmanne. OCLC 491030079.
- Richardson, Joanna (1961). My dearest uncle : A life of Leopold, first king of the Belgians. London: Jonathan Cape.
- Roegiers, Patrick (2007). La spectaculaire histoire des rois des Belges: roman-feuilleton (in French). Brussels: Perrin. ISBN 978-2-262-02451-2.
- Stengers, Jean (1972). "Léopold II et le patrimoine dynastique". Bulletin de la Classe des Lettres et des Sciences morales et politiques. 5e série (in French). 58. Royal Academy of Science, Letters and Fine Arts of Belgium: 63–134. doi:10.3406/barb.1972.55033. hdl:2013/ULB-DIPOT:oai:dipot.ulb.ac.be:2013/287790. ISSN 0001-4133. OCLC 1129440908.
- Stengers, Jean (2008). L'action du Roi en Belgique depuis 1831: Pouvoir et influence (in French). Brussels: Racine. ISBN 978-2-87386-567-2.
- Stengers, Jean; Gubin, Éliane (2002). Histoire du sentiment national en Belgique des origines à 1918: Le grand siècle de la nationalité belge - De 1830 à 1918 (in French). Brussels: Racine. ISBN 2-87386-249-1.
- Wei, Louis (1959). "L'origine des rapports entre la Belgique et la Chine 1842-1845". Revue belge de philologie et d'histoire (in French). 37 (2): 394–407. doi:10.3406/rbph.1959.2272. ISSN 0035-0818.
- van Win, Jean (2006). Léopold Ier, le roi franc-maçon (in French). Labor Cortext. ISBN 978-2804024581.
- Wolmar, Christian (2010). Blood, Iron & Gold: How the Railways transformed the World. London: Grove Atlantic. ISBN 9781848871717.
