= Jules Van Praet =

Belgian diplomat and personal secretary

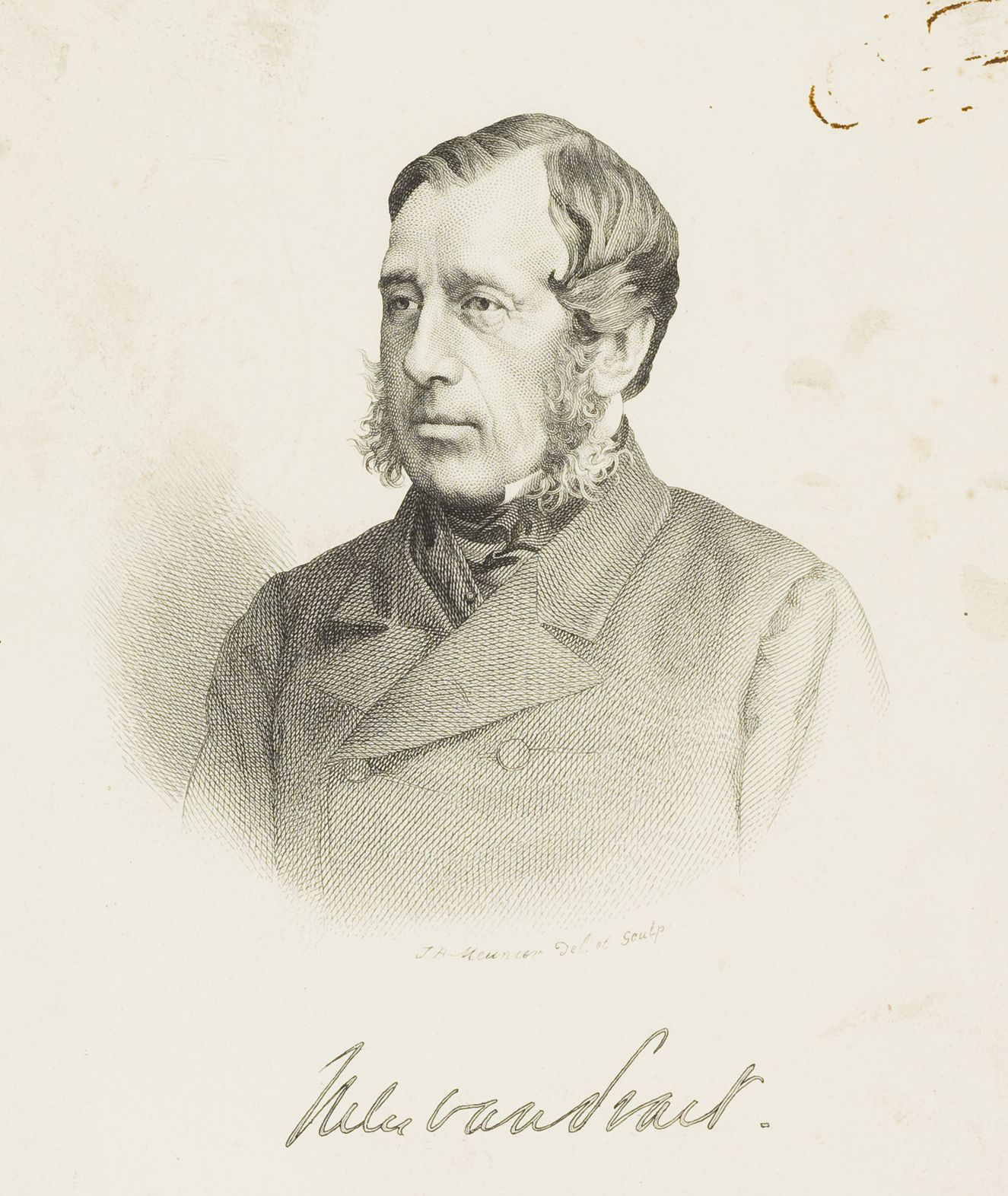
Jules Van Praet.

Jules Van Praet (2 July 1806 – 29 December 1887) was a Belgian diplomat and personal secretary of King Leopold I of Belgium. He was born in Bruges, and died in Brussels aged 81.

== Honours ==
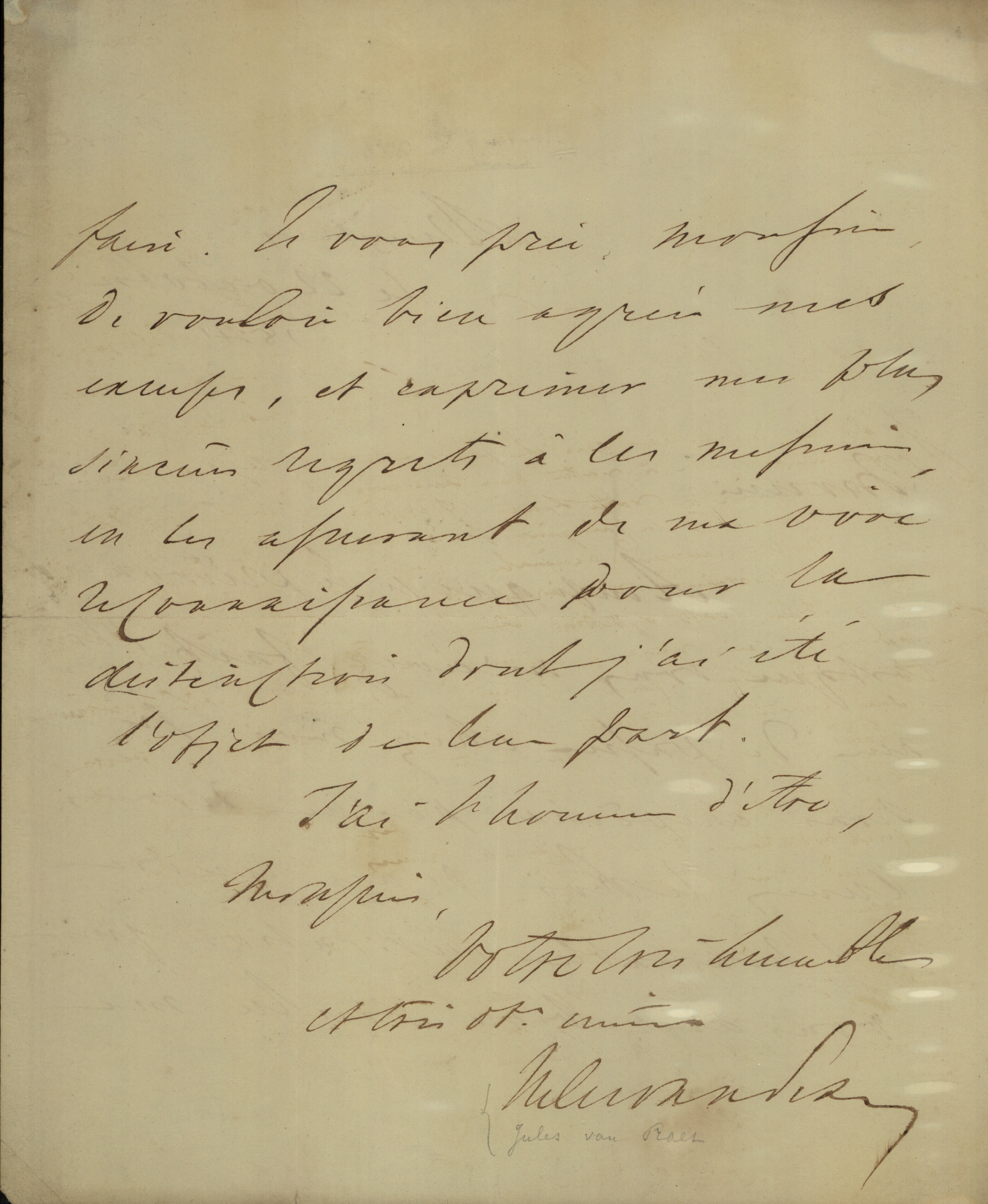
Letter by Van Praet (1841)

- 1853: Grand Cordon of the Imperial Order of Leopold
- Knight Grand Cross in the Order of the White Eagle
- Knight Grand Cross in the Order of Merit of Saxony
- Knight Grand Cross in the Order of the Zähringer Lion
- Knight Grand Cross in the Order of Saint Michael
- Knight Grand Cross in the Legion of Honour
- knight grand Cross in the Order of the Polar Star
- knight Grand Cross in the Order of Charles III
- knight Grand Cross in the Order of Saint Januarius
- knight Grand Cross in the Order of Saint Joseph
- knight Grand Cross in the Saxe-Ernestine House Order
- Commander in the Saxe-Ernestine House Order
- Commander in the Order of Saint Stephen of Hungary
- Officer in the Order of the Tower and Sword
- Order of Nichan, 2nd Class with Brilliants
