= Suzanne Tassier =

Suzanne Tassier-Charlier Professeur ordinaire
- Born: Suzanne Tassier; 4 June 1898; Antwerp, Belgium
- Died: 12 March 1956 (aged 57); Schaerbeek, Belgium
- Occupations: historian; university professor; political activist; feminist
- Known for: First Belgian woman to be awarded a higher education degree in her country
- Spouse: Gustave Charlier (m. 1934)

Academic background
- Education: Université libre de Bruxelles (ULB)
- Thesis: L'origine et l'évolution du Vonckisme (1923)
- Doctoral advisor: Frans van Kalken

Academic work
- Discipline: History
- Sub-discipline: contemporary history
- Institutions: ULB

Notes
- Chair Suzanne Tassier-Charlier at ULB

Suzanne Tassier-Charlier (4 June 1898 - 12 March 1956) was a Belgian historian, political activist, feminist, and Professeur ordinaire. She was the first Belgian woman to be awarded a higher education degree in her country.

== Biography ==
Suzanne Tassier was born in Antwerp on 4 June 1898. Her father was Major General Emile Tassier. She began her studies at the École normale de Bruxelles. World War I forced her to continue and complete her secondary education abroad, first in the Isle of Wight in the United Kingdom, then in Versailles, Yvelines, France. Back in Belgium after the war, she entered the Université libre de Bruxelles (ULB) in 1919 where she studied history. At the instigation of Frans van Kalken, she turned to contemporary history and produced a thesis entitled L'origine et l'évolution du Vonckisme, which enabled her to obtain her doctorate in 1923, after which she entered the Lycée Emile Max in Schaerbeek in July 1924.

== Career ==
From her years of study at the ULB, Tassier became a liberal political and social activist by participating as early as 1920 in the "Mouvement estudiantin pour la culture morale" (Student Movement for Moral Culture) (founded in 1919), by founding the "Cercle d'histoire et de sociologie", and by participating in the "Cercle des Étudiants libéraux". She was also active in feminist activities during these years, joining the " Fédération belge des Femmes universitaire" (Belgian Federation of University Women) (FBFU) and participating in the "Groupement belge de la Porte Ouverte" (Belgian Open Door Group) whose slogan was "Pour l'émancipation économique de la travailleuse" (For the economic emancipation of the working woman).

While working as a high school teacher, Tassier resumed her studies and, in November 1934, successfully defended her agrégation thesis on Histoire de la Belgique sous l'occupation française en 1792 et 1793 (History of Belgium under the French occupation in 1792 and 1793), which made her the first Belgian university agrégée. From then on, she was a lecturer at the ULB.

The same year, she married Gustave Charlier (1885-1959), professor of philology at the same institution.

Her feminist convictions were reinforced following a trip to the United States that she made with her husband in 1938. During this trip, Tassier discovered the Hoover Institution Library and Archives, dedicated to the study of World War I and the Russian Revolution of 1917.

In 1940 and 1941, following the eviction of professors Frans van Kalken and Michel Huisman at ULB by the Nazi occupiers, Tassier took over some of their courses. In 1945, Michel Huisman having left his position, she took over most of his teaching, as well as some other courses, and officially became a professeur ordinaire at ULB in 1948.

=== Publications ===
Tassier published numerous books and articles throughout her career. Before World War II, her three major books on the Brabant Revolution, its premises and its aftermath were published, beginning with her thesis of 1923, L'origine et l'évolution du Vonckisme. This was followed by Les démocrates belges de 1789. Étude sur le Vonckisme et la révolution brabançonne, a 1929 dissertation that was awarded and published in 1930 by the Royal Academy of Science, Letters and Fine Arts of Belgium, and then her 1934 agrégation thesis, Histoire de la Belgique sous l'occupation française en 1792 et 1793. Throughout these years and until 1939, she wrote several articles and contributions for journals and collective works, some of which were reprinted in volume in 1943 in Figures révolutionnaires (XVIIIe siècle).

While after World War II, her work was published in a number of journals and collective works, her important publications became rarer. There was another compilation work in 1944, Idées et profils du XVIIIe siècle, which reprinted articles that had appeared before the war, a reworked part of her 1934 dissertation, and the introductory lesson of her course L'esprit public en Belgique de 1725 à 1789; the same year, L'Histoire de la guerre mondiale, for a world war museum and an office of contemporary documentation; in 1951, La Belgique et l'entrée en guerre des États-Unis (1914-1917); as well as a variety of other articles and contributions up to 1954. At the end of her life, she turned her interests towards the sixteenth century and had already announced in 1951 the publication of the book Les Pays-Bas contre Philippe II: Egmont, a work that her premature death did not allow her to realize.

== Death and legacy ==
During the 1950s, Tassier's health deteriorated, and she died on 12 March 1956 in Schaerbeek, at the age of 58. Her legacy is honored by the Suzanne Tassier-Charlier Chair at ULB, since 1963.

== Selected works ==
- Les démocrates belges de 1789 : Étude sur le Vonckisme et la révolution brabançonne, 1929
- Histoire de la Belgique sous l'occupation franc̜aise en 1792 et 1793, 1934
- Un grand centre historique américain : la Hoover Library, 1940
- Figures révolutionnaíres, XVIII siècle, 1942
- Idées et profils du XVIIIe siècle, 1944
- L'histoire de la guerre mondiale : pour un Musée de la guerre mondiale et un Office de documentation contemporaine, 1944
- La technique des révolutions nationales et le duel Cornet de Grez - Verlooy : une cause inconnue de la première coalition, 1947
- La Belgique et l'entrée en guerre des États-Unis, 1914-1917, 1950
- Figures révolutionnaíres, XVIII siècle, 1954
- Aux origines de la Première coalition : le ministre Le Brun Tondu : par Suzanne Tassier, 1954
- La Jeunesse de l'historien Michel Huisman, par Suzanne Tassier, 1954
