= 1831 in Belgium =

- Decades: 1830s; 1840s; 1850s
- See also: Other events of 1831; List of years in Belgium

Events in the year 1831 in Belgium.

== Incumbents ==
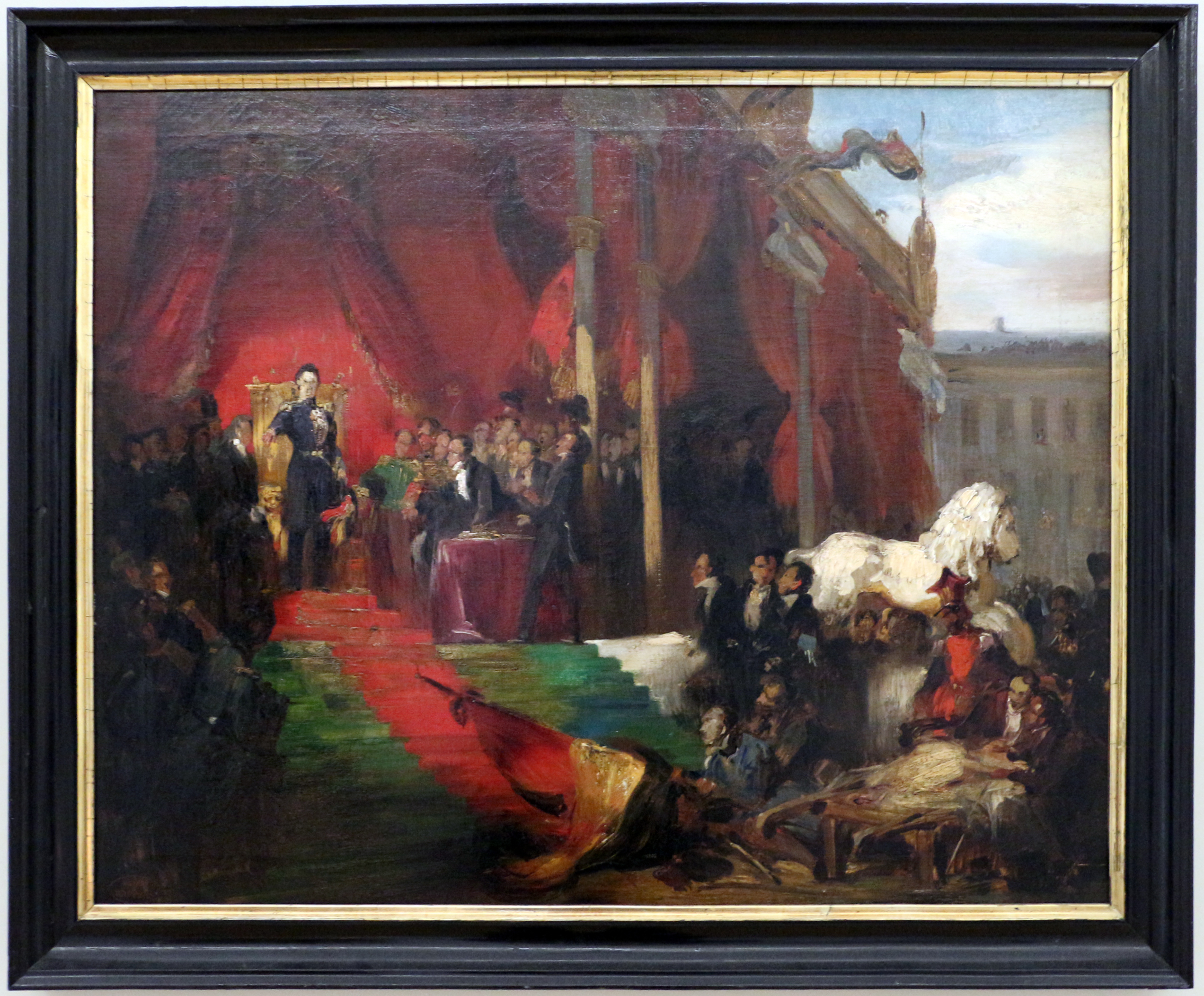
Gustave Wappers, The Swearing in of Leopold I

Monarch – Leopold I (from 21 July)
Head of government – Etienne Constantin de Gerlache (27 February–10 March), Joseph Lebeau (10 March–24 July), Félix de Muelenaere (from 24 July)

== Events ==
February

- 3 February – Prince Louis, Duke of Nemours, elected king of the Belgians but declined the honour.
- 5 February – Jan van Speyk explodes his gunboat in the port of Antwerp
- 7 February – National Congress approves the Constitution of Belgium
- 27 February – Etienne Constantin de Gerlache takes office as head of government

March

- 10 March – Joseph Lebeau replaces Etienne Constantin de Gerlache as head of government

June

- 26 June – At the Conference of London the five great powers (Austria, Britain, France, Prussia, Russia) finalise the Treaty of the Eighteen Articles, an unsuccessful peace proposal for Belgium and the Netherlands

July

- 12 July – Leopold, Prince of Coburg, elected king of the Belgians.
- 19 July – Leopold arrives in Brussels.
- 21 July – Leopold sworn in as King of the Belgians.
- 24 July – Félix de Muelenaere replaces Joseph Lebeau as head of government

August

- 2–12 August – Ten Days' Campaign – Dutch attempt to re-establish rule over Belgium fails, but Dutch forces retain control of Antwerp Citadel.
  - 8 August – Battle of Hasselt
  - 12 August – Battle of Leuven
- 29 August – Belgian general election, 1831, first elections for the Belgian Parliament

== Publications ==
- Almanach de poche de Bruxelles (Brussels, M.-E. Rampelbergh)
- Joseph Jean De Smet, Nouvelle géographie, second edition (Ghent, Vanryckgem-Hovaere)
- Auguste Voisin, Guide des voyageurs dans la ville de Gand, ou Notice historique sur cette ville, ses monumens, ses institutions, sa statistique, etc. (Ghent, Louis De Busscher)

== Births ==
- 3 March – Clémentine Louant, writer (died 1915)
- 11 April – Euphrosine Beernaert, landscape painter (died 1901)
- 12 April – Constantin Meunier, painter and sculptor (died 1905)
- 25 April – Edmond Reusens, archaeologist (died 1903)
- 30 May – Louis Roersch, philologist (died 1891)
- 8 July – Antoine-Félix Bouré, monumental sculptor (died 1883)
- 29 July – Léopold Harzé, sculptor (died 1893)
- 26 September – François-Joseph Scohy, archaeologist (died 1881)
- 30 September – Joseph Delboeuf, psychologist (died 1896)

== Deaths ==
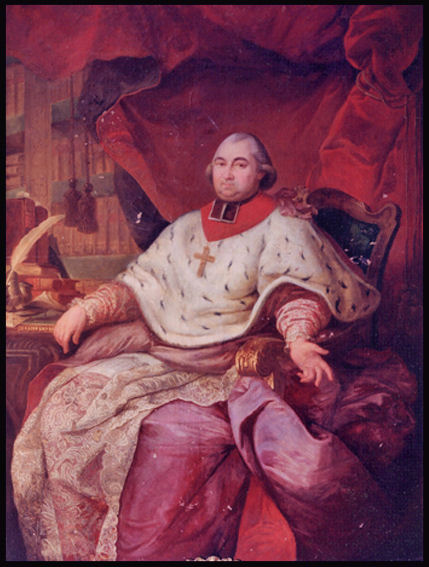
François de Méan

- 15 January – François de Méan (born 1756), archbishop of Mechelen
- 27 March – Jean Kickx (born 1775), botanist and mineralogist
- 5 April – Pierre Léonard Vander Linden (born 1797), entomologist
- 21 November – Marie Anne Simonis (born 1758), industrialist
