= 1837 in Belgium =

- Decades: 1830s; 1840s; 1850s
- See also: Other events of 1837; List of years in Belgium

Events in the year 1837 in Belgium.

== Incumbents ==
- Monarch: Leopold I
- Prime Minister: Barthélémy de Theux de Meylandt

== Events ==
- 21 March – Flooding in Burcht and Stabroek.
- 13 June – Parliamentary elections
- 19 June – Charles van Hulthem's book collection bought by the state; the core of the collection of the Royal Library of Belgium.
- 21 August – Victor Hugo travels by train for the first time while visiting Belgium.
- 4 October – Société Civile pour l'Agrandissement et l'Embellissement de Bruxelles established, to develop the Leopold Quarter in Brussels.
- 12 November – Parliament approves 10 million franc government loan to build railways.
- 28 December – Pastoral letter of Belgian bishops deprecates Catholic membership of masonic lodges.

== Publications ==
Periodicals

- Almanach de poche de Bruxelles (Brussels, M.-E. Rampelbergh)
- Annuaire du clergé catholique du royaume de Belgique (Brussels, Veuve J.-J. Vanderborght)
- Journal historique et littéraire, vol. 4 (Liège, P. Kersten).
- Messager des sciences et des arts de la Belgique, vol. 5 (Ghent, Léonard Hebbelynck)
- Revue de Bruxelles begins publication

Reference works

- Pasinomie, ou Collection complète des lois, décrets, arrêtés et règlements généraux qui peuvent être invoqués en Belgique
- Dictionnaire des hommes de lettres, des savans et des artistes de la Belgique (Brussels, Établissement Géographique)

Non-fiction

- Joseph Jean De Smet (ed.), Recueil des chroniques de Flandre, vol. 1.
- Johann Wilhelm Löbell, Lettres sur la Belgique (Brussels)
- Félix Victor Goethals, Lectures relatives à l'histoire des sciences, des arts, des lettres, des moeurs, et de la politique en Belgique, et dans les pays limitrophes, vol. 1 (Brussels, Imprimerie de Vandooren for the author).

Fiction

- Jules de Saint-Genois, La cour du duc Jean IV, chronique brabançonne, 1418-1421

== Births ==
- 26 February – Charles Woeste, politician (died 1922)
- 24 March – Prince Philippe, Count of Flanders (died 1905)
- 18 May – Victor Joseph Doutreloux, bishop of Liège (died 1901)
- 14 June – Frans Jozef Peter van den Branden, writer (died 1922)
- 5 December – Camille Janssen, colonial governor (died 1926)
- 27 December – Émile de Borchgrave, diplomat (died 1917)

== Deaths ==
- 27 February – Françoise-Jeanne Ridderbosch (born 1754), artist
- 17 April – Édouard de Walckiers (born 1758), banker
- 8 May – James Cockerill (born 1787), industrialist
- 17 August – Charles Felix Van Quickenborne (born 1788), founder of Saint Louis University.
