= 1834 in Belgium =

- Decades: 1830s; 1840s; 1850s
- See also: Other events of 1834; List of years in Belgium

Events in the year 1834 in Belgium.

== Incumbents ==
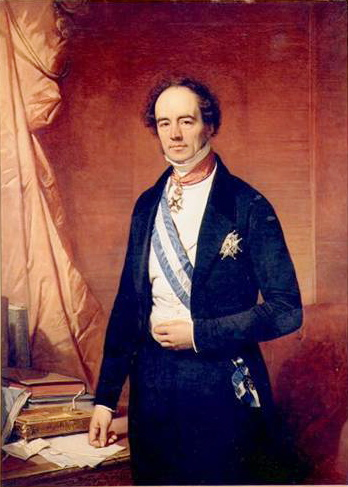
Barthélémy de Theux de Meylandt, Prime Minister 1834-1840, 1846-1847, 1871-1874

- Monarch: Leopold I
- Prime Minister: Albert Joseph Goblet d'Alviella (to 4 August), Barthélémy de Theux de Meylandt (from 4 August)

== Events ==
- 1 May – Belgian State Railways established.
- 25 May – Convention between Belgium and Denmark on rights to inherit and acquire property comes into effect.
- 27 May – Diocese of Bruges re-established, with Franciscus Renatus Boussen as bishop
- 1 June – Work begins on first Belgian railway line.
- 10 June – Belgian bishops announce plans to establish a Catholic University (later to become Catholic University of Leuven).
- 25 June – Masonic lodge Les Amis Philanthropes announces plans to establish a secularist university (to become the Université libre de Bruxelles).
- 22 July – Commission royale d'Histoire founded.
- 22 September – Treaty of amity, commerce and navigation with the Empire of Brazil signed in Rio de Janeiro.
- 1 November – Postal convention with the United Kingdom of Great Britain and Ireland comes into effect.
- 8 November – Opening of the Catholic University of Belgium in Mechelen.
- 20 November – Opening of the Université Libre de Belgique in Brussels.
- 17 December – Declarations of reciprocity with the Kingdom of Prussia regarding the inheriting and acquiring of property.
- 29 December – Extradition treaty with the Kingdom of France comes into force.

== Publications ==
- Adolphe Bartels, Les Flandres, et la révolution belge (Brussels, J. de Wallens)
- Charles de Brouckère and F. Tielemans, Répertoire de l'administration et du droit administratif de la Belgique, Vols. 1-2 (Brussels, Weissenbruch)
- Maria Doolaeghe, Nederduitsche letteroefeningen
- Zoé de Gamond, De la condition sociale des femmes aux dix-neuvième siècle (Brussels, Berthot)
- A. X. Mauvy, Le Promeneur dans Bruxelles et ses environs (Brussels, Adolphe Wahlen)
- Frances Trollope, Belgium and Western Germany in 1833 (2 vols., Paris, 1834)
- Coralie van den Cruyce, Les orphelins de la grande armée (Brussels)

Periodicals

- Journal historique et littéraire begins publication in Liège, owned and edited by Pierre Kersten.
- Pasinomie: collection complète des lois, décrets, arrêtés et réglements généraux qui peuvent être invoqués en Belgique.

== Births ==
- 4 January – Frans de Potter, founder of the Davidsfonds (died 1904)
- 9 January – Jan Verhas, painter (died 1896)
- 3 June – Camille van Camp, painter (died 1891)
- 21 June – Frans de Cort, poet and translator (died 1878)
- 17 August – Peter Benoit, composer (died 1901)

== Deaths ==
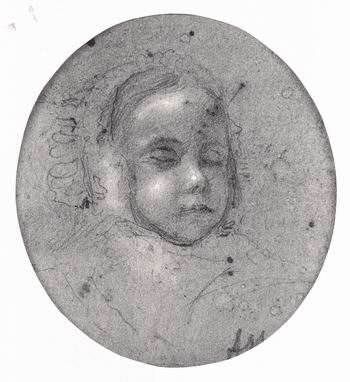
Crown Prince Louis-Philippe

- date uncertain – Marie de Latour (born 1750), painter
- 16 May – Louis-Philippe, Crown Prince of Belgium (born 1833)
- 27 July – Jean Joseph Delplancq (born 1767), bishop of Tournai
