= 1830 in Belgium =

- Decades: 1830s; 1840s; 1850s
- See also: Other events of 1830; List of years in Belgium

Events in the year 1830 in Belgium.

== Incumbents ==
Monarch: William I of the Netherlands (to 4 October)

== Events ==
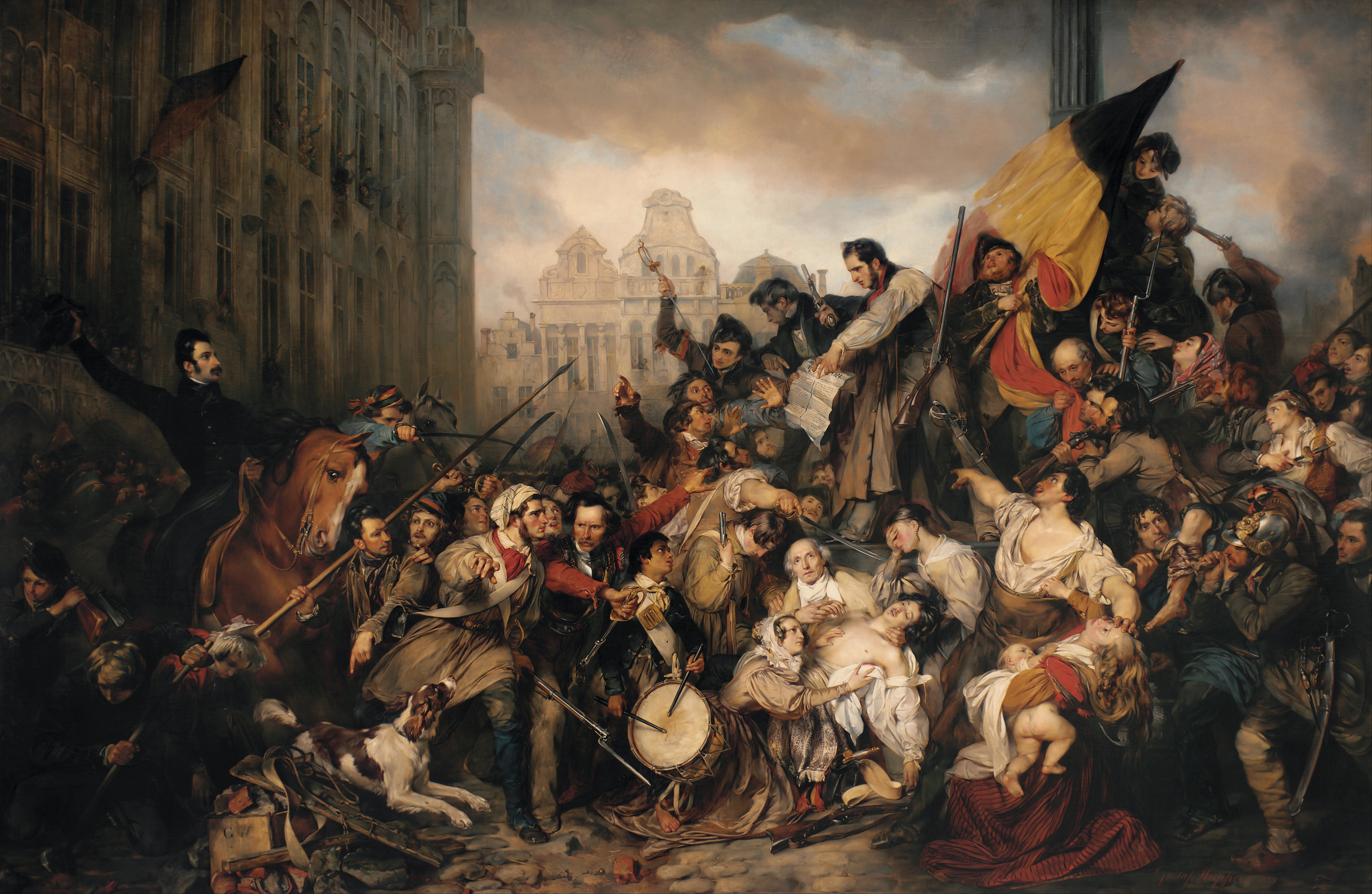
Gustave Wappers Episode of the September Days 1830 (1835)

August

- 25 August – Belgian Revolution begins

September

- 24 September – Provisional Government of Belgium formed

October

- October – Garde Civique formed to maintain public order
- 4 October – Provisional government proclaims Belgian independence.
- 17 October – Decree of the provisional government prohibiting importation of jenever from the Netherlands.
- 27 October – Belgian forces take Antwerp; Dutch forces bombard the city from Antwerp Citadel.

November

- 3 November – Elections for the National Congress of Belgium held.
- 10 November – First session of the National Congress of Belgium.
- 25 November – Étienne-Modeste Glorieux founds the fraternity in Ronse that would eventually become the Brothers of Our Lady of Lourdes

December

- 26 December – The five powers represented in the London Conference (Austria, Britain, France, Prussia, Russia) recognise Belgian independence.

== Publications ==
- Promenades dans Bruxelles et ses environs (Brussels, Berthot)
- Vade Mecum, ou description de Bruxelles et ses environs (Brussels, C. J. De Mat)

Periodicals

- Almanach du commerce du royaume des Pays-Bas: Bruxelles et ses environs (Brussels, Grignon)
- Newspaper Le Catholique des Pays-Bas changes name to Journal des Flandres on 3 October 1830.

== Births ==
- 13 April – Ferdinand Pauwels, painter (died 1904)
- 25 April – Julius de Geyter, writer (died 1905)
- 1 May – Guido Gezelle, poet (died 1899)
- 28 May – Prosper de Haulleville, newspaperman (died 1898)

== Deaths ==
- 26 February – Joseph Denis Odevaere (born 1775), painter
- 4 November – Frédéric de Merode (born 1798), revolutionary
- 17 November – Petrus Johannes van Regemorter (born 1755), painter
- 27 November – André Parmentier (born 1780), landscape architect
