= 1832 in Belgium =

- Decades: 1830s; 1840s; 1850s
- See also: Other events of 1832; List of years in Belgium

Events in the year 1832 in Belgium.

== Incumbents ==
Monarch: Leopold I
Head of government: Félix de Muelenaere (to 20 October); Albert Joseph Goblet d'Alviella (from 20 October)

== Events ==
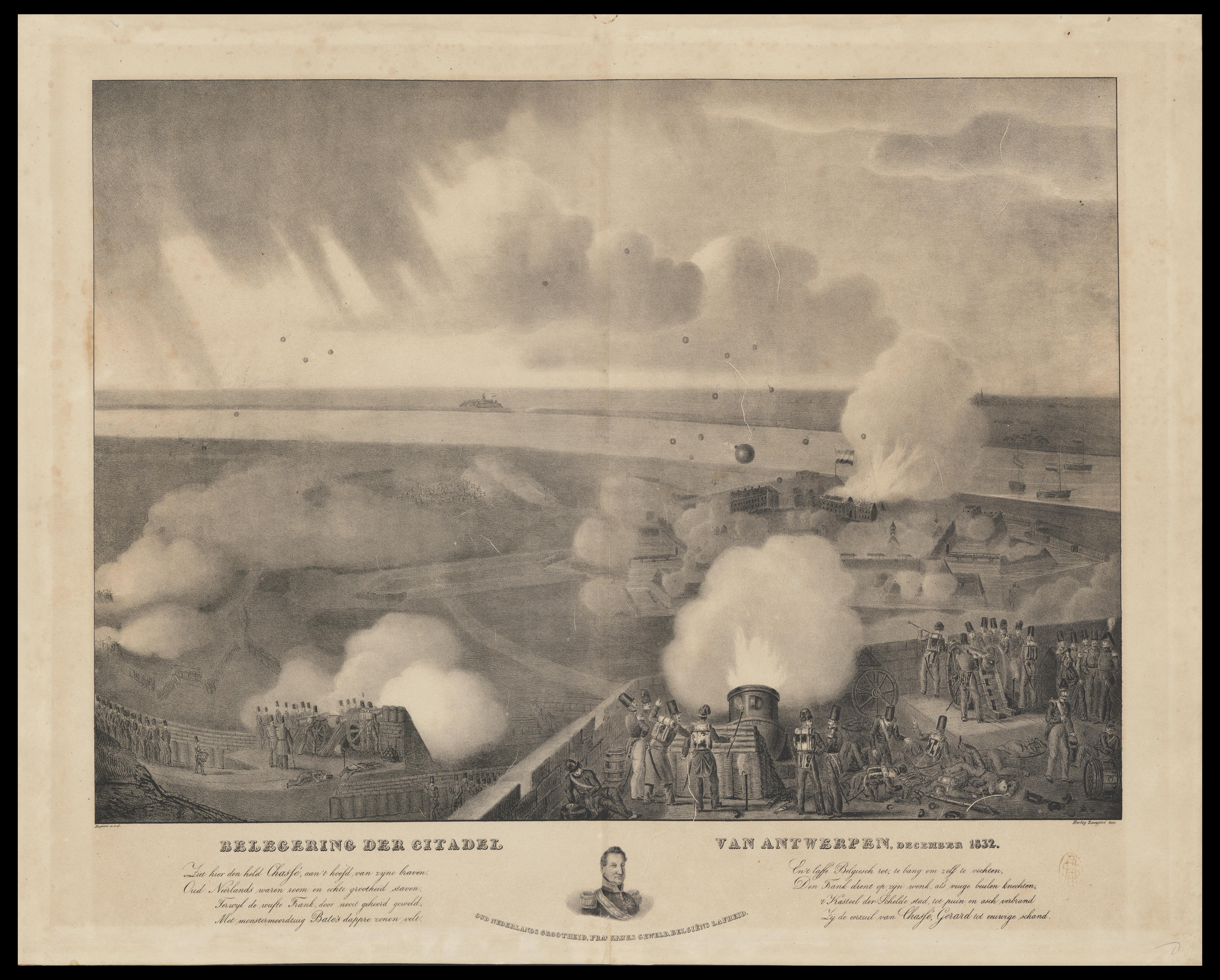
Siege of Antwerp, 1832

- 8 April – Engelbert Sterckx consecrated as Archbishop of Mechelen
- 11 July
  - Order of Leopold established.
  - Provisional postal convention between Belgium and the Office of the Prince of Tour and Taxis signed in Frankfurt am Main.
- 9 August – Leopold I of Belgium marries Louise of Orléans.
- 20 October – Albert Joseph Goblet d'Alviella replaces Félix de Muelenaere as Prime Minister
- 15 November to 23 December – Siege of Antwerp: Belgian army with French support invests Antwerp Citadel, held by Dutch forces.
- 23 December – Siege of Antwerp concludes: Dutch forces removed from Antwerp Citadel.

== Publications ==
- Almanach de poche de Bruxelles (Brussels, M.-E. Rampelbergh)
- Annuaire industriel et administratif de la Belgique par province: Province du Brabant (Brussels)

== Art and architecture ==
Paintings

- Joseph De Cauwer, Prometheus Delivered by Hercules (now in the Museum of Fine Arts, Ghent)

== Births ==
- Date uncertain – Oswald Orth, philologist (died 1920)
- 2 February – Gédéon Bordiau, architect (died 1904)
- 8 March – William Henry James Weale, art historian (died 1917)
- 24 March – Edouard Osy de Zegwaart, politician (died 1900)
- 21 August – Charles-Joseph de Harlez de Deulin, Orientalist (died 1899)
- 11 November – Paul Goethals, Archbishop of Calcutta (died 1901)
- 10 December – Antoon Stillemans, bishop of Ghent (died 1916)
- 13 December – Polydore de Keyser, Lord Mayor of London (died 1898)

== Deaths ==
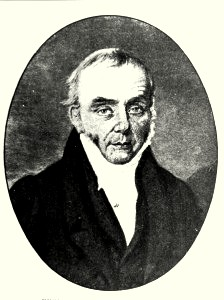
William Cockerill

- Date uncertain – William Cockerill (born 1757/9), industrialist
- 16 December – Charles van Hulthem (born 1764), politician and bibliophile
