= 1836 in Belgium =

- Decades: 1830s; 1840s; 1850s
- See also: Other events of 1836; List of years in Belgium

Events in the year 1836 in Belgium.

== Incumbents ==
- Monarch: Leopold I
- Prime Minister: Barthélémy de Theux de Meylandt

== Events ==
- 15 March – Annual general meeting of the Banque de Belgique, founded the previous year.
- 30 March – Law on municipalities of Belgium passed: mayors and aldermen to be appointed by the crown from among those elected to the local council; crown cannot disband local councils.
- 30 April – Law on provinces of Belgium passes: provincial governors appointed by the crown; crown cannot disband provincial councils.
- 2 May – Parliament empowers government to raise 6 million francs for road-building.
- 27 May – Postal convention with the Kingdom of France signed in Brussels (to enter into force 29 June).
- 18 June – Belgium adopts metric system.
- 29 September - Provincial elections
- 31 October – Provincial Council of Hainaut approves the foundation of the École des Mines de Mons.
- 4 November – Jan Frans Willems and Jean-Baptist David found Flemish literary society Maetschappij tot Bevordering der Vlaemsche Tael en Letterkunde.

== Publications ==
Periodicals

- Almanach de poche de Bruxelles (Brussels, M.-E. Rampelbergh)
- Bulletins de l'Académie royale des sciences, des lettres et des beaux-arts de Belgique, vol. 3 (Brussels, M. Hayez)
- Journal historique et littéraire, vol. 3 (Liège, P. Kersten).
- Messager des sciences et des arts, vol. 4 (Ghent, Léonard Hebbelynck)

Monographs and reports

- Pasinomie: collection complète des lois, décrets, arrêtés et réglements généraux qui peuvent être invoqués en Belgique
- L. Alvin, Compte-rendu du salon d'exposition de Bruxelles, 1836 (Brussels, J. P. Meline)
- Charles de Brouckère and F. Tielemans, Répertoire de l'administration et du droit administratif de la Belgique, Vol. 3 (Brussels, Weissenbruch)
- Zoé de Gamond, Des devoirs des femmes et des moyens les plus propres d'assurer leur bonheur (Brussels, L. Hauman)
- Joseph Jean De Smet, Coup-d'oeil sur l'histoire ecclésiastique dans les premières années du XIXe siècle (Ghent)
- Guillaume Tell Poussin, Chemins de fer américains (Brussels, Th. Lejeune)

== Art and architecture ==
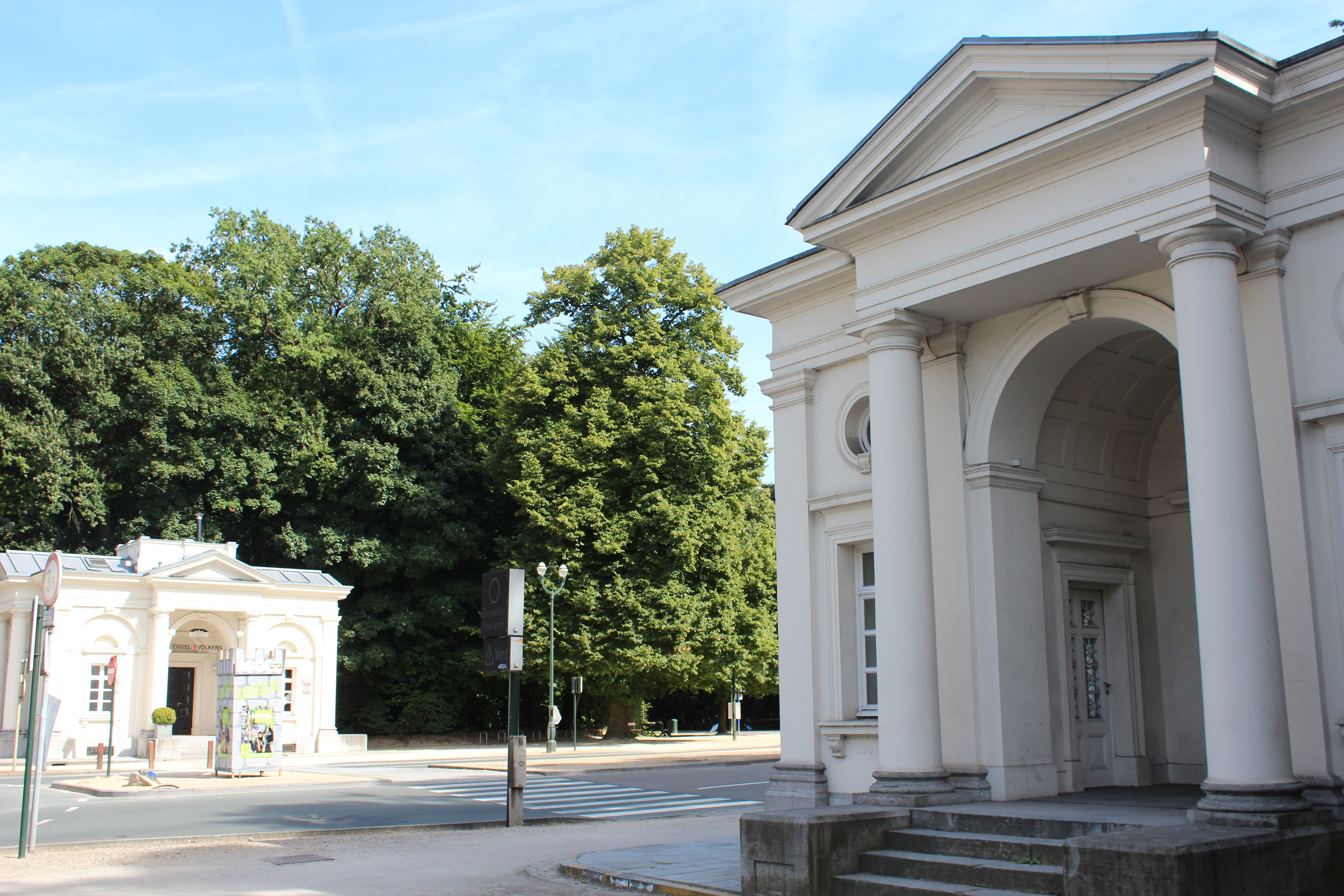
Tollbooths at the Porte de Namur, Brussels (built 1834–1836)

Paintings

- Antoine Wiertz, The Greeks and the Trojans Fighting over the Body of Patroclus

Buildings

- Auguste Payen, Porte de Namur tollbooths, Brussels

== Births ==
- 3 March – Léonie de Waha, feminist (died 1926)
- 29 March – Léon d'Andrimont, politician (died 1905)
- 17 May – Virginie Loveling, author and poet (died 1923)
- 9 June – Guillaume Vogels, painter (died 1896)
- 12 June – Bernardine Hamaekers, soprano (died 1912)
- 9 July – Camille of Renesse-Breidbach, entrepreneur (died 1904)
- 23 August – Marie Henriette of Austria, Queen of the Belgians (died 1902)
- 10 November – Julius Vuylsteke, poet-politician (died 1903)
- 15 December – Edmond Picard, jurist (died 1924)

== Deaths ==
- 27 October – Joséphine-Rosalie de Walckiers (born 1765), composer
- 7 November – Philippe-Charles Schmerling (born 1791), palaeontologist
