= 1833 in Belgium =

- Decades: 1830s; 1840s; 1850s
- See also: Other events of 1833; List of years in Belgium

Events in the year 1833 in Belgium.

== Incumbents ==
- Monarch: Leopold I
- Prime Minister: Albert Joseph Goblet d'Alviella

== Events ==
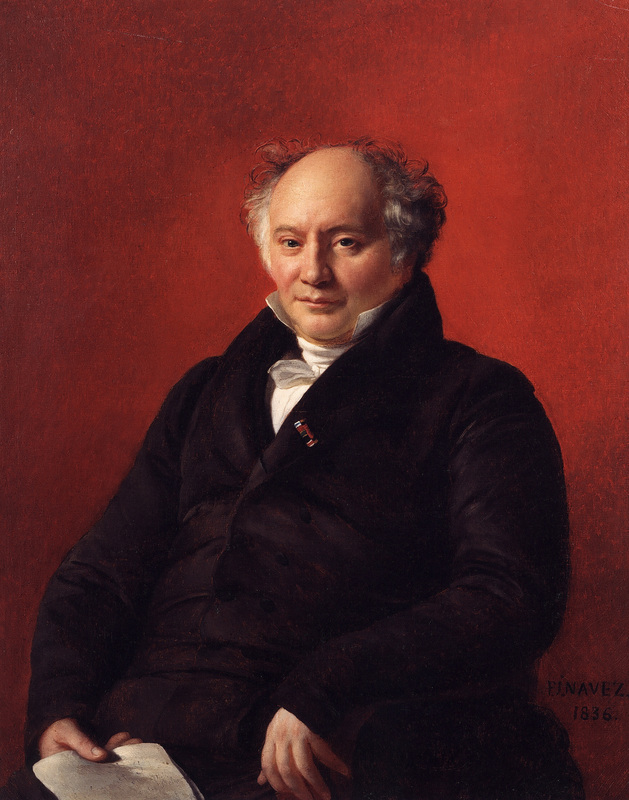
Goswin de Stassart, first Grand Master of the Grand Orient of Belgium.

- 23 January – Treaty of amity and navigation with the United States signed but never ratified.
- 23 February – Grand Orient of Belgium established, with Goswin de Stassart as first Grand Master
- 21 May – Convention of London indefinitely extends ceasefire with the Kingdom of the Netherlands following the Belgian Revolution of 1830
- 23 May – 1833 Belgian general election
- 16 June – Jean Arnould Barret consecrated as Bishop of Namur
- 18 July – Law on distilleries passed, establishing a duty of 22 centimes per hectolitre per day on distillation containers used.
- 8 September – First Daughters of the Cross make their vows (founder Marie Thérèse Haze).
- October – Opening of Sint-Barbaracollege, re-established Jesuit college in Ghent.
- 8 October – Belgian Iron Cross established to honour bravery during the Belgian Revolution
- 18 November – Treaty of Zonhoven between Belgium and the Netherlands, regulating navigation on the Meuse River

== Publications ==
- Almanach de poche de Bruxelles (Brussels, M.-E. Rampelbergh)
- Almanach de la Province de la Flandre Orientale (Ghent, Vanderhaeghe-Maya)
- Pasinomie, ou Collection complète des lois, décrets, arrêtés et règlemens généraux qui peuvent être invoqués en Belgique, vol. 1.
- Auguste Drapiez and Pierre Corneille van Geel, Encyclographie du règne végétal (Brussels)

== Births ==
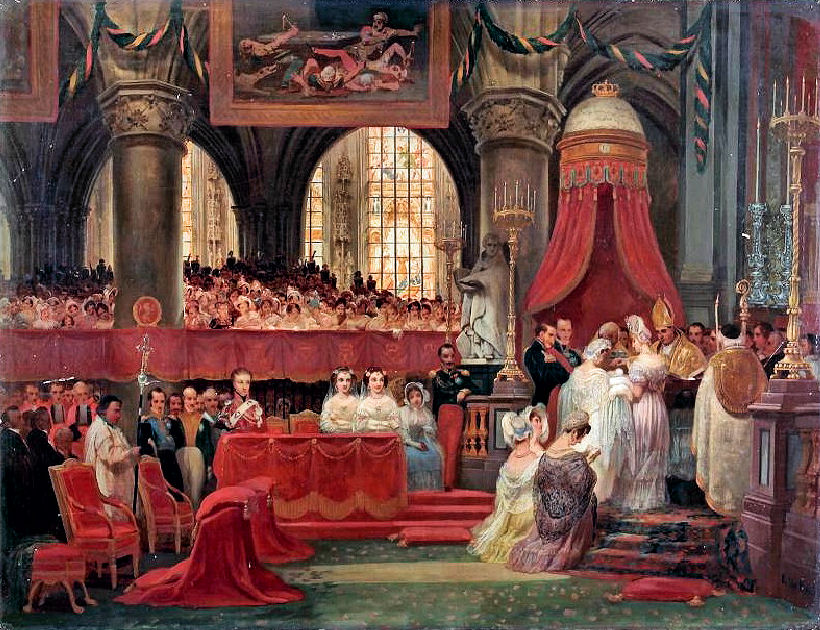
Baptism of Crown Prince Louis-Philippe, 1833

- 7 February – Eugène Anspach, governor of the national bank (died 1890)
- 18 March – José Dupuis, performer (died 1900)
- 6 April – Charles De Smedt, Church historian (died 1911)
- 24 July – Louis-Philippe, Crown Prince of Belgium (died 1834)
- 4 November – Théophile de Lantsheere, politician (died 1918)

== Deaths ==
- 20 February – Jean-Baptiste de Bouge (born 1757), cartographer
- 12 May – Philippe-Auguste Hennequin (born 1762), artist
- 26 September – Auguste Marie Raymond d'Arenberg (born 1753), aristocrat
