= 1835 in Belgium =

- Decades: 1830s; 1840s; 1850s
- See also: Other events of 1835; List of years in Belgium

Events in the year 1835 in Belgium.

== Incumbents ==
- Monarch: Leopold I
- Prime Minister: Barthélémy de Theux de Meylandt

== Events ==
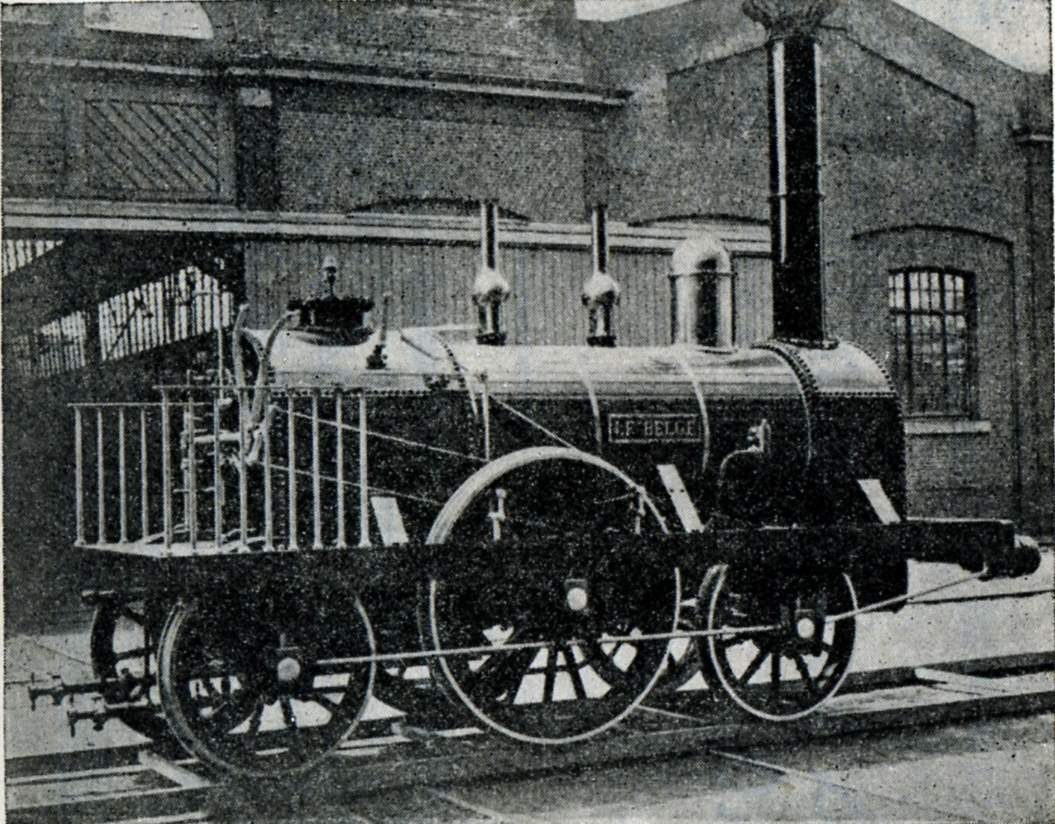
Le Belge (built 1835)

- 12 February – Court of Cassation finds that the laws on injury and manslaughter apply to participants in duels.
- 5 May – First Belgian railway line, between Brussels and Mechelen, taken into service, with three locomotives: Flèche, Eléphant, and Stephenson.
- 10 May – Gaspard-Joseph Labis becomes bishop of Tournai.
- 9 June – 1835 Belgian general election
- 8 August – Brussels Coin Cabinet opens
- 15 September – Exposition des produits de l'industrie nationale opens in Brussels.
- 10 October – Second provisional postal convention between Belgium and the Office of the Prince of Tour and Taxis signed in Brussels.
- 1 December – Catholic University of Mechelen relocates to Leuven, becoming Catholic University of Leuven.

== Art and architecture ==
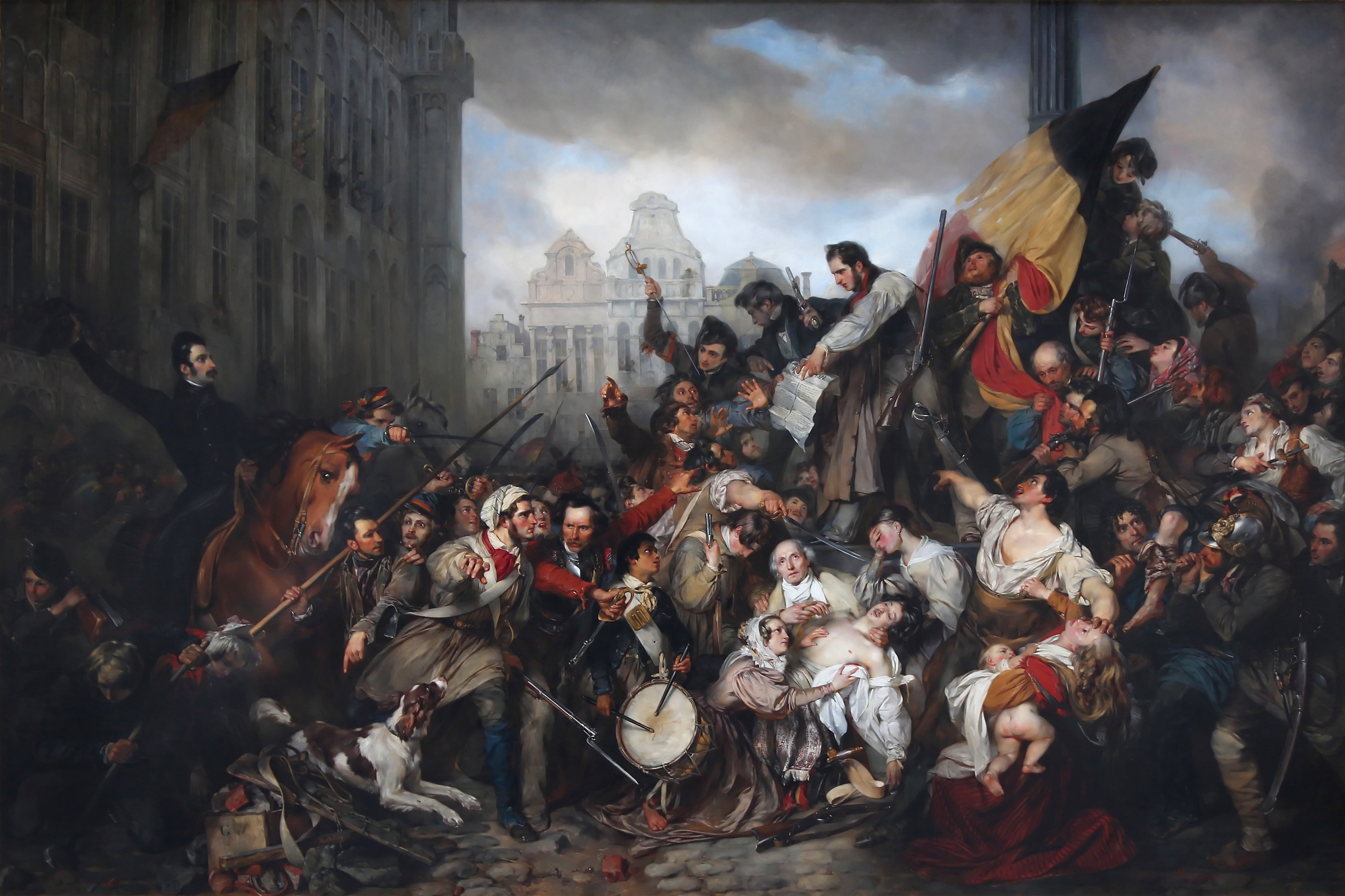
Gustaaf Wappers, Episode of the Belgian Revolution of 1830 (1835)

Painting

- Henri Decaisne, The Queen of the Belgians; Mater Dolorosa
- Gustaaf Wappers, Episode of the Belgian Revolution of 1830

== Publications ==
Periodicals

- Almanach administratif et industriel de Bruxelles (Brussels, Ad. Wahlen)
- Almanach de poche de Bruxelles (Brussels, M.-E. Rampelbergh)
- Annuaire de l'Académie royale de Belgique (Brussels, M. Hayez).
- Bulletin médical Belge.
- Bulletins de l'Académie royale des sciences et belles-lettres, Volume 2 (Brussels, M. Hayez).
- Le cultivateur, journal belge d'économie rurale.
- Messager des sciences et des arts de la Belgique, vol. 3 (Ghent, D. Duvivier).
- Revue Belge (Liége, Jeunehomme frères).

Monographs and reports

- Pasinomie: collection complète des lois, décrets, arrêtés et réglements généraux qui peuvent être invoqués en Belgique.
- De l'industrie et du commerce en Belgique (Brussels, H. Remy).
- Édouard Ducpétiaux, Statistique comparée de la criminalité en France, en Belgique, en Angleterre et en Allemagne (Brussels, L. Hauman).
- Louis Prosper Gachard (ed.), Collection de documents inédits concernant l'histoire de la Belgique, vol. 3 (Brussels, Louis Hauman).
- Jean-Baptiste Van Mons, Arbres fruitiers: leur culture en Belqique (Leuven, L. Dusart and H. Vandenbroeck).

Fiction

- Jules de Saint-Genois, Hembyse

Guide books

- A. X. Mauvy, The Stranger's Guide through Brussels and its Environs (Brussels, Adolphus Wahlen)
- The Traveller's Guide Through Belgium (Brussels, Adolphus Wahlen)

== Births ==
- 21 January – Charles du Bois de Vroylande, politician (died 1888)
- 2 February – Stanislas Bormans, archivist (died 1912)
- 9 April – Leopold II of Belgium (died 1909)
- 23 August – Jules Bara, politician (died 1900)
- 28 September – Jean Louis Gobbaerts, composer (died 1886)
- 20 October – Emile De Mot, mayor of Brussels (died 1909)
- 4 November – Amedée Visart de Bocarmé, mayor of Bruges (died 1924)

== Deaths ==
- 24 February – Gilles-Lambert Godecharle (born 1750), sculptor
- 3 June – Andreas Bernardus de Quertenmont (born 1750), artist
- 31 July – Jean Arnould Barret (born 1770), bishop
