= Félix Victor Goethals =

Belgian genealogist and librarian

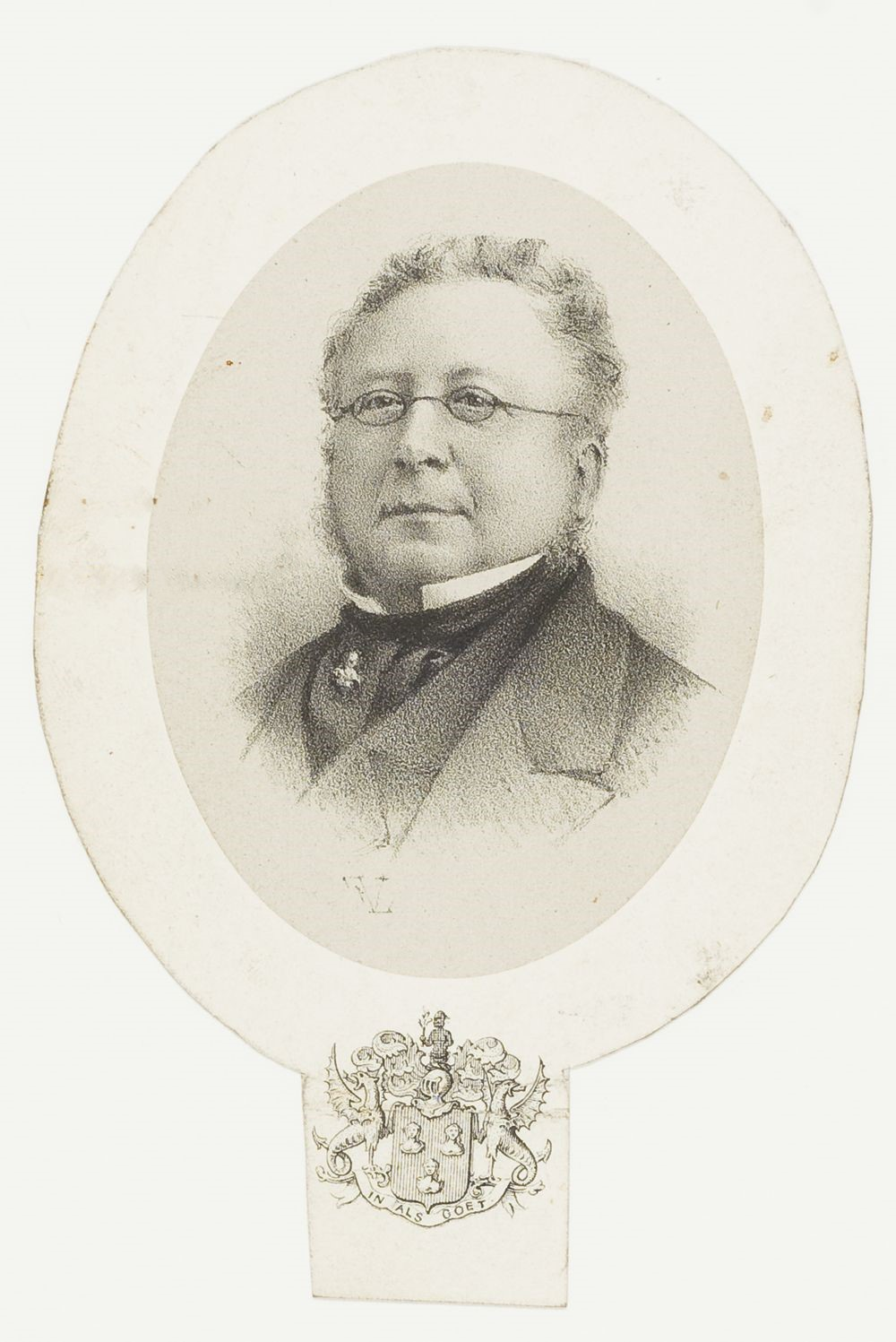
Félix Victor Goethals

Félix Victor Goethals (1798–1872) was a Belgian genealogist and librarian.

== Life ==
Goethals was born in Ghent (Département Escaut) on 4 June 1798 (16 Prairial of Year VI in the French Republican calendar). He studied law at Ghent University and interned at the public prosecutor's office in Brussels. From 1827 he worked as assistant librarian in Brussels city library, becoming head librarian in 1830. In 1842 the city sold its library collection to the Belgian state, and Goethals was responsible for transferring the holdings to the Royal Library of Belgium. The core of the Royal Library's holdings was the collection of Charles van Hulthem, bought in 1837. On 4 February 1843, Goethals was seconded to the Royal Library with the task of identifying duplicate holdings in the Van Hulthem and the Ville de Bruxelles collections that could be sold or exchanged. Resistance to this mission within the Royal Library, sustained by head librarian Reiffenberg, led to his removal on 1 April 1853. In retirement he pursued genealogical and bibliophile studies. He died in Brussels on 10 May 1872, bequeathing his own collection of 1,882 manuscripts and 2,224 printed books to the Royal Library at his death.

== Works ==
- Dictionnaire historique et bibliographique des écrivains et des artistes célèbres nés dans le royaume des Pays-Bas, vol. 1 (Brussels, 1829)
- Lectures relatives à l'histoire des sciences, des lettres, des moeurs et de la politique en Belgique et dans les pays limitrophes (4 vols., Brussels, 1837–1838)
- Notice historique sur la vie et les travaux de Simon Stévin (Brussels, 1842)
- Histoire des lettres et des arts en Belgique et dans les pays limitrophes (4 vols., Brussels, 1840–1844)
- Histoire généalogique de la Maison de Hornes (Brussels, 1848)
- Dictionnaire généalogique et héraldique des familles nobles du Royaume de Belgique (4 vols., Brussels, 1849–1852)
- Histoire généalogique de la famille Van Havre (Brussels, 1850)
- Généalogie de la famille Van Gestel (Brussels, 1851)
- Généalogie de la famille T'Serclaes (Brussels, 1853)
- Histoire genealogique de la maison de Beaufort-Spontin (Brussels, 1859)
- Histoire genealogique de la famille, des vicomtes Du Bus de Gisignies (Brussels, 1869)
- with Jules Huyttens, Indicateur nobiliaire de Belgique, de France, de Hollande, d'Allemagne etc. d'après les collections manuscrites des bibliothèques publiques de Belgique (Brussels, 1869)
