= Johan Michiel Dautzenberg =

Belgian writer

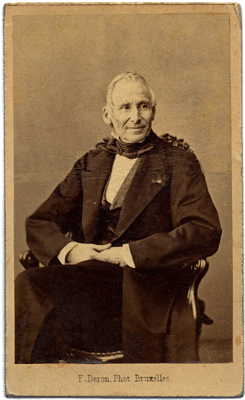
Johan Michiel Dautzenberg

Johan Michiel Dautzenberg (6 December 1808, in Heerlen – 4 February 1869, in Elsene) was a Belgian writer. Professionally he was successively secretary, clerk, teacher, private tutor, and bookkeeper.

He wrote poems on nature, songs, novels, poems concerning the Flemish movement. According to August Vermeylen, he was the first consciously Flemish writer. With his Beknopte prosodie der Nederduitsche taal (a study of Dutch prosody), he tried to convince his fellow poets to return to the classical metrics of poetry. His work shows a strong German literary influence, and he translated Loverkens by Hoffmann von Fallersleben.

His first collection, Gedichten (Poems), appeared in 1850, and the following year the first edition of his Beknopte Prosodia der Nederduitsche Taal. Many poems, songs, and literary studies followed, including an ode to miners. In 1857, he and some friends founded the educational journal De Toekomst (The Future).

He translated the Odes of Horace, which were published in 1923. A collection of his poems was published in 1869, after his death, by his son-in-law Frans de Cort as Verspreide en nagelaten gedichten.

Translations of fifty Horatian odes were rediscovered in 1910 and subsequently published. Later still, 70 letters stored in the Plantin-Moretus Museum, Antwerp, were published.

== Bibliography ==
- Gedichten (1850)
- Beknopte prosodie der Nederduitsche taal (1851)
- Loverkens (1852)
- De doop (1867)
- De moriljen (1867)
- Verspreide en nagelaten gedichten (1869)
- Oden (1923)

== See also ==
- Flemish literature

== Sources ==
- Johan Michiel Dautzenberg
- Johan Michiel Dautzenberg
- T. Verschaffel, Belg door inborst, door neigingen, door zeden, Handel. Kon. Zuid-Ned. Mij voor Taal- en Letterkunde 54 (2000), pp. 335–355.
