= Philippe Joseph Maillart =

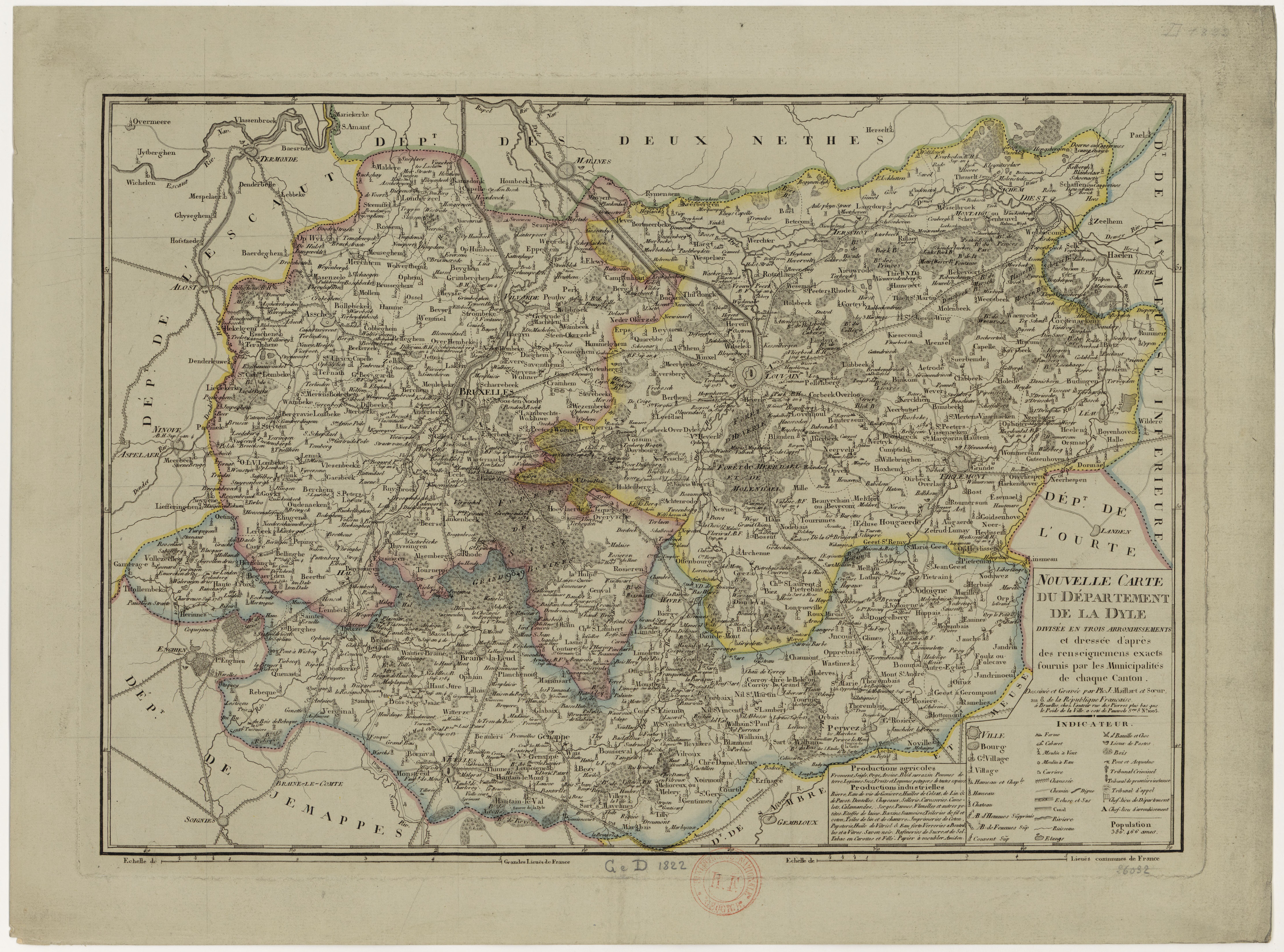
A map of the Département de la Dyle, by Philippe Joseph Maillart and his sister, Jeanne Catherine Maillart

Philippe Joseph Maillart (1764–1856) was a Belgian engraver of maps, caricatures and costume prints.

== Life ==
Maillart was born in Brussels, the son of François Joseph Maillart, a goldsmith, and Marie Livine van Wymers. He was baptised in Brussels Minster on 4 February 1764. Training as a printmaker, he specialised in cartographic engraving, sometimes working with the geographer Jean-Baptiste de Bouge. During the Brabant Revolution that led to the creation of the United Belgian States he also produced prints relating to current affairs, working from exile in Lille and Paris. Around 1799 he produced a series of prints depicting key events in the French Revolution, under the title La Galerie Historique.

He collaborated with his sister, Jeanne Catherine Maillart, on work that included a series of costume prints depicting the official uniforms of those holding public office in the French Directorate, another showing the monastic habits of the suppressed religious orders, as well as maps of the new administrative boundaries created by the French in the former United Belgian States, and of the theatres of action of the Napoleonic Wars. The last concluded with a map of the Battle of Waterloo.

Besides working as an artist, Maillart also sat on the administrative committee of the house of detention in Vilvoorde, where he was appointed a justice of the peace on 19 September 1824. He remained in that post through the Belgian Revolution. In later life, after being widowed, he moved to Ixelles, where he died on 23 April 1856.

== Works ==
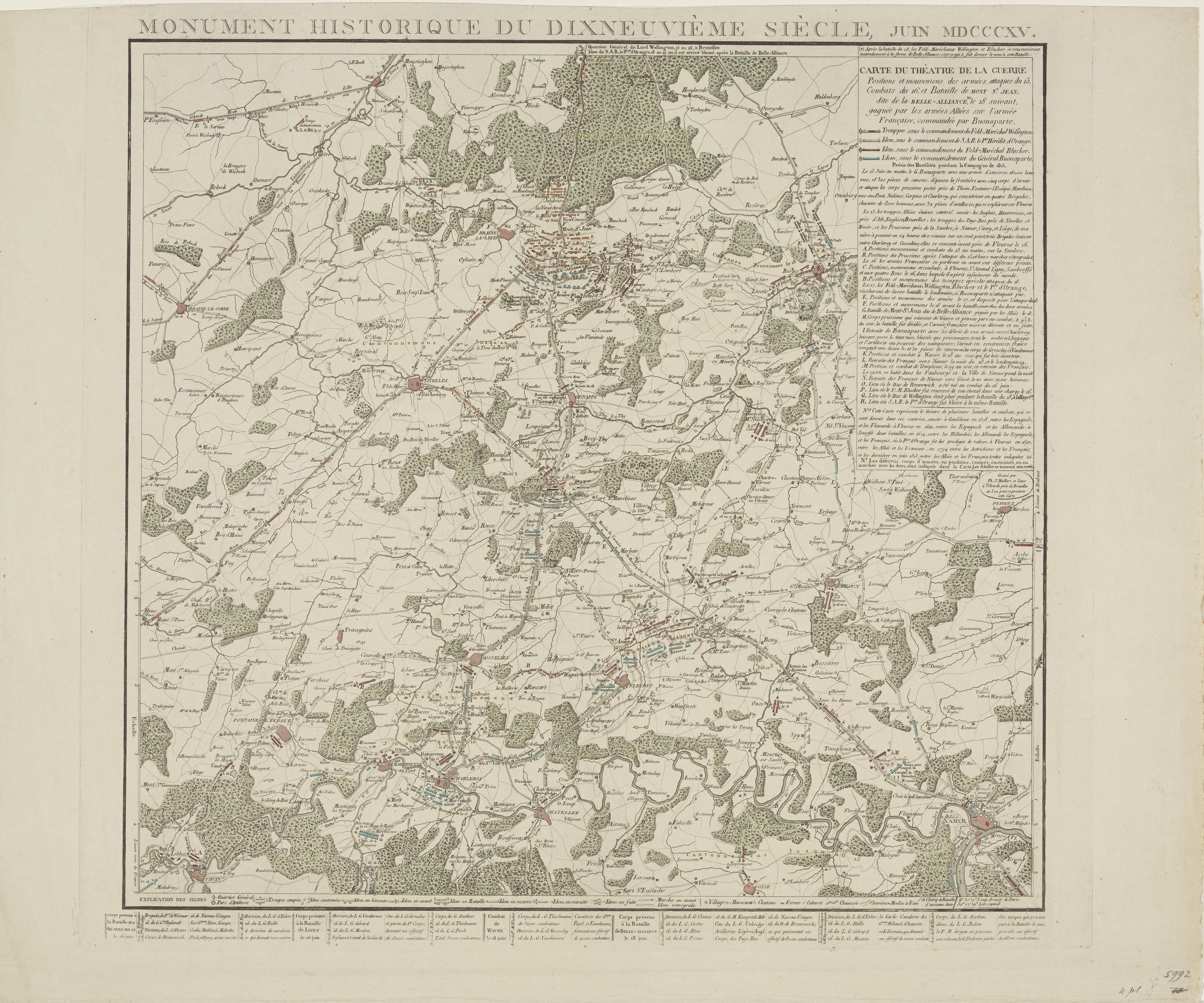
Monument historique du dixneuvième siècle. Juin MDCCCXV, showing the locations of the fighting culminating in the Battle of Waterloo, 15–18 June 1815

- Carte du théâtre de la guerre actuelle en Allemagne (1796)
- Carte de la guerre actuelle en Italie (1797)
- La Galerie Historique, ou Tableaux des Evénemens de la Révolution Française (c.1799)
- Nouvelle Carte du département de la Dyle (1799)
- Nouvelle Carte du département de la Lys (1800)
- Nouvelle Carte du département des Deux-Nèthes (1800)
- Collection de costumes de tous les ordres monastiques supprimés à différentes époques dans la ci-devant Belgique (1811)
- Carte du théâtre de la guerre dans le nord de l'Allemagne (1813)
- Monument historique du dixneuvième siècle. Juin MDCCCXV (1815)
- Plan topographique de la ville de Bruxelles et de ses faubourgs (1816)
- Nouvelles Cartes des provinces de la Flandre orientale, de Namur, du Brabant méridional, du Hainaut, de la province de Liège, de la province d'Anvers
- Vue de la place Royale à Bruxelles
