= Frans de Cort =

Belgian writer

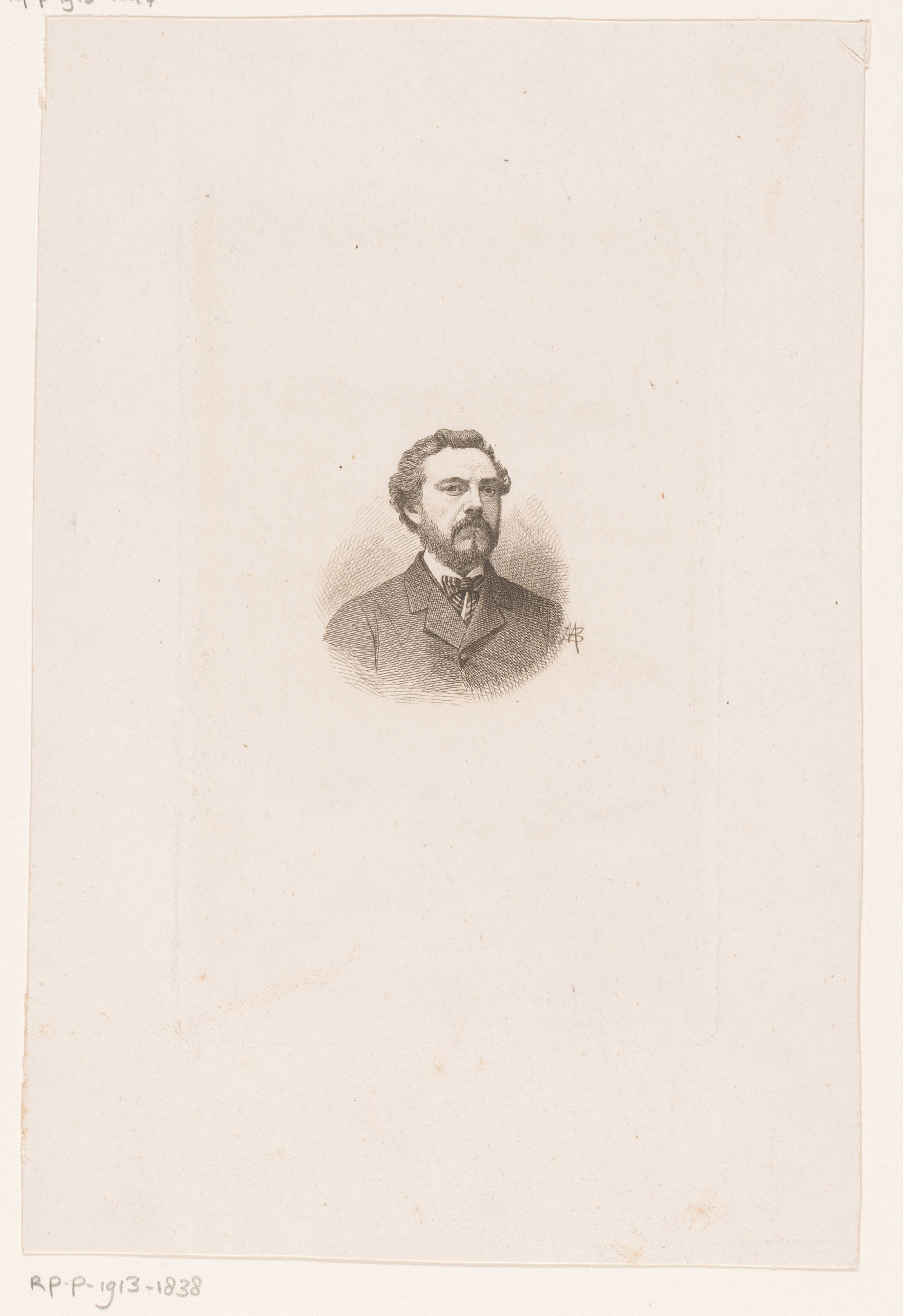
Frans de Cort

Frans Jozef de Cort (21 June 1834, in Antwerp – 18 January 1878, in Elsene), was a Flemish writer.

== Life ==
De Cort was born and brought up in Antwerp, where he became a shipping clerk, in 1861 moving to Brussels to serve as clerk of the military court.

Together with Jan Theodoor van Rijswijck he published the journal De Grondwet from 1857 to 1858. From 1858 to 1861 he was editor of the magazine De Schelde. From 1861 onwards he was editor-in-chief of De Toekomst, an illustrated educational magazine founded by his father-in-law Johan Michiel Dautzenberg. He was a convinced Flemish-liberal poet, and he wrote songs like those of Jan Theodoor van Rijswijck, and also more romantic songs, such as Moeder en kind (meaning "Mother and child"), which excelled by their simplicity.

He devoted himself to the more technical side of poetry and translated songs by Robert Burns (De schoonste liederen van R. Burns, 1862) and the Odes of Horace.

== Bibliography ==
- Liederen, eerste reeks (Antwerp, 1857)
- Liederen, tweede reeks (Antwerp, 1859)
- De schoonste Liederen van Robert Burns (Brussels, 1862)
- Het gebruik der talen in België, under the pen name Frans Reynen (Brussels, 1864)
- Zingzang (Brussels, 1866)
- Liederen (Groningen, 1868)

== See also ==
- Flemish literature
