= Jean-Baptiste de Bouge =

Belgian cartographer

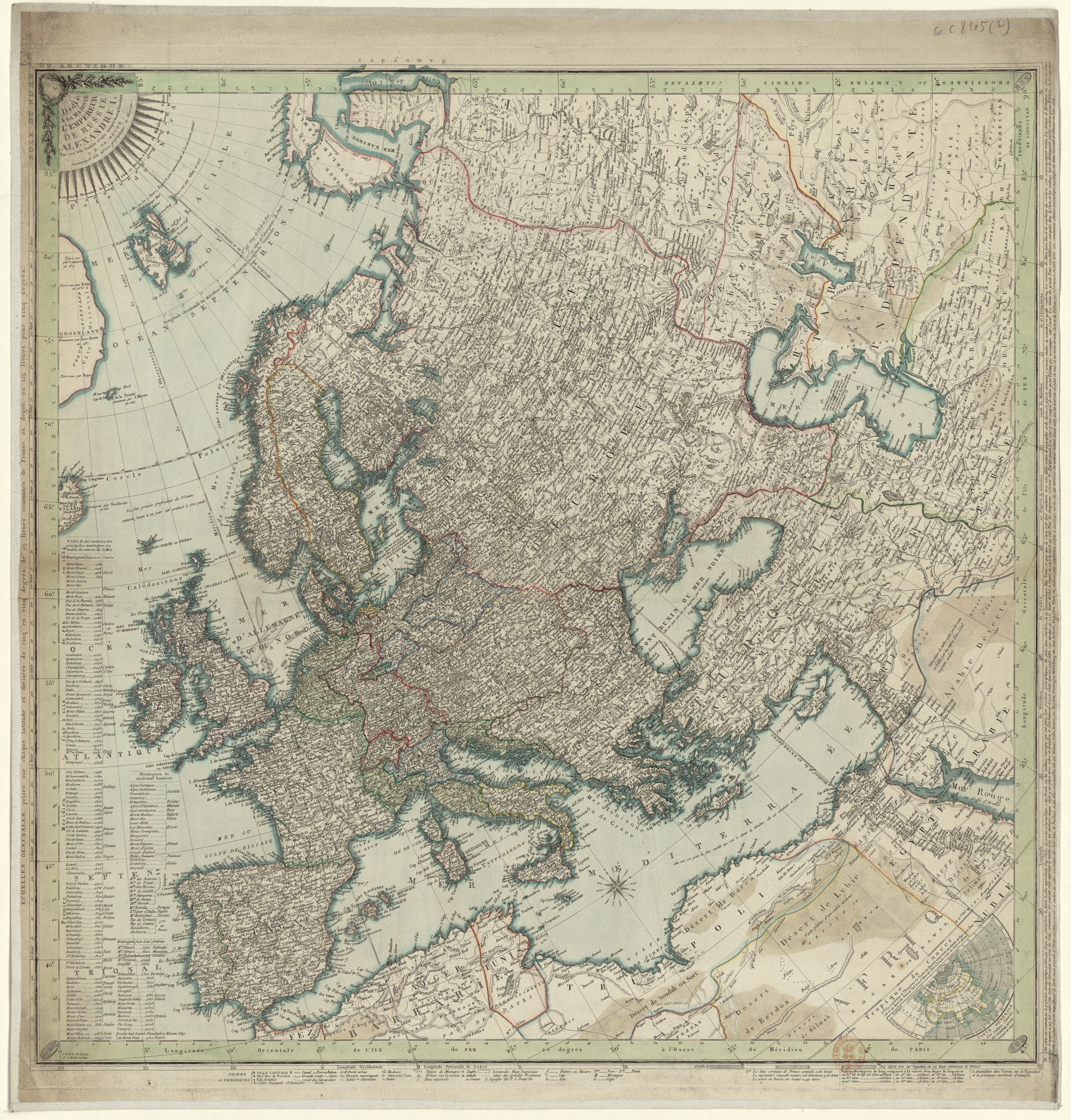
A new map of Europe (1810) by J.-B. de Bouge, showing the Continent's transformation by French conquests

Jean-Baptiste de Bouge (1757–1833) was a Belgian cartographer whose career spanned decades of major political upheaval, his country in turn being (part of) the Austrian Netherlands, the United Belgian States, the French First Republic, the Napoleonic Empire, and the United Kingdom of the Netherlands, before becoming the Kingdom of Belgium. He often worked with the cartographic engraver Philippe Joseph Maillart.

== Life ==
De Bouge was born in Ixelles on 5 January 1757 to Joseph-Ernst de Bouge and Marie-Anne Brems. His first official position, in 1782, was as surveyor and cartographer to the Duchy of Guelders. During the French invasion of 1794 he fled the Southern Netherlands. He found refuge first at Nijmegen, in 1796 at Mainz, and in 1797 at Vienna. Listed as an émigré by the Revolutionary authorities, his property was sequestered.

In 1806 De Bouge produced guidebooks to Aachen, Antwerp, and Paris (all published in Brussels), and the same year became head of the Topographical Bureau of the Kingdom of Holland. In 1808 he attempted to establish an engravers' school in Amsterdam.

In 1810 De Bouge's department was transferred to Paris, and his wife, Marie-Thérèse Moss, died there on 29 October 1814. He retired the same year.

De Bouge died at The Hague on 20 February 1833.

== Works ==
=== Maps ===
- Carte chorographique du duché de Brabant (1778)

Available online from the Royal Library of Belgium.

- Carte générale correspondante aux cartes particulieres comprenant les tenances & routes des postes (1783)

Available online from the Royal Library of Belgium.

- Nouvelle Carte de la Grande et Petite Moere: Situées dans la Flandres Autrichienne et Françoise entre les villes des Furnes et Dunkercke (1784)
- Nouvelle carte chorographique des Pays-Bas autrichiens (1786)

Available online from the Bibliothèque Nationale de France.

- Carte Topographique du Pays de Waes (1788)

Available online from the Koninklijke Oudheidkundige Kring van het Land van Waas.

- Carte générale des bureaux et ténances des postes des Pays-Bas autrichiens (1789)

Available online from the Royal Library of Belgium.

- Plan de Luxembourg avec ses nouveaux ouvrages (1790)

Available online from the Biblioteca Nacional de Portugal.

- Carte du Théatre de la Guerre aux Pays-Bas, en 1790 (1791)

Available online from Bibliotheca Andana.

- Carte itinéraire et partie du théatre de la guerre (1793)

Available online from the Royal Library of Belgium.

- Carte Du Département du Nord Ou Les Provinces de Flandre, du Hainaut et du Cambresis (1794).
- Carte chorographique de la Grande Principauté de Transilvanie (1799)

Available online from the Bibliothèque Nationale de France.

- Nouvelle Carte Chorographique Des Etats Du Roy De Sardaigne (1800).
- Carte de l'Europe (1803).
- Carte géographi-diplomatique suivant les derniers traités de paix (1803)

Available online from the Bibliothèque Nationale de France.

- Nouvelle description ou tableau géographique et historique de l'Europe (1809)
- Monument historique du dix-neuvième siècle juin MDCCCXV (1815) – a map of the Battle of Waterloo
- Carte générale-administrative du royaume des Pays-Bas [c. 1816]

Available online from the Royal Library of Belgium.

- Plan topographique de la ville de Bruxelles et de ses faubourgs (1816)

Available online from the Royal Library of Belgium.

- Carte Chorographique du Royaume des Pays-Bas (1823) – in 17 parts

Available online from the National Archives of Hungary.

- Carte générale des provinces belgiques (1823)

Available online from the Royal Library of Belgium.

- Plan topographique de la ville de Bruxelles et de ses faubourgs (1823)

Available online from the Royal Library of Belgium.

- Ichnographie des édifices et monumens royaux et publics de Paris (1824)

Available online from the Bibliothèque Nationale de France.

- Petit Atlas du Plat-Pays (1829)

=== Books ===
- Guide des étrangers ou Itinéraire de la ville d'Anvers (Brussels, 1806)

Available online from Google Books.

- La Boussole, ou le Guide des étrangers dans Paris (Brussels, 1806)
- Guide des étrangers ou Itinéraire de la ville d'Aix-la-Chapelle (Brussels, 1806)
- Manuel géographique statistique et administratif du royaume des Pays Bas (Brussels, 1821)

Available online from Google Books.
