= Émile de Borchgrave =

Belgian historian and diplomat

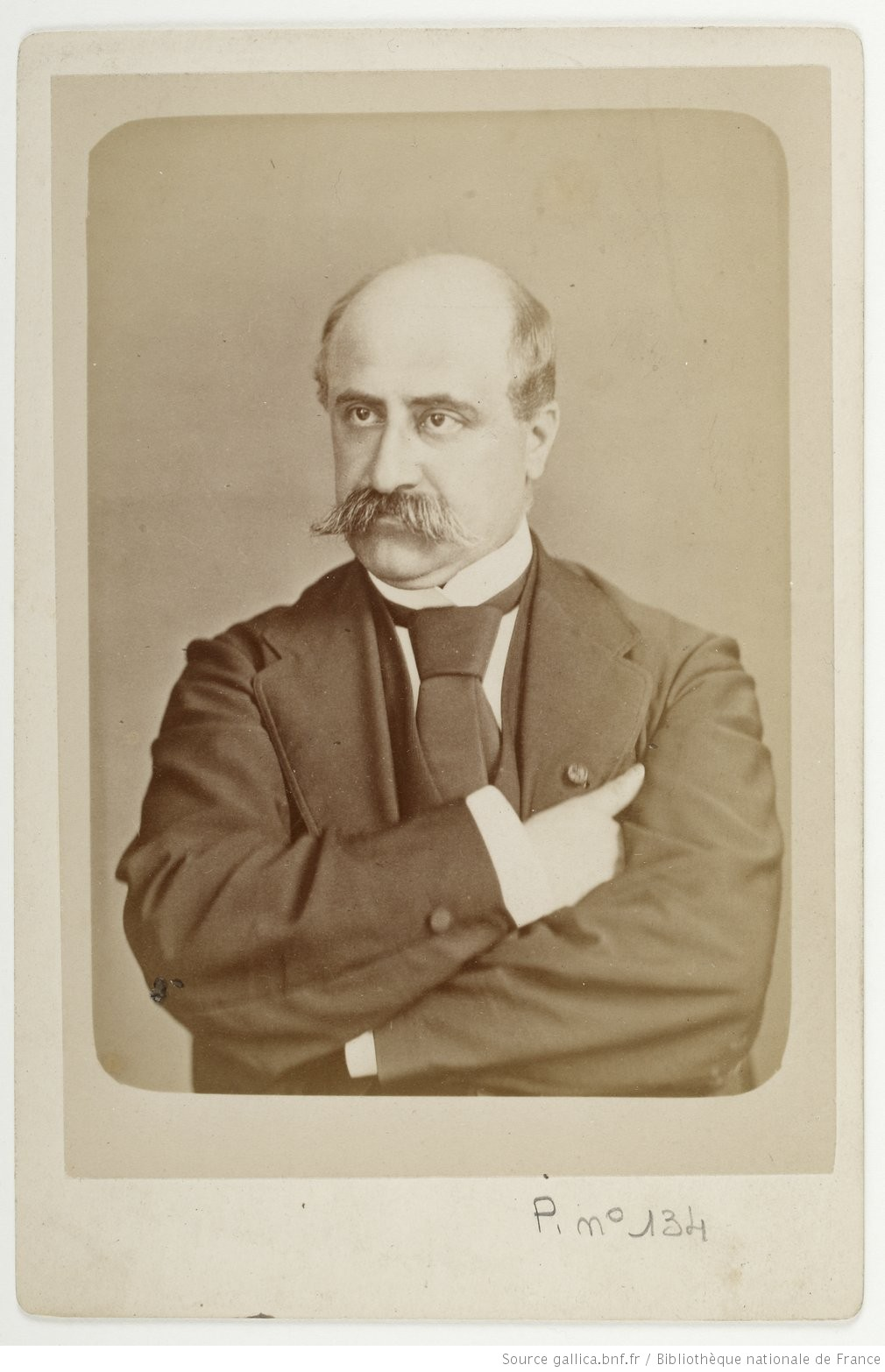
Photographic portrait by Alexandre Quinet

Baron Émile Jacques Yvon Marie de Borchgrave (1837–1917) was a Belgian historian and diplomat.

== Life ==
Borchgrave was born in Ghent on 27 December 1837. He was educated at the College of St Barbara in Ghent and spent one year studying philosophy at the University of Paris before obtaining a doctorate in law from Ghent University. At the age of 25 he entered the Belgian foreign service. He was posted to The Hague in 1863, to Frankfurt in 1866, and then to Bern.

Borchgrave returned to Brussels to work at the ministry in 1869, and in 1872 became a member of the Royal Academy of Science, Letters and Fine Arts of Belgium. He was secretary to the 1874 Brussels Peace Conference, and a delegate at the 1876 Brussels Geographic Conference.

In 1875 he was appointed to the Belgian legation in Berlin, in 1879 chargé d'affaires in Serbia, in 1885 ambassador to Istanbul, Ottoman Empire and in 1892 minister plenipotentiary in Vienna. During his time in Constantinople he mediated a conflict between Persia and Italy in 1890, and published a number of studies on Albania, Epirus and Macedonia. He retired from active diplomacy in 1909 and was appointed president of the Belgian Academy. He died in Ixelles (Brussels) on 19 September 1917.

== Publications ==
- Histoire des colonies belges, qui s'établirent en Allemagne pendant le XIIe et le XIIIe siècle (Brussels, 1864–1865)
- Histoire des rapports de droit public qui existèrent entre les provinces belges et l'Empire d'Allemagne depuis le démembrement de la monarchie carolingienne jusqu'à l'incorporation de la Belgique à la République française (Brussels, 1870)
- Essai historique sur les colonies belges qui s'établirent en Hongrie et en Transylvanie pendant les XIe, XIIe et XIIIe siècles (Brussels, 1871)
- Souvenirs diplomatiques de quarante ans (Brussels, 1908)
