= Brothers of Our Lady of Lourdes =

Insignia of the FNDL

The Brothers of Our Lady of Lourdes (French: Frères de Notre-Dame-de-Lourdes, Latin: Fratres Nostrae Dominae de Lurdensis, FNDL) are a Roman Catholic religious congregation founded in 1830 by Belgian priest Étienne-Modeste Glorieux (1802-1872). The congregation is dedicated to education and formation of the youth, particularly in technical training. The congregation was approved and given pontifical status by Pope Leo XIII in 1892.

Numbering 198 in 2009 the brothers are active in Belgium, the Netherlands, the Democratic Republic of Congo, Indonesia (as Bruder Budi Mulia), Ethiopia and Brazil.
