= Joseph Jean De Smet =

Priest, historian, and participant in the Belgian Revolution of 1830

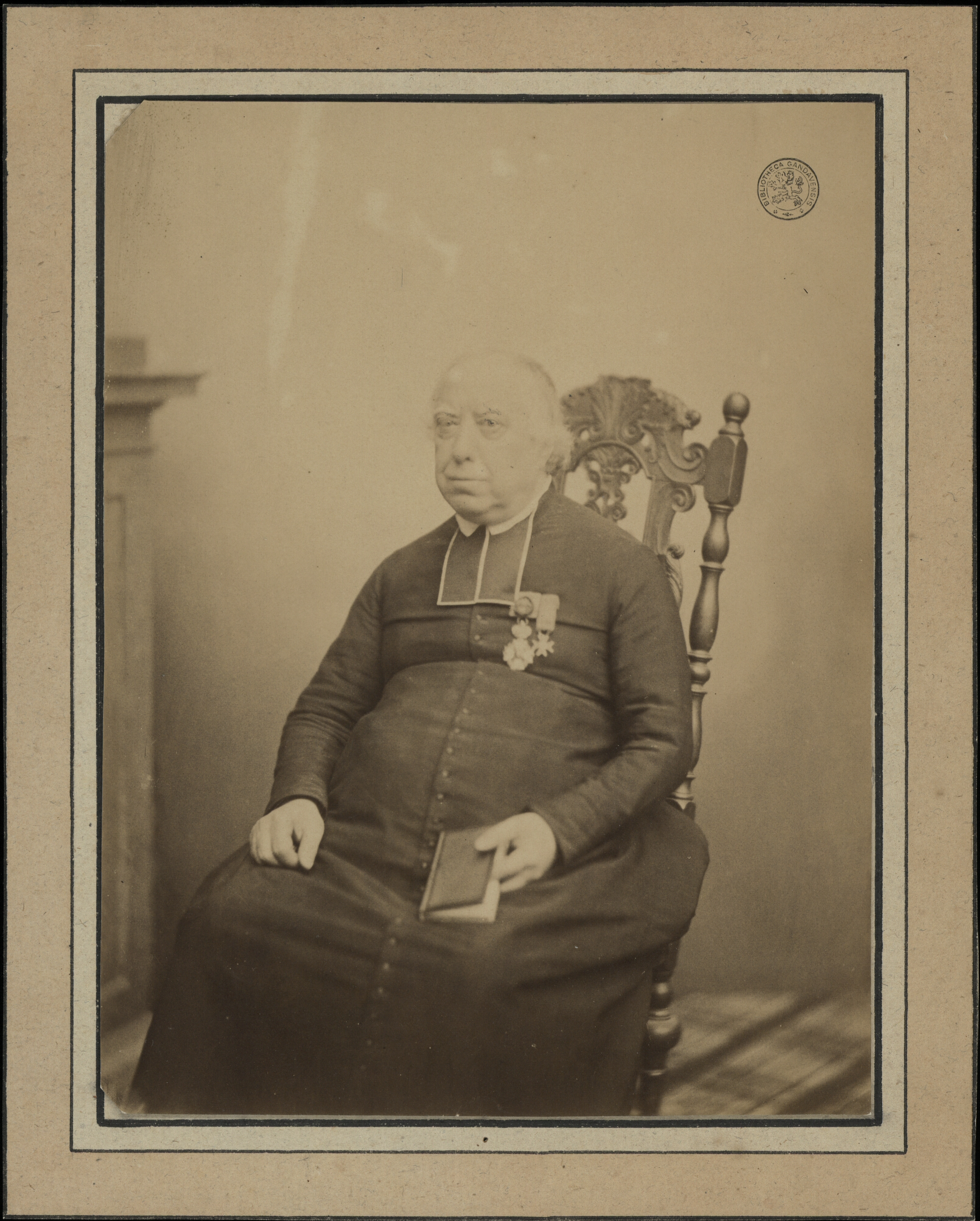
Joseph Jean De Smet

Joseph Jean De Smet (1794–1877) was a priest and historian who took part in the Belgian Revolution of 1830.

== Life ==
De Smet was born in Ghent, in what was then the County of Flanders in the Austrian Netherlands, on 11 December 1794. His secondary and seminary education was in Ghent. At the age of 25 he became professor of rhetoric at the minor seminary of St Barbara, and shortly afterwards at the diocesan college in Aalst. While teaching he wrote new textbooks on Belgian history, world geography and Latin rhetoric, adapted to the needs of Catholic education in the United Kingdom of the Netherlands which had come into being in 1815. These books, with some revisions, remained widely used in Belgian schools up to the middle of the century.

In 1825, William I's education policy led to the closure of the diocesan schools. De Smet became a polemical writer against the policy, particularly contributing to his friend Adolphe Bartels's Le Catholique des Pays-Bas. In 1830 he was delegated to the National Congress of Belgium, where he was outspoken on behalf of the independence of the Church.

After fulfilling his mandate he was appointed professor at the Major Seminary of Ghent and a canon of Ghent Cathedral. For the next 25 years he taught Ecclesiastical History at the seminary. On 6 June 1835 he was elected to the Royal Academy of Science, Letters and Fine Arts of Belgium. He was also appointed to the Commission royale d'Histoire at its foundation, and was charged with working on the publication of the Corpus Chronicorum Flandriae.

He died in Ghent on 13 February 1877. Joseph Kervyn de Lettenhove gave the eulogy at his funeral.

== Writings ==
Besides his publications in the periodicals of the Belgian Academy, De Smet was a contributor to the Revue de Bruxelles and the Messager des sciences historiques, as well as to the early volumes of the Biographie Nationale de Belgique.

His other publications include:

- Nouvelle géographie. Vol. 1 (2nd ed.). Ghent: Vanryckgem-Hovaere. 1831.
- Nouvelle géographie. Vol. 2 (2nd ed.). Ghent: Vanryckgem-Hovaere. 1831.
- Coup-d'oeil sur l'histoire ecclésiastique dans les premières années du XIXe siècle. Ghent: Vanryckegem-Hovaere. 1836.
- Recueil des chroniques de Flandre. Vol. 1. Brussels: Commission royale d'Histoire. 1837.
- Abrégé de l'histoire de la Belgique (3rd ed.). Ghent: Vanryckeghem-Hovaere. 1839.
- Histoire de la Belgique. Vol. 1 (5th ed.). Ghent: Vanryckegem-Hovaere. 1839.
- Histoire de la Belgique. Vol. 2 (5th ed.). Ghent: Vanryckeghem-Hovaere. 1840.
- Smet, Joseph Jean De (1840). Les quatres journées de Gand (13, 14, 15, 16 novembre 1789).
- Recueil des chroniques de Flandre. Vol. 2. Brussels: Commission royale d'Histoire. 1841.
- Recueil des chroniques de Flandre. Vol. 3. Brussels: Commission royale d'Histoire. 1856.
- Vie de Saint-Liévin, patron de Gand et apôtre du pays d'Alost. Ghent: Vanryckegem-Lepère. 1857.
- Recueil des chroniques de Flandre. Vol. 4. Brussels: Commission royale d'Histoire. 1865.
- Mémoire historique sur la guerre de Maximilien, roi des Romains, contre les villes de Flandre (1480-1488). Brussels: Académie royale des sciences, des lettres et des beaux-arts de Belgique. 1865.
