= Amedée Visart de Bocarmé =

Belgian Catholic Party politician

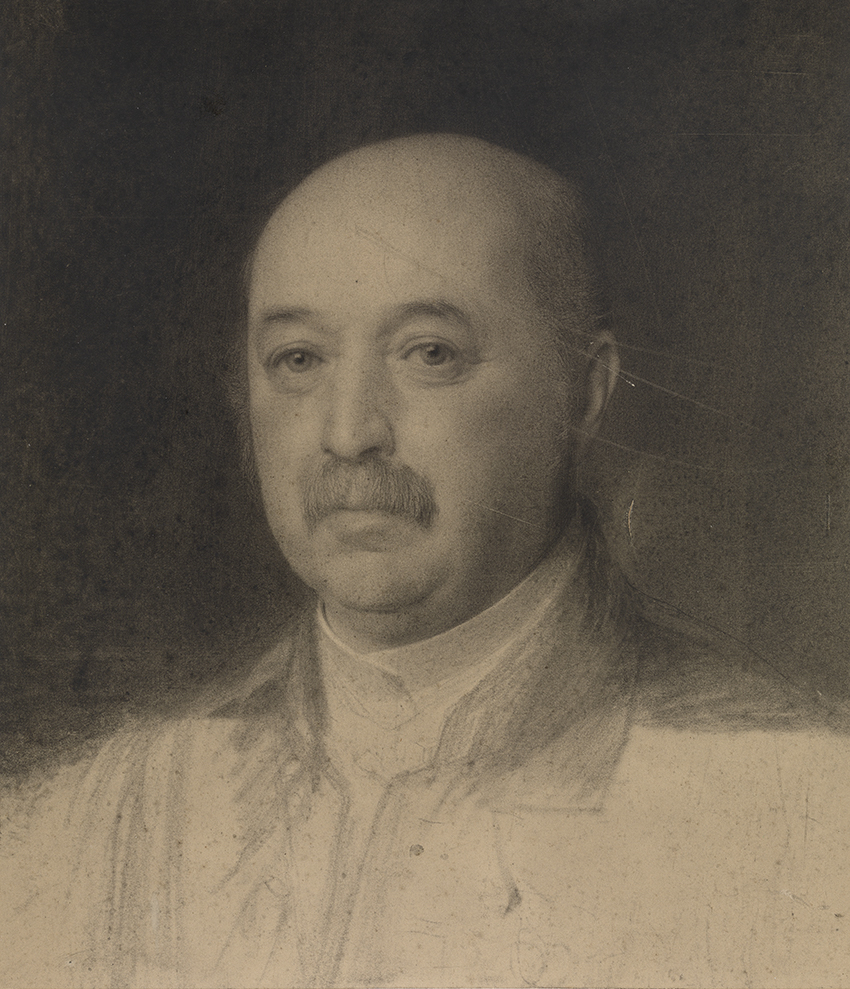
Portrait of Amedée Visart de Bocarmé

Count Amédée Charles Louis Visart de Bocarmé (4 November 1835 – 29 May 1924) was a Belgian Catholic Party politician who served as mayor of Bruges for almost fifty years, from 1876 to 1924, and as a member of the Belgian Chamber of Representatives for the Bruges constituency for over fifty years, from 1868 to 1921. As a member of parliament he took a particular interest in social legislation.

Visart was a member of the organising committee of the Ghent Planning Congress 1913, "the first genuinely international conference to address all aspects of civic life and design".

== Honours ==
- 1921: Grand cordon in the Order of Leopold.
