= Auguste Voisin =

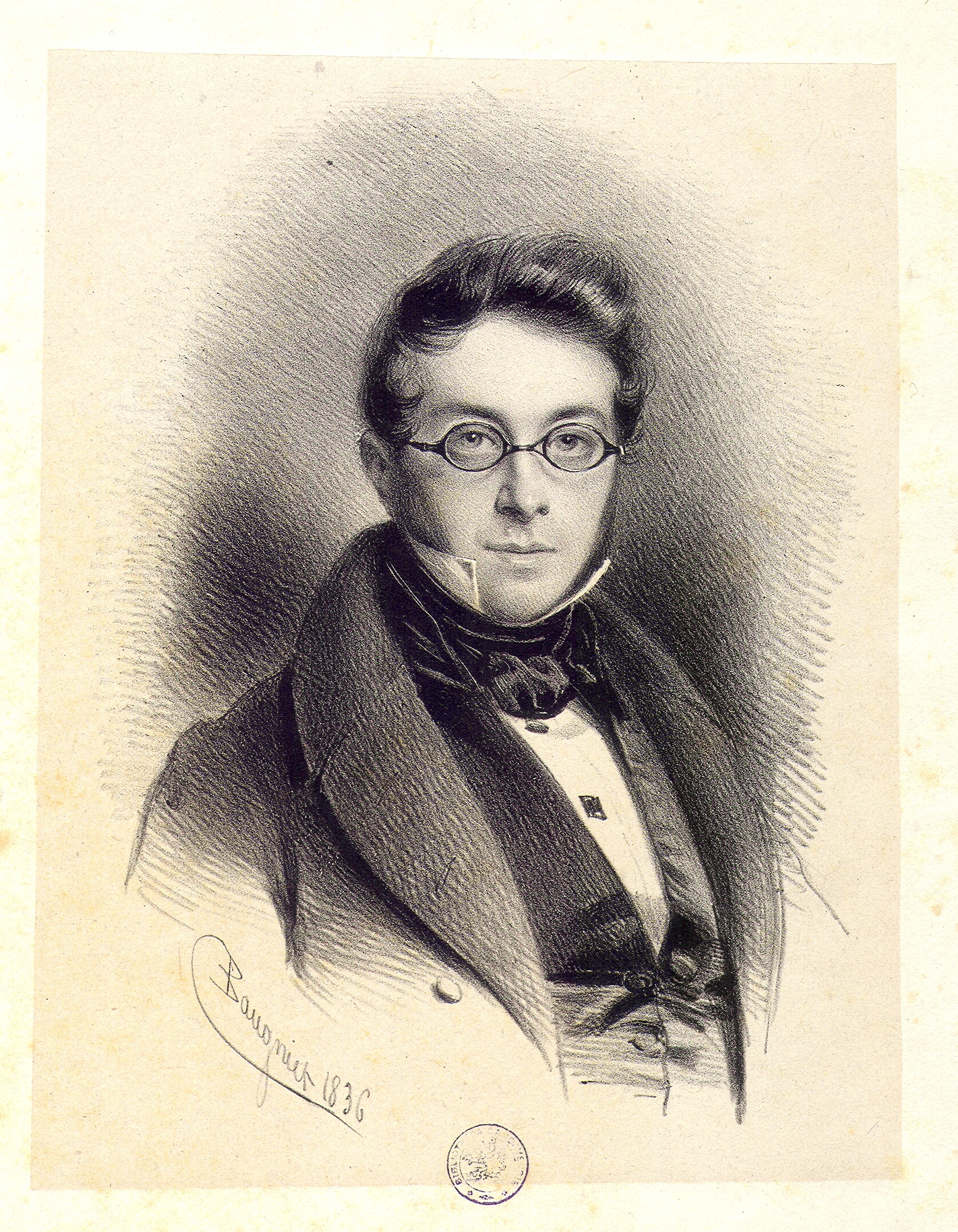
Portrait, 1836

Auguste Voisin (1800–1843) was a French-born Belgian historian, librarian and university professor.

== Life ==
Voisin was born in Pernes-lès-Boulogne on 9 March 1800 and was educated at the royal college in Ghent and then Ghent University, where he graduated Ph.D. in 1824. From 1825 to 1830, he taught rhetoric at a school in Kortrijk, and in 1830 became a private tutor in Ghent. He went on to teach Greek literature at the university, and on 13 April 1836 was appointed university librarian. He recatalogued the university's law collection. He also catalogued the library of the bibliophile Charles van Hulthem (1764–1832), which in 1837 was bought by the Royal Library of Belgium as the heart of its collection.

From 1834 to 1838, he was permanent secretary to the Société des Beaux-Arts et de Littérature in Ghent, then becoming deputy secretary of the Académie royale de Peinture de Gand. On 15 December 1837, he was elected a corresponding member of the Royal Academy of Science, Letters and Fine Arts of Belgium, and in 1840 he was appointed extraordinary professor at the university. He was among the editorial board that in 1839 launched the Messager des sciences historiques. He died of a brain haemorrhage while dining with a friend in Ghent on 4 February 1843, and was buried three days later.

== Publications ==
- Guide des voyageurs dans la ville de Gand, ou Notice historique sur cette ville, ses monumens et ses hommes célèbres (Ghent, Vandekerckhove, 1826); further editions in 1831 and 1838.
- La bataille de Woeringen: récit historique (Brussels, Société des Beaux-Arts, 1839)
