= Edmond Reusens =

Belgian historian and archaeologist

- Born: 25 April 1831; Wijnegem, Antwerp
- Died: 25 December 1903 (age 72); Leuven
- Occupations: Archeologist & historian

Edmond Henri Joseph Reusens (25 April 1831 in Wijnegem, Antwerp – 25 December 1903 in Leuven) was a Belgian archeologist and historian.

== Biography ==
Sent to the University of Leuven immediately after his ordination to the priesthood (1854), he soon became head librarian of the university (1859–1896). He collaborated with his rector, Pierre François Xavier de Ram, in his works on the religious history of Belgium, and in 1864 they founded the review Analectes pour servir à l'histoire ecclésiastique de la Belgique, which Reusens continued to direct until his death. With the same teacher, he became interested in the history of the University of Leuven, to which he devoted almost exclusively the last years of his life.

Through his historical studies he acquired a knowledge of palaeography and diplomatics and became professor of a course in these branches (1881–1903) which was the first of its kind in Belgium. In 1900 he was appointed member of the Royal Commission of History (Brussels). After teaching theology for two years he had charge of a new course in Christian archaeology from 1864-1900. In this department he soon acquired great distinction, as is evidenced by the success of his manual, his appointment (1884) to the Royal Commission of Monuments (Brussels), his participation in the exposition of ancient art, and his role in the renovation of religious art in Belgium.

== Works ==
His principal works are:

- Eléments d'archéologie chrétienne (Leuven, 1871-5)
- Eléments de paléographie (Leuven, 1899)
- Documents relatifs à l'histoire de l'université de Leuven (Leuven, 1881–1903).

== Sources ==
- . Cites:
  - Annuaire de l'universite catholique de Louvain (1905) pp. xv-xxiii;
  - Universite catholique de Louvain, bibliography and supplement, I, II, III (Leuven, 1900, 1902, 1904, 1906)
