= Charles-Joseph de Harlez de Deulin =

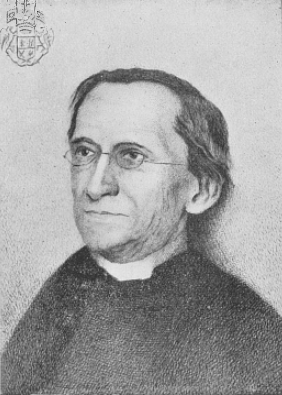
Charles de Harlez

Charles-Joseph de Harlez de Deulin (Liège, 21 August 1832 – Leuven, 14 July 1899) was a Belgian Orientalist, domestic prelate, canon of the cathedral of Liège, and member of the Academie Royale of Belgium, who studied and translated the Zoroastrian holy texts.

== Biography ==
The family of de Harlez was an old and noble family of Liège. On completing his ordinary college course, de Harlez devoted himself to the study of law in the University of Liège. His success in legal studies was considerable, and a strong doctorate examination in 1855 brought his career at the law school to a close. His family connections and his own ability gave promise of a bright future, but, growing dissatisfied with the law, de Harlez soon abandoned the legal profession altogether.

He then took up the study of theology, and in 1858 was ordained a priest. After his ordination he was appointed director of the college of Saint-Quirin in Huy. In 1867 he was put in charge of a new arts school which had been established for young ecclesiastics in connection with the Catholic University of Louvain. This position he held for four years. In 1871, he was appointed to a professorship in the Oriental department of the Louvain Catholic University. There he studied the Avesta, publishing a translation in 1875–77.

In 1771, Anqueil-Duperron (1731-1805) had published the first translation of the Avesta obtained from the Indian Zoroastrians, and, in 1852, Friedrich von Spiegel (1820-1905) published a translation into German. The translation of de Harlez was an addition to Avesta exegesis, and the second edition of the work appeared in 1881. The relationship between the Rig Veda and the Avesta was not yet fully understood, and de Harlez set himself to determine it. He emphasized the differences, in spite of many apparent agreements, between the two texts. His view met with much opposition, but some of his opponents - for instance James Darmesteter - reportedly came round to his point of view.

In 1881, de Harlez founded a journal, Muséon, which was intended to be devoted to the objective study of history generally and of religious history in particular. He was its first chief editor, and contributed many of its early articles. In 1883, he turned to a new department: the language, literature, and historical religion of China. He was all the time professor of Sanskrit in the university and produced a Sanskrit manual for the use of his students.

He also made himself familiar with Manchu literature, and in 1884 he published in Louvain a handbook of the Manchu language. Under him the school of Louvain Oriental studies flourished. The Mélanges Charles de Harlez (Leyden, 1896), a collection of more than fifty scientific articles written by scholars of all countries and creeds, was presented to him on the twenty-fifth anniversary of his Louvain professorship.

== Other publications ==
- Manuel de la langue de l'Avesta (Paris, 1879; 2nd ed., 1888)
- Manuel du Pehlevi (Paris, 1880)
- Etudes éraniennes (Paris, 1880)
- La Bible dans l' Inde (The Bible in India; Paris, 1882)
- Le texte originaire du Yih-King (Original text of the I Ching)
- Védisme, brahmanisme et christianisme (Brussels, 1881)
- La Siao Hio ou Morale de la jeunesse avec le commentaire de Tchen-Siuen (1889)
- Textes Tâoïstes, traduit des originaux chinois et commentés. [Laozi, Daodejing] Annales du Musée Giumet XX. (Paris, 1891) Erstmals mit Kommentar des Wang Bi!
