= Theodoor van Rijswijck =

Flemish writer

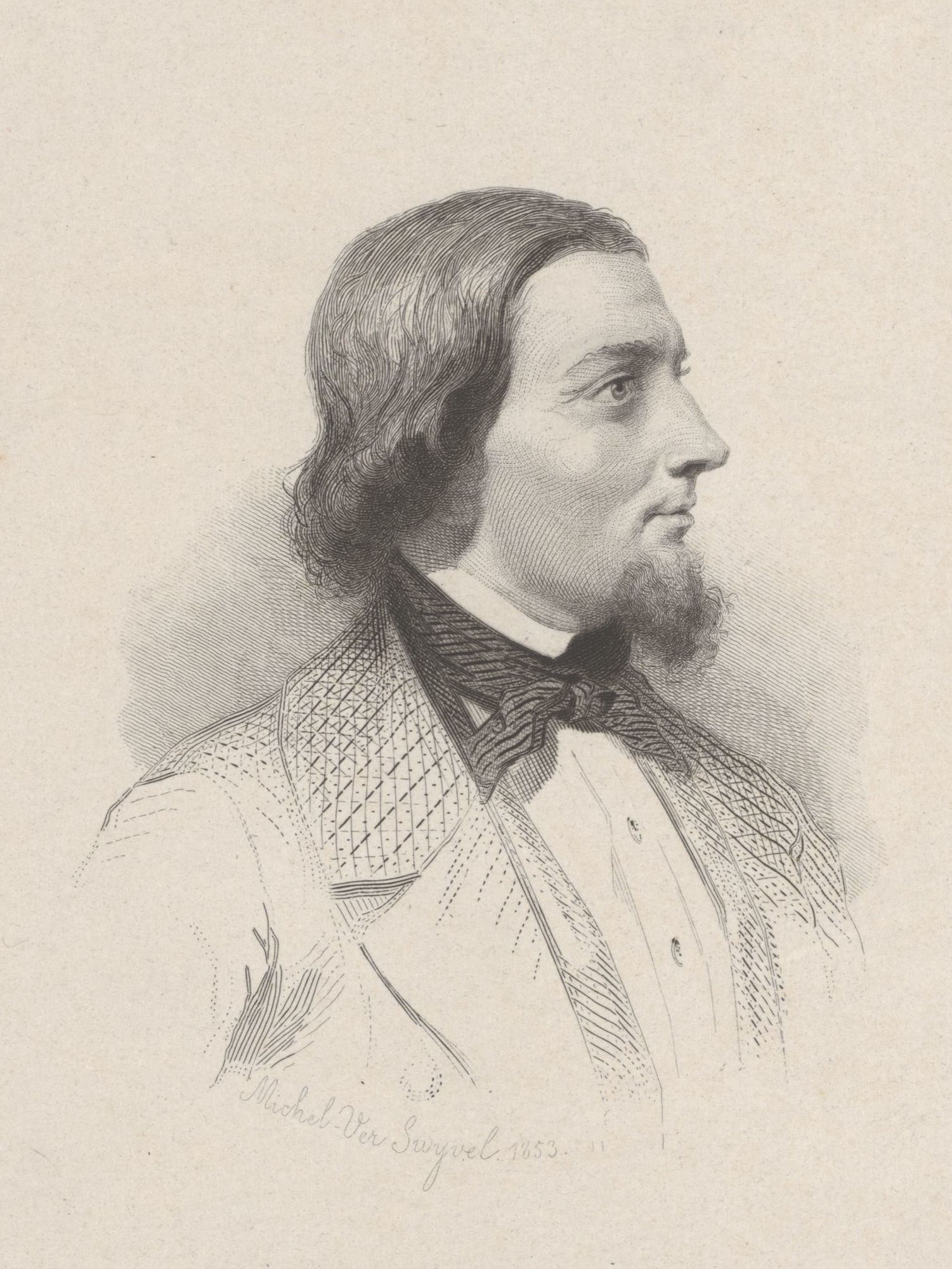
Jan Theodoor van Rijswijck, by Michel Charles Antoine Verswyvel

Jan Theodoor van Rijswijck (Antwerp, 7 July 1811 – Antwerp, 7 May 1849) was a Flemish writer. He was an uncle of the politician Jan Van Rijswijck.

== Biography ==
He did not get much formal education, but his father, a teacher, read the works of Jacob Cats, Joost van den Vondel and other poets to his children. Jan Theodoor van Rijswijck also became a teacher, but being adventurous, he volunteered for the Belgian independence war against the Netherlands in 1830. But the military life did not bode him well, and he obtained permission to leave the army and returned to Antwerp, where he found work as a clerk at a bank.

In the meantime he became a champion of the Flemish movement. He urged Hendrik Conscience to write in Dutch rather than in French, and he himself wrote political and satirical songs. His writings gave him fame as a people's poet and he lived the live of a bohemian. At the end of his life he suffered from the stress of political repressions and he became mentally disturbed. He died in an asylum in Antwerp 1849. In 1864 a statue was erected for him in Antwerp, and a street is named after him, the Jan van Rijswijck laan.

== See also ==
- Flemish literature

== Sources ==
- Jan Theodoor van Rijswijck (Dutch)
- Theodoor van Rijswijck
