= André Parmentier (landscape architect) =

American landscape architect

- Born: 3 July 1780; Enghien, Austrian Netherlands
- Died: 27 November 1830 (aged 50); Brooklyn

André Joseph Ghislain Parmentier, also known as Andrew Parmentier (3 July 1780 in Enghien, Austrian Netherlands – 27 November 1830 in Brooklyn) is one of a generation of American landscape designers who arrived from Europe in the early years after Independence (not to be confused with the French pharmacist and promoter of the potato, Antoine-Augustin Parmentier). Many of these designers, including William Russell Birch and George Isham Parkyns, also practiced landscape depiction, reinforcing the picturesque connection of landscape art as both making and representing places.

He married Sylvie Parmentier (1793–1882) on 3 May 1813 at Tubize, France (now in Belgium).

After some bad business ventures in the Netherlands, and with the help of his brothers, André Parmentier moved to the United States in 1821. He lived in Brooklyn, where he was active in horticulture with a lot of success. One of his creations is a garden of 120.000 m^{2}.

In 1828 he published his "Periodical catalogue of fruit & ornamental trees and shrubs, green-house plants, etc.. Cultivated and for sale at The Horticultural and Botanic Garden of Brooklyn, corner of the Jamaica and Flatbush roads, about 2 miles from the city of New-York" With, a.o., a plan and description of the garden.
