= Provincial Council of Hainaut =

Provincial council in Hainaut, Belgium

Provincial Council of Hainaut Conseil provincial du Hainaut

Type
- Type: Unicameral

History
- Founded: 1831
- Seats: 47-84

The Provincial Council of Hainaut (French: Conseil provincial du Hainaut) is the provincial council for the Belgian province of Hainaut, first introduced under the Constitution of Belgium in 1831. It forms the legislative body of the province. Its 47-84 seats are distributed every six years in provincial elections.

== History ==
The Provincial Council of Hainaut was first constituted in 1831 after the province was incorporated with the Kingdom of Belgium following its declaration of independence from the Netherlands in 1830. Hainaut became one of the nine provinces, each administered by a provincial council. The Provincial Councils, elected for eight years with one-half retiring every four years, met annually.

A six-member standing committee, also known as the Permanent Deputation (French: Députation Permanente) is elected from among the ranks of the Provincial Council as the executive body of the provincial government in Hainaut and presided over by the provincial governor. It functions as the governing authority responsible for executing the decisions made by the Provincial Council and managing the day-to-day administration of the province. In 1917, the Senate of Belgium had 120 seats, 27 filled by Provincial Council elections and 93 by vote of the people, with members serving eight-year terms.

=== Establishments ===
On 21 October 1836, the Hainaut Provincial Council voted to establish the School of Mines And Metallurgy (or Polytechnic Faculty of Mons) (French: Faculté Polytechnique de Mons), with the province being the most industrial section of Belgium. The provincial institution was placed under the administration of the Permanent Delegation by a royal decree of 27 September 1837 and opened on 1 November of that year. The Polytechnic Faculty focused on teaching physics, mineralogy, geometry, mining, mechanics, and civil construction under the supervision of permanent deputations. In 1845, the Provincial Council established the Industrial School of Charleroi. By 1893, four provincial scholarships worth 250 francs each were awarded annually by the Hainaut Provincial Council to students born or living in the province. In 1901, Paul Pastur called upon the Provincial Council to create a higher industrial school, which eventually resulted in the establishment of the Paul Pastur Université du Travail in Charleroi in 1903. The Provincial School and Workshops for the Disabled and Work Accident Victims (French: École provinciale et Ateliers pour Estropiés et Accidentés du Travail) was founded in Charleroi in 1908 by the Provincial Council of Hainaut.

== Current composition ==
The parliamentary assembly of Hainaut, elected every six years with 47 to 84 members, oversees all provincial matters, including internal administration, subsidy rules, police regulations, the budget, and tax collection.
