= Louis Roersch =

Belgian philologist (1831–1891)

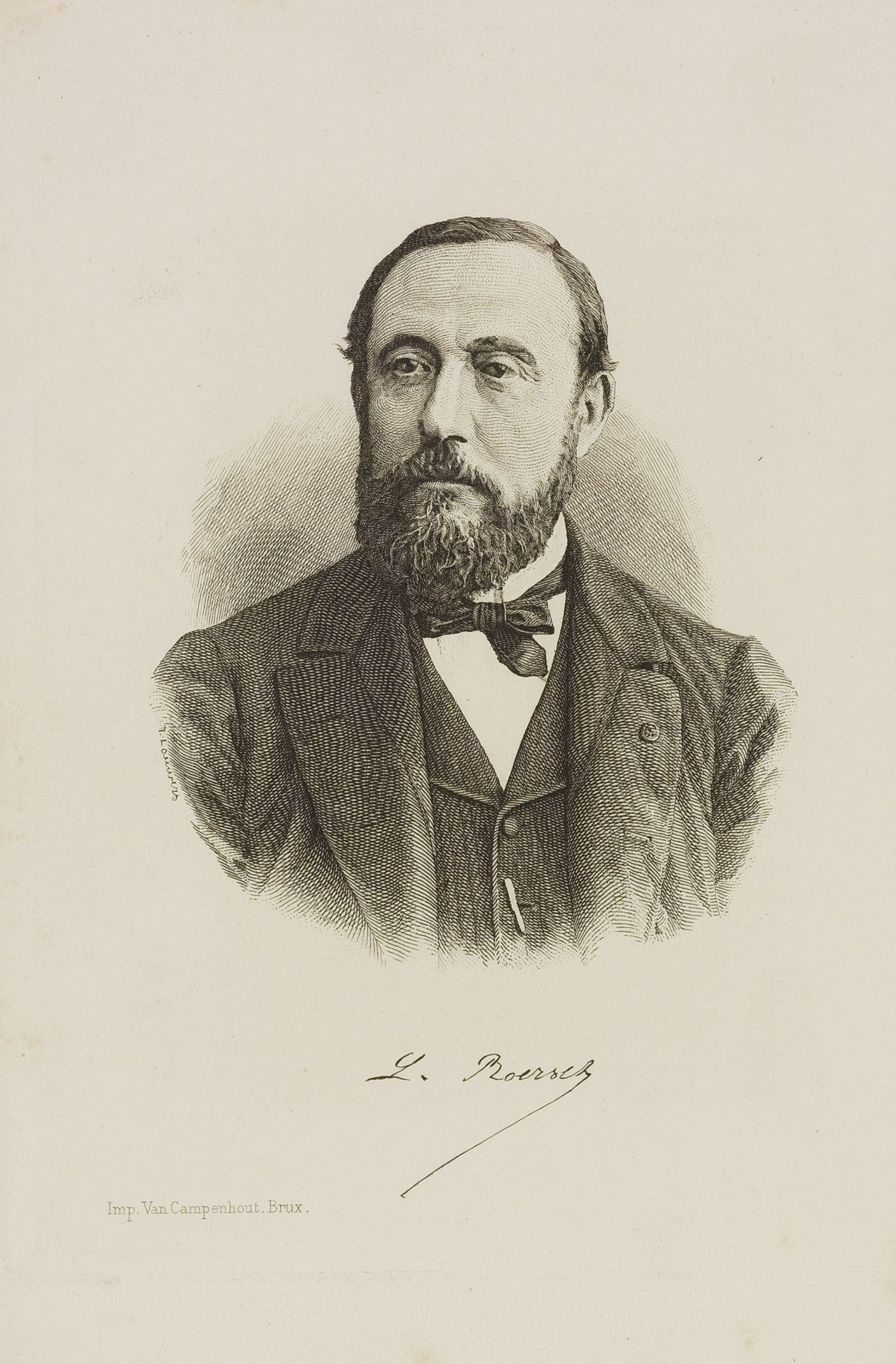
Louis Roersch

Louis Chrétien Roersch (1831–1891) was a Belgian philologist who contributed 26 articles to the Biographie nationale de Belgique.

== Life ==
Roersch was born in Maastricht on 30 May 1831 and was educated at the athenaeum in the city. He went on to study at the Catholic University of Louvain, graduating in philosophy and letters with great distinction on 9 August 1850, and obtaining his doctorate on 19 August 1853. Meanwhile, he had on 15 September 1851 been appointed to teach Latin at the Royal athenaeum of Bruges, where he remained for fourteen years.

On 12 October 1865, he was appointed to teach at the Normal School in Liège, and on 27 September 1872 he was appointed full professor at the Faculty of Philosophy and Letters of the University of Liège. From 1888 to 1891 he served as rector of the university. He became a corresponding member of the Académie royale de Belgique on 8 May 1882, and a full member on 9 May 1887. In 1886 he became one of the founding members of the Koninklijke Vlaamse Academie. In 1884 he joined the editorial committee of the Biographie nationale, to which he contributed 26 articles. He died in Liège on 28 October 1891.

== Publications ==
=== As editor ===
- Cornelius Nepos, De viris illustribus quae supersunt (Liège, 1861; 2nd ed. 1885)
- Julius Caesar, De bello Gallico (Liège, 1864)
- Cicero, Pro Archia et pro rege Dejotaro (Liège, 1867)

=== As author ===
- with Paul Thomas, Éléments de grammaire grecque (1885)
- with J. Delboeuf, Éléments de grammaire française (1885)
