= Le Catholique des Pays-Bas =

Le Catholique des Pays-Bas (Ghent, 1826–1830) was a campaigning newspaper that publicised Catholic grievances regarding the policies pursued by King William I in the United Kingdom of the Netherlands, amplifying the dissatisfaction that led to the Belgian Revolution of 1830.

== Publication history ==
The first issue appeared on 7 November 1826. In April 1830, the editor, Adolphe Bartels, and the publisher, Jean-Baptiste De Nève, were prosecuted for breaches of press law and exiled. Publication continued uninterruptedly during their absence. On 3 October 1830, the newspaper's name was changed to Journal des Flandres.

From December 1826, a thrice-weekly Dutch-language edition appeared in parallel under the title Den Vaderlander.
