= Léopold Harzé =

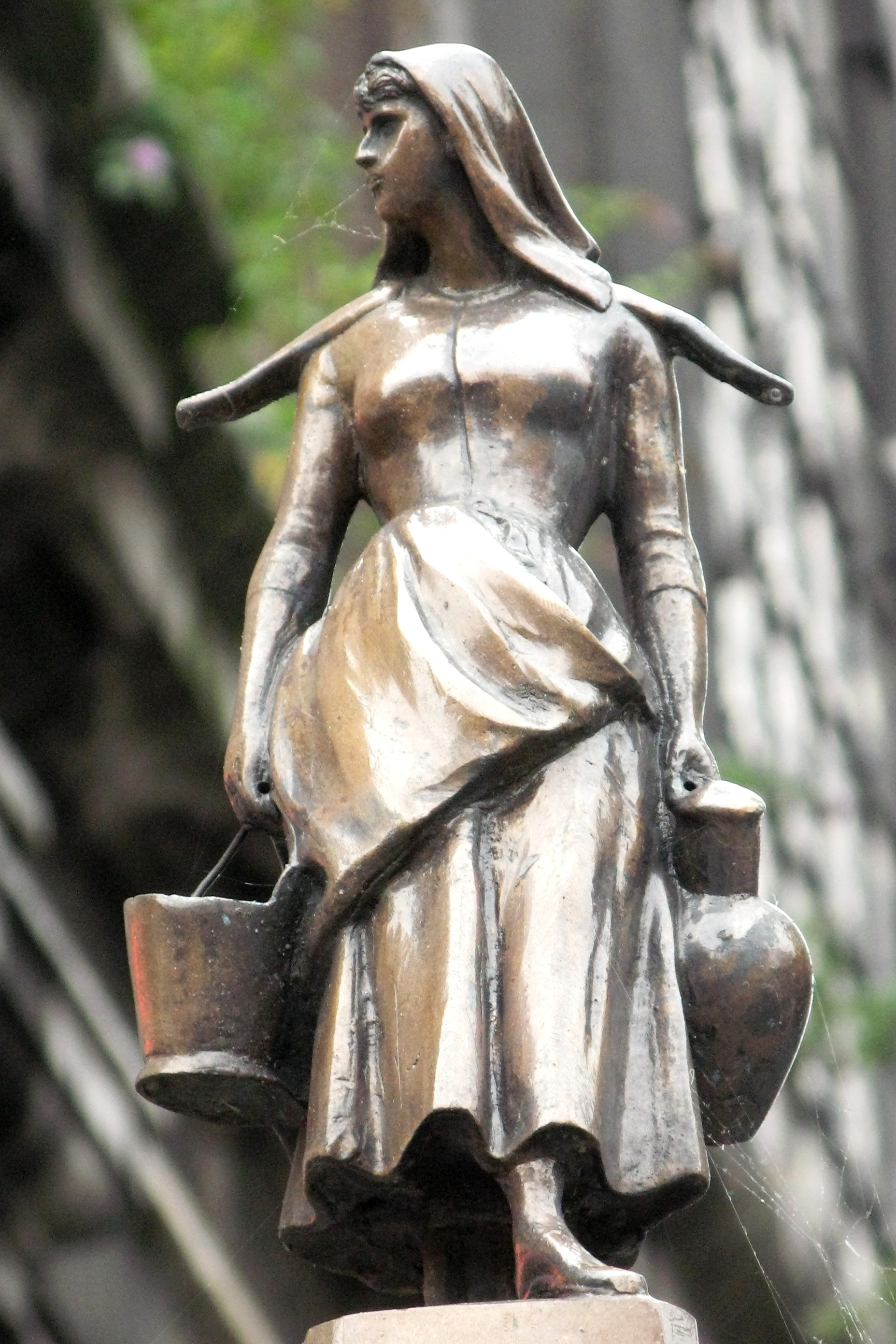
The Water Carrier on the Montefiore En Neuvice Fountain in Liège

Léopold Harzé (1831–1893) was a Belgian sculptor who worked in Brussels. He is well known for his terracotta pieces, but also made patinated bronze sculptures.

== Life ==
Harzé was born in Liège on 29 July 1831, the son of a firearm merchant. He was trained by the sculptor Gerard Buckens. In 1855 he spent time in the studio of Guillaume Geefs, and in 1868 travelled in Italy. He died in Liège on 20 November 1893.

== Career ==
Harzé presented more than a dozen pieces of his work in the 1868 Paris exhibition. George Augustus Henry Sala, one of the famous journalists of the era, commended him highly for his technical skills in depicting different materials and emotions using terracotta and described his work as "the most admirable specimens of purely imitative art that have been seen these thirty years". Some of his works include: "Dorine" (figurine of a young woman in bronze and terracotta from 1877), "The Gossips", "The Quarrelsome Blacksmith", "Neapolitan Gypsy Dance" and "The Bottle". Much of his work is preserved in the Musée de la Vie wallonne in Liège.
