= Coralie van den Cruyce =

Belgian writer, feminist and poet

Coralie Adèle van den Cruyce (1796–1858), in marriage Coralie de Félix de la Motte, was a Belgian writer, feminist and poet.

She was born into an aristocratic family in Paris on 13 October 1796. Among her works are the plays Les orphelins de la grande armée (1834) and Les Violettes (1836). In Bas-bleus, she defended the right of women to express themselves as writers against contemporary criticism. She was married to the noble officer Eugene-Francois-Auguste Pompée de Félix de la Motte and a leading member of Brussels aristocratic life. She died at Geel on 27 June 1858.
