= Charles van Hulthem =

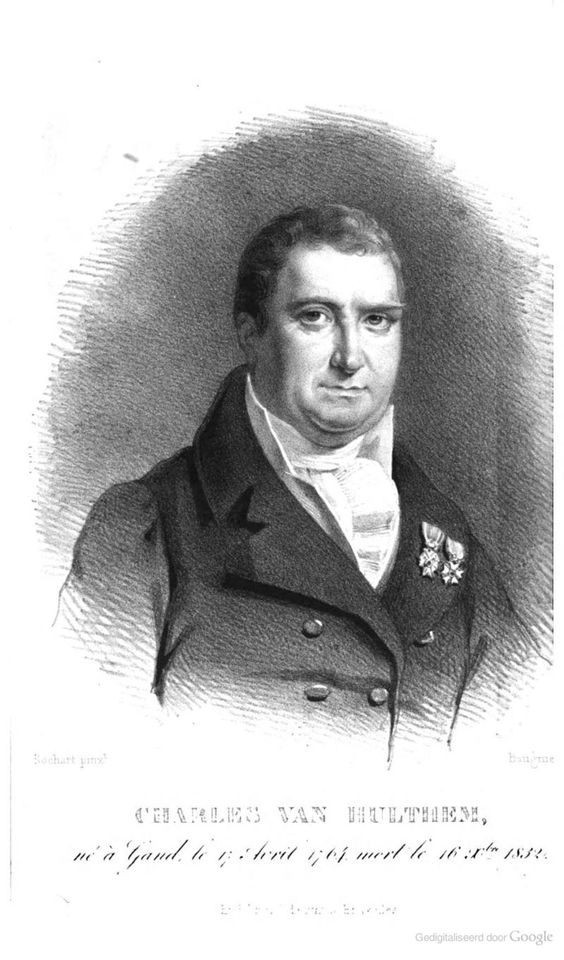
An engraved portrait published in 1836

Charles Joseph Emmanuel van Hulthem (17 April 1764 – 16 December 1832) was a bibliophile from the Low Countries whose collection of books provided the first kernel of the Royal Library of Belgium.

== Life ==
Charles was born in Ghent in the County of Flanders (Austrian Netherlands) on 17 April 1764, the youngest of the nine children of Joseph-François van Hulthem and Isabelle vander Beke. He lost his father when still small, and was educated in the Augustinian College and the Collège Royal in Ghent. After finishing his secondary education he was sent to Lille to be trained in commerce, but after 15 months he begged his uncles to send him to university, and was allowed to matriculate at Leuven University. He graduated Bachelor of Law in 1788. As a student he had spent the vacations travelling to libraries, and had got to know Jean-Noël Paquot, whose manuscripts he would acquire in 1812.

During the Brabant Revolution of 1789 he was elected to Ghent city council, and represented the city on a number of occasions, remaining in public office through the Austrian restoration of 1790 and the French annexation of 1795. In 1792 and again in 1796 he organised exhibitions of contemporary art in the city hall. After the Battle of Fleurus in 1794, he spent two months as a hostage in Amiens. In 1796 he was charged with selecting books and paintings from the religious houses that were being closed down, for the new public library and museum to be established in Saint Peter's Abbey, Ghent. For three years he was a deputy of the Département de l'Escaut in the legislative Council of Five Hundred in Paris, returning to local government thereafter.

Van Hulthem was active on behalf of the botanical garden in Ghent, and promoted the first flower show held there. From 1809 to 1813 he was rector of the academy and the law school in Brussels. In 1811, together with the mayor of Brussels, he set up an art society that held its first salon on 4 November that year. He was an early supporter of the United Kingdom of the Netherlands, proclaimed in 1815, and of Ghent University, founded in 1817. He was elected to the Royal Academy in Brussels on 3 July 1816. He served as secretary from 1816 to 1821. He was also president of the Royal Agricultural and Botanical Society of Ghent.

During the Belgian Revolution of 1830, his house in Brussels was on the front lines and his considerable collection of books, medals and antiquities was severely damaged. He died in Ghent on 16 December 1832.

In 1837, the collection of approximately 60,000 manuscripts and printed books that he had left was acquired by the Belgian state for 315,000 francs and formed the basis of the collection of the Royal Library of Belgium.

== Library ==
- Auguste Voisin, Bibliotheca Hulthemiana ou Catalogue méthodique de la riche et précieuse collection de livres et des manuscrits délaissés par Ch. Van Hulthem, vol. 1: Notice sur Charles van Hulthem. Théologie. Jurisprudence. Sciences et arts (Ghent, J. Poelman, 1836).
- Bibliotheca Hulthemiana ou Catalogue méthodique de la riche et précieuse collection de livres et des manuscrits délaissés par Ch. Van Hulthem, vol. 2: Sciences et arts (suite). Belles-lettres (Ghent, J. Poelman, 1836).
- Bibliotheca Hulthemiana ou Catalogue méthodique de la riche et précieuse collection de livres et des manuscrits délaissés par Ch. Van Hulthem, vol. 3: Histoire (Ghent, J. Poelman, 1836).
- Bibliotheca Hulthemiana ou Catalogue méthodique de la riche et précieuse collection de livres et des manuscrits délaissés par Ch. Van Hulthem, vol. 4: Histoire, sciences, arts et littérature des Pays-Bas (Ghent, J. Poelman, 1836).
- Bibliotheca Hulthemiana ou Catalogue méthodique de la riche et précieuse collection de livres et des manuscrits délaissés par Ch. Van Hulthem, vol. 5: Supplément (Ghent, J. Poelman, 1837).
