= Adolphe Bartels =

Belgian liberal, journalist and writer

Adolphe Bartels (1802–1862) was a Belgian liberal, journalist and writer, notable for supporting the Belgian Revolution of 1830. He wrote two historical accounts of the Revolution, in 1834 and 1836 respectively. He also edited Radical, the liberal movement's official journal from 1837 to 1838.

== Works ==
- Les Flandres et la révolution belge
- Documens historiques sur la révolution belge
