= Paelinck =

Paelinck is a surname mainly occurring in Belgium. Notable people with the surname include:

- Fanny Paelinck-Horgnies (1805–1887), Belgian painter
- Jean Paelinck (1930–2025), Belgian economist
- Jean Paelinck (administrator) (1906–1961), Belgian colonial administrator
- Joseph Paelinck (1781–1839), Flemish painter
