= Belgian Revolution =

1830 revolution against Dutch rule

- Part of the Revolutions of 1830
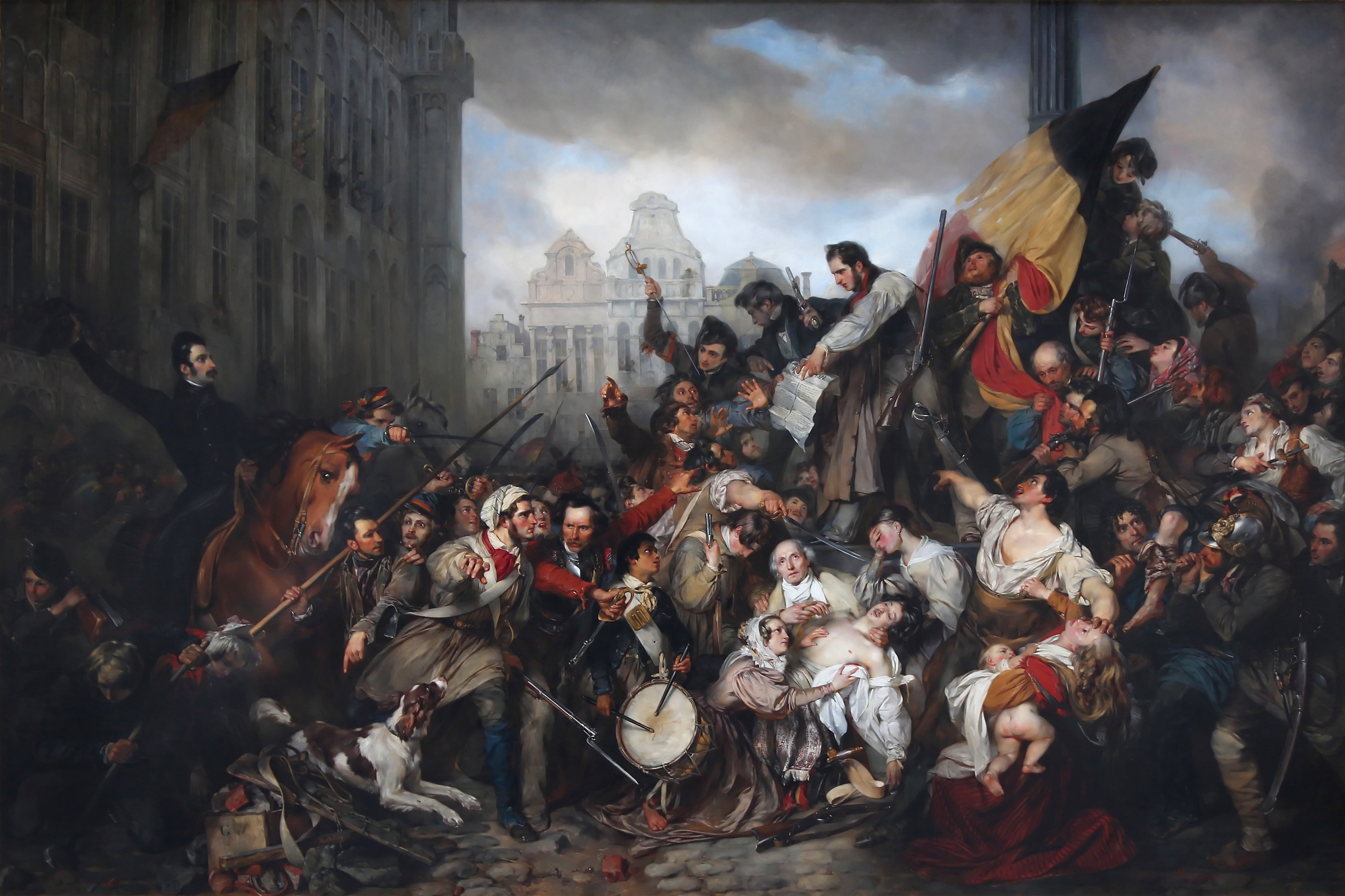
- Episode of the Belgian Revolution of 1830, Gustaaf Wappers
| Date | 25 August 1830 – 21 July 1831 (10 months, 3 weeks and 5 days) |
| Location | The Low Countries |
| Result | Franco-Belgian victory Treaty of London |
| Territorial changes | Most European powers' recognition of Belgium's independence from the Kingdom of the Netherlands |

Belligerents
| Belgian rebels; France (from 1831) | Netherlands |

Commanders and leaders
| Charles Rogier; Erasme de Chokier; Étienne Maurice Gérard | William I; Prince William; Prince Frederick |

Strength
| Belgium: 60,000; France: 70,000 men | 50,000 |

The Belgian Revolution (French: Révolution belge, Dutch: Belgische Revolutie/opstand/omwenteling) was a conflict which led to the secession of the southern provinces (mainly the former Southern Netherlands) from the United Kingdom of the Netherlands and the establishment of an independent Kingdom of Belgium.

The people of the south were mainly Flemings and Walloons. Both peoples were traditionally Catholic as contrasted with Protestant-dominated (Dutch Reformed) people of the north. Many outspoken liberals regarded King William I's rule as despotic. There were high levels of unemployment and industrial unrest among the working classes.

On 25 August 1830, riots erupted in Brussels and shops were looted. Theatregoers who had just watched the nationalistic opera La muette de Portici joined the mob. Uprisings followed elsewhere in the country. Factories were occupied and machinery destroyed. Order was restored briefly after William committed troops to the Southern Provinces but rioting continued and leadership was taken up by radicals, who started talking of secession.

Dutch units saw mass desertion of recruits from the southern provinces and pulled out. On 27 September, a newly formed Provisional Government in Brussels declared independence and called for the election of a National Congress. King William refrained from future military action and appealed to the Great Powers. The resulting 1830 London Conference of major European powers recognised Belgian independence. Following the installation of Leopold I as King of the Belgians in 1831, King William made a belated attempt to reconquer Belgium and restore his position through a military campaign. This Ten Days' Campaign failed because of French military intervention. The Dutch accepted the decision of the London conference and Belgian independence in 1839 by signing the Treaty of London.

== United Kingdom of the Netherlands ==
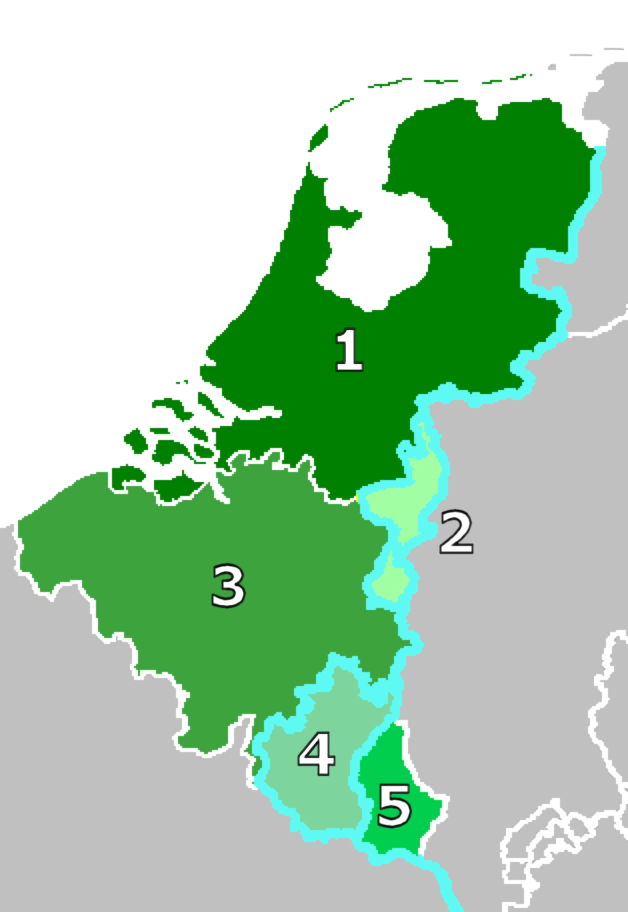
The Netherlands, Belgium, Luxembourg and Limburg in 1839 1, 2 and 3 United Kingdom of the Netherlands (until 1830) 1 and 2 Kingdom of the Netherlands (after 1839) 2 Duchy of Limburg (1839–1867) (in the German Confederacy after 1839 as compensation for Waals-Luxemburg) 3 and 4 Kingdom of Belgium (after 1839) 4 and 5 Grand Duchy of Luxembourg (borders until 1839) 4 Province of Luxembourg (Waals-Luxemburg, to Belgium in 1839) 5 Grand Duchy of Luxembourg (German Luxemburg; borders after 1839) In blue, the borders of the German Confederation.

After the defeat of Napoleon at the Battle of Waterloo in 1815, the Congress of Vienna created a kingdom for the House of Orange-Nassau, thus combining the United Provinces of the Netherlands with the former Austrian Netherlands to create a strong buffer state north of France; with the addition of those provinces the Netherlands became a rising power. When the United Kingdom insisted on retaining the former Dutch Ceylon and the Cape Colony, which it had seized while the Netherlands was ruled by Napoleon, the new Kingdom of the Netherlands was compensated with these southern provinces.

== Causes of the revolution ==
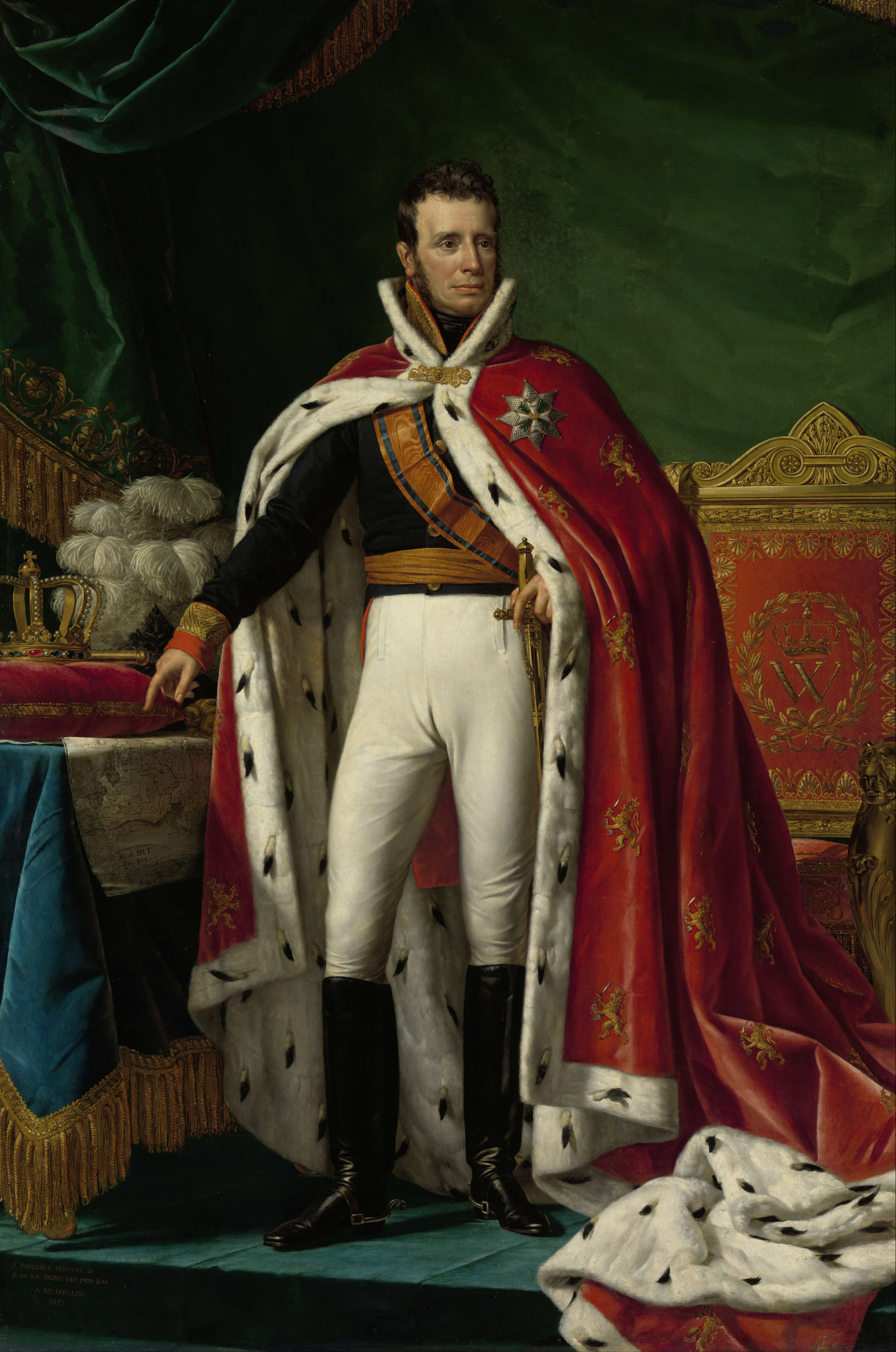
Portrait of William I by Joseph Paelinck, 1819

The revolution was due to a combination of factors, the main one being the difference of religion (Catholic in today's Belgium, Protestant in today's Netherlands) and the general lack of autonomy given to the south.

Other important factors are

- The under-representation of today's Belgians in the General Assembly (62% of the population for 50% of the seats)
- Most of the institutions were based in the North and public burdens were unevenly distributed. Only one minister out of four was Belgian. There were four times as many Dutch people in the administration as Belgians. There was a general domination of the Dutch over the economic, political, and social institutions of the Kingdom;
- The public debt of the north (higher than that of the south) had to be supported by the south as well. The original debts were initially of 1.25 billion guilders for the United Provinces and only 100 million for the South.
- The action of William I in the field of education (construction of schools, control of the competence of teachers and the creation of new establishments, creation of three State universities) placed it under the total control of the State, which displeased Catholic opinion.
- The contingent imposed on Belgium by the recruitment of militiamen was proportionally high, while the proportion of Belgians among the officers was low, the high staff being mainly composed of former officers of the French army or of the British army. Only one officer out of six would be from the South. Most Belgian soldiers were therefore commanded by officers who were not originally from the Southern Netherlands. Moreover, the Dutch language had become the sole language of the army of the United Kingdom of the Netherlands in 1823/24, which was an additional grievance on the part of the francophone elites and the Walloon people who spoke Romance dialects and languages.
- The unsatisfactory application of freedom of the press and freedom of assembly were considered by Belgian intellectuals as a means of control of the South by the North.
- Belgian merchants and industrialists complained about the free trade policy pursued from 1827 onwards. The separation of France had caused the industry of the South to lose a large part of its turnover. On the other hand, the colony of the East Indies was experiencing a long period of revolt and British products were competing with Belgian production. With the end of the continental blockade, the continent was invaded by cheap British products, appreciated by the North, still mainly agricultural, but which excluded the productions of the South.
- A linguistic reform in 1823 was intended to make Dutch the official language in the Flemish provinces. This reform was met with strong opposition from the upper classes who at the time were mostly French-speaking, whether they came from Flanders or Wallonia, but also from the Flemish speakers themselves, who at the time did not speak standard Dutch but their own dialects. On 4 June 1830, this reform was abolished.
- The conservatives in the northern Netherlands were pushing for only followers of the former (Protestant) State Church to be appointed to the government, while the Belgian conservatives wanted to re-establish Catholicism as the state religion in Belgium. The coexistence of two state religions throughout the kingdom was unacceptable to both sides. Until 1821 the government used the opposition of the Catholics to the Basic Law to maintain the Protestant character of the state apparatus through the appointment of civil servants. William I himself was a supporter of the German Lutheran tradition, according to which the sovereign is the head of the church. He wanted to counter the Pope's authority over the Catholic Church by being able to influence the appointment of bishops.

== "Night at the opera" ==
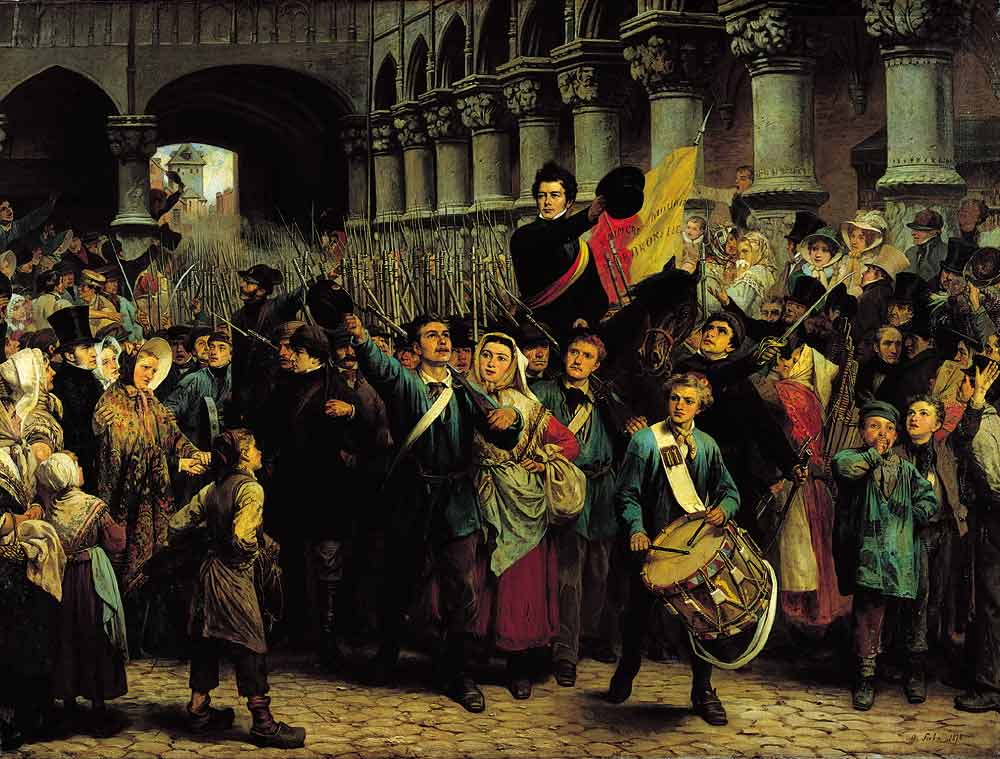
Charles Rogier leads the 250 revolutionary volunteers from Liège to Brussels (Charles Soubre, 1878)

Catholic partisans watched with excitement the unfolding of the July Revolution in France, details of which were swiftly reported in the newspapers. On 25 August 1830, at the Théâtre Royal de la Monnaie in Brussels, an uprising followed a special performance, in honor of William I's birthday, of Daniel Auber's La Muette de Portici (The Mute Girl of Portici), a sentimental and patriotic opera set against Masaniello's uprising against the Spanish masters of Naples in the 17th century. After the duet, "Amour sacré de la patrie" (Sacred love of Fatherland), with Adolphe Nourrit in the tenor role, many audience members left the theater and joined the riots which had already begun. The crowd poured into the streets shouting patriotic slogans. The brawls and violence continued for several days, with protesters capturing key points in the city including the Parc de Bruxelles and the Palais de Bruxelles. The Belgian rebels began to organize and fortify their positions in preparation for further confrontations with Dutch forces. The following days saw an explosion of the desperate and exasperated proletariat of Brussels, who rallied around the newly created flag of the Brussels independence movement which was fastened to a standard with shoelaces during a street fight and used to lead a counter-charge against the forces of Prince William.

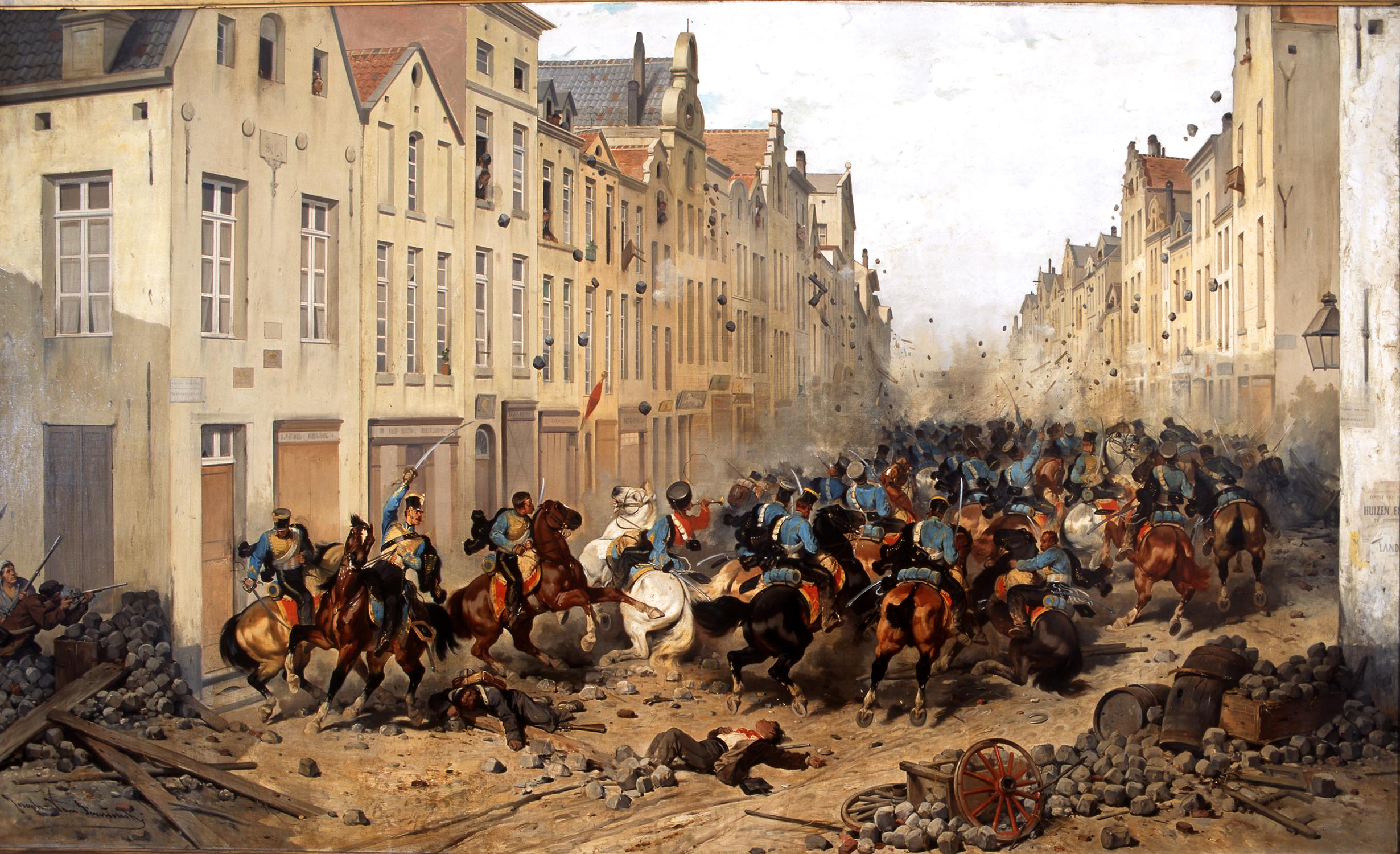
Retreat of the Dutch cavalry on the Vlaamsesteenweg in Brussels, 1830

William I sent his two sons, Crown-Prince William and Prince Frederik to quell the riots. William was asked by the Burghers of Brussels to come to the town alone, with no troops, for a meeting; this he did, despite the risks. The affable and moderate Crown Prince William, who represented the monarchy in Brussels, was convinced by the Estates-General on 1 September that the administrative separation of north and south was the only viable solution to the crisis. His father rejected the terms of accommodation that Prince William proposed. King William I attempted to restore the established order by force, but the 8,000 Dutch troops under Prince Frederik were unable to retake Brussels in bloody street fighting (23–26 September). The army was withdrawn to the fortresses of Maastricht, Venlo, and Antwerp, and when the Northern commander of Antwerp bombarded the town, claiming a breach of a ceasefire, the whole of the Southern provinces was incensed. Any opportunity to quell the breach was lost on 26 September when a National Congress was summoned to draw up a Constitution and the Provisional Government was established under Charles Latour Rogier. The Provisional Government then issued a Declaration of Independence on 4 October 1830.

== The European powers and an independent Belgium ==
On 20 December 1830 the London Conference of 1830 brought together five major European powers: Austria, the United Kingdom, France, Prussia and Russia. At first, the European powers were divided over the Belgian cry for independence. The Napoleonic Wars were still fresh in the memories of the major European powers, so once the French, under the recently installed July Monarchy, supported Belgian independence, the other European powers unsurprisingly supported the continued union of the provinces of the Netherlands. Russia, Prussia, Austria, and the United Kingdom all supported the Netherlands, since they feared that the French would eventually annex an independent Belgium (particularly the British: see Flahaut partition plan for Belgium). However, in the end, none of the European powers sent troops to aid the Dutch government, partly because of rebellions within some of their own borders (the Russians were occupied with the November Uprising in Poland and Prussia was saddled with war debt). Britain would come to see the benefits of isolating France geographically with the new creation of a new Belgian buffer state between France, the Netherlands and Prussia.

== Accession of King Leopold ==
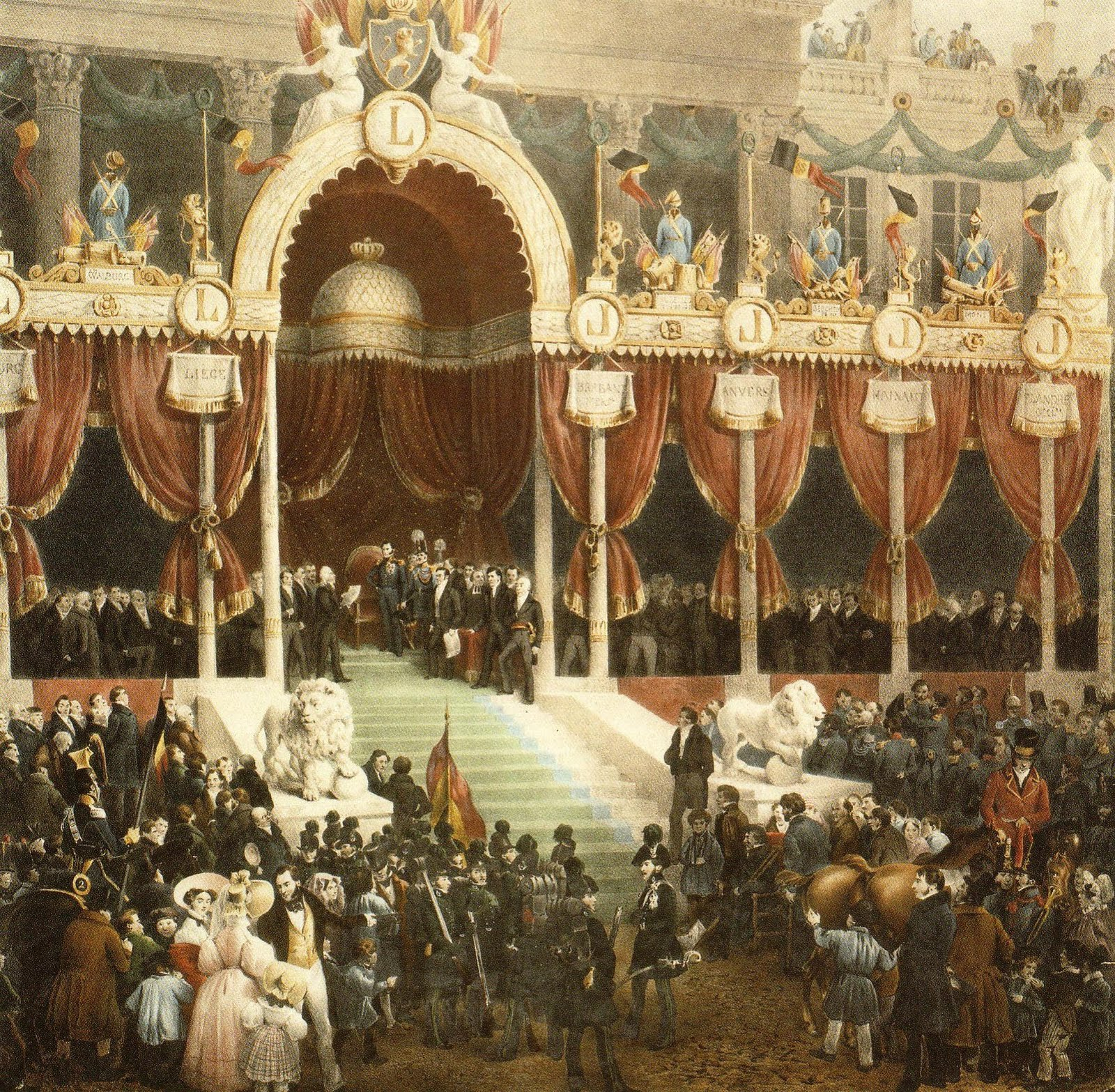
Leopold taking the constitutional oath (Gustaaf Wappers, 1831)

In November 1830, the National Congress of Belgium was established to create a constitution for the new state. The Congress decided that Belgium would be a popular, constitutional monarchy. On 7 February 1831, the Belgian Constitution was proclaimed. However, no actual monarch yet sat on the throne.

The Congress refused to consider any candidate from the Dutch ruling house of Orange-Nassau. Eventually the Congress drew up a shortlist of three candidates, all of whom were French. This itself led to political opposition, and Leopold of Saxe-Coburg, who had been considered at an early stage but dropped due to French opposition, was proposed again. On 22 April 1831, Leopold was approached by a Belgian delegation at Marlborough House to officially offer him the throne. At first reluctant to accept, he eventually took up the offer, and after an enthusiastic popular welcome on his way to Brussels, Leopold I of Belgium took his oath as king on 21 July 1831.

21 July is generally used to mark the end of the revolution and the start of the Kingdom of Belgium. It is celebrated each year as Belgian National Day.

== Post-independence ==
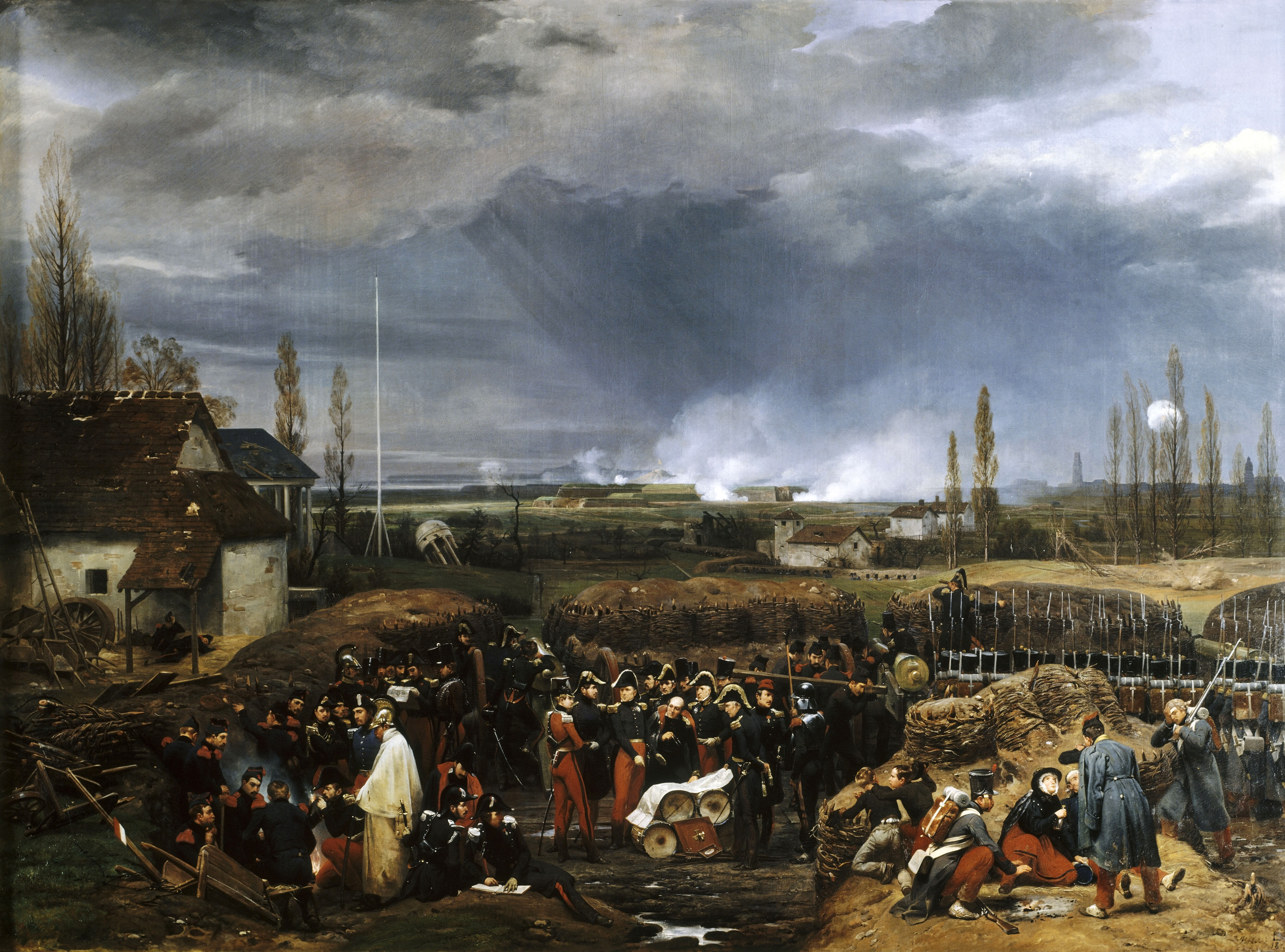
The Siege of Antwerp by Horace Vernet

=== Ten Days' Campaign ===
King William was not satisfied with the settlement drawn up in London and did not accept Belgium's claim of independence: it divided his kingdom and drastically affected his Treasury. On 2 August 1831 the Dutch army, headed by the Dutch princes, invaded Belgium, in what became known as the "Ten Days' Campaign". On 4 August the Dutch force took control of Antwerp and moved deeper into Belgium. The Belgian army of the Meuse was defeated in the battle of Hasselt. On 8 August Leopold called for support from the French and the British. As a result Marshal Étienne Maurice Gérard crossed the border with 70,000 French troops under his command on 9 August.

The battle of Leuven (where King Leopold had placed his headquarters) began on 12 August. In order to avoid war with the approaching French the Dutch agreed to an armistice with Belgium and withdrew after briefly taking control of the city. While the victorious initial campaign gave the Dutch an advantageous position in subsequent negotiations, the Dutch were compelled to agree to an indefinite armistice, although they continued to hold the Antwerp Citadel and occasionally bombarded the city from it. Gerard returned to Belgium in November 1832 with the Armée du Nord and besieged the citadel taking it on 23 December 1832. William I would refuse to recognize a Belgian state until April 1839, when he had to yield under pressure by the Treaty of London and reluctantly recognized a border which, with the exception of Limburg and Luxembourg, was basically the border of 1790.

=== 1839 Treaty of London ===
On 19 April 1839 the Treaty of London signed by the European powers (including the Netherlands) recognized Belgium as an independent and neutral country comprising West Flanders, East Flanders, Brabant, Antwerp, Hainaut, Namur, and Liège, as well as half of Luxembourg and Limburg. The Dutch army, however, held onto Maastricht, and as a result, the Netherlands kept the eastern half of Limburg and its large coalfields.

Germany broke the treaty in 1914 when it invaded Belgium on 4 August and dismissed British protests over a "scrap of paper". Britain declared war on Germany the same day.

=== Orangism ===
As early as 1830 a movement started for the reunification of Belgium and the Netherlands, called Orangism (after the Dutch royal colour of orange), which was active in Flanders and Brussels. But industrial cities, like Liège, also had a strong Orangist faction. The movement met with strong disapproval from the authorities. Between 1831 and 1834, 32 incidents of violence against Orangists were mentioned in the press and in 1834 Minister of Justice Lebeau banned expressions of Orangism in the public sphere, enforced with heavy penalties.

== Anniversary remembrances ==
=== Cinquantenaire (50th anniversary) ===
The golden jubilee of independence set up the Cinquantenaire park complex in Brussels.

=== 175th anniversary commemoration ===
In 2005, the Belgian revolution of 1830 was depicted in one of the highest value Belgian coins ever minted, the 100 euro "175 Years of Belgium" coin. The obverse depicts a detail from Wappers' painting Scene of the September Days in 1830.

== See also ==
- History of Belgium
- Jan van Speyk
- Unionism in Belgium
- Luxembourg and the Belgian Revolution

== Bibliography ==
- Fishman, J. S. (1971). "The London Conference of 1830". Tijdschrift voor Geschiedenis. 84 (3): 418–428.
- Fishman, J. S. (1988). Diplomacy and Revolution: The London Conference of 1830 and the Belgian Revolt. Amsterdam: CHEV. ISBN 978-90-5068-003-5.
- Kossmann, E. H. (1978). The Low Countries 1780-1940. Oxford [Eng.] : New York: Clarendon Press. pp. 151–160. ISBN 978-0-19-822108-1.
- Kossmann-Putto, Johanna Adriana; Kossmann, Ernst Heinrich (1987). The Low Countries: History of the Northern and Southern Netherlands (3rd ed.). Rekkem: Stichting ons erdfeel. ISBN 978-90-70831-20-2.
- Omond, G. W. T. (1919). "The Question of the Netherlands in 1829–1830". Transactions of the Royal Historical Society. 2: 150–171. doi:10.2307/3678256. ISSN 0080-4401. JSTOR 3678256.
- Pirenne, Henri (1948). Histoire de Belgique (in French). Vol. VII: De la Révolution de 1830 à la Guerre de 1914 (2nd ed.). Brussels: Maurice Lamertin.
- Schroeder, Paul W. (1994). The Transformation of European Politics 1763–1848. Oxford: Clarendon Press. pp. 671–691. ISBN 978-0-19-159106-8.
- Stallaerts, Robert (2010). The A to Z of Belgium. Lanham (Md.): Scarecrow Press. ISBN 978-0-8108-7201-1.
- Witte, Els; et al. (2009). Political History of Belgium: From 1830 Onwards. Asp / Vubpress / Upa. pp. 21ff. ISBN 978-9054875178.
