= Fanny Paelinck-Horgnies =

Belgian painter

Fanny Paelinck-Horgnies (1 May 1805 – 9 February 1887) was a Belgian painter of German origin, known for her works in religious painting, portraiture, history painting, genre scenes and mythological scenes. Her style can be compared to neo-classicism.

== Life ==
Louise Thérèse Françoise Élisabeth Horgnies was born in Regensburg on 1 May 1805. Fanny Horgnies worked in Brussels. Her paintings fall mainly under history paintings, religious scenes and genre scenes, but later she also focused on romantic subjects.

Her career as a painter began around 1820 as a student of Joseph Paelinck, whom she married in Brussels on 15 October 1827. According to the art historian and artist Alexia Creusen, her marriage did not put an end to her artistic career, unlike the majority of woman painters of her time.

Paelinck-Horgnies summarized her career as an artist as follows in a letter addressed to A.P. Sunaert, the compiler of the Ghent museum catalog: "My brief career as an artist has been so mediocre, that it is really impossible that you would want to know the name of the author who sends one of my paintings: I would be very grateful if you would not mention me in a catalog, be, by all means, infinitely grateful to you for the honor you have bestowed on me in this circumstance."

She died in Brussels on 9 February 1887.

== Work ==
In the 19th century, art exhibitions were a common phenomenon, originating in Paris and its famous Salon of Painting and Sculpture in which artists could compete to increase their reputation and prestige.

The Prix des dames was a competition created specifically for women artists at the occasion of the Salon of Ghent created for artist born or living in the Kingdom of Netherlands.

Fanny Paelinck-Horgnies participated in the 1826 edition of the Salon of Ghent. She competed for the Ladys' prize (Le Prix des Dames) who had the following theme "A nymph from Diana's suitewalked into a forest, succumbing to fatigue she fell asleep, his dog watching by his side". She participated with the painting "A lost nymph from Diana's suite" but the winner of the 1826 edition was Elisa de Gamond.

=== Santa Cecilia ===
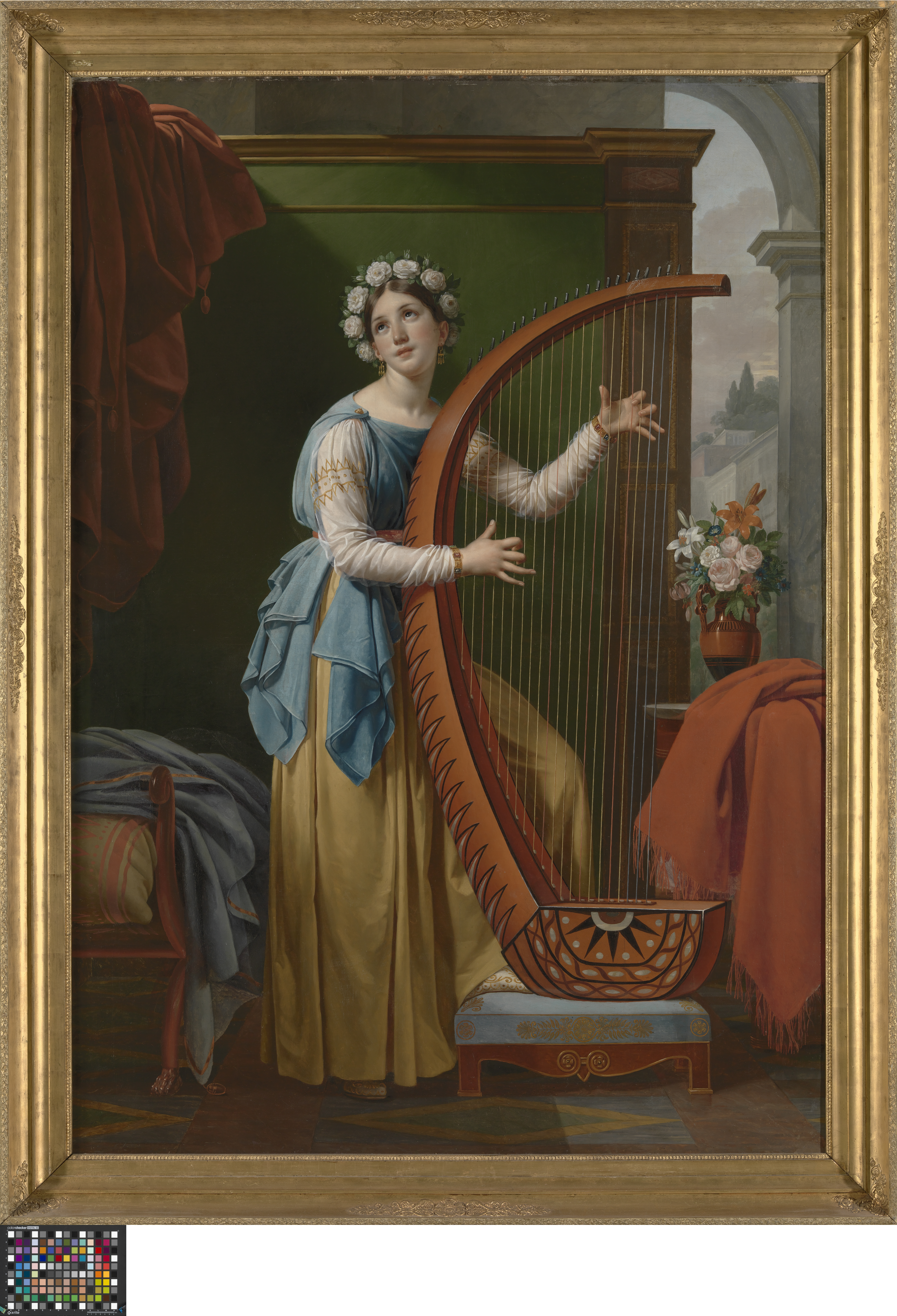
Saint Cecilia (1829) by Fanny Paelinck-Horgnies (Royal Museum of Fine Arts, Ghent), 1829-C. Oil on canvas: 222.3cm x 156cm

The theme of the 1829 Prix des dames was the Christian martyr Saint Cecilia, a popular theme in neoclassical painting, and it was worded as follows: "Saint Cecilia singing the praises of the Lord, accompanying herself on the harp". Paelinck-Horgnies won the prize with her painting "The Holy Cecilia".

Since the late Middle Ages, Santa Cecilia has also been considered a patroness of music. She is usually depicted with a hand organ. In the painting by Paelinck-Horgnies, she plays the harp. Because of its theme, smooth painting, static composition and even light, this work of art belongs to the neoclassical painting.

The result made an impression on the contemporaries, as is shown in an article in the Gazette van Gend(t): "Honneur aux dames, is my motto, therefore I shall break with the order of the program to occupy myself first with the works of a gender, which is all the more suited to the exercise of the fine arts, since the sparrows are of their skill... Although the three ladies, who have had the courage to present us with Saint Cecilia, are not Raphaels nor even Rubens, they have nevertheless shown us dry beautiful scenes, which proudly adorn our showroom and in which the merits far exceed the deficient. Glory be to them that their pure pencil has not produced any errors, as happened with Flora and the domestic scenes, and that they have produced pieces that add lustre to the Flemish school."

=== Graziella ===
Another notable worf of Paelinck-Horgnies is Graziella, an undated rendering of the character of Alphonse de Lamartine's 1852 novel Graziella. This novel is based on a true encounter between the author and an Italian girl, in which the author paints a picture in his title character of how the ideal woman should look and behave. Graziella, a simple fisherman's daughter, is uncultivated and very close to nature. Lamartine described her as an instinctive and passionate person. The cliché of the dark, Italian peasant girl exuding great joie de vivre was thus brought to life. Paelinck-Horgnies depicted her traditionally, sitting at the water's edge, under the foliage of an overhanging tree branch. This link with the sea and the outdoors was to emphasize her natural beauty.

== Bibliography ==
- Van der Stighelen, Katlijne, ed. (1999). Elck zijn waerom : vrouwelijke kunstenaars in België en Nederland, 1500–1950. Ludion. ISBN 90-5544-271-2. OCLC 901413817.
