= Zoé de Gamond =

Belgian educator and feminist (1806–1854)

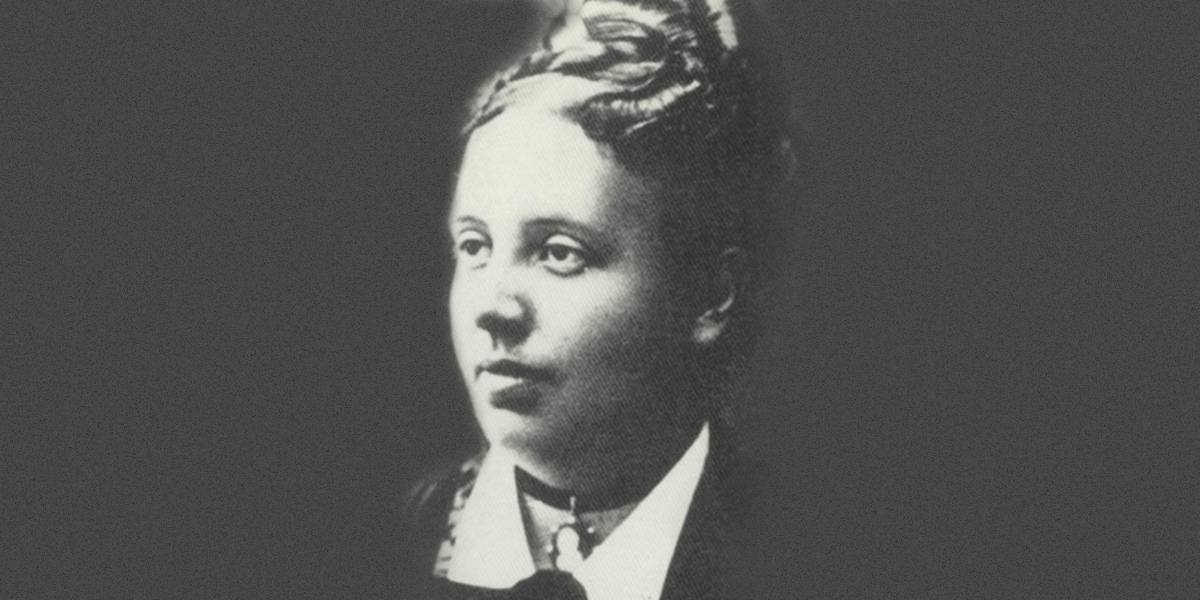
Zoé de Gamond.

Zoé Charlotte de Gamond (11 February 1806 – 28 February 1854) was a Belgian educator and feminist who sometimes wrote under the pseudonym Marie de G***.

== Life ==
Zoé de Gamond was born in Brussels into a wealthy liberal family. Her father, Pierre-Joseph de Gamond, was a lawyer and professor after 1830 in the independent Kingdom of Belgium. Her mother, Elisabeth-Angélique de Ladoz, was of noble origin and held regular salons through which Zoé became active in politics.

Originally, together with her friend Julie du Bosch, a partisan of Saint-Simon, she later abandoned his ideas for those of the utopian socialist Charles Fourier. In the early 1830s she was active in supporting Italian and Polish political exiles. It was at this time that she met Polish nationalist Jan Czyński, with whom she wrote Le Roi des Paysans. She also produced writings on feminism in the mid-1830s. On 18 March 1835 she married the Italian artist Jean-Baptiste Gatti, thereafter often using the name "Gatti de Gamond".

She and her sister Élisa de Gamond held salons, learning about politics at a time when women were excluded, notably by participating in the salons held by their mother. This beginning of political life was in line with the revolutionary events of 1830. Later, the two sisters held salons twice a week, as their mother had done in the past.

In the late 1830s the Gattis left Brussels for Paris, where Zoé wrote a successful work, reprinted five times and translated into English, on Fourier's philosophy. With the support of two wealthy English Fourierists, the Gattis established a phalanstère at Cîteaux in 1842. This proved to be a financial disaster for them, and they returned to Brussels and a life of relative poverty. In the 1840s, Zoé wrote two novels, Fièvres de l'âme (1844) and Le Monde enviable (1846), as well as an overview of biblical history for use in schools, Abrégé de l'histoire sainte (1848).

On 21 June 1847, Zoé was appointed inspector of girls' schools for the city of Brussels. She published several educational manuals, along with a guide to running a nursery school.

She died in 1854, aged only 48, leaving two young daughters who also went on to become educationalists, Marie and Isabelle, the latter also a noted Belgian feminist.

== Select bibliography ==
- De la condition sociale des femmes au dix-neuvième siècle (1834)
- Des devoirs des femmes et des moyens les plus propres d'assurer leur bonheur (1836)
- (with Jan Czyński) Le Roi des Paysans (1838)
- Fourier et son système (1838)
  - Fourier and His System (1842)
- Réalisation d'une commune sociétaire d'après la théorie de Charles Fourier (1840)
  - The Phalanstery; or, Attractive industry and moral harmony (1841)
