= Julie du Bosch =

Belgian social reformer (1797–1847)

- Born: 13 February 1797; Ghent, Belgium
- Died: 4 April 1847 (aged 50); Ghent, Belgium
- Occupation: Social reformer
- Spouse: Nicolas De Keyser
- Children: None
- Parents: Grégoire du Bosch (father); Coleta Sunaert (mother)

Julie du Bosch (1797–1847) was a Belgian social reformer who, together with her friend Zoé de Gamond, from 1831 publicized Saint-Simonianism (a political and economic ideology founded by Henri de Saint-Simon) in the newly founded Kingdom of Belgium.

Julie was born in Ghent on 13 February 1797 to a wealthy family, her parents being Coleta Sunaert and Grégoire du Bosch. In 1834 she married Nicolas De Keyser. They never had children, and she devoted her time to researching and writing on social issues. She died in Ghent on 4 April 1847.

== External sources ==
- Gubin, É., Piette, V., & Jacques, C. (1997). Les féminismes belges et français de 1830 à 1914 Une approche comparée. Le Mouvement Social, 178, 36–68. https://doi.org/10.2307/3779562
