= London Conference of 1830 =

Meeting leading to Belgian independence

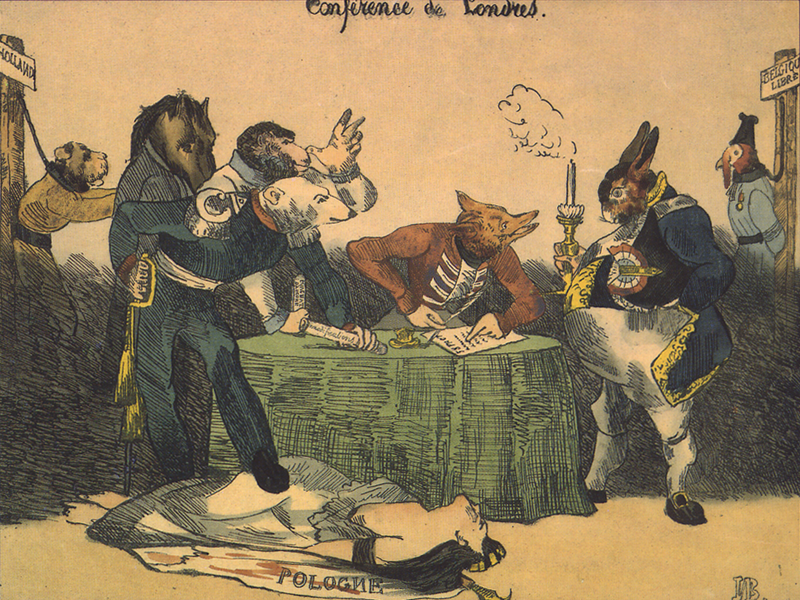
Lithograph on the London conference of 1830 by Honoré Daumier. Figures representing Prussia, Austria, Russia, Great Britain and France are shown discussing a text, while the Netherlands and Belgium are hanging on the side and Poland is lying dead on the ground.

The London Conference of 1830 brought together representatives of the five major European powers Austria, Britain, France, Prussia and Russia. At the conference, which began on 20 December, they recognised the success of the Belgian secession from the United Kingdom of the Netherlands and permanently guaranteed Belgian independence.

== Dutch response ==
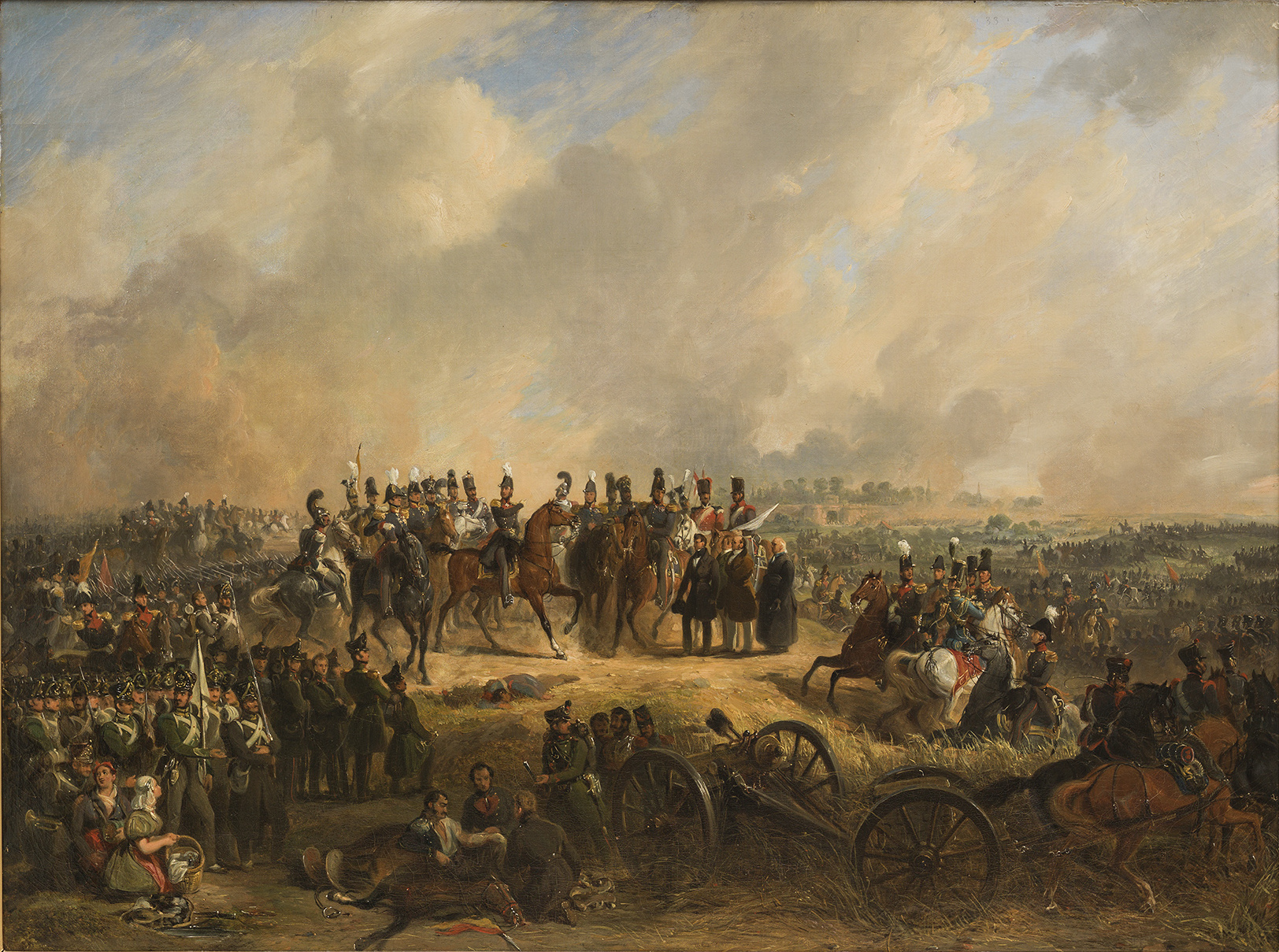
The Battle of Hasselt by Jan Willem Pieneman

The Dutch were strongly opposed to Belgian independence, launching an unsuccessful invasion in 1831. Not until 1839 did the Dutch accept the decision of the London Conference and recognise Belgian independence.

== Winners and losers ==
Fishman says that the London Conference was "an extraordinarily successful conference" because it "provided the institutional framework through which the leading powers of the time safeguarded the peace of Europe". G. M. Trevelyan from a British standpoint called it "one of the most beneficent and difficult feats ever accomplished by our diplomacy"; while the French too saw their goal of an independent Belgium, which was peacefully accepted by the other Great Powers, as being achieved.

However, historians of both Belgium and the Netherlands have largely ignored it. Dutch historians see it as their nadir in the 19th century, for the loss of the southern territories shook the nation's confidence. Belgian historians see the result not as a victory, says Fishman, but as a frustrating and humiliating experience, involving the loss of territory in Luxembourg and Limburg under the settlement terms, in which the great powers allowed Belgium to come into existence.

== Aftermath ==
In 1914, Germany rejected the guarantee of Belgian neutrality as a "scrap of paper", and invaded Belgium. Britain responded by declaring war.

== See also ==
- History of Belgium
- Treaty of the Eighteen Articles
