= Portrait of William I of the Netherlands =

Painting by Joseph Paelinck

Portrait of William I
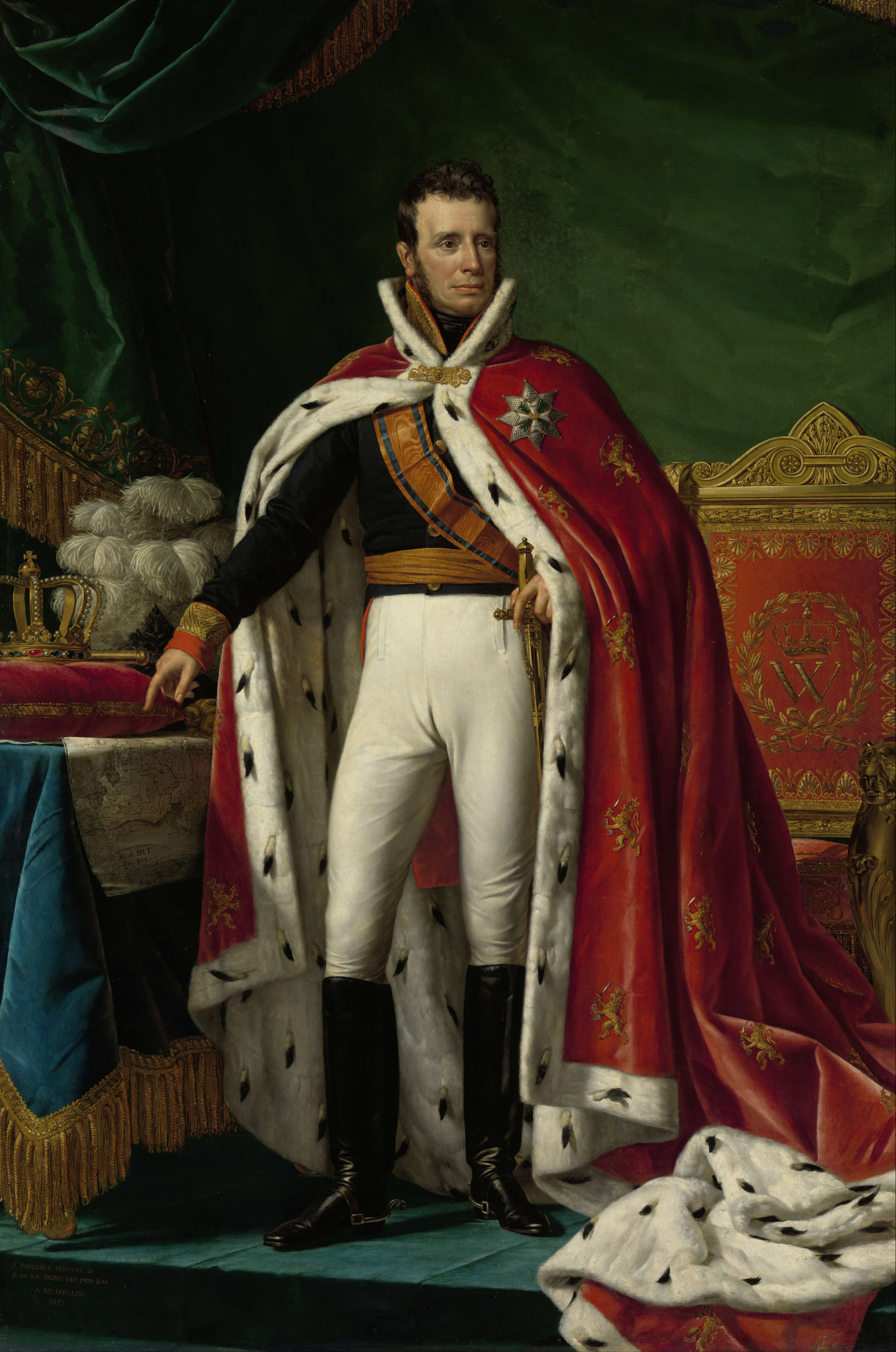
- Artist: Joseph Paelinck
- Year: 1819
- Type: Oil on canvas, portrait painting
- Dimensions: 227 cm × 155.5 cm (89 in × 61.2 in)
- Location: Rijksmuseum; Amsterdam

Portrait of William I is an 1819 portrait painting by the Belgian artist Joseph Paelinck. It depicts William I of the Netherlands, who at the time ruled a United Kingdom including the modern-day Netherlands, Belgium and Luxembourg.

After spending much of his life in exile William had returned to his country in 1813 during the final stages of the Napoleonic Wars and the following year was made king by the Congress of Vienna. In 1830 the Belgian Revolution led to the loss of the southern part of William's kingdom. The painting was produced in Brussels and shows the king at full-length in uniform of a general, wearing a ermine-lined robe and the Military Order of William. He is pointing to a map of Java, then part of the Dutch East Indies, and from 1821 it hung in the Governor's Palace there. Today the painting is in the collection of the Rijksmuseum in Amsterdam.

Paelinck, a pupil of the exiled French artist Jacques-Louis David, had previously produced an 1817 portrait of William, now in the Rhode Island School of Design Museum.

== Bibliography ==
- Crow, Thomas. Restoration: The Fall of Napoleon in the Course of European Art, 1812-1820. Princeton University Press, 2023.
- Vermeulen, Han F. Tales from Academia; History of Anthropology in the Netherlands. Verlag für Entwicklungspolitik Saarbrücken, 2002.
