= Élisa de Gamond =

Belgian painter (1804–1869)

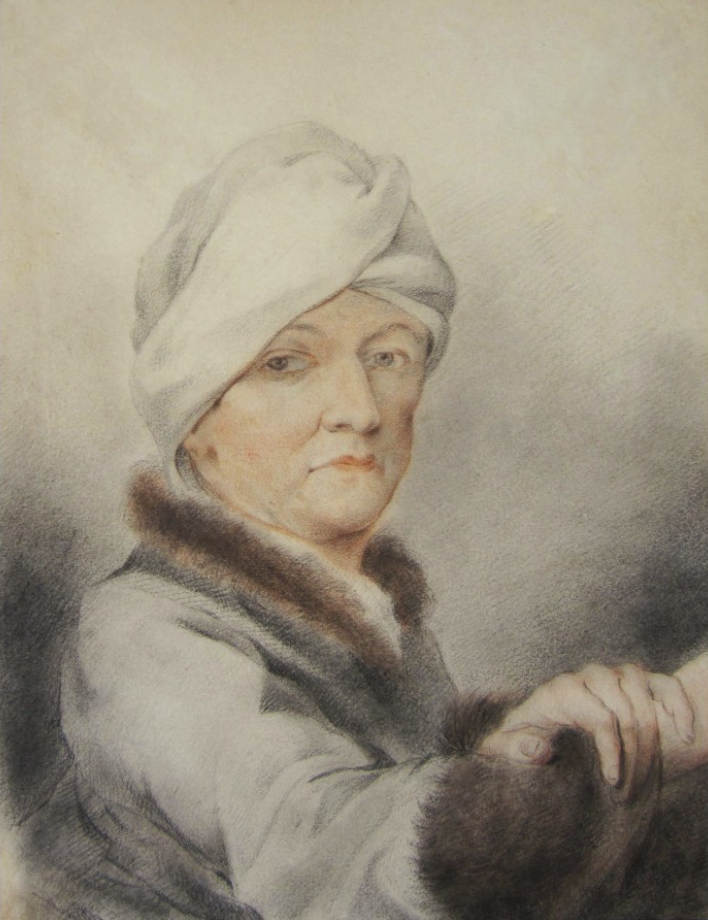
- Self-portrait
- Born: Élisa de Gamond; 3 February 1804; Brussels, France (now in Belgium)
- Died: 3 March 1869 (aged 65); Ixelles, Belgium
- Education: Université libre de Bruxelles
- Occupation: Painter
- Spouse: Auguste Théodore Giron
- Parent(s): Pierre-Joseph de Gamond and Isabelle-Angélique de Lados
- Relatives: Zoé de Gamond (sister)

Élisa de Gamond, born in Brussels on 3 April 1804 and died in Ixelles on 3 March 1869, was a Belgian painter known for her neo-classical works in the field of mythology.

== Biography ==
Coming from a wealthy liberal family, her father, Pierre-Joseph de Gamond, was also a barrister-at-law at the Brussels Bar and ended up as a counsellor at the Brussels Court of Appeal. Pierre-Joseph de Gamond also taught the course entitled "Code de la procédure civile et ordre des Juridictions" at the Université libre de Bruxelles. Her mother, Isabelle-Angélique de Lados, of noble origin, held political and philosophical salons in the 1820s. She died in 1829.

Elisa's career as a painter began around 1820. In 1823, she took part in the exhibition competition of the Royal Academy of Fine Arts in Ghent as a pupil of Joseph Paelinck. The work presented is close to the historical genre. Her works cover the field of historical painting and mythological subjects.

In August 1826, her painting “Sleeping Nymph” won the Ladies' Prize in Ghent, awarded by the leading artists of the kingdom, which consisted of a wreath of myrtle and roses, a medal of honour and an allowance of two hundred florins.

On 26 April 1827, she married Auguste Théodore Giron, a professor at the Athénée royal de Bruxelles. The couple then had four children, born between 1828 and 1838. Around 1830, she and her family settled in Ixelles. According to the art historian Alexia Creusen, her marriage put an end to a promising career.

Her younger sister, Zoé de Gamond, became a renowned teacher and feminist. She and Élisa held salons, learning about politics at a time when women were excluded, notably by participating in the salons held by their mother. This beginning of political life was in line with the revolutionary events of 1830. Later, the two sisters held salons twice a week, as their mother had done in the past.

== Works ==
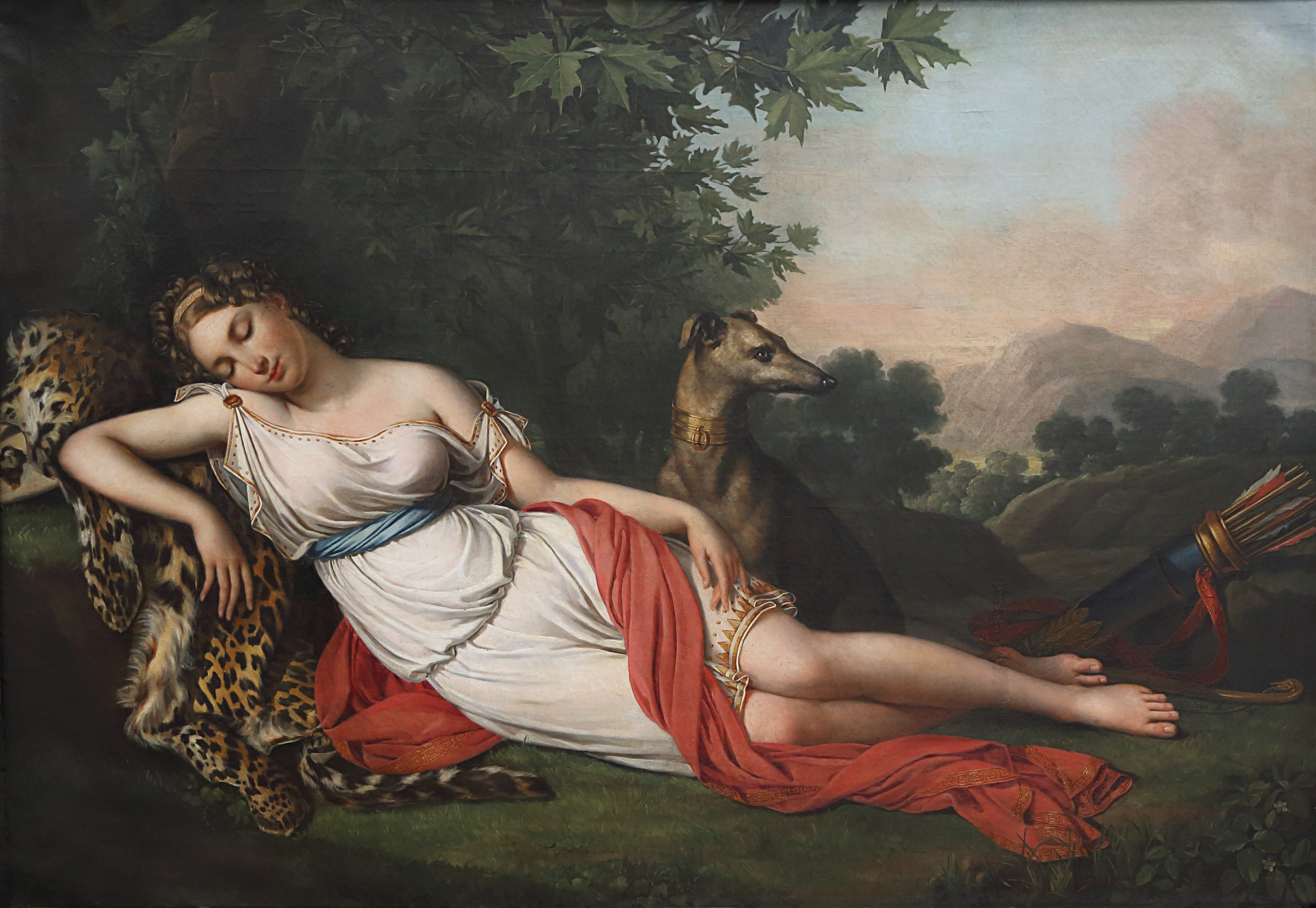
Lost Nymph of Diana’s retinue, 1826, Oil on canvas, Museum of Fine Arts, Ghent, Belgium.
