= Joseph Paelinck =

Dutch painter (1869–1781)

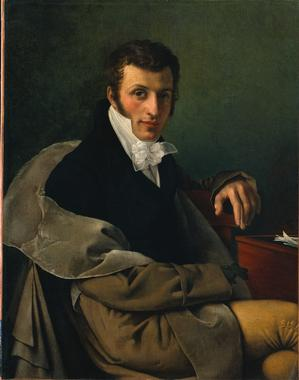
Joseph Paelinck

Joseph Paelinck (20 March 1781 – 19 June 1839) was a painter from the Southern Netherlands.

== Biography ==
Paelinck attended the Royal Academy of Fine Arts (Ghent) and then with Jacques-Louis David in Paris, where he painted in 1804 A Judgment of Paris, which earned him his first Academy Art Award for Ghent. After he had worked there a short time as a teacher, he went to Rome and stayed there for five years. He painted, among other things: Rome under Augustus for the Quirinal Palace and the Discovery of the Cross for St. Michael's Church in Ghent. He was later a professor at the Académie royale de peinture et de sculpture in Brussels.

His many pupils included Charles Baugniet, François Antoine Bodumont, Edouard de Bièfve, Élisa de Gamond, Félix De Vigne, Jean Joseph Geens, Jozef Geirnaert, Joseph Meganck, Fanny Paelinck-Horgnies, Alfred Stevens, Joseph Cohen de Vries and Abraham Johannes Zeeman.

== Paintings ==
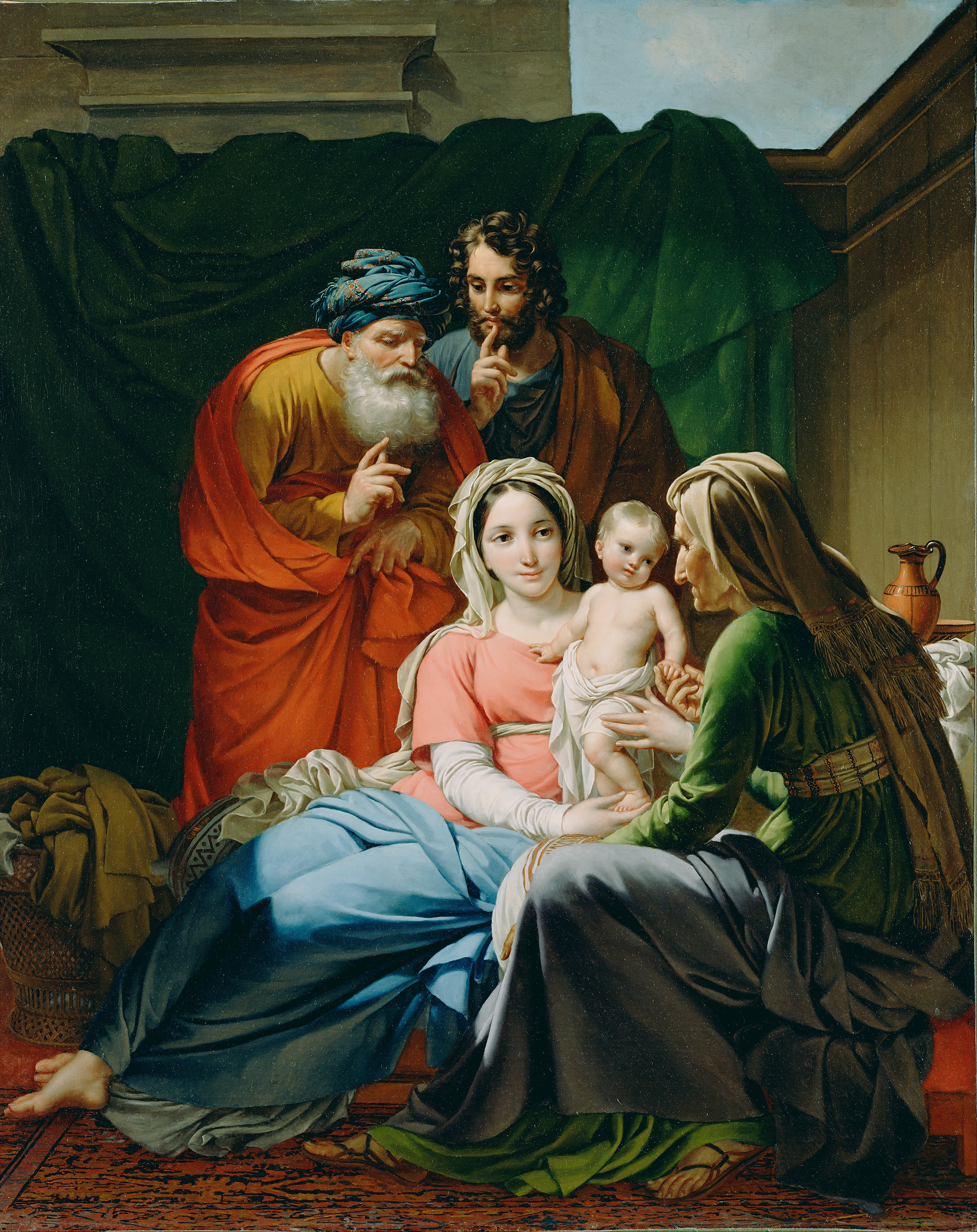
The Holy Family, c. 1819-20

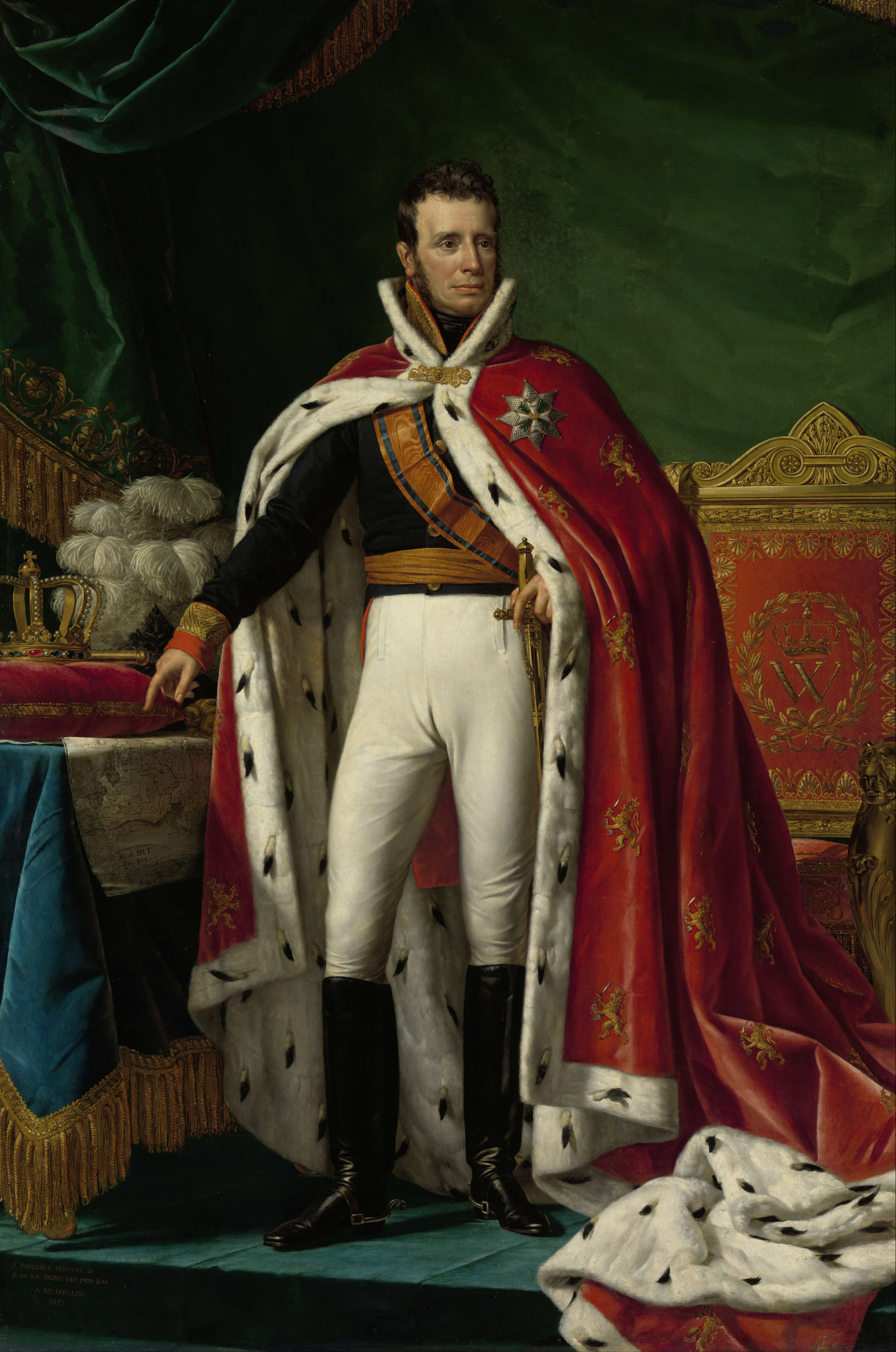
Portrait of William I of the Netherlands Rijksmuseum, 1819

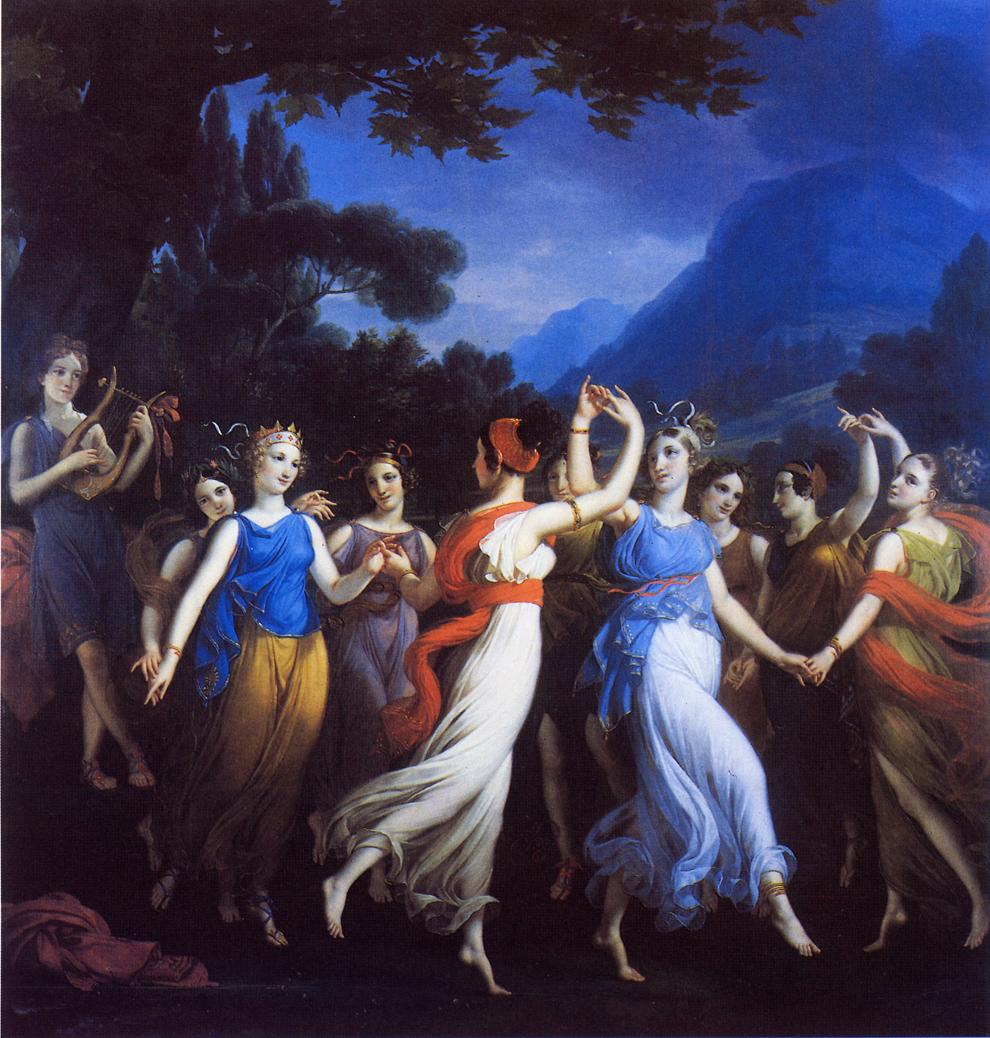
The Dance of the Muses, 1832

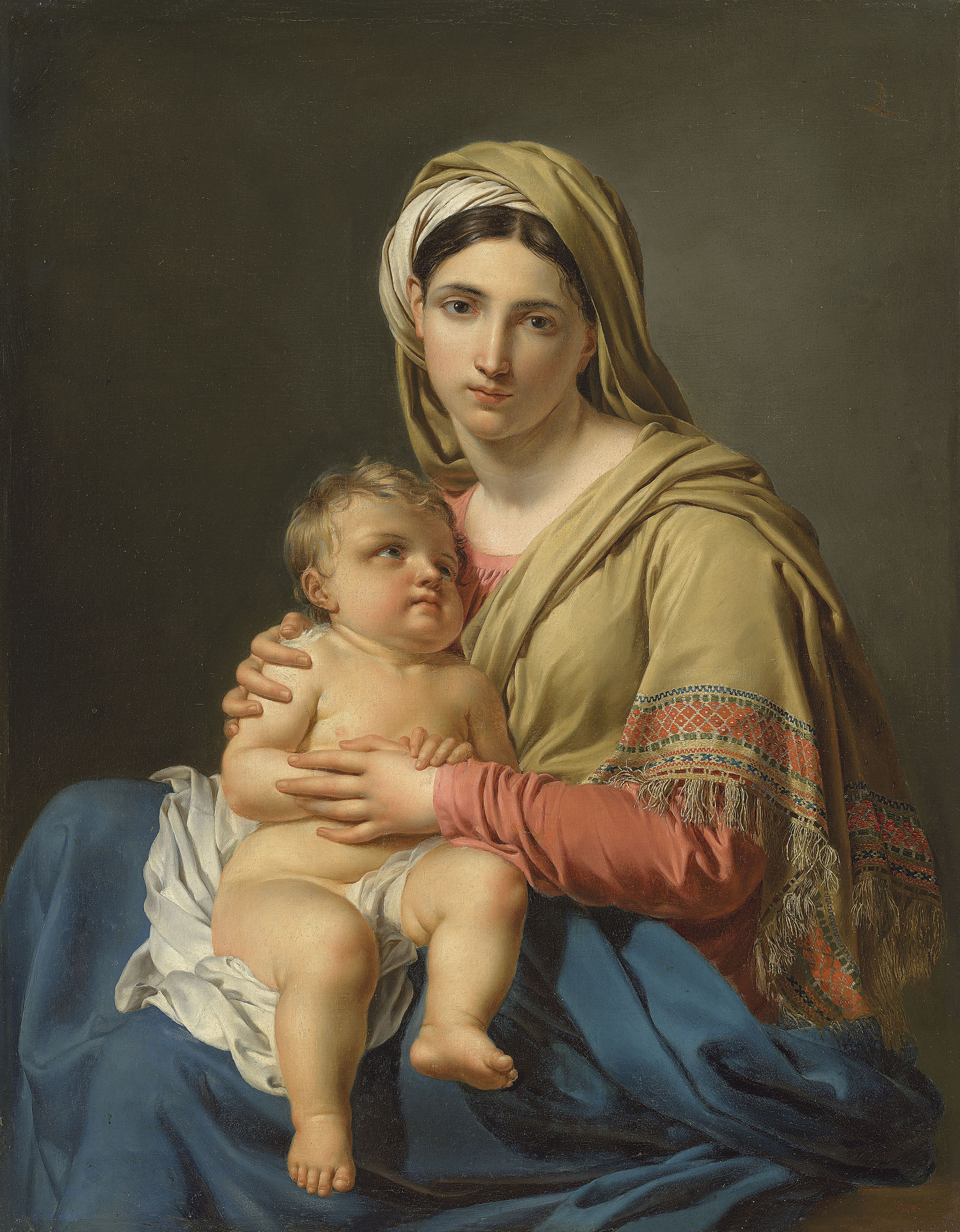
Madonna and Child

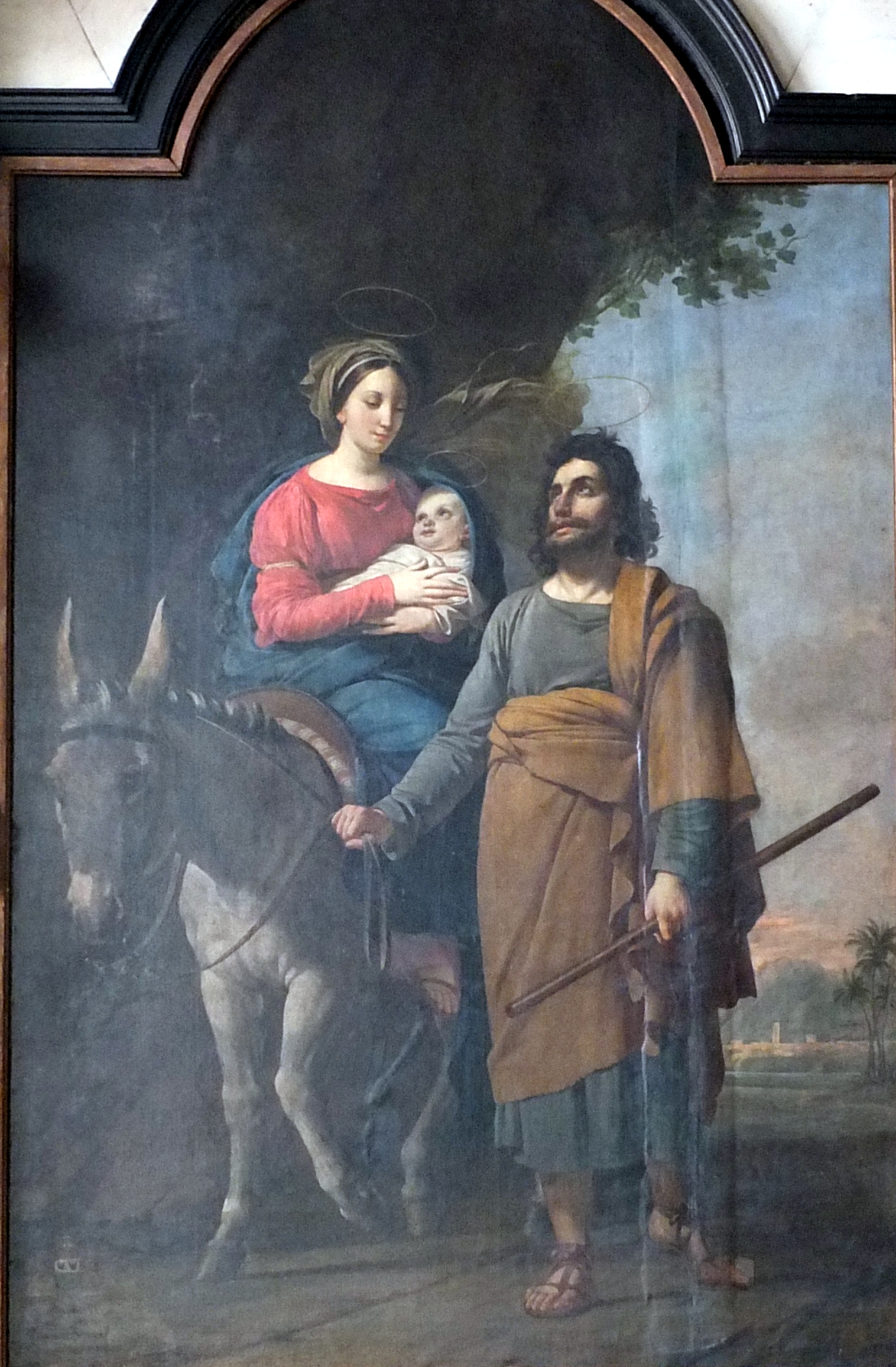
Flight to Egypt

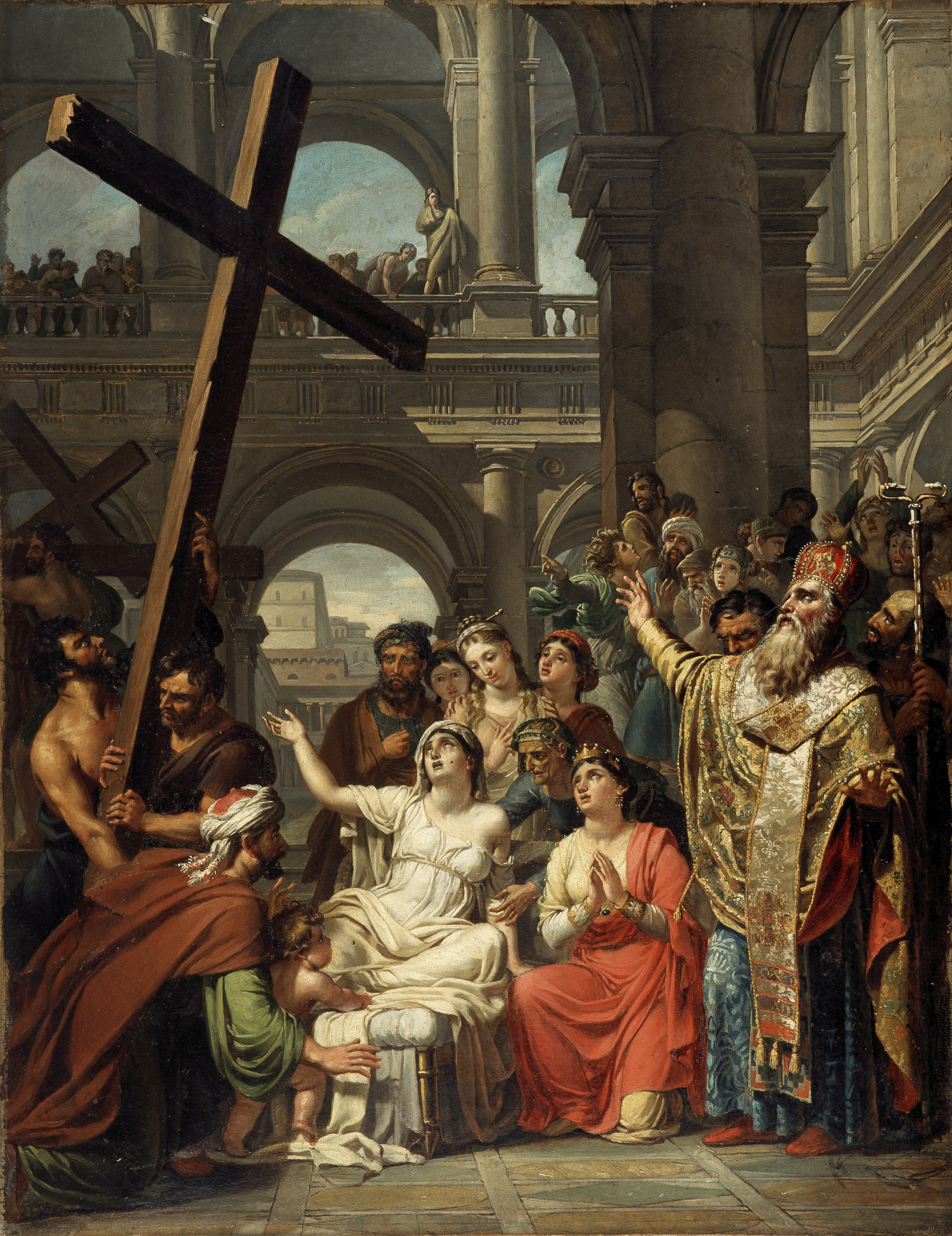
The Find of the Holy Cross, 1808, Museum of Fine Arts, Ghent
