= 1851 in Belgium =

- Decades: 1830s; 1840s; 1850s; 1860s; 1870s
- See also: Other events of 1851; List of years in Belgium

Events in the year 1851 in Belgium.

== Incumbents ==
Monarch: Leopold I
Head of government: Charles Rogier

== Events ==
- National Bank of Belgium prints its first series of banknotes.
- 24 January – Treaty of commerce and navigation with the Kingdom of Sardinia signed in Turin.
- 23 February – Willemsfonds established.
- 18 April – New law on bankruptcy.
- 24 April – Convention with the Netherlands allowing steamships on the Ghent–Terneuzen Canal signed in The Hague.
- May-October – Embroiderer Joseph Van Halle exhibits "Church ornaments and Brussels lace" at the Great Exhibition in London. The Belgian ambassador, Sylvain Van de Weyer, was consulted to ensure that the display of ecclesiastical vestments was arranged in such a way as not to offend Protestant sensibilities.
- 8 May – Convention with The Netherlands abolishing tolls on the Meuse signed in Brussels.
- 19 May – Railway line between Liège and Namur completed.
- 30 June – Protocol to the convention abolishing tolls on the Meuse signed in Brussels.
- 27 September – Elections to the Senate
- 27 October – Treaty of commerce and navigation with the United Kingdom of Great Britain and Ireland signed in London.
- 11 December – Victor Hugo's exile in Belgium begins.

== Publications ==
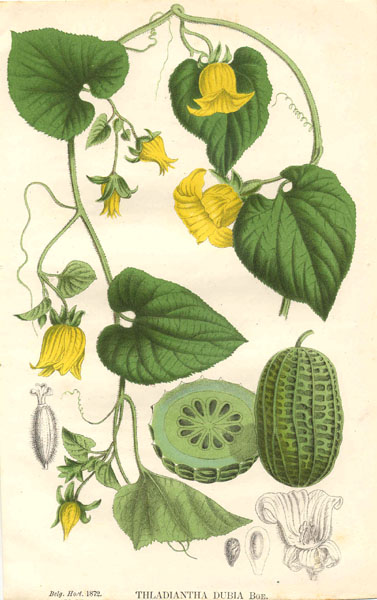
Thladiantha dubia from La Belgique Horticole

Periodicals

- Almanach du commerce et de l'industrie, ed. H. Tarlier (Brussels, G. Stapleaux)
- Annales de l'Observatoire Royal de Bruxelles, vol. 8, edited by Adolphe Quetelet.
- Annuaire de la noblesse de Belgique, vol. 5, edited by Isidore de Stein d'Altenstein
- La Belgique Horticole begins publication.
- Journal de l'armée belge, vol. 1.

Official publications and monographs

- Code de justice et de discipline militaires (Brussels, Librairie universelle de Rozez).
- Recueil des lois et arrêtés royaux de la Belgique, vol. 22.
- Henri Alexis Brialmont, Précis d'art militaire (Brussels, A. Jamar)
- Henri Alexis Brialmont, Considérations politiques et militaires sur la Belgique, vols. 1-2 (Brussels, M. Hayez)
- Louis Prosper Gachard, Correspondance de Philippe II sur les affaires des Pays-Bas, vol. 2
- G. Lacambre, Traité complet de la fabrication des bières et de la distillation des grains, pommes de terre, vins, betteraves, mélasses, etc. (Brussels, Librairie Polytechnique d'Aug. Decq)

Literary publications

- Johan Michiel Dautzenberg, Beknopte prosodia der Nederduitsche taal

== Art and architecture ==
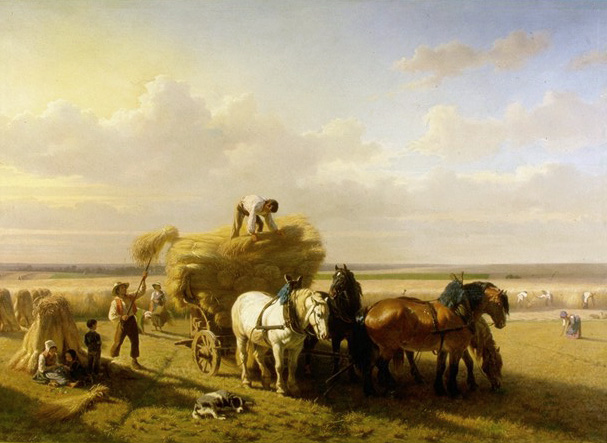
Charles-Philogène Tschaggeny, The Gathering of the Harvest (1851)

Paintings

- Hendrick Joseph Dillens, The Winning Archer
- Edouard Hamman, Disillusion
- Henri Adolphe Schaep, View of a Harbour
- Charles-Philogène Tschaggeny, The Gathering of the Harvest

== Births ==
- 8 January – Gérard Leman, general (died 1920)
- 21 April – Eugène Siberdt, painter (died 1931)
- 21 May – Charles Emile Stuyvaert, astronomer (died 1908)
- 27 June – Théodore Nilis, colonial official (died 1905)
- 21 July – Auguste Brancart, publisher of pornography (date of death unknown)
- 6 August – Paul Wittouck, industrialist (died 1917)
- 12 August – Aloïs Boudry, painter (died 1938)
- 19 August – Frans Schollaert, politician (died 1917)
- 25 September – Victor Harou, explorer (died 1923)
- 4 October – Michel Levie, politician (died 1939)
- 7 October – Lucien Solvay, newspaper editor (died 1950)
- 21 November – Désiré-Joseph Mercier, cardinal-archbishop (died 1926)
- 10 December – Alfred Ronner, artist (died 1901)

== Deaths ==
- 17 February – Jean-Baptiste Minne-Barth (born 1796), politician
- 4 July – Martin-Joseph Mengal (born 1784), composer
- 19 July – Hippolyte Visart de Bocarmé (born 1818), nobleman and murderer
