= 1850 in Belgium =

- Decades: 1830s; 1840s; 1850s; 1860s; 1870s
- See also: Other events of 1850; List of years in Belgium

Events in the year 1850 in Belgium.

== Incumbents ==
Monarch: Leopold I
Head of government: Charles Rogier

== Events ==
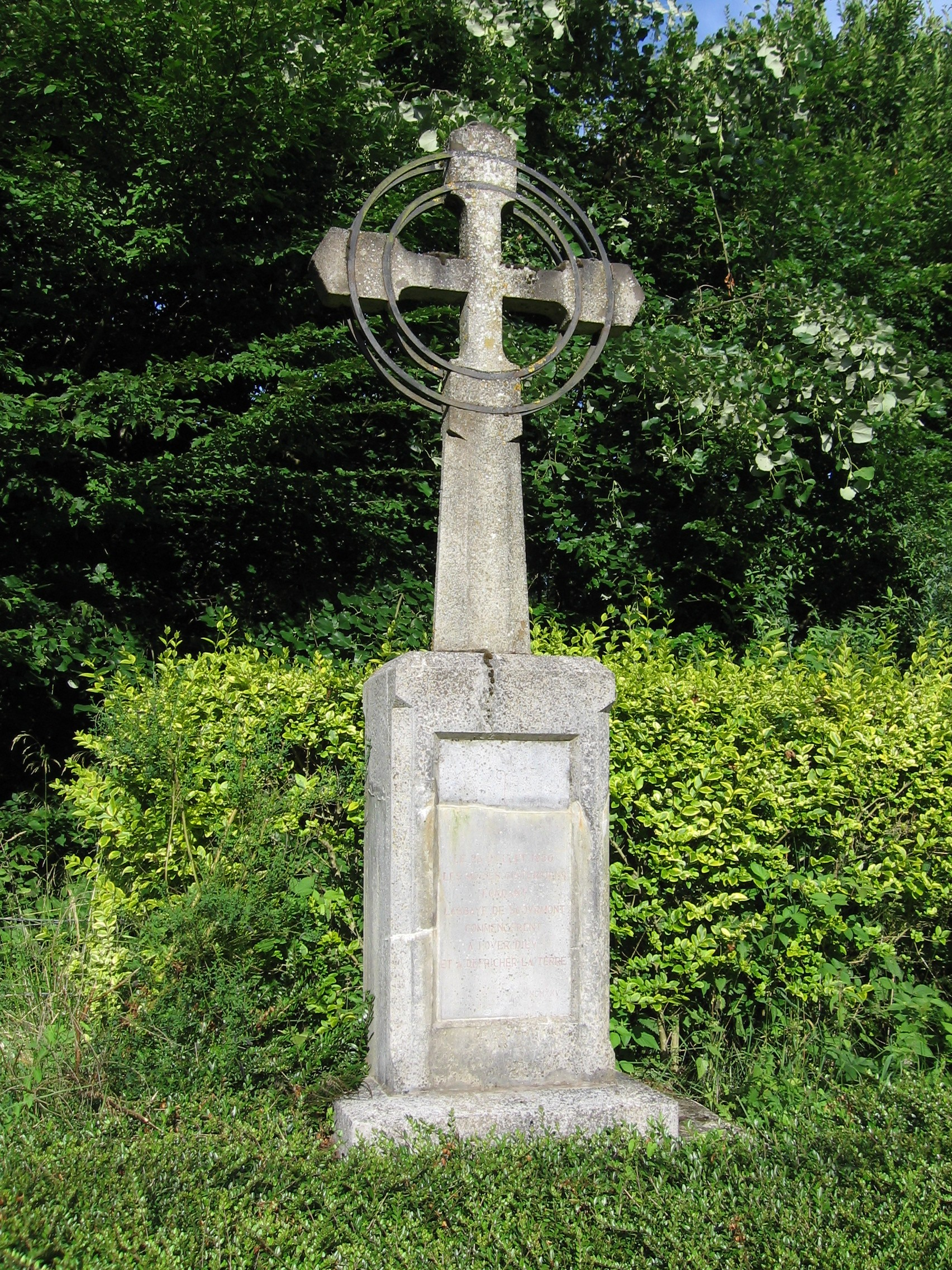
Foundation cross of Scourmont Abbey

- Sint-Lodewijkscollege established in Lokeren
- 14 February – Treaty of commerce and navigation with the Russian Empire signed in Berlin.
- 5 May – National Bank of Belgium founded
- 27 May - Provincial elections
- 11 June – Partial legislative elections
- 25 July – Scourmont Priory established
- 4 August – Mediation by the King of the Belgians leads to the restoration of diplomatic relations between Spain and the United Kingdom.
- 25 September – King Leopold lays the first stone of the Congress Column in Brussels
- 31 October – Treaty of commerce and navigation with Bolivia signed in Brussels

== Publications ==
Periodicals

- Almanach de poche de Bruxelles
- Almanach royal officiel
- Annuaire de la noblesse de Belgique, edited by Isidore de Stein d'Altenstein (Brussels, Muquardt)
- Recueil des lois et arrêtés royaux de la Belgique, vol. 21 (Brussels, E. Devroye).
- Revue de Bruxelles ceases publication

Books

- Félix Victor Goethals, Dictionnaire généalogique et héraldique des familles nobles du Royaume de Belgique, vol. 3.
- Adolphe Joanne, Voyage en Orient (Ixelles lez Bruxelles, Delevingne & Callewaert)
- Edouard Mary, Epîtres en vers sur la Belgique.
- Jean-Joseph Thonissen, Le Socialisme et ses promesses (2 volumes)
- Pierre-Joseph van Beneden, Recherches sur la faune littorale de Belgique: Les vers cestoïdes ou acotyles (Brussels, Hayez)
- Edward Weller, Nouveau dictionnaire anglais-français et français-anglais (Brussels)

== Art and architecture ==
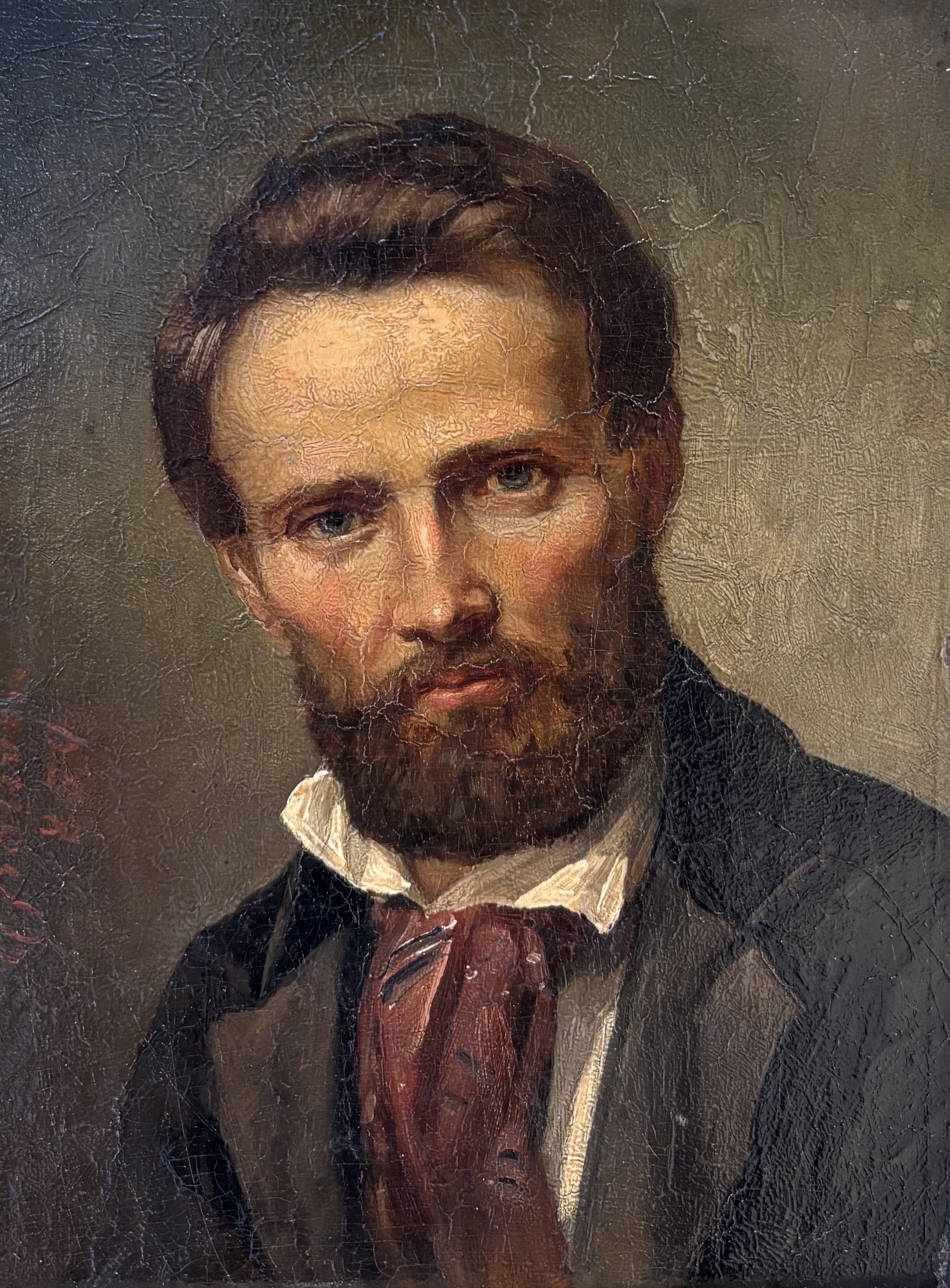
Auguste Chauvin, Self-portrait (1850), now in Museum of Walloon Art, Liège

Paintings

- Auguste Chauvin, Self-portrait
- Jan August Hendrik Leys, Divine Service in Holland

== Births ==
- 5 January – Theodoor Verstraete, artist (died 1907)
- 30 January – Emma De Vigne, painter (died 1898)
- 20 February – Eugène Joors, painter (died 1910)
- 20 March – Marietta Hannon Rousseau, mycologist (died 1926)
- 14 April – Fredegand Cogels, politician (died 1932)
- 9 May – Fernande de Mertens, painter (died 1924)
- 8 October – Léon Herbo, painter (died 1907)
- 4 November – Jules Bilmeyer, architect (died 1920)
- 17 November – Hippolyte d'Ursel, politician and historian (died 1937)
- 29 December – Frans Van Leemputten, painter (died 1914)

== Deaths ==
- 29 April – Charles de Brouckère (born 1757), politician
- 5 September – Paul-François Huart-Chapel (born 1770), industrialist and politician
- 11 October – Queen Louise (born 1812)
