= 1852 in Belgium =

- Decades: 1830s; 1840s; 1850s; 1860s; 1870s
- See also: Other events of 1852; List of years in Belgium

Events in the year 1852 in Belgium.

== Incumbents ==
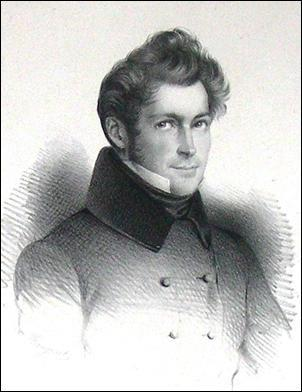
Henri de Brouckère, prime minister 1852-1855

Monarch: Leopold I
Head of government: Charles Rogier (to 31 October); Henri de Brouckère (from 31 October)

== Events ==
- 12 February – State visit of Queen Victoria and Prince Albert to Belgium.
- 15 April – Postal convention between Belgium and the Office of the Prince of Tour and Taxis signed in Brussels.
- 24 May – Provincial elections
- 8 June – Partial legislative elections of 1852.
- 22 August – Franco-Belgian conventions on intellectual property and tariffs.
- 31 October – Henri de Brouckère replaces Charles Rogier as Prime Minister.
- 7 November – Théodore de Montpellier consecrated as bishop of Liège in succession to Cornelius van Bommel.

== Publications ==
Periodicals

- Almanach royal officiel (Brussels, Librairie Polytechnique)
- La Belgique Horticole, vol. 2.

Guidebooks and directories

- Belgium and the Rhine (London, David Bogue).
- Guide pittoresque du voyageur en Belgique: Itinéraire artistique, industriel et manufacturier (Guide Richard, 7th edition; Paris, L. Maison)
- Murray's Handbook for Belgium and the Rhine (London, John Murray)

Other

- Collection des discours prononcés aux distributions de prix des athénées royaux (Tournai, Bureau du Moniteur de l'Enseignement)
- Henri Alexis Brialmont, Considérations politiques et militaires sur la Belgique, vol. 3 (Brussels, M. Hayez)
- Jules de Saint-Genois, Feuillets détachés

== Art and architecture ==
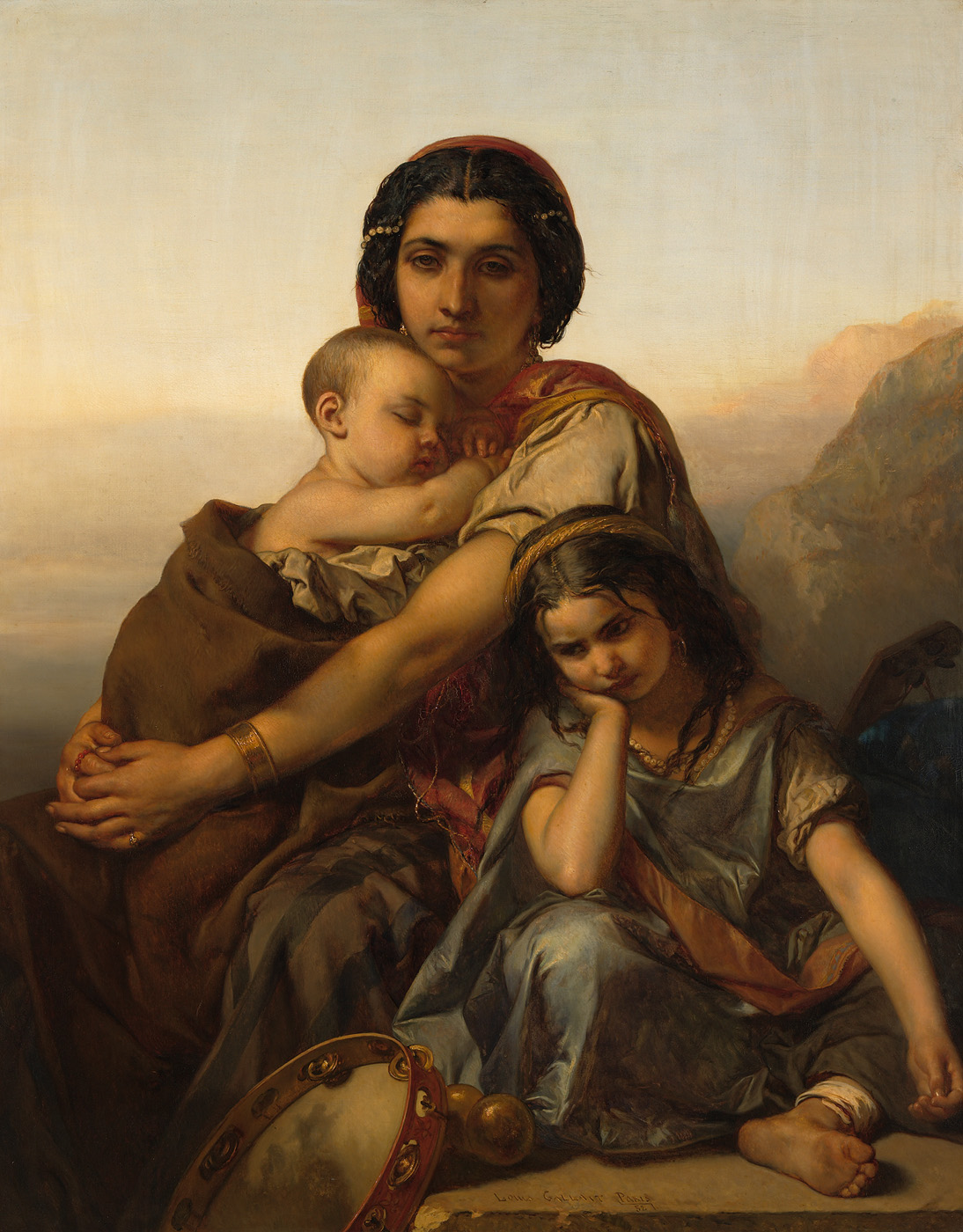
Louis Gallait, Gypsy Woman with Two Children (1852)

Paintings

- Louis Gallait, Gypsy Woman with Two Children

== Births ==
- 6 January – Jacques Forget, priest and scholar (died 1933)
- 24 January – Alexander Struys, painter (died 1941)
- 7 March – Constant de Deken, missionary (died 1896)
- 25 March – Gérard Cooreman, politician (died 1926)
- 27 March – Jan van Beers, artist (died 1927)
- 10 April – Arthur Vierendeel, engineer (died 1940)
- 21 April – Edward Maene, sculptor (died 1931)
- 9 June – Frans Van Kuyck, artist (died 1915)
- 12 July – Henry Moeller, review editor (died 1918)
- 31 August – Joris Helleputte, architect and politician (died 1925)
- 20 September – Édouard Empain, engineer-entrepreneur (died 1929)
- 2 December – Lucien Bia, soldier (died 1892)

== Deaths ==
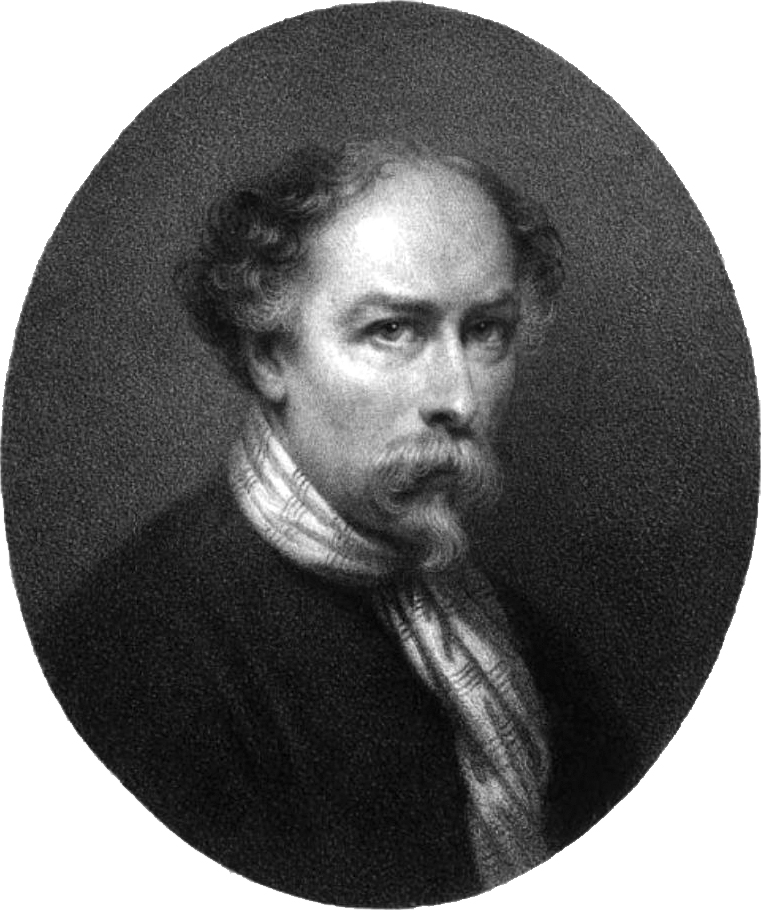
Henri Decaisne (1799–1852), self-portrait c. 1850

- 28 January – Augustin Dumon-Dumortier (born 1791), industrialist and politician
- 7 April – Cornelius van Bommel (born 1790), bishop of Liège
- 6 May – Charles-Louis-Joseph Hanssens (born 1777), theatre director
- 17 October – Henri Decaisne (born 1799), painter
