= 1853 in Belgium =

- Decades: 1830s; 1840s; 1850s; 1860s; 1870s
- See also: Other events of 1853; List of years in Belgium

Events in the year 1853 in Belgium.

== Incumbents ==
Monarch: Leopold I
Head of government: Henri de Brouckère

== Events ==
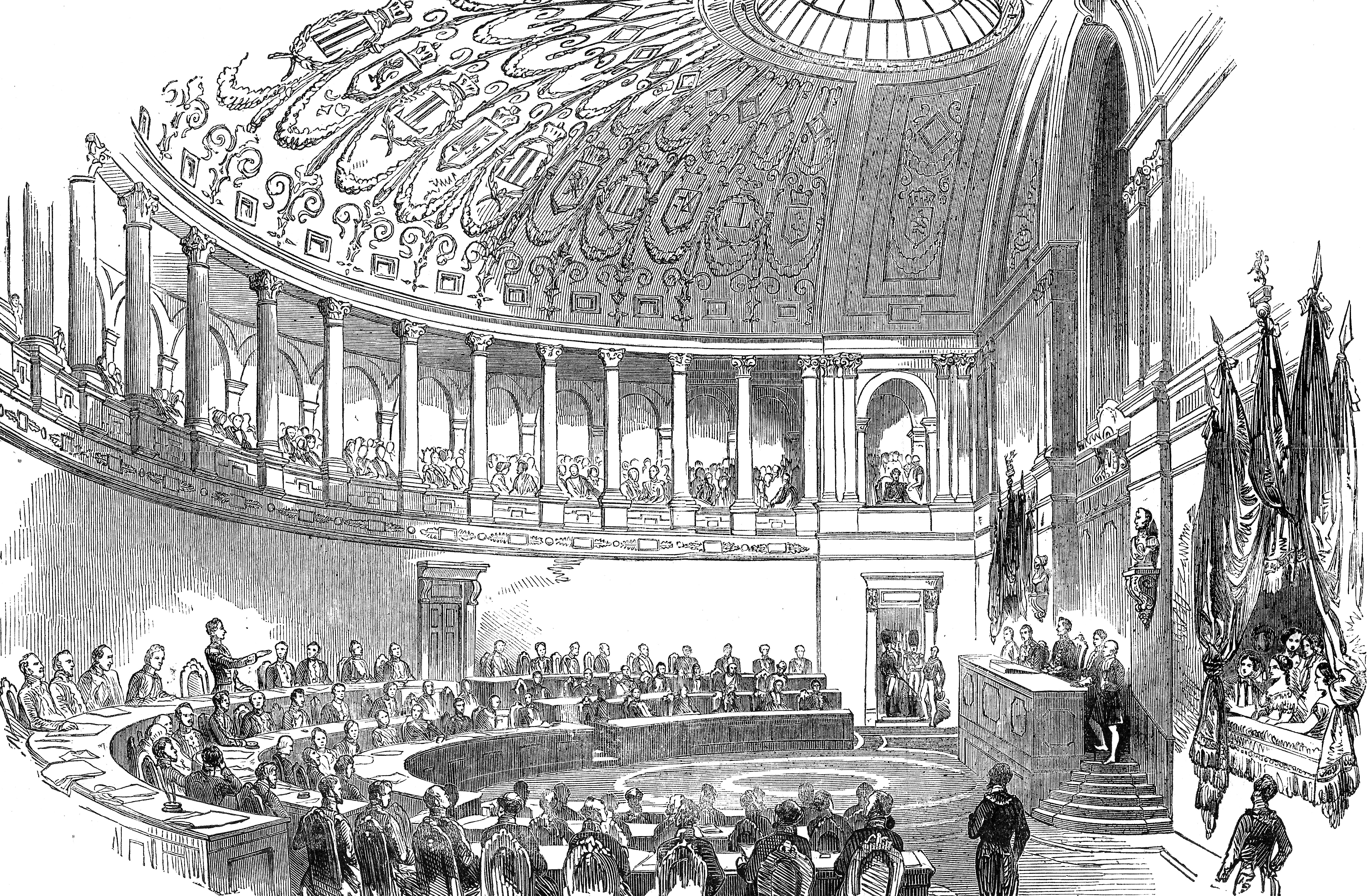
Leopold, Duke of Brabant, sworn in as a member of the Belgian Senate

- 9 April – Prince Leopold sworn in as a member of the Belgian Senate.
- 9 June – Aalst railway station opens.
- 22 August – Marriage of Leopold, Duke of Brabant, heir to the Belgian throne, and Marie Henriette of Austria.
- 23 August – International Maritime Conference opens in Brussels under the chairmanship of Adolphe Quetelet and at the instigation of Matthew Fontaine Maury (ends 8 September)
- 19 September – First International Statistical Congress opens in Brussels under the chairmanship of Adolphe Quetelet.

== Publications ==
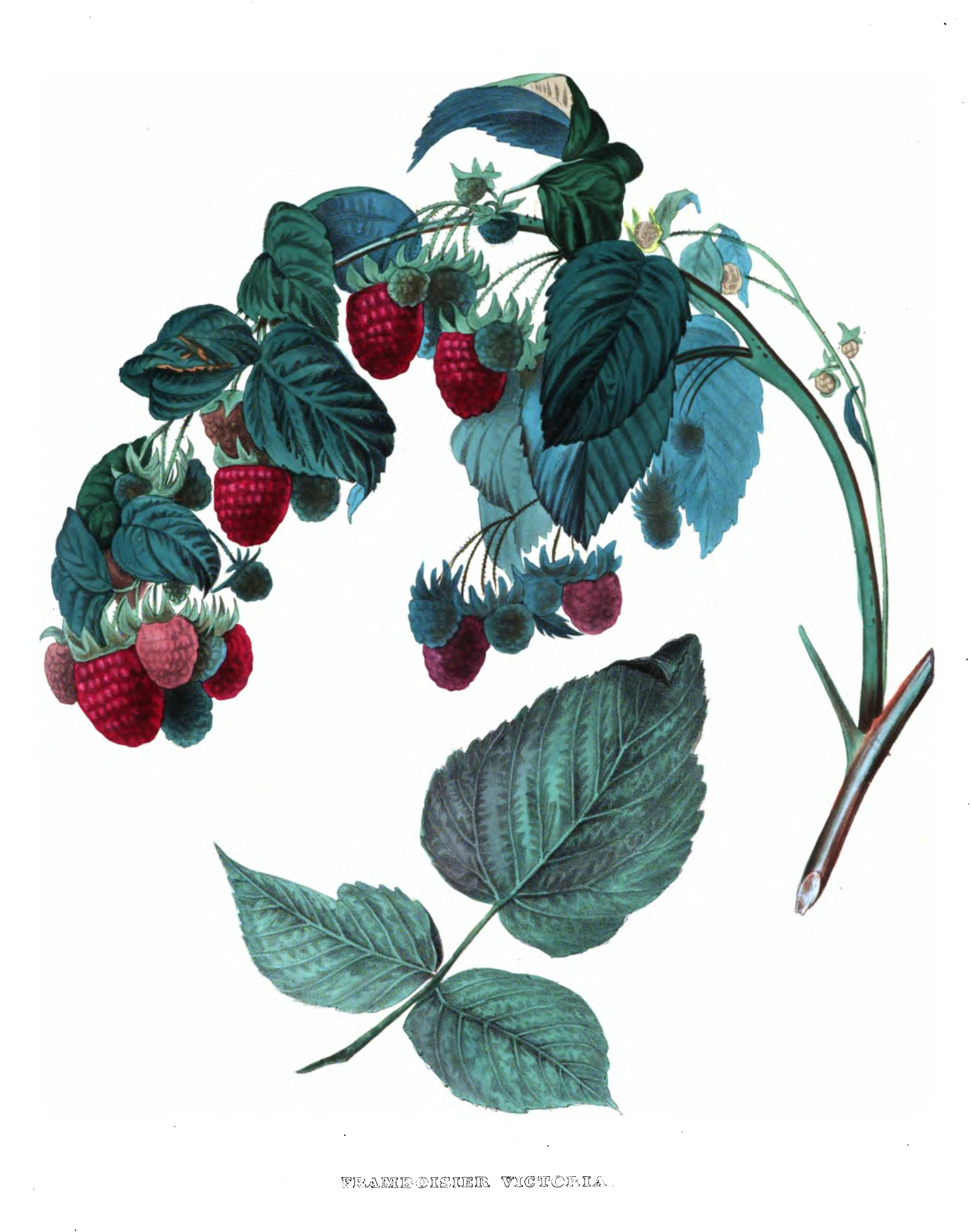
Victoria raspberry from Annales de pomologie belge et étrangère, vol. 1 (1853)

- Alexandre Rodenbach, Les aveugles et les sourds-muets: histoire, instruction, éducation, biographies (Brussels, J. A. Slingeneyer)

Periodicals

- Almanach royal officiel (Brussels, H. Tarlier)
- Annales de pomologie belge et étrangère (Commission Royale de Pomologie) begins publication.
- Annuaire de la noblesse de Belgique, vol. 5, edited by Isidore de Stein d'Altenstein
- La Belgique Horticole, vol. 3.
- Bulletins de l'Académie Royale des Sciences, des Lettres et des Beaux-Arts de Belgique, vol. 20 (Brussels, M. Hayez)
- Recueil des pièces imprimées par ordre de la Chambre des Représentants, vol. 3.

Guidebooks and directories

- Bradshaw's illustrated hand-book for travellers in Belgium, on the Rhine, and through portions of Rhenish Prussia (London, W.J. Adams)
- Francis Coghlan, The Miniature Guide to the Rhine through Belgium and Holland (London, J. Onwhyn)

== Art and architecture ==
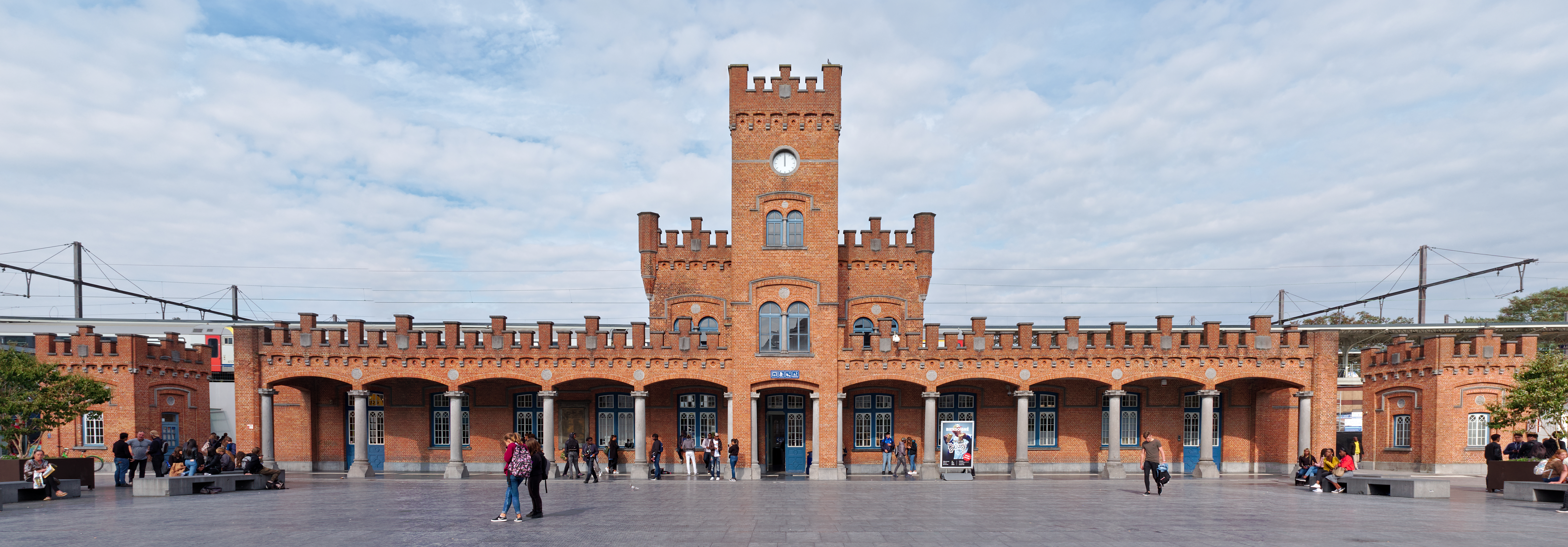
Aalst railway station

Buildings

- Aalst railway station

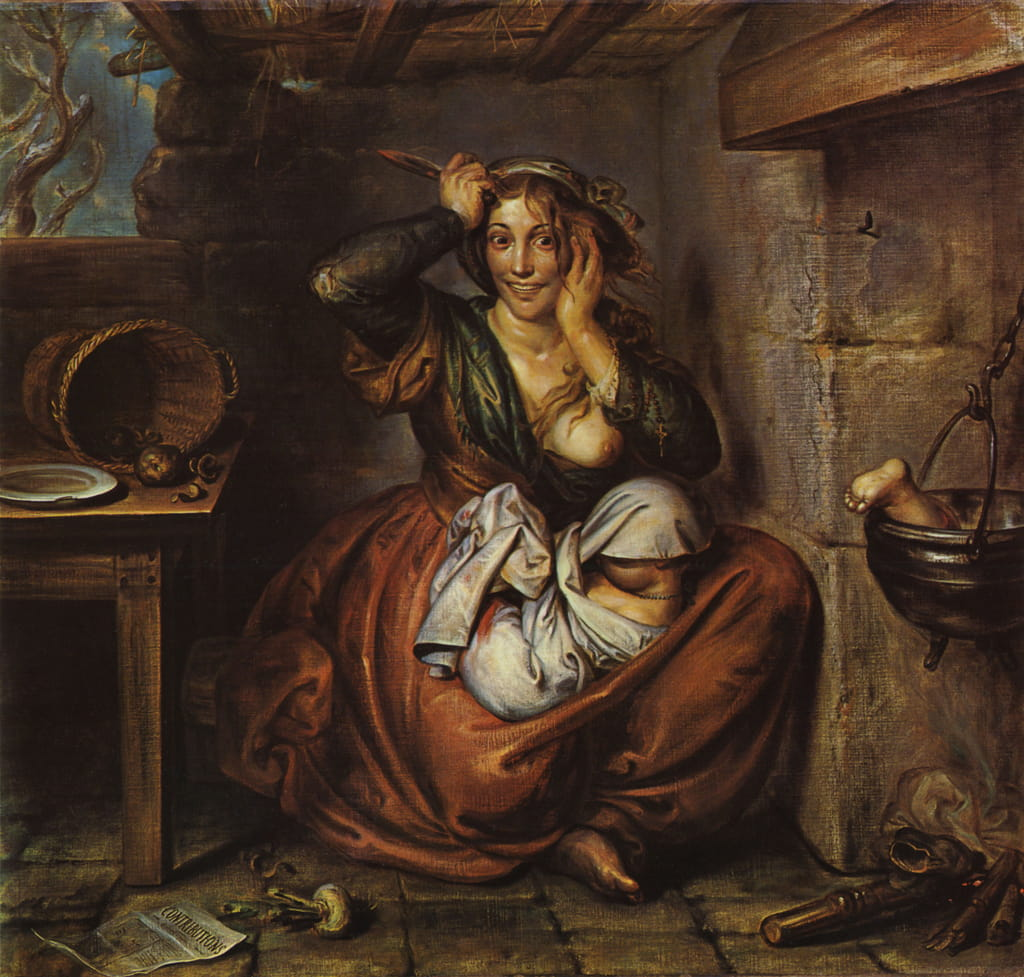
Antoine Wiertz, Hunger, Madness and Crime (1853), Wiertz Museum

Paintings

- Henri Leys, Frans Floris Going to a Saint Luke's Day Feast 1540
- Charles Verlat, Buffalo Ambushed by a Tiger
- Antoine Wiertz, Hunger, Madness and Crime

== Births ==
- 31 January – Marie-Elisabeth Belpaire, Flemish activist (died 1948)
- 14 February – Jan Van Rijswijck, politician (died 1906)
- 20 December – Marie Parent, feminist (died 1934)

== Deaths ==
- 11 January – Floris Nollet (born 1794), engineer
- 18 January – Antoine Payen the Younger (born 1792), painter
- 12 February – Joseph Van Hoorde (born 1818), horticulturalist
- 5 March — Hirsch Sommerhausen (born 1781), educator and translator
- 30 April – Edouard Mary (born 1796), social reformer
- 3 December – Lazare Richtenberger (born 1792), banker
