= Jan van Beers =

Jan van Beers may refer to:

- Jan van Beers (poet) (1821–1888), Belgian poet
- Jan van Beers (artist) (1852–1927), Belgian painter and illustrator
