= Jules Bilmeyer =

Flemish architect

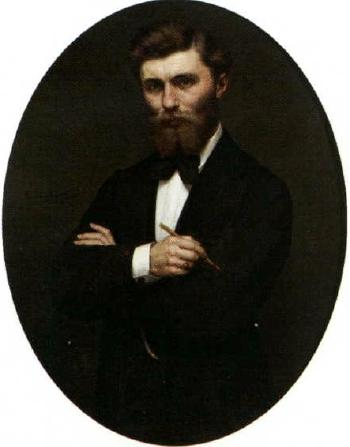
Eugène Siberdt - Portrait of the architect Jules Bilmeyer

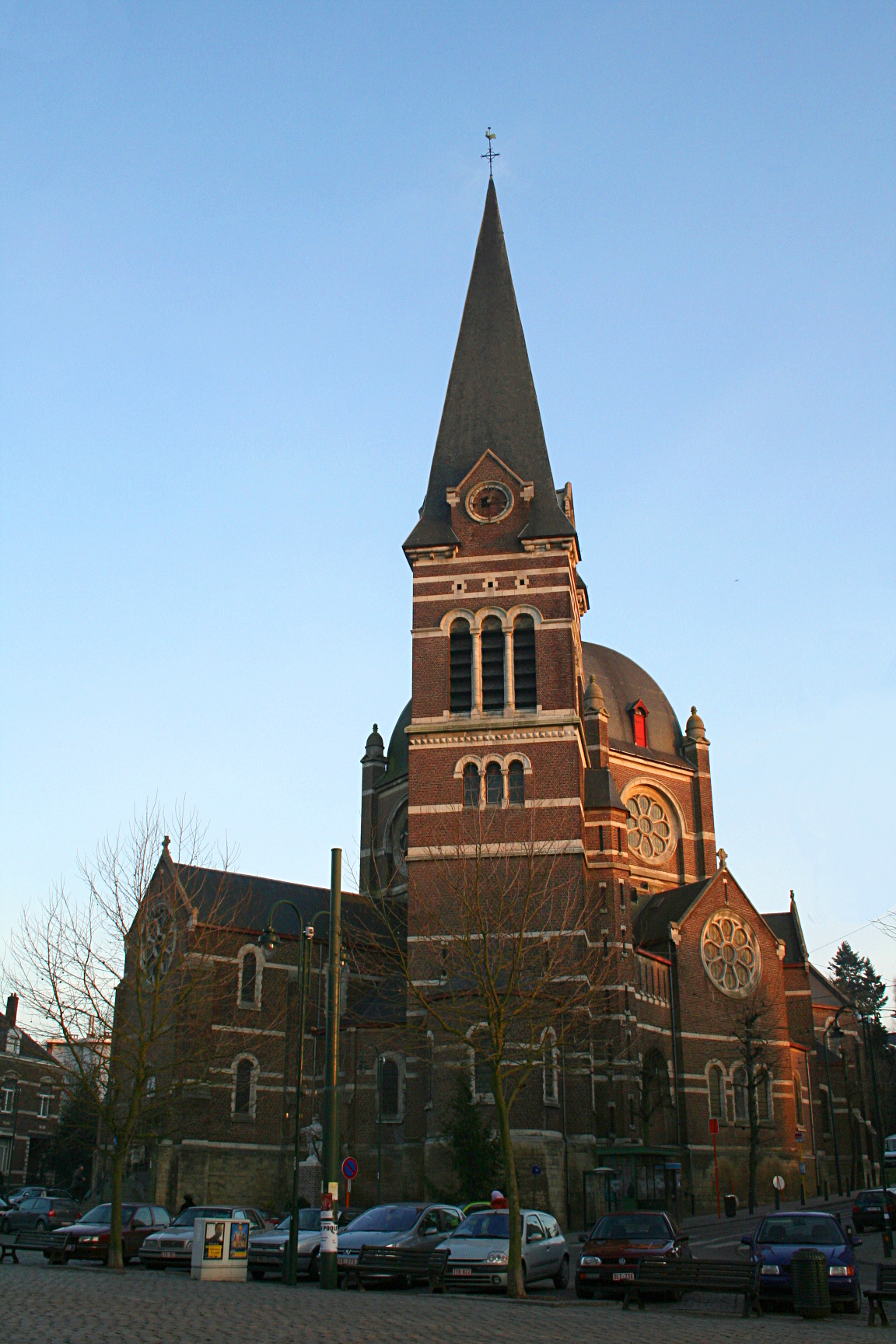
The church Saint Job in Uccle.

Julius Petrus Bilmeyer (Berchem, 4 November 1850 – Berchem, 13 June 1920) was a Flemish architect and professor at the Antwerp Academy.

Bilmeyer enrolled in the architecture courses at the Antwerp Academy from 1865 to 1870. He worked simultaneously at the architecture office of the Baeckelmans brothers: Frans Clemens Baeckelmans (1827–1896) and Jan Lodewijk Baeckelmans (1835–1871).

== Life ==
His father, Joannes Franciscus Gregorius Bilmeyer (Antwerp, 21 October 1822 - Antwerp, 26 April 1897), was a ceiling artist and his father was a glazier. From his marriage to Alida Du Jardin, daughter of painter and professor at the Antwerp Academy Edward Du Jardin, he had five children. Of these five, two became priests. Julien Bilmeyer s.j. ( Antwerp, 15 August 1881 - Sitagarah, India 22 May 1953), was active as a Jesuit priest in India. Willy Bilmeyer (Antwerp, 28 March 1886 - Herselt, 7 May 1976) was a priest in Watermaal-Bosvoorde and also a keen amateur photographer. Two daughters entered the convent, Mathilde with the Daughters of the Sacred Heart of Jesus and Maria with the Franciscan nuns. One son, Edouard Bilmeyer (Antwerp, 19 September 1883 - Antwerp, 17 April 1948), became an architect and succeeded his father. Edouard was succeeded by Jan (who trained but died in an accident at a young age) and Julien Bilmeyer, who in turn pursued the profession of architect. The fourth generation is represented by architect Filip Jacobs, great-grandson of Jules and grandson of Edouard.

Julius Petrus Bilmeyer lived in Antwerp (Berchem) in a house he designed, at number 37 Cardinal Mercierlei. He was buried in that municipality's cemetery, in plot N-23. In the Berchem district of Groenenhoek, the Jules Bilmeyerstraat was named after him.

== Career ==
In 1901, Jules Bilmeyer became professor of architecture at the Royal Academy of Fine Arts in Antwerp, succeeding Joseph Van Riel. In collaboration with this architect, he built the Convent and Basilica of the Sacred Heart (inspired by the Sainte-Chapelle in Paris) in the Merodelei in Berchem. The Church of Our Lady of Grace on Frankrijklei in Antwerp was also a product of this collaboration. This was followed by the church of St Anthony on Paardenmarkt in Antwerp (based on the plans of the late architect Jan-Lodewijk Baeckelmans), the church of Carlo St Job in Uccle (inspired by the cathedral in Aachen), the church of St Catherine in Antwerp-Kiel, the church St Anthony from Padua in Essen, the church of Wuustwezel, St.-Luciachurch in Oosterlo, the St.-Nicholaschurh in Morkhoven and quite a few monasteries. One of these is the (former) convent of Franciscan Sisters in Antwerp, protected by Ministerial Decree of 15 April 2009.

Also in collaboration with architect Van Riel, the Stuyvenberg Hospital in Antwerp was carried out in 1884 according to Frans Baeckelmans' competition design dated 1872-73. Baeckelmans rejected to make further adjustments to his competition design in 1876 and Bilmeyer and Van Riel (his pupils) were called upon to adjust the design and bring the job to a successful conclusion. So they did and the entire site execution came under their care. The third Calvariënberg hospital in Maastricht followed in 1891. Both were pavilion hospitals, which at the time was an innovative concept for a hospital. Of the Maastricht hospital, only the Elisabeth House has survived.

List of built churches, monasteries and schools :

- Convent and Basilica of the Sacred Heart in the Merodelei in Berchem
- Church Our Lady of Grace at Frankrijklei 89 in Antwerp
- Renovations to the school buildings Jesuit College on Frankrijklei 91 in Antwerp
- Pensionate Sacré-Coeur in the Lamorinièrestraat in Antwerp. Present Secondary Yavne school.
- Church of St. Anthony on the Paardenmarkt in Antwerp (according to the plans of Jan-Lodewijk Baeckelmans).
- Convent of the grauwzusters - Third phase 1909, Korte Winkelstraat 28a, Antwerp
- Church of St. Job in the Carloo district, Uccle (inspired by the Aachen Cathedral)
- Saint Joseph's Parish Church, Antwerp (construction of a side portal)
- Saint Catherine (adaptation works) on the Kiel in Antwerp
- St. Anthony of Padua church at Sint-Antoniusplein in Essen
- St. Lucia's church in Oosterlo near Geel
- Church of Our Lady of the Assumption (Wuustwezel) in Wuustwezel
- Our Lady of Perpetual Help (Hallaar) church in Hallaar. Extension and repair works in 1898.
- St. Nicholas church in Morkhoven.
- Custodial school Sint Maria at Paardenmarkt 111 in Antwerp (dd 1905-1910)
- Patronage of the Saint-Amandus parish Vliegenstraat 32 in Antwerp
- Restoration of the church of Eppegem
- Franciscan convent in Antwerp
- Repairs to the church of St. Charles Borromeo in Antwerp
- Design of the pulpit for the Sint-Catharina church 's-Gravenwezel Sint-Catharina church ('s-Gravenwezel)

Bilmeyer and Van Riel also built a whole series of houses in Antwerp, such as:

- two houses nos. 37-39 in the Transvaalstraat in Berchem (Zurenborg district)(dd. 1884)
- the house Keulemans Verdussenstraat 37 (dd. 1885)
- three houses nrs. 16-18-20 in the Wolfstraat in Zurenborg (dd. 1889)
- two houses nrs. 20-22 in the Transvaalstraat in Berchem (district Zurenborg) (dd. 1889)
- three houses in the Kleine Hondstraat(corner Grote Hondstraat nrs 63-65) in Zurenborg (dd. 1890)
- a wide house in the Old Stock Exchange on nr 44 (dd 1890)
- two houses nos. 24-26 in the Transvaalstraat in Berchem (district Zurenborg)(dd. 1890)
- Three houses and 2(or3)stores in the Dambruggestraat nrs 91-93-95-97 (corner Lange Beeldekensstraat) (dd. 1890)
- house of painter Frans Snyders in the Keizerstraat 8 (1891)
- a dwelling group of 10 houses, Dolfijnstraat 46-64 at Zurenborg (dd. 1892)
- two houses nos. 45-47 in the Transvaalstraat in Berchem (district of Zurenborg)(dd. 1893)
- three houses and 2(or3)stores in Dambruggestraat nrs 91-93-95-97 (corner Lange Beeldekensstraat) (dd. 1890)
- house of painter Frans Snyders in the Keizerstraat 8 (1891)
- a dwelling group of 10 houses, Dolfijnstraat 46-64 at Zurenborg (dd. 1892)
- two houses nos. 45-47 in the Transvaalstraat in Berchem (district of Zurenborg)(dd. 1893)
- two houses in the St.-Hubertusstraat 84-86 in Berchem (dd. 1894)
- a number of houses nos. 49-51-53 in the Transvaalstraat in Berchem (district Zurenborg)(dd. 1895)
- a house in the Bouwmeestersstraat (dd. 1896)
- a house on the Meir (nr. 79) with the name 'Het Wapen van Spanje' (with statue by J.F. Deckers) (dd.1897)
- the Carolus-Magnus complex in the Cogels-Osylei in Berchem (Zurenborg district) (dd.1997)
- a house in the Provinciestraat 149 (dd. 1898)
- a house in Hopland 34-36 (dd. 1902). Now bookstore and wine bar Luddites (https://www.luddites.be)
- a house in St. Vincentiusstraat 6 in Antwerp (dd. 1902)
- five houses in Lange Lozana Street 135-141, built in 2 phases(dd. 1902 and 1903)
- four linked houses in the Rijnpoortvest 12-18 (design dd. 1904) see also mention VIOE id 5801
- a house in the St. Gummarusstraat 37 in Antwerp (dd. 1906) for Lambrechts
- corner house Schoenmarkt 10 & Schrijnwerkersstraat (dd. 1906)
- a house in the Volksstraat 60 (dd. 1907)
- a house in Nachtegaalstraat 37 (dd. 1907)
- four coupled houses in Rijnpoortvest 12-18 (design dd. 1904) see also entry VIOE id 5801
- a house in the St. Gummarusstraat 37 in Antwerp (dd. 1906) for Lambrechts
- corner house Schoenmarkt 10 & Schrijnwerkersstraat (dd. 1906)
- a house in the Volksstraat 60 (dd. 1907)
- a house in Nachtegaalstraat 37 (dd. 1907)
- fourteen houses in the Tabakvest, nos. 2-28, at Antwerp (dd. 1908)
- St Marcus and St Lucas Burgerhuis on Lijnwaadmarkt 20, at Antwerp (dd. 1913)

Other designs/realizations by Jules Bilmeyer in collaboration with Van Riel are:

- the gate frame at the residence of Nicolaas Rockox jr. in Keizerstraat, commissioned by antique dealer Grüter
- gate in neo-Flemish renaissance style in the Eikenstraat 20 in Antwerp (dd.1897)
- The neo-Gothic St. Willibrordus room in the Vredestraat in Berchem
- Restoration works at the Hof van Rameyen in Berlaar (dd.1906)
- The completion of the St. Amandus church (Antwerp) (according to the plans of Jan-Lodewijk Baeckelmans)
- Warehouse Stokerij de Fortuin, Brouwersvliet 29 in Antwerp.
- Renovation works for store and building above, Huidevetterstraat 18 in Antwerp.
- Renovation works pharmacy (now San Remo), Keyserlei 35 in Antwerp.

Interior

As architect responsible for the renovation of the Antwerp Cathedral, under his direction the neo-Gothic stalls, the high hall and the tympanum above the main entrance on the Handschoenmarkt side were executed, apart from other conservation works.

The church of Eppegem was restored by architect Jules Bilmeyer, but destroyed by fire and then rebuilt by son Edouard Bilmeyer (Antwerp, September 19, 1883 - Antwerp, April 17, 1948). The castle of the Cock de Rameyen in Gestel was also restored by Jules Bilmeyer. Furthermore, sketches by Bilmeyer have been found in the archive of Jan Stuyt regarding the realization of the design for the Cenacle Church in Nijmegen.

Early in 1895, Bilmeyer was a corresponding member of the Royal Commission of Landscapes and Monuments to become an effective member of this Commission in the middle of 1918. The architects' office at the time was located at Appelmansstraat 21-23 in Antwerp. Possibly they initially worked from a residence located in the Kardinaal Mercierlei in Berchem. As an employee at Bilmeyer and Van Riel, arch. Emile Thielens is mentioned. As students at the Academy, Bilmeyer mentored André Fivez, Jos Smolderen and Flor Van Reeth, among others.

The extant oeuvre is catalogued in the inventory of architectural heritage. This was drawn up by the Flemish Institute for Immovable Heritage.
