= Botanical Garden of Mechelen =

Public park in Mechelen, Belgium

Coordinates: 51°01′24″N 4°29′05″E

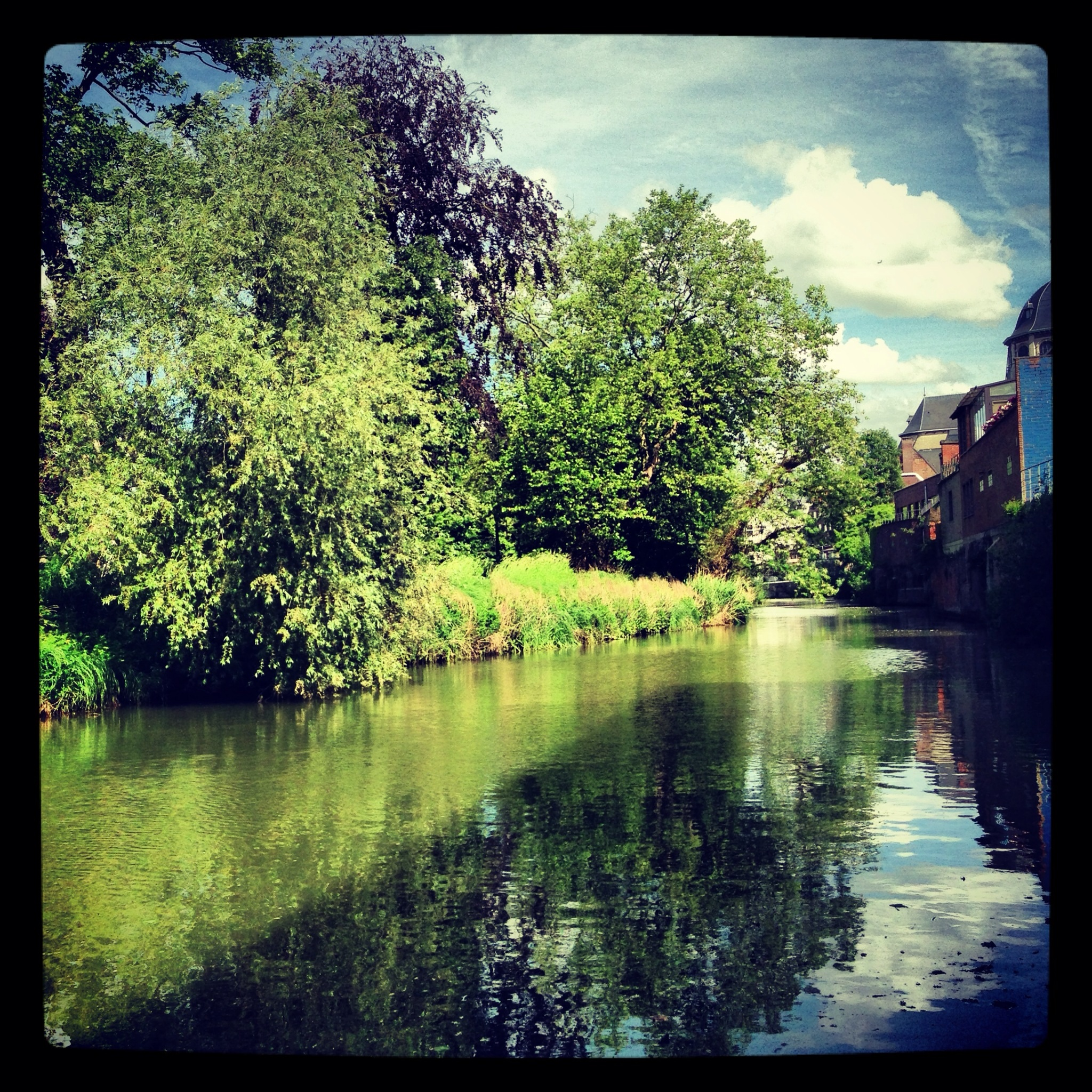
The botanical garden seen from the river

The Botanical Garden of Mechelen (Kruidtuin Mechelen) is the largest public park within the historic city centre of Mechelen, Belgium. It is located on the north bank of the River Dijle and is surrounded by educational establishments (two secondary-school campuses to the east and west, and the Kruidtuin campus of Thomas More University College to the north). Entrances are in the Bruul, the Pitzemburgstraat, and via a footpath from the Zandpoortvest.

== History ==
A horticultural society was established in Mechelen in 1837, and in 1839 obtained the use of the grounds of the former Teutonic Order Commandery of Pitzemburg. There they established a French formal garden, which opened to the public on 4 June 1840 with Joseph Van Hoorde as head gardener. In 1862 it was redesigned in the style of an English landscape garden by Louis Fuchs. After the First World War it became a municipal park. Extensive renovations were carried out in 2010–2018.

== Herb garden ==
Within the botanical garden there is a garden of medicinal and culinary herbs, with 250 specimens, laid out around a statue of the Renaissance botanist Rembert Dodoens and dedicated to his memory. It is maintained by an association of volunteers. The park as a whole is maintained by the municipality and contains footpaths, an open-air stage, and a children's playground.
