= 1851 Belgian general election =

Senate elections were held in Belgium on 27 September 1851. The snap elections (solely for the Senate) were called by Royal Order on 4 September, due to a lack of support among the wealthy senators for the introduction of an inheritance tax pushed for by the liberal Minister of Finance Walthère Frère-Orban.

The Liberal Party and Catholics won 27 seats each. Voter turnout was 64.0%, although only 79,296 people (1.8% of the population) were eligible to vote.

== Results ==
Party	Seats
Catholics	27
Liberal Party	27
Total	54
Source: Sternberger et al.
