= Charles-Philogène Tschaggeny =

Belgian painter

- Born: Charles-Philogène Tschaggeny ca. 1815; Brussels
- Died: ca. 1894; Sint-Joost-ten-Node, Belgium
- Occupation: Painter
- Relatives: Edmund Tschaggeny (brother)

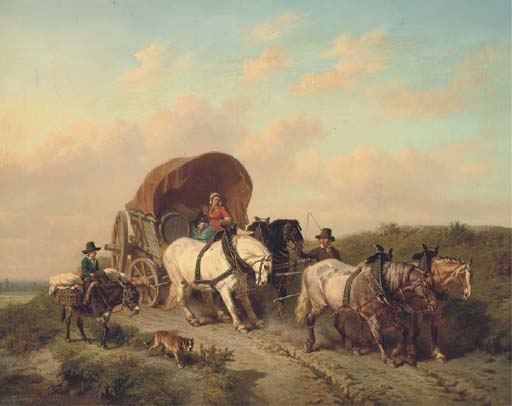
The unwilling traveler

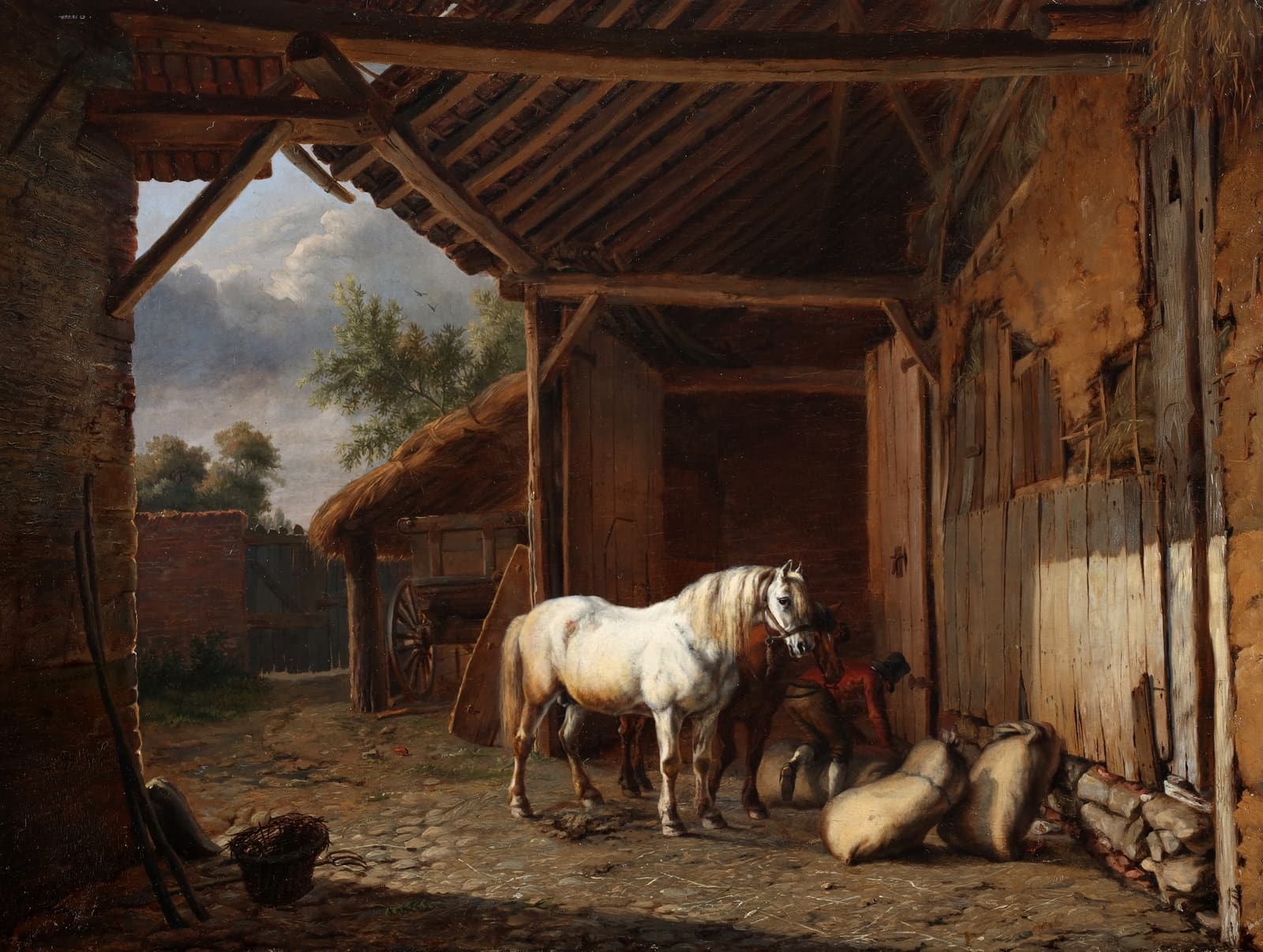
Horses on the inner court of a barn (1837), French collection

Charles-Philogène Tschaggeny (1815 – 1894), was a Belgian painter.

== Biography ==
He was born in Brussels and was the brother of Edmund Tschaggeny. He was the pupil of Eugène Joseph Verboeckhoven and is known for genre works with horses.

He died in Sint-Joost-ten-Node.
