= Lucien Solvay =

Belgian journalist, art historian and poet

Lucien Pierre Auguste Constant Solvay (7 October 1851 - 15 August 1950) was a Belgian journalist, art historian and poet. He was the first editor-in-chief of Le Soir.

== Life ==
Solvay was born in Saint-Josse-ten-Noode, Brussels, on 7 October 1851 to Théodore Jean Baptiste Solvay, a virtuoso pianist (and piano teacher to the Duke of Brabant), and Fanny Van Helmont, the last direct descendant of the alchemist Jan Baptist van Helmont. After dropping out of medical school he studied law at the Université libre de Bruxelles while also following classes at the Académie Royale des Beaux-Arts.

Rather than pursue either law or art professionally, he became a journalist and poet. He was associated with the periodicals La Gazette, La Nation, le Ménestrel de Paris, Le Soir, and others. During the Second World War he was a contributor to the collaborationist Cassandre, as a result of which he was expelled from the Royal Academy of Science, Letters and Fine Arts of Belgium on 25 May 1945.

He died in Ixelles (Brussels) on 15 August 1950.

== Works ==
- L'Art et la liberté (1881) – on art and liberty
- Belle-Maman (1884) – a novel
- Le Paysage et les paysagistes: Théodore Verstraete (1897) – on landscape in the work of Theodoor Verstraete
- L'Evolution théâtrale (2 vols., 1922) – on theatre history
- Le Golgotha (1923) – a novel
- Une vie de journaliste (1934) – autobiography
- Petites chroniques du temps présent (1938) – a collection of his journalism
- Mémoires d'un solitaire (1942) – autobiography

== Honours ==
- Member of the Royal Academy of Science, Letters and Fine Arts of Belgium.
