= Lucien Bia =

Belgian soldier and explorer

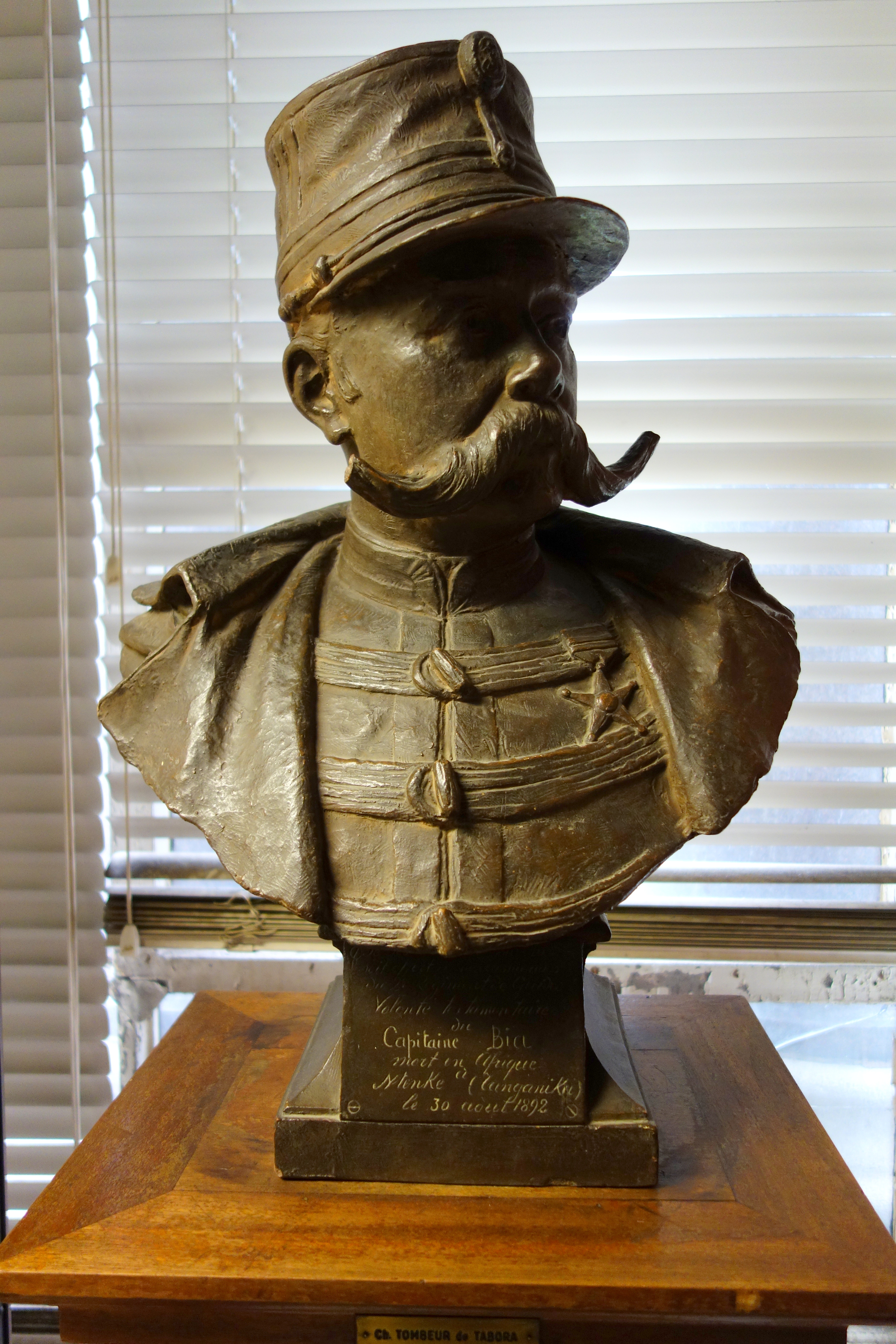
Captain Lucien Bia

Lucien Bia (2 December 1852 - August 30, 1892) was a Belgian soldier and explorer of the Congo.

Bia was born in Liège, and after a tumultuous adolescence enrolled in the Army in 1870 for the Franco-German wars. He set out for the Congo Free State on March 15, 1887, in service with the Compagnie du Katanga. In 1892, after several expeditions across the Congo, he was promoted to Commandant de caravane, and served as lead guide for geologist Jules Cornet into Katanga to study mineral deposits in the regions of Likasi (Jadotville) and Kambove. Bia died in the Congo after an illness, and was buried near the Ditakata hills.

== Selected works ==
- Katanga. Le Katanga avant les Belges et l'expédition Bia-Francqui-Cornet, by René J. Cornet, Lucien Bia, Jules Cornet, and Émile Francqui.
