= Jan van Beers (poet) =

Belgian poet (1821–1888)

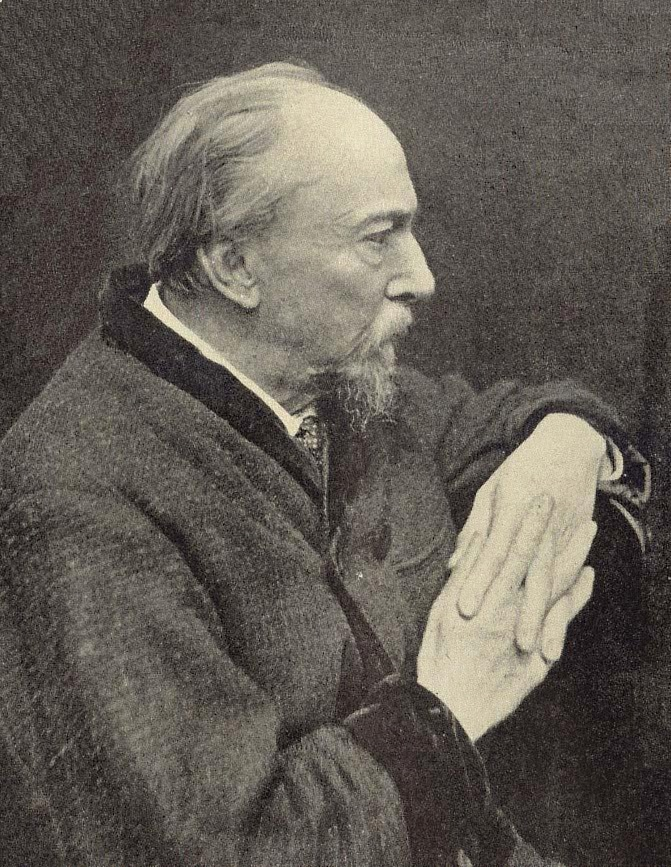
- Jan van Beers
- Born: 22 February 1821; Antwerp, United Kingdom of the Netherlands
- Died: 14 November 1888 (aged 67); Antwerp, Belgium
- Occupation: poet

Jan van Beers (22 February 1821 – 14 November 1888) was a Belgian poet born in Antwerp. He is usually referred to as "van Beers the elder" to distinguish him from his son, Jan van Beers (1852–1927), the painter.

== Background ==
Van Beers was essentially a Netherlander, though politically a Belgian, expressing his thoughts in the same language as any North Netherland writer. In fact, the poems of Jan van Beers are perhaps more popular in the Netherlands than in Belgium, and for many of them there exist more editions printed in the Netherlands than in his political fatherland.

== Early life ==
Van Beers started life as a teacher of Dutch language and literature, first at Mechelen, then at Lier, and in 1860 was appointed a professor of both at the Athenaeum (high school) in Antwerp, where he had also been a sub-librarian in the communal library. Van Beers as a teacher was early in the field, with Hendrik Conscience, Willems and others, when the Flemish movement began. He composed a Dutch grammar (1852), which, in enlarged editions, still holds the field, and a volume of selections from Dutch authors, both books being so much appreciated that the Belgian government made them textbooks in the public schools.

== Poetical works ==
Van Beers' historical poems, the principal of which is, perhaps, Jakob Van Maerlant (Amsterdam, 1860), helped the Flemish revival in Belgium as powerfully as his school-books. He is best known, however, as the writer of ballads and songs. Jongelingsdroomen ("A Young Man's Dreams") first appeared at Antwerp and Amsterdam in 1853. These poems were followed by Levensbeelden ("Life Figures or Pictures," Amsterdam, 1858) and by Gevoel en Leven ("Feeling Living," Amsterdam, 1869). His Rijzende Blaren ("Rising Leaves") first made its appearance at Ghent and Rotterdam in 1883.

In the following year an edition de luxe of his poetry was published, adorned with pen-and-ink sketches by Jan van Beers the younger, and a popular edition of his collected poems was published at Ghent and Rotterdam in 1873 and 1884. Among the best known are De Blinde ("Blind"), De Zieke Jongeling ("Young and Doomed"), Bij 't Kerkportaal ("At the Church Porch"). Van Beers's poetry, full of glow and pathos, simple yet forcible, is somewhat akin to that of Longfellow.

Van Beers has been described as being typically Flemish in his sincere and moral outlook on life.

== Works ==
- Jongelingsdromen (1853)
- De blinde (1854)
- Blik door een venster (1855)
- Lijkkrans voor Tollens (1856)
- Levensbeelden (1858)
- Jacob Van Maerlant (1860)
- Gevoel en leven (1869)
- Peter Benoit. De oorlog (1873)
- Het hoofdgebrek van ons middelbaar onderwijs (1879)
- Rijzende blaren (1884)
- Gedichten (1921)

== See also ==
- Flemish literature

== References and sources ==
Attribution:
