= Alexander Struys =

Belgian painter (1852–1941)

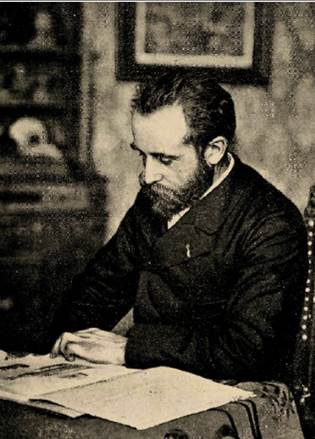
- Alexander Struys in his study (c.1894)
- Born: 24 January 1852; Berchem, Belgium
- Died: 25 March 1941 (aged 89); Uccle, Belgium
- Education: Academy of Dordrecht
- Occupation: Painter

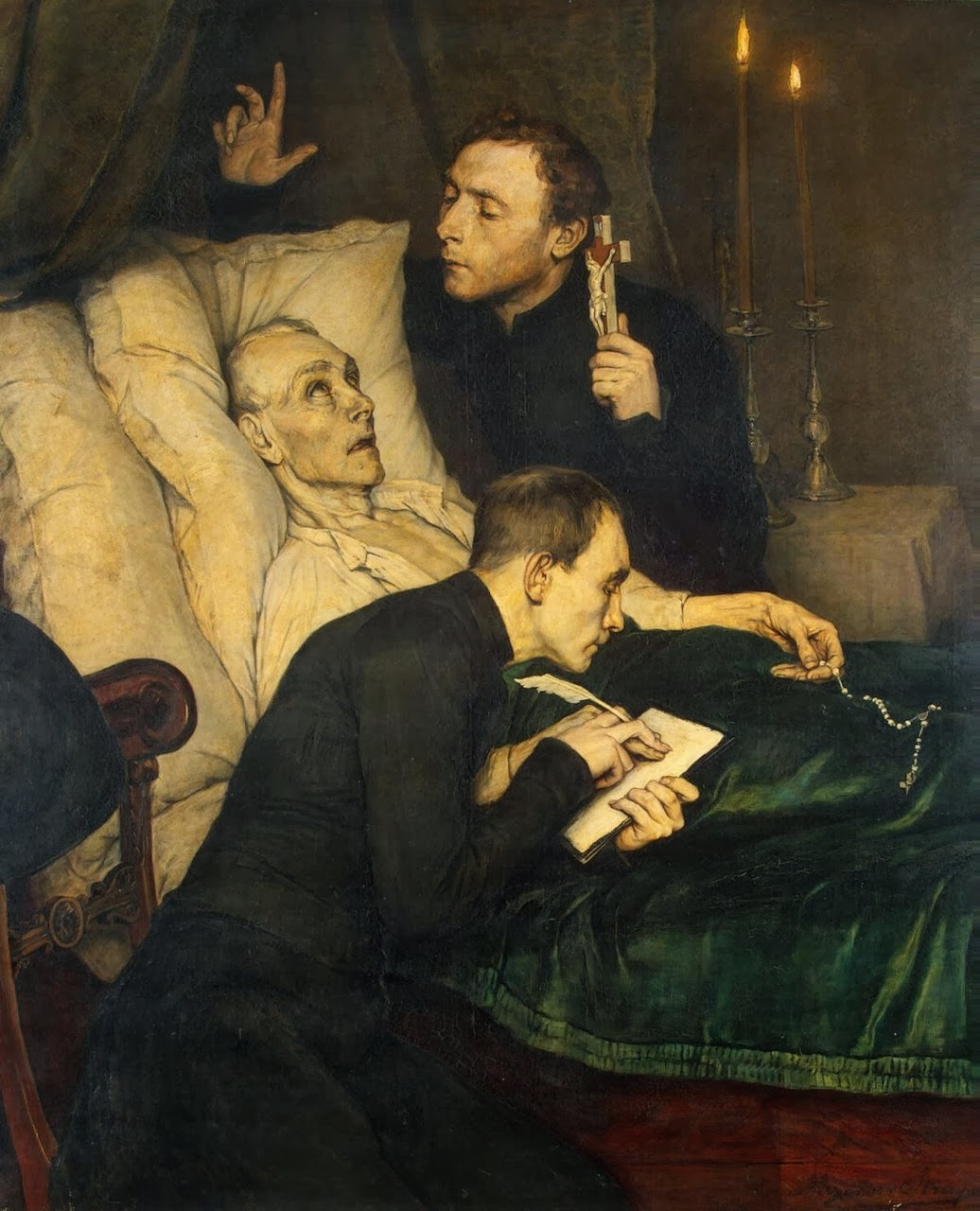
Birds of Prey (1876)

Alexander Theodore Honoré Struys (24 January 1852, Berchem – 25 March 1941, Uccle) was a Belgian genre and portrait painter in the Realistic style.

== Biography ==
Struys' father (originally from Holland) was a master glass painter. At the age of six, he was already a student at the Academy of Dordrecht. Later, Struys was a student of Polydore Beaufaux and Jozef Van Lerius at the Royal Academy of Fine Arts. In 1871, he exhibited in Ghent and travelled with Jan Van Beers to France and England, where they attempted to sell their works, but barely made enough to get back home. His anti-clerical painting, "Birds of Prey" (or "God is Dead", in Dutch), created a scandal in 1876.

The year after, Struys was named a Professor at the Weimar Saxon-Grand Ducal Art School, following in the steps of his fellow Belgians, Charles Verlat (recently the school's Director) and Ferdinand Pauwels. One of his best-known students there was Christian Rohlfs. He remained in that position until 1882, when he moved to The Hague and worked as a portrait painter for two years, after which he went back to Belgium.

Working without a studio, Struys painted in the homes of the poor people he depicted. His work attracted much attention and praise in the more socially conscious publications of that time, and he became a close friend of Jakob Smits, who was also involved in social issues. Some less sympathetic commentators referred to him as the "painter of misery and pain".

Struys settled in Mechelen and became head of the Royal Drawing Academy there. In 1902, he joined the administrative commission for the ninth exhibition by the "Société des Beaux-Arts à Bruxelles" and, three years later, became Vice-President of the "Société Royale des Beaux-Arts". That same year, he also served on the committee charged with preparing the "Exposition Rétrospective de l'Art Belge"; part of the country's 75th anniversary celebrations. He was also a member of the Académie Royale de Belgique and the Institut de France.
