= Paul-François Huart-Chapel =

Belgian industrialist and politician

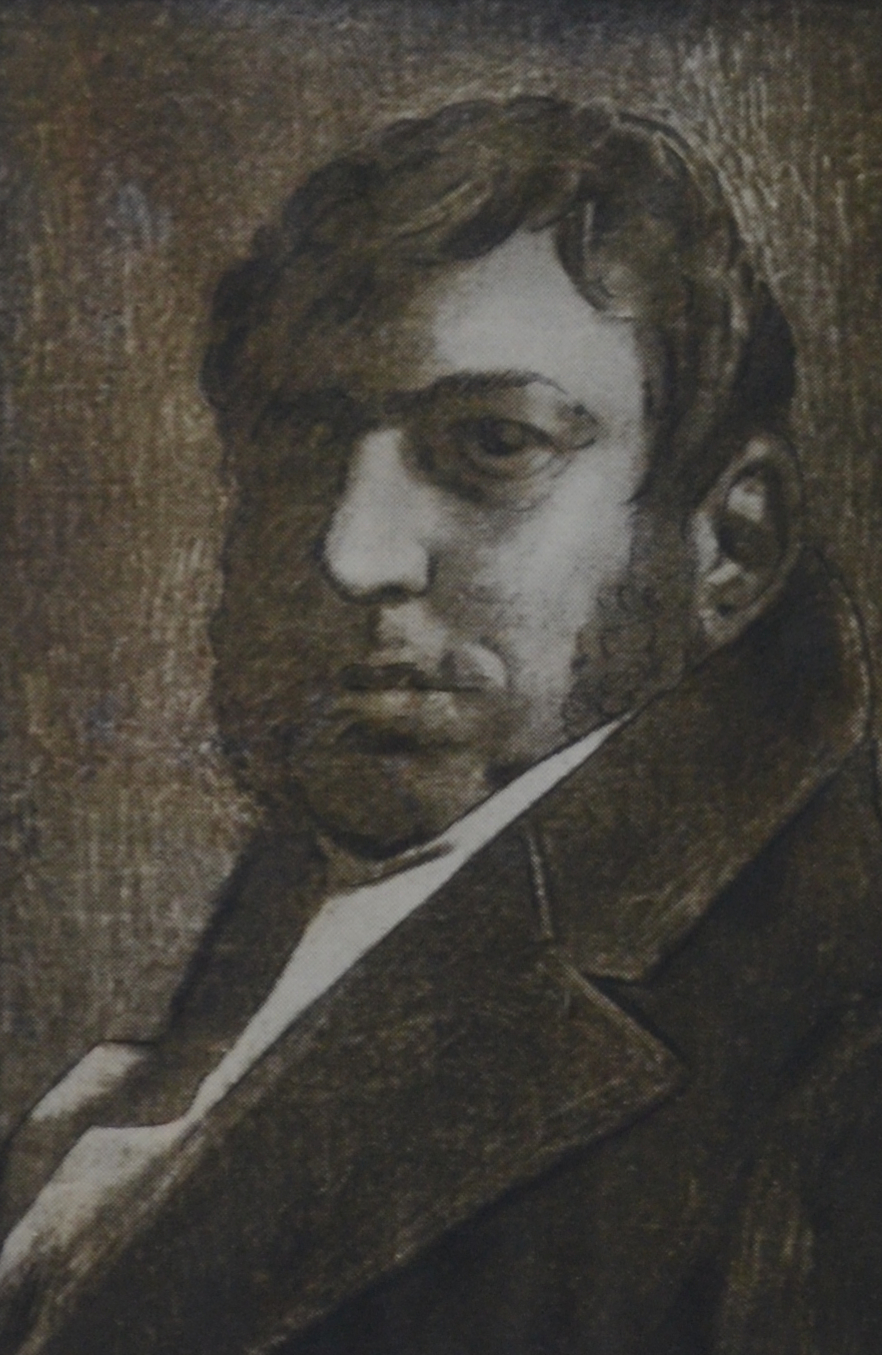
- Born: 1770
- Died: 1850

Paul-François Huart-Chapel (1770–1850), was a Belgian industrialist and politician.

He was born in Charleroi. He married Mary Chapel, the daughter of an industrialist.

In 1806 he inherited the factories of the Chapel family. He introduced a reverbatory furnace for melting metal in 1807 and then in 1821 he used the first Puddling furnace in Belgium (with J.M. Orban).

Shortly after John Cockerill had built the first blast furnace in Belgium in Liege, he built a coke fired blast furnace in 1827 in Charleroi. It was 12m high and produced 6 to 10tonnes of pig iron a day.

Between 1831 and 1834 he was the Mayor of Charleroi. He died aged 80.
