= Joseph Van Hoorde =

Belgian horticulturalist (1818–1853)

- Born: 13 September 1818; Gentbrugge, Belgium
- Died: 12 February 1853 (aged 34); Mechelen, Belgium
- Occupation: Horticulturist
- Known for: First head gardener of the Botanical Garden of Mechelen

Joseph Van Hoorde (13 September 1818 – 12 February 1853) was a Belgian horticulturalist, first head gardener of the Botanical Garden of Mechelen.

== Life ==
Van Hoorde was born in Gentbrugge on 13 September 1818, the son of a gardener. At sixteen he was apprenticed to a horticulturalist in Ghent, later going on to work in Paris. In 1837 a horticultural society was founded in Mechelen, which in 1839 was granted the use of the garden of the former commandery of Pitzemburg. On 4 June 1840 the city's new botanical garden was opened to the public, with Van Hoorde as head gardener. The greenhouses, built in 1851, were to his design. He died in Mechelen on 12 February 1853, holding a white camellia japonica that he had bred and with which he asked to be buried. A white marble plaque in the main greenhouse of the garden is engraved with a camellia in his memory. By crossing strains he bred a dwarf araucaria imbricata.
