= 1850 Belgian general election =

← 1848	11 June 1850	1852 →

54 of the 108 seats in the Chamber of Representatives 55 seats needed for a majority
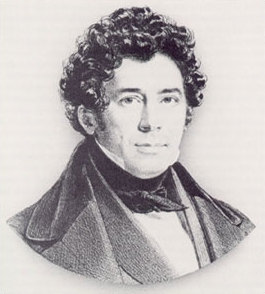

	First party	Second party
Leader	Charles Rogier
Party	Liberal	Catholic
Leader since	Candidate for PM
Seats before	83 seats	25 seats
Seats won	32	22
Seats after	69	39
Seat change	▼14	▲14
Popular vote	15,320	11,618
Percentage	54.80%	41.56%
Government before election
Rogier I
Liberal
Government after election
Rogier I
Liberal

Partial general elections were held in Belgium on 11 June 1850. In the Chamber of Representatives elections the result was a victory for the Liberal Party, who won 69 of the 108 seats. Voter turnout was 69.1%, although only 40,435 people were eligible to vote.

Under the alternating system, elections were only held in five out of the nine provinces: Antwerp, Brabant, Luxembourg, Namur and West Flanders.

== Results ==
=== Chamber of Representatives ===
Party	Votes	%	Seats		
Party	Votes	%	Won	Total	+/–
Liberal Party	15,320	54.80	32	69	–14
Catholics	11,618	41.56	22	39	+14
Others	1,016	3.63	0	0	0
Total	27,954	100.00	54	108	0
Total votes	27,954	–			
Registered voters/turnout	40,435	69.13			
Source: Mackie & Rose, Sternberger et al.
