= Jan van Beers (artist) =

19th and 20th-century Belgian artist

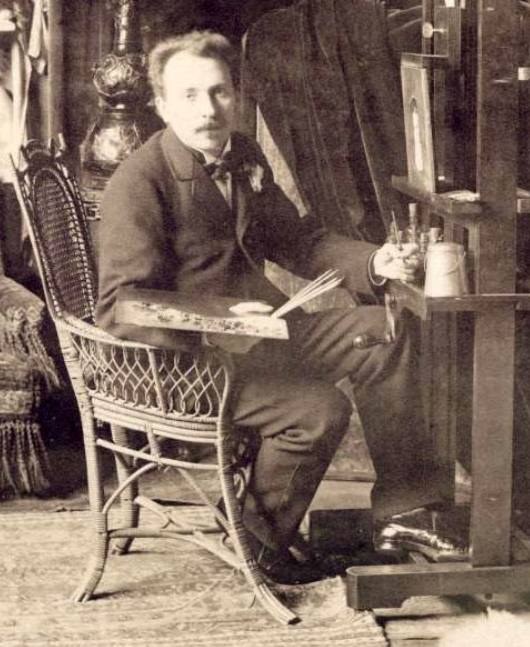
- Van Beers in his studio, Paris, late 1880s
- Born: Joannes Maria Constantinus Josephus Van Beers; 27 March 1852; Lier, Belgium
- Died: 17 November 1927 (aged 75); Fay-aux-Loges, France
- Known for: Painter, illustrator

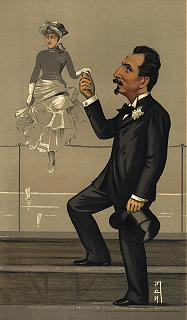
An 1891 Vanity Fair caricature of Van Beers titled "The Modern Wiertz"

Jean Marie Constantin Joseph "Jan" van Beers (27 March 1852 – 17 November 1927) was a Belgian painter and illustrator, son of the poet Jan van Beers. They are sometimes referred to as Jan van Beers the elder and Jan van Beers the younger. In 1884, Jan Van Beers produced the pen-and-ink sketches for the edition de luxe of his father's poetry.

== Early life ==
Van Beers studied at the Royal Academy of Fine Arts in Antwerp. Soon afterwards, he became the leader of a group of young artists, the "Van Beers clique." This group included the artists Piet Verhaert (1852–1908), Alexander Struys (1852–1941), and Jef Lambeaux (1852–1908). They were well known for their mischievous and eccentric behaviour, including walking around Antwerp dressed in historic costumes.

Van Beers began his career as a history painter, producing works relating to the Renaissance. These included Funeral of Charles the Good, which was so large and contained so many figures that van Beers said he only recouped the costs of production, despite selling it for 12,000 Francs.

== Ladies of Paris ==
In 1880 he moved to Paris and immediately abandoned historical pictures, producing instead genre and portrait works of the middle classes and developing a successful line in attractive draped young ladies reading a letter or a book or day-dreaming about a lover. Van Beers said that he wanted to paint what he saw and what were the best and most interesting things that one saw in Paris but her women? He explained in an 1893 interview for the Westminster Budget that "all my pictures are from models, and I know where to find them whenever I want them. It requires a good deal of diplomacy to get them to pose. One has to pet and coax them, and even then they often leave you in the lurch."

Vanity Fair showed him with a typical subject in their 1891 caricature titled "The Modern Wiertz" (Antoine Wiertz, 1806–65). Van Beers' work was often compared to that of his Belgian predecessor, particularly the more macabre and grotesque elements. In his novel Tess of the d'Urbervilles, Thomas Hardy mentions "the staring and ghastly attitudes of a Wiertz Museum and with the leer of a study by Van Beers".

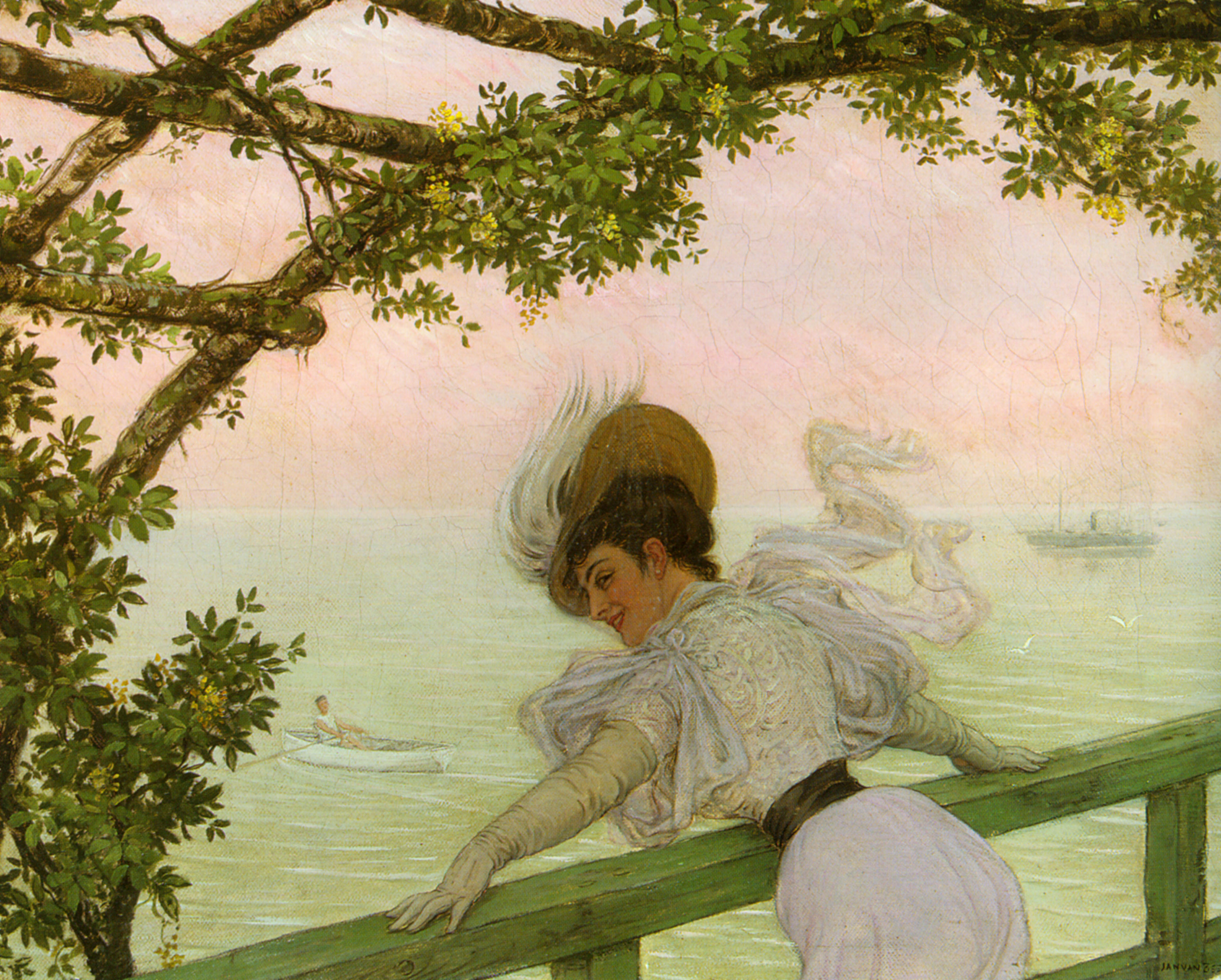
A balcony, undated

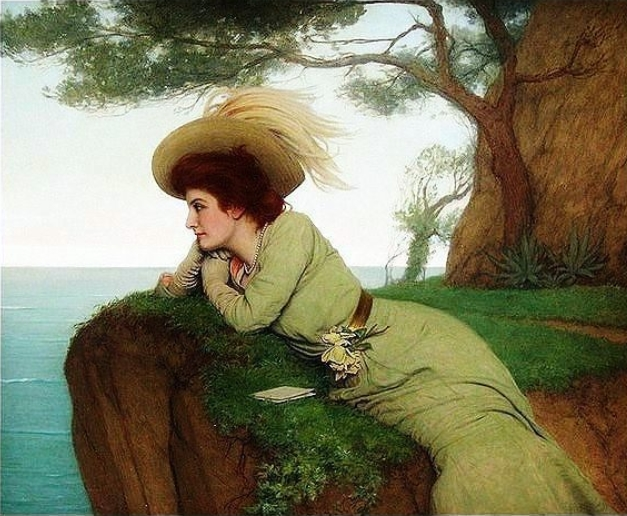
The letter, 1885

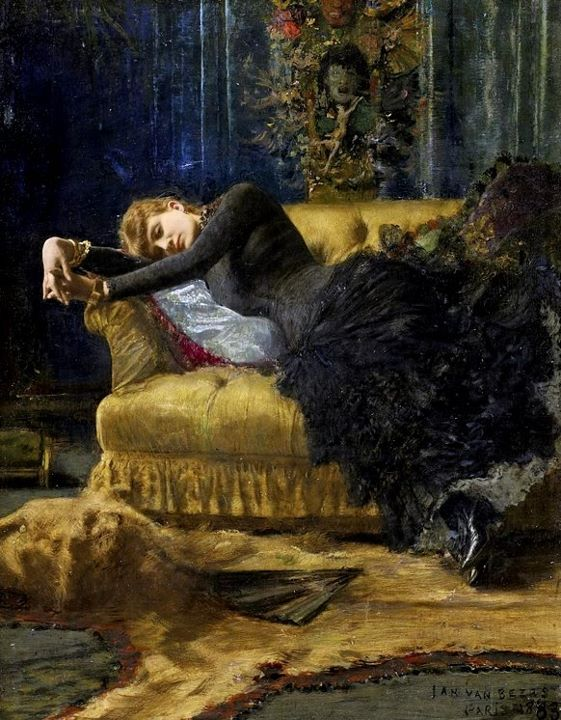
Portrait of a young woman, 1883

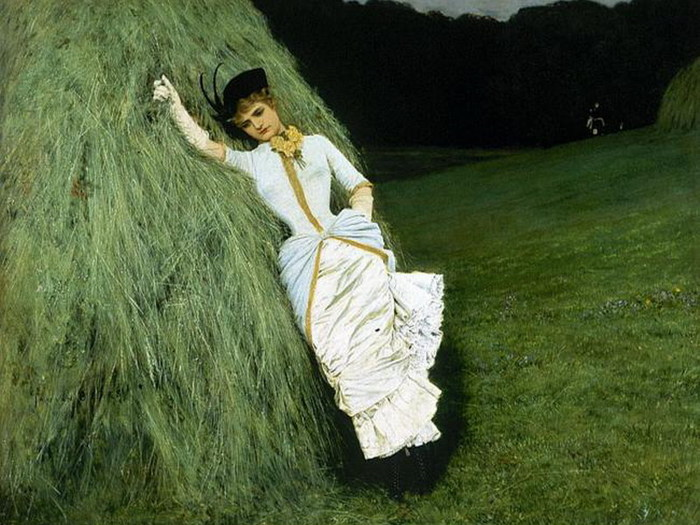
With thoughts of him, undated

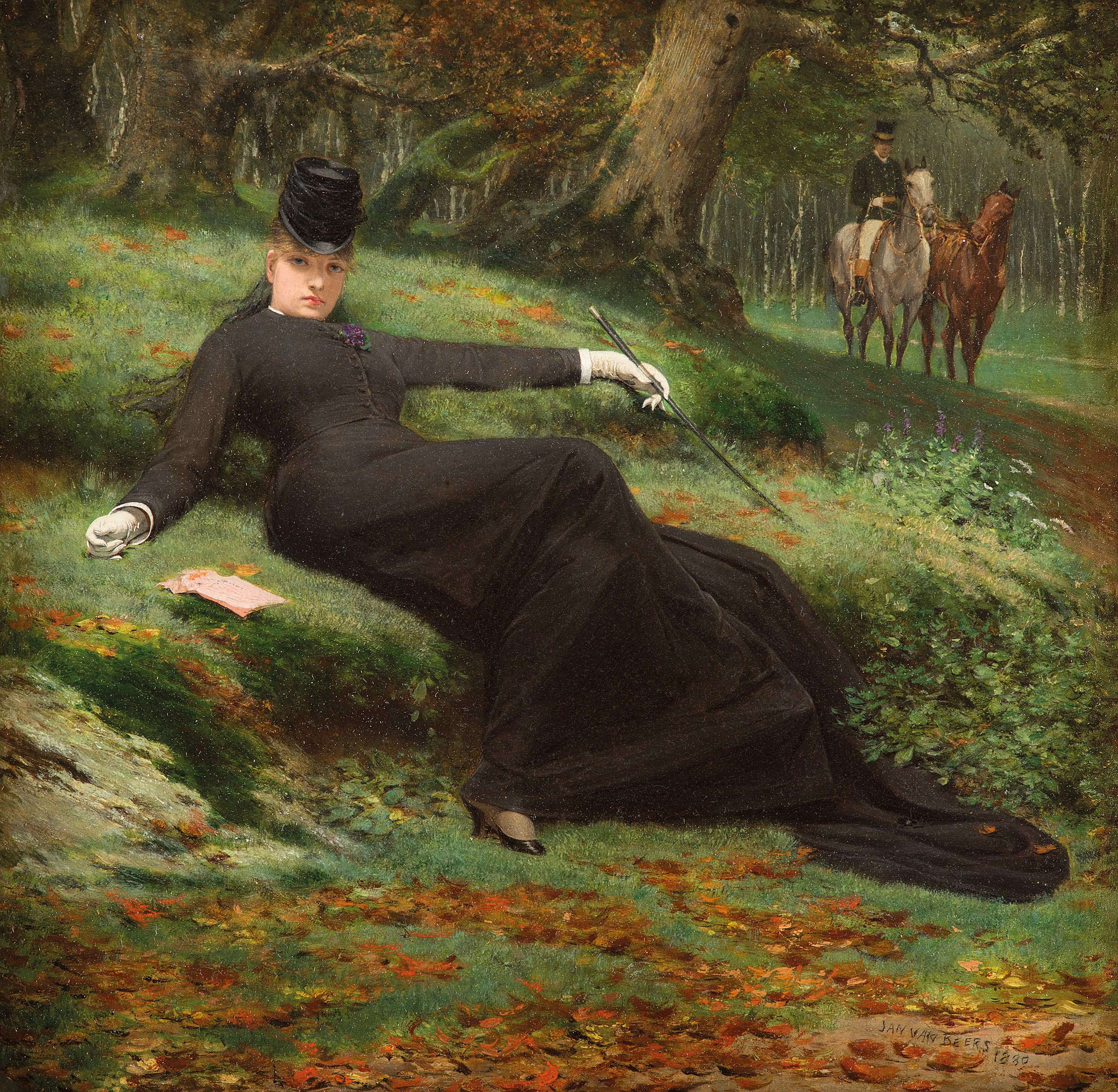
Rendez-vous in the Bois de Boulogne, 1889

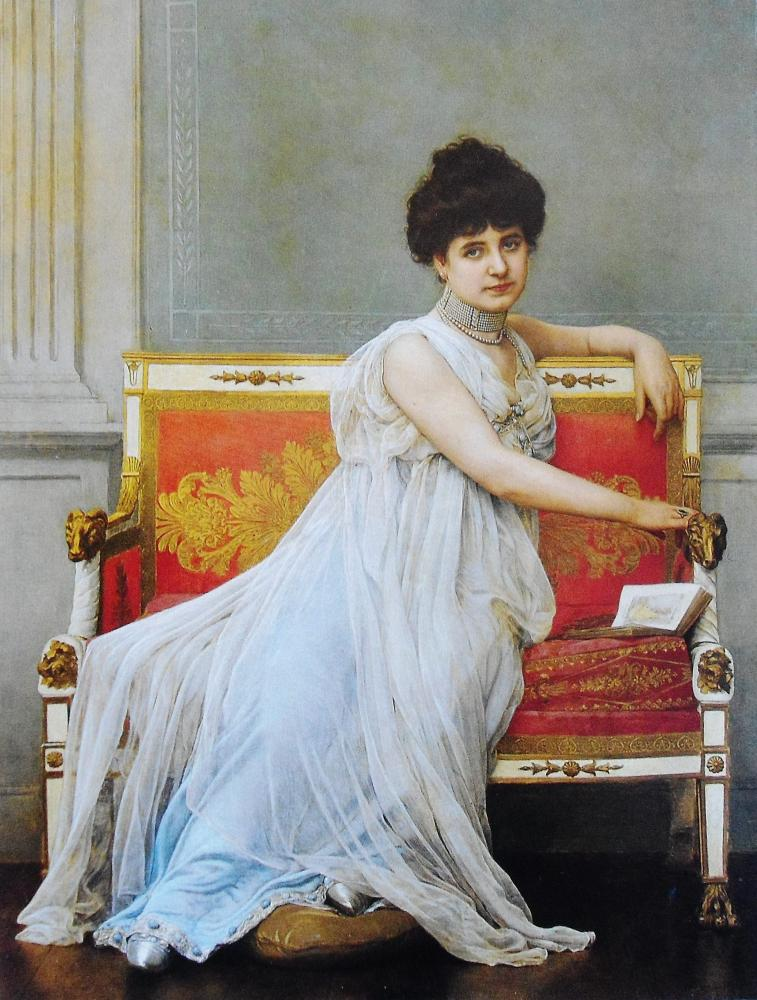
Portrait of a noble woman, 1880s

In Paris, Van Beers began construction of a house, off the Avenue du Bois de Boulogne, where each room was to be of a different design. The project was controversial and people said that it was the work of a madman.

== Other paintings ==
In addition to Van Beers' languid ladies, he painted a number of portraits of men, genre scenes and pictures in an orientalist style. Five hand-coloured chromolithographs of his paintings are used in the screens in The Flask public house in Hampstead, London.

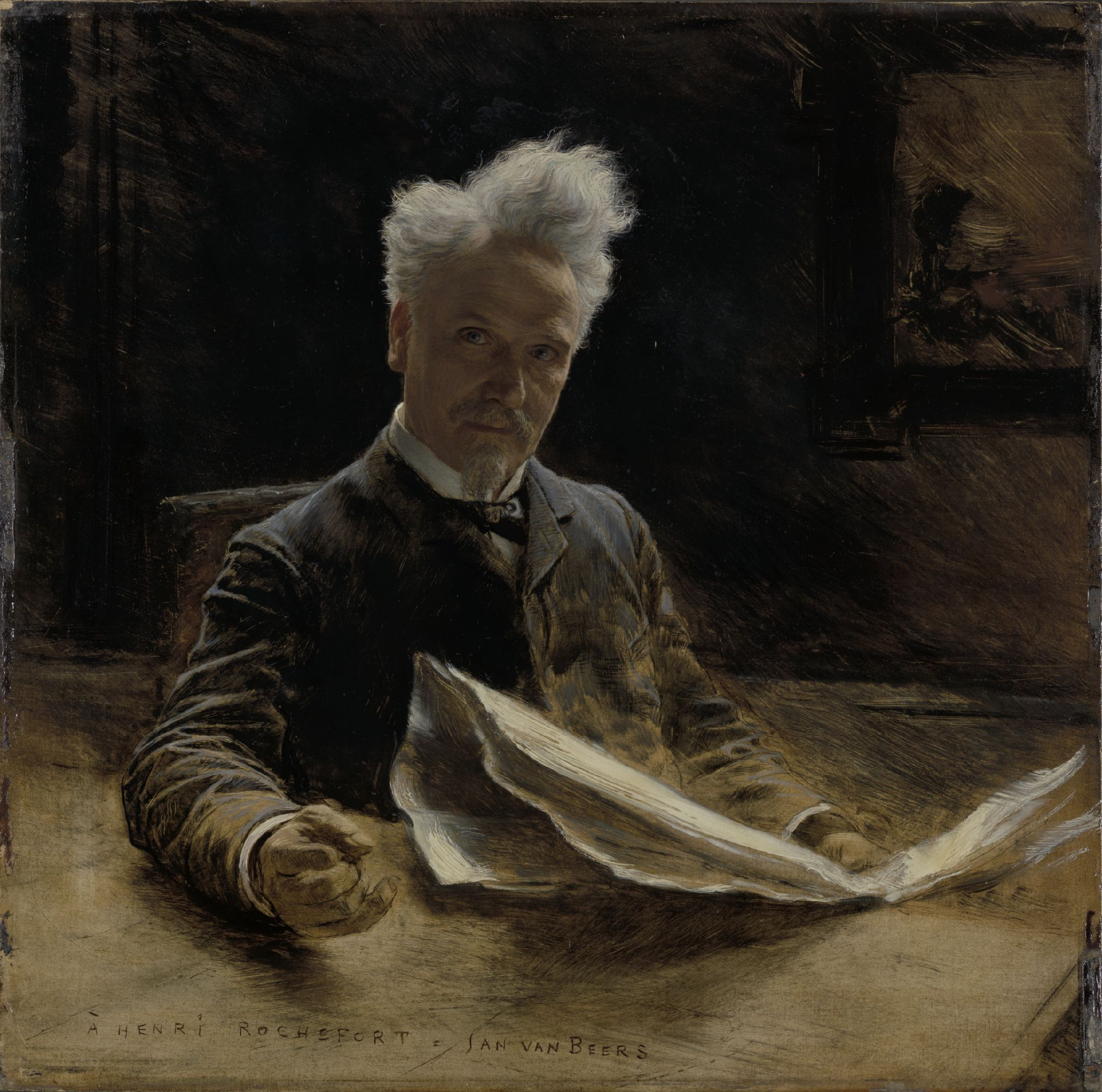
Henri Rochefort, undated.

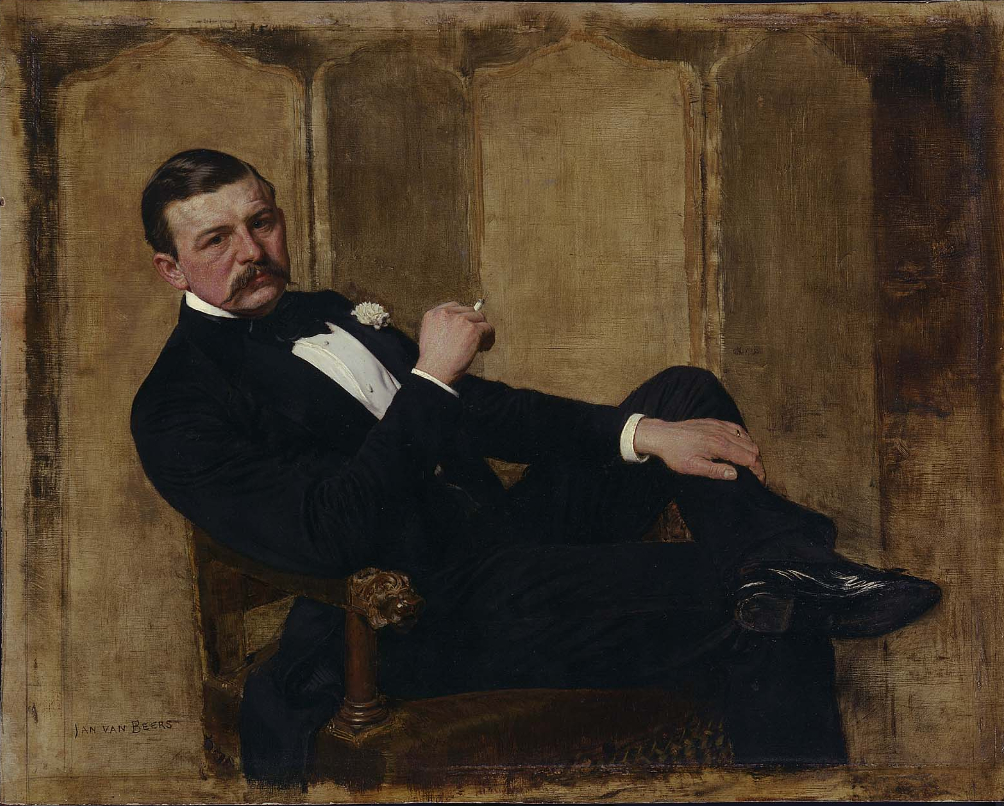
Portrait of a man, undated. Possibly Franz von Wertheim, Jr.

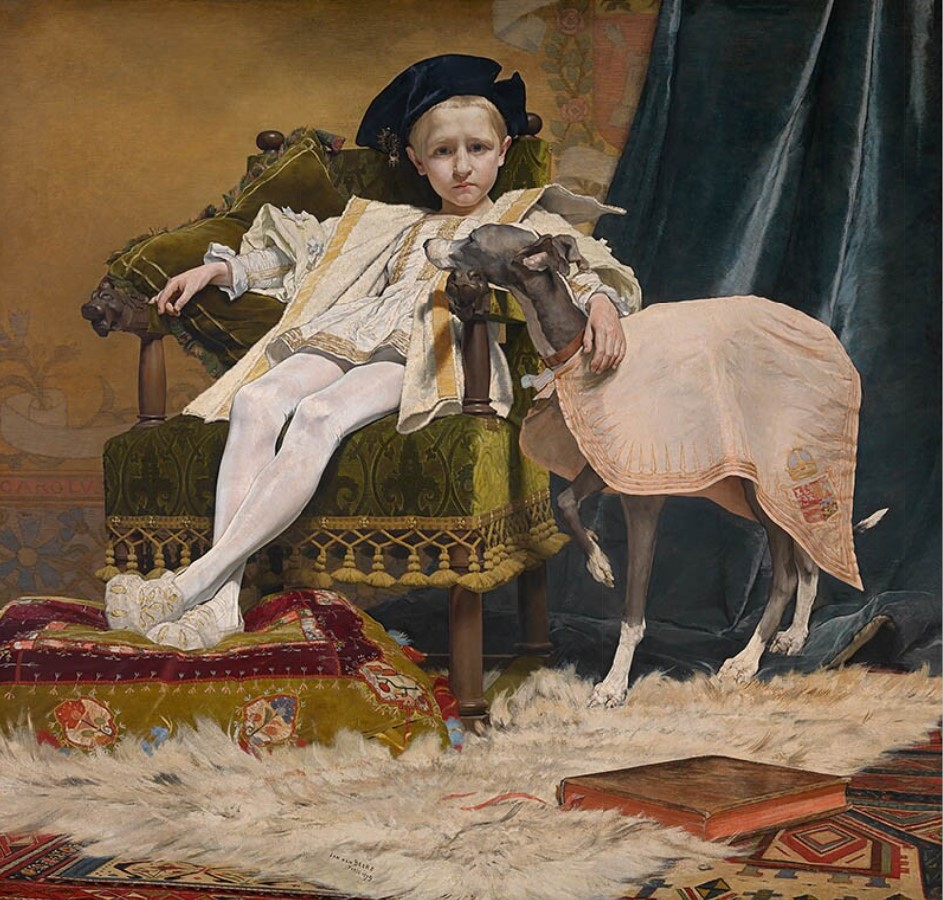
Emperor Charles V as a child, 1879

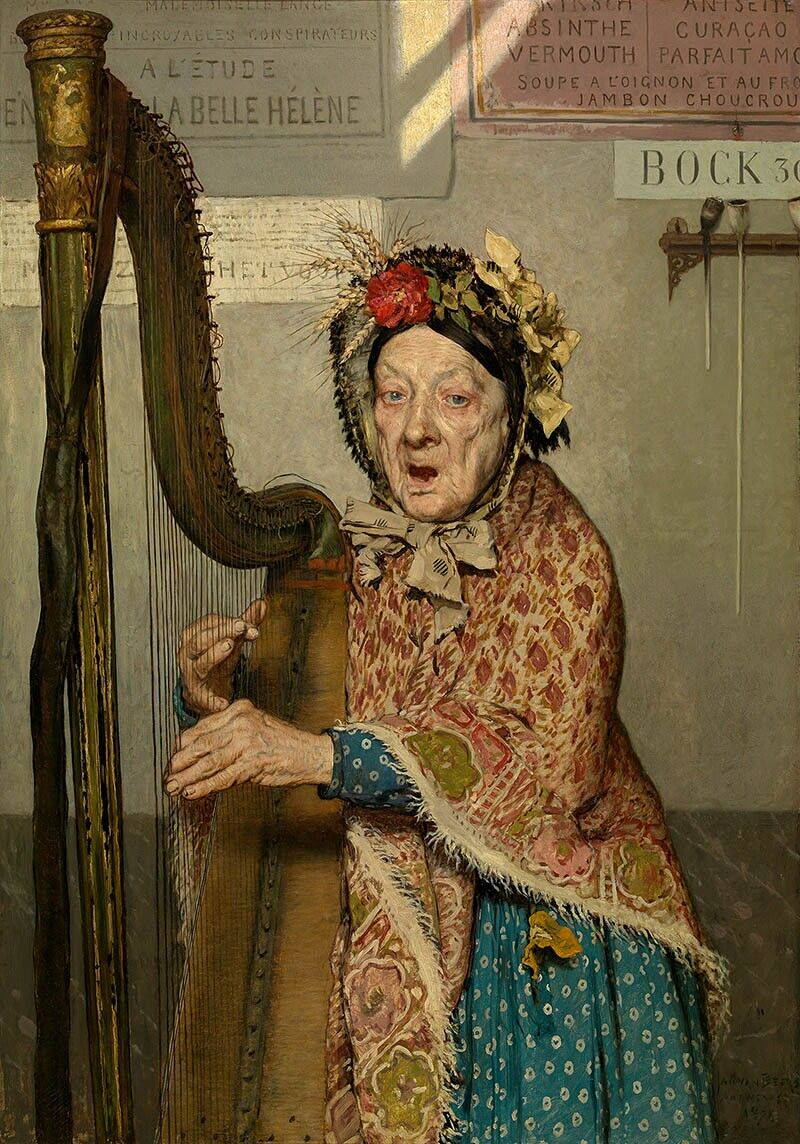
When stars set

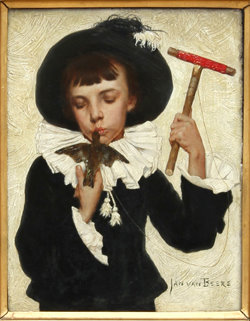
Boy with hummingbird

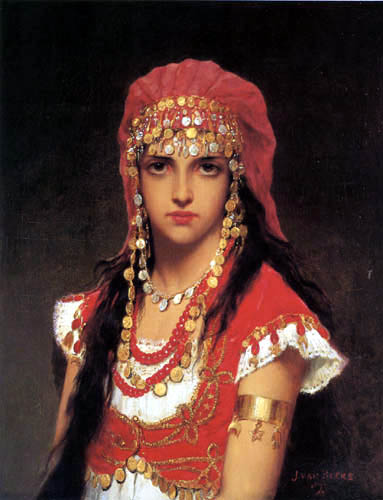
Remembrance

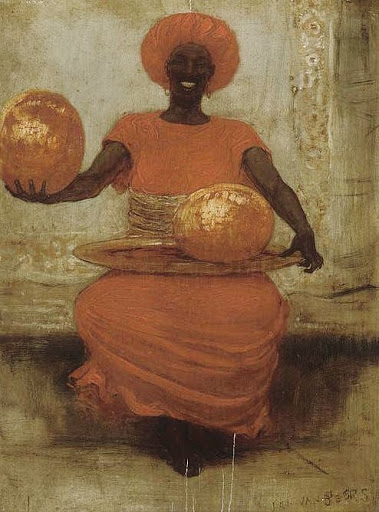
The melon seller

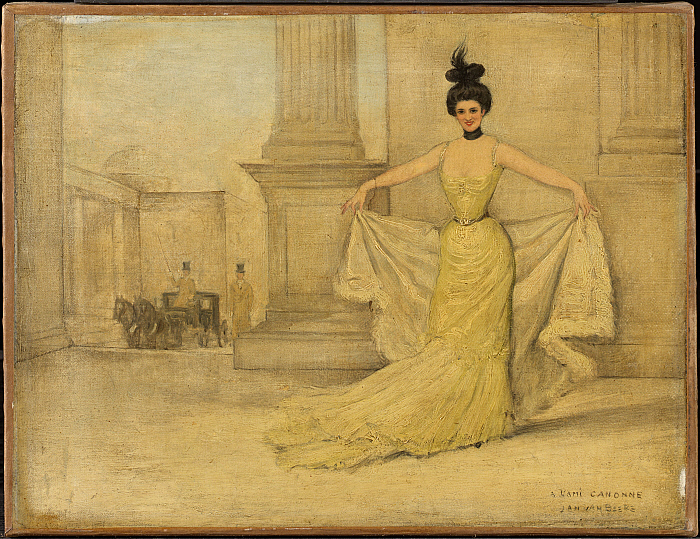
Woman in Evening Dress (after 1882), Oil on canvas, 10 13/16 x 14 in. (27.4 x 35.6 cm), Clark Art Institute

== Commercial illustrations ==
Van Beers was an active commercial illustrator and his work featured in posters and advertising.

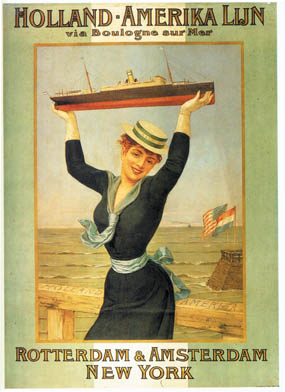
1898 poster

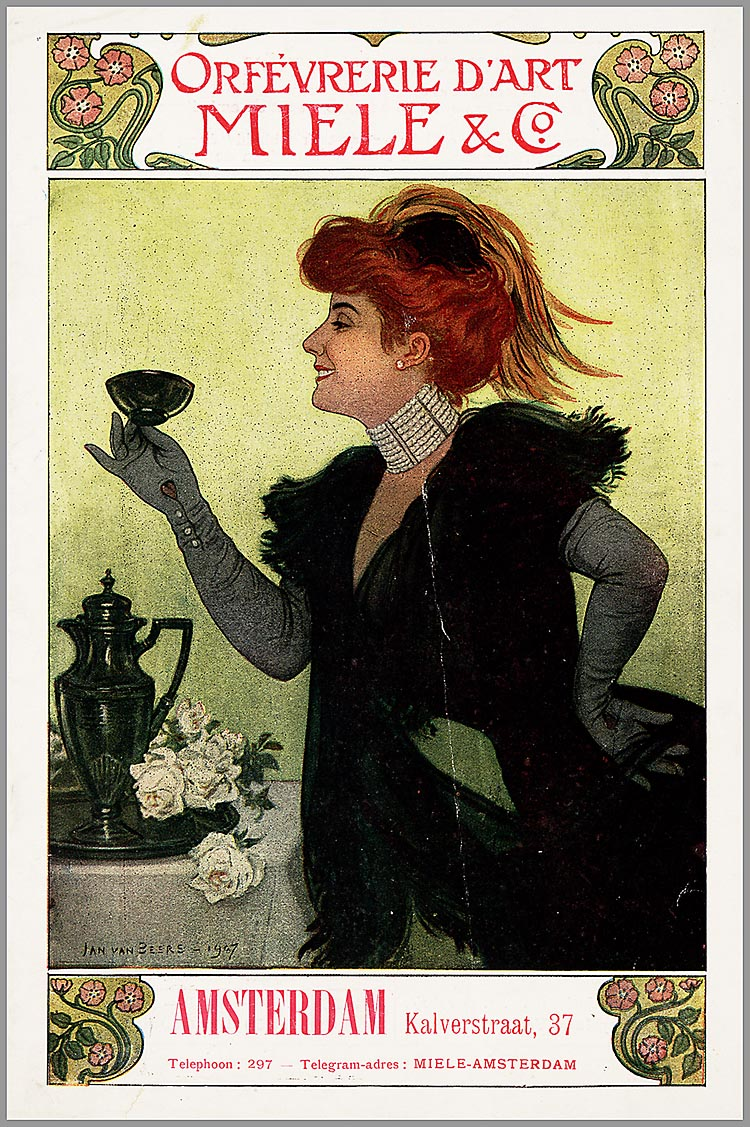
Commercial illustration, 1907

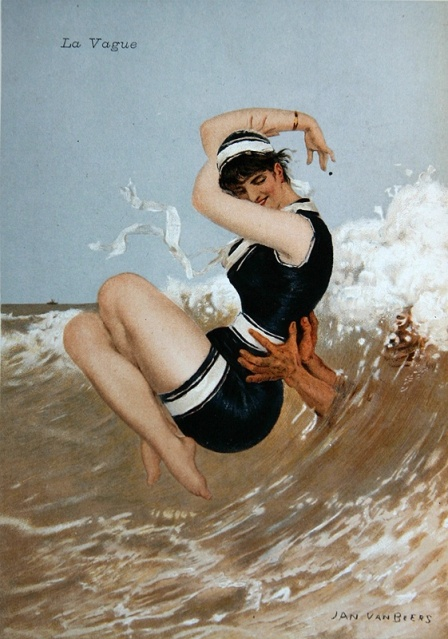
La vague (The wave)

== Controversy and criticism ==
Van Beers' work was not always well received and he was sometimes criticised for vulgarity. In 1879, Huysmans described Van Beers' submission to that year's Salon as "demented colours, absurd and crazy notions, a hotch-potch of ancient and modern mixed up on a single canvas".

In 1881, van Beers exhibited two works at the Brussels Salon, both painted in his new hyperrealistic miniature style. One, a painting of the yacht "Sirene", was suspected by the critics Max Sülzberger, Georges De Mons and Lucien Solvay of being a "photo-peinture", a painting created over a photograph. The Review de l'Art Moderne defended van Beers, suggesting that the critics and other artists were jealous of his commercial success. Van Beers suggested that experts could scrape off the paint to determine the truth of the allegations. A semi-official investigation followed, and eventually van Beers started legal proceedings. "L'affaire Van Beers" gave him Europe-wide attention. The eventual report found in his favour and that he was "an honest man". Previously a largely unknown artist, van Beers was able to use his newfound fame to sell his work for large sums.
