= Edouard Mary =

Belgian social reformer and member of parliament

Edouard André Joseph Mary (1796–1853) was a Belgian social reformer and member of parliament.

== Life ==
Mary was born in Enghien on 26 April 1796. He graduated Licentiate of Laws and from 1822 to 1825 served as second secretary to the permanent commission of the welfare association of the southern provinces of the United Kingdom of the Netherlands. He continued to promote social and educational reforms. In the first parliamentary elections after Belgian independence he was elected a member of the Chamber of Representatives for the constituency of Soignies. He failed to win re-election in the 1833 election. In 1843 he was appointed to the provincial statistical commission of the province of Brabant. He died in Brussels on 30 April 1853.

== Writings ==
- Epîtres en vers sur la Belgique (1850)
