= Eugène Siberdt =

Belgian painter

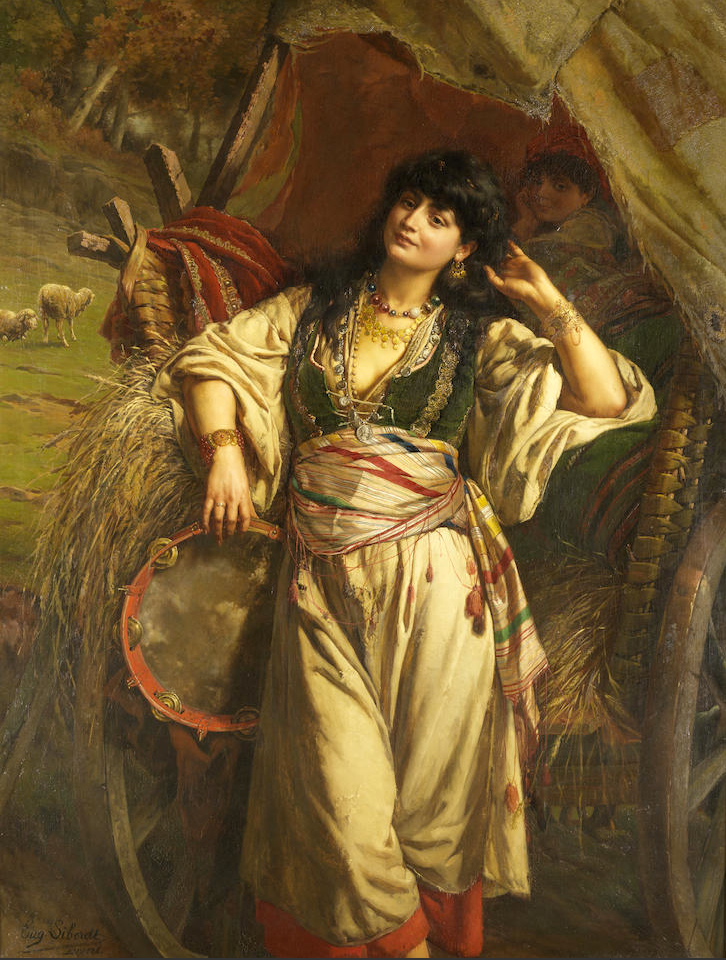
A halt of Bohemians

Eugène Siberdt, Eugeen Siberdt or Eugène François Joseph Siberdt (Antwerp, 21 April 1851 – Antwerp, 6 January 1931) was a Belgian Academic, late-Romantic painter who created portraits, history paintings, genre scenes and Orientalist paintings. He is now mainly known as the professor of drawing at the Antwerp Academy whose conflict with Vincent van Gogh led to van Gogh leaving the Antwerp Academy after only three months of attendance.

== Life ==
Eugène Siberdt was born in Antwerp where he trained at the Antwerp Academy under Edward Du Jardin, Polydore Beaufaux, Van Lerius and Nicaise de Keyser.

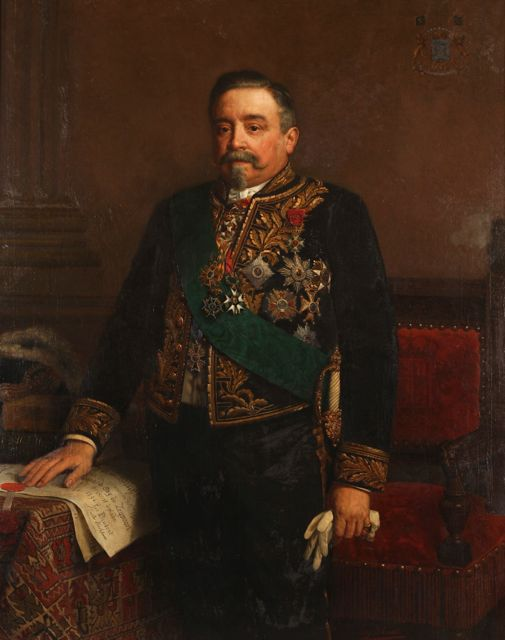
Governor baron Edward Osy de Zegwaart

He was awarded the Prix de Rome (Second Place) in 1873. From 1874, Siberdt commenced exhibiting at all the important Belgian salons with success. He was a successful portrait painter and became the Official Royal Portraitist.

Siberdt was appointed a professor at the Antwerp Academy in 1883. Vincent van Gogh started to attend drawing classes after plaster models at the Antwerp Academy on 18 January 1886. Here van Gogh quickly got into trouble with Charles Verlat, the director of the Academy and teacher of a painting class, because of his unconventional painting style. Van Gogh had also clashed with the instructor of the drawing class Franz Vinck. Van Gogh finally started to attend the drawing classes after antique plaster models given by Siberdt. Soon Siberdt and van Gogh came into conflict when the latter did not comply with Siberdt's requirement that drawings express the contour and concentrate on the line. When van Gogh was required to draw the Venus de Milo during a drawing class, he produced the limbless, naked torso of a Flemish peasant woman. Siberdt regarded this as defiance against his artistic guidance and made corrections to van Gogh’s drawing with his crayon so vigorously that he tore the paper. Van Gogh then flew into a violent rage and shouted at Siberdt: 'You clearly do not know what a young woman is like, God damn it! A woman must have hips, buttocks, a pelvis in which she can carry a baby!' According to some accounts this was the last time van Gogh attended classes at the Academy and he left later for Paris. On 31 March 1886, which was about a month after the confrontation with Siberdt, the teachers of the Academy decided that 17 students, including van Gogh, had to repeat a year. The story that van Gogh was expelled from the Academy by Siberdt is therefore unfounded.

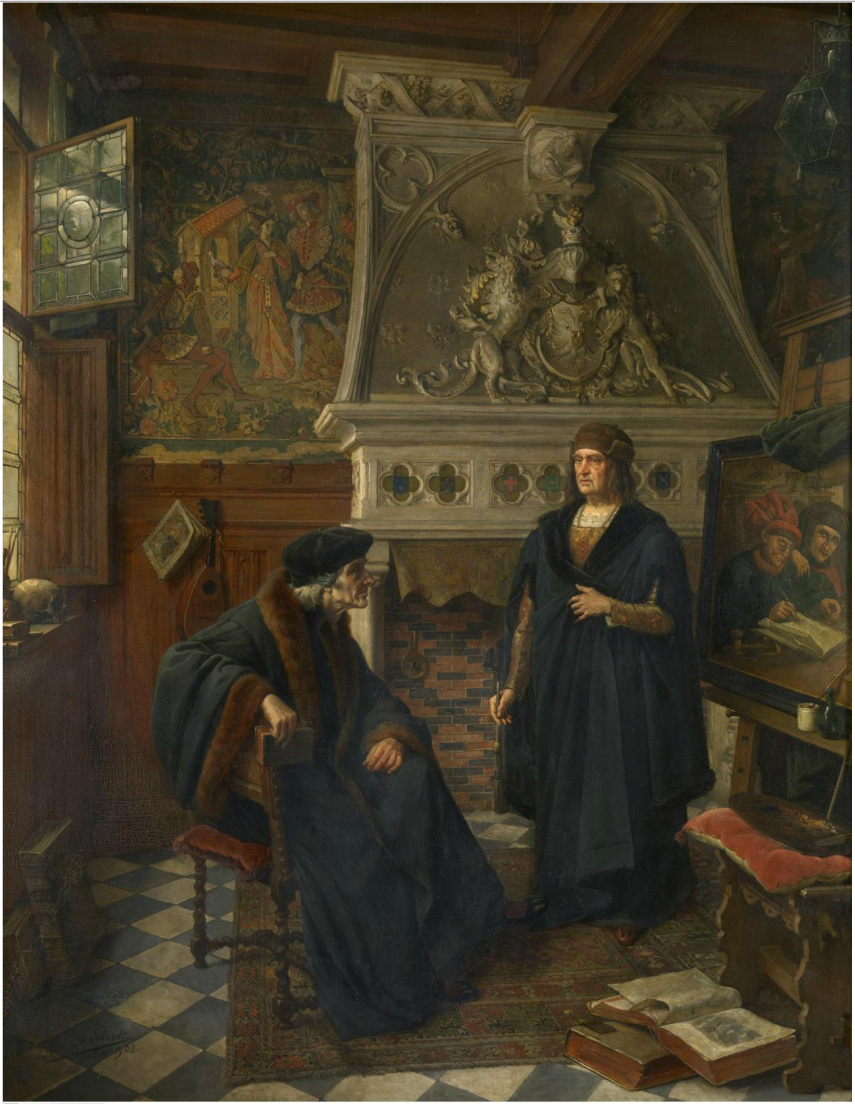
Erasmus and Quentin Matsys

About ten years after the incident with van Gogh, Siberdt was involved in a conflict with Eugeen Van Mieghem, another student who did not wish to submit to the academic rigour of the Antwerp Academy. This also led to Van Mieghen leaving the Academy.

== Work ==
Eugène Siberdt was a typical representative of the late-Romantic style as developed in Belgium by pupils and teachers of the Antwerp Academy. In particular, the influence of Henri Leys remained paramount at the Academy throughout the second half of the 19th century in style as well as subject matter. The teachers at the Academy encouraged their students to study the antique, draw precisely and stick to the sober and somber palette typical of 19th century academic painting. The conflict between Siberdt and van Gogh is best seen as a conflict between van Gogh's unconventional view of art and the academic view represented by Siberdt.

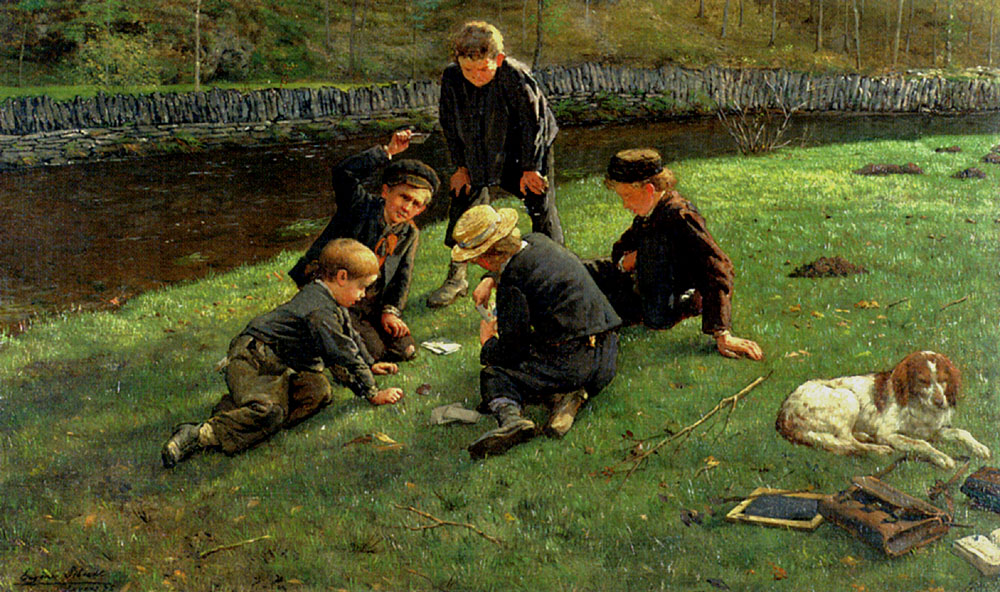
The little gamblers, 1876

As a typical representative of the academic tradition of the Antwerp academy, Siberdt painted subjects such as genre scenes often of a sentimental nature such as The sad omen, stories from the glorious national artistic history such as The meeting between Erasmus and Quentin Matsys or international historic events such as Martin Luther translating the bible. The historic scenes were typically set in the 16th and 17th century, de period during which Antwerp enjoyed its cultural and commercial heyday. Stories from Goethe's Faust were also a recurring theme. Siberdt further created history paintings with biblical subjects such as The Prophet Nathan rebukes King David.

Siberdt painted many Orientalist compositions. These often depict Roma women or harems such as The jewels of a Harem. The latter painting also reflected the contemporary interest in the theme of the harem and the odalisque in Orientalism.

Siberdt was a capable portrait painter who was sought after by private and official patrons.
