= Isidore de Stein d'Altenstein =

Charles Julien Isidore de Stein d'Altenstein (1819–1896) was a civil servant in the Belgian ministry of foreign affairs, with a particular interest in heraldry and genealogy. He was born in Mesnil-Saint-Blaise (Houyet), the second son of Charles Frédéric Guillaume, baron Stein d'Altenstein, and Marie-Catherine de Malmédy de Deignée. His father's family was originally from Germany. He married Justine Lysen (1827–1860), with whom he had three children, Julien, Armand and Clotilde.

In 1845 he published a two-volume Armorial du Royaume de Belgique, and from 1847 to 1888 he produced an Annuaire de la noblesse de Belgique. He died in Namur on 9 December 1896.
