= 1855 in Belgium =

- Decades: 1830s; 1840s; 1850s; 1860s; 1870s
- See also: Other events of 1855; List of years in Belgium

The following events occurred in Belgium in the year 1855.

== Incumbents ==
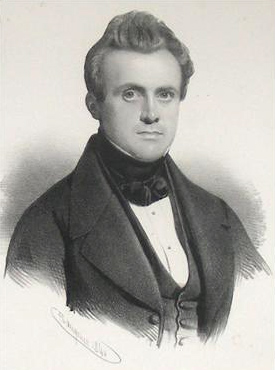
Pierre de Decker, prime minister 1855-1857

- Monarch: Leopold I
- Head of government: Henri de Brouckère (to 30 March); Pierre de Decker (from 30 March)

== Events ==
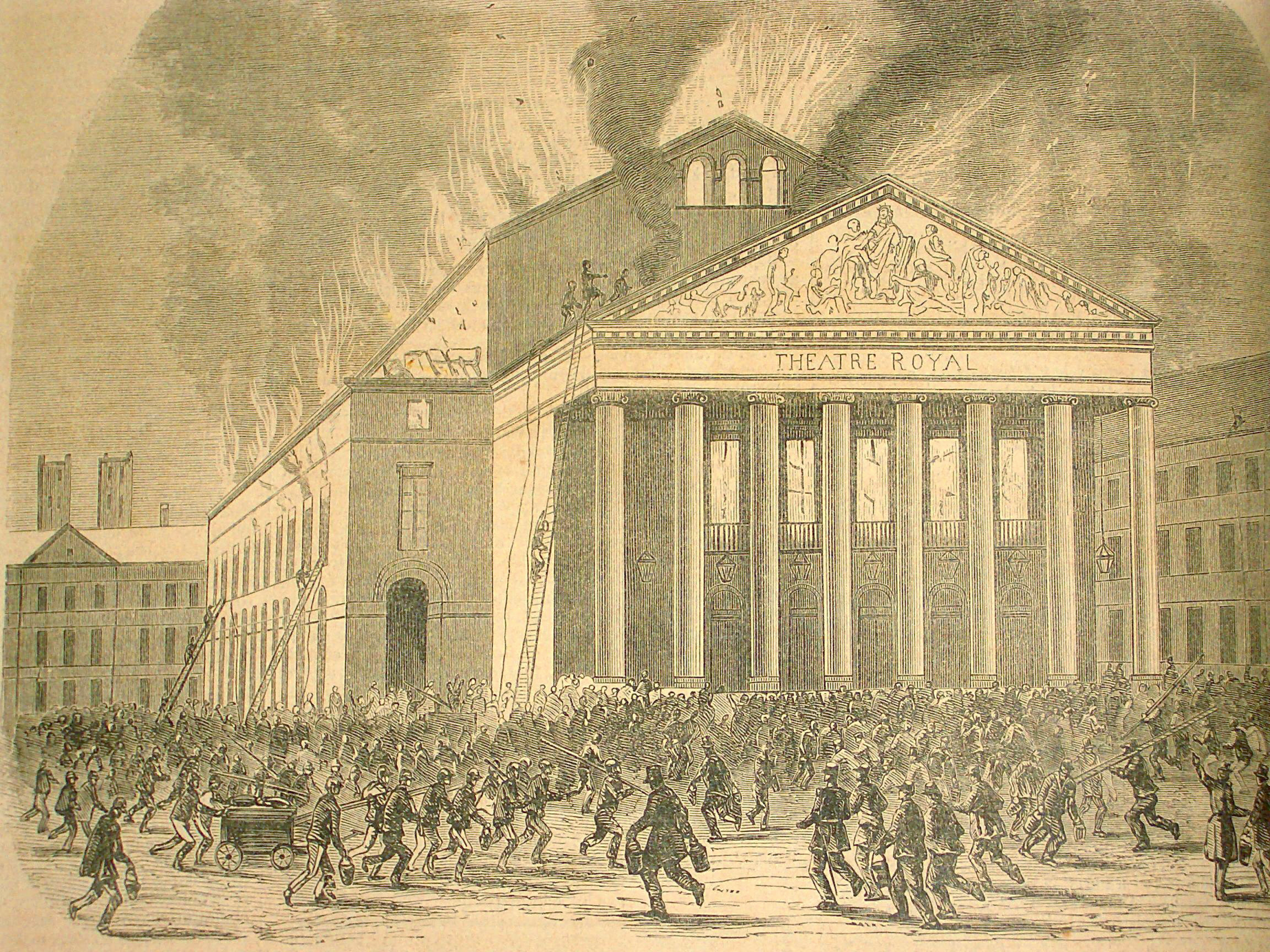
Fire at the Monnaie Theatre

- 21 January – Fire at the Monnaie Theatre.
- 30 March – Pierre de Decker succeeds Henri de Brouckère as Prime Minister.
- 9 April – Royal Belgian Entomological Society founded.
- 12 June – Elections to the Senate
- 29 June – Telegraphic convention between Belgium, France and Prussia signed in Berlin.
- Collège Saint-François-Xavier established in Verviers.

== Publications ==
Periodicals

- Almanach royal officiel (Brussels, H. Tarlier)
- Annales de pomologie belge et étrangère, vol. 3.
- Annuaire statistique et historique belge, vol. 2, edited by Auguste Scheler (Brussels, Kiessling-Schnee & Cie.)
- La Belgique Horticole, vol. 5.
- Bulletin de la Commission Centrale de Statistique (Brussels, M. Hayez)
- Collection de précis historiques, vol. 6, edited by Edouard Terwecoren
- Le Guide musical begins publication with Schott frères
- Messager des sciences historiques (Ghent, L. Hebbelynck)
- Pasicrisie ou recueil général de la jurisprudence des cours de France et de Belgique (Brussels, E. Bruylant., 1855)
- Pasinomie: collection complète des lois, décrets, ordonnances, arrêtés et règlements généraux, edited by M. Ranwet (Brussels, Meline, Cans et Cie.)
- Vaderlandsch museum voor Nederduitsche letterkunde, oudheid en geschiedenis begins publication, edited by Constant-Philippe Serrure.

Books

- Hendrik Conscience, The Lion of Flanders, English translation (London, Lambert & co.)
- Hendrik Conscience, Tales of Old Flanders: Count Hugo of Craenhove and Wooden Clara (London, Lambert & co.)
- Walter Scott, France and Belgium (Edinburgh, Adam & Charles Black)
- Jean-Joseph Thonissen, La Belgique sous le règne de Léopold I, vol. 1 (Liège, J.-G. Lardinois)

== Art and architecture ==
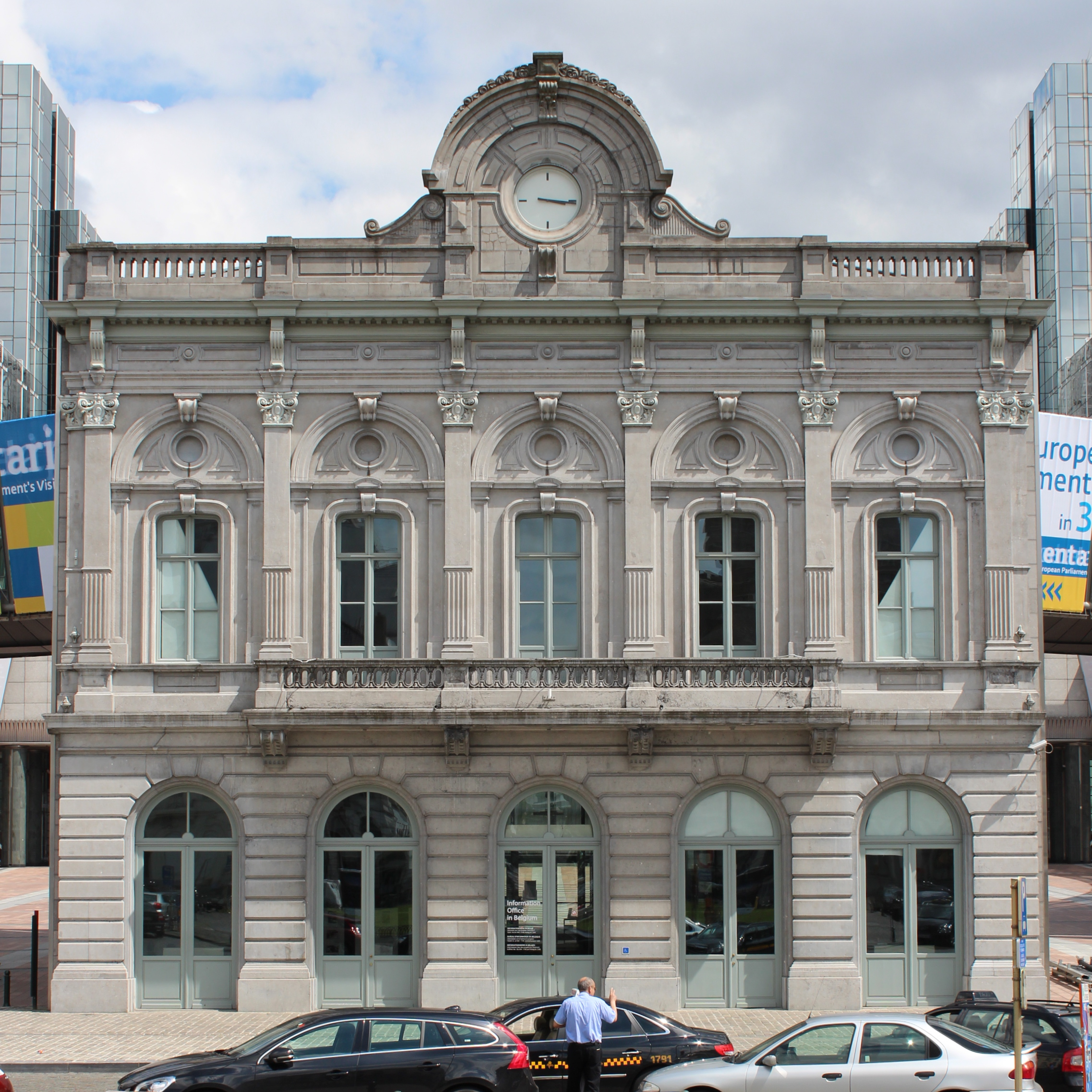
Quartier Leopold railway station, Brussels

Buildings

- Gustave Saintenoy, Quartier Leopold railway station, Brussels

Paintings

- Jean Carolus, Baby's First Steps
- Jean Carolus, The Finishing Touches
- Emile De Cauwer, Church Interior
- Henri Joseph Dillens, The Bird's Nest
- Charles Leickert, Coastal scene with fisherfolk
- Henri Leys, Home-Coming
- Alfred Stevens, The Painter and His Model
- Ildephonse Stocquart, Fleeing the Storm
- François Stroobant, Courtyard of the Palace of Margaret of Austria

== Births ==
- 14 March – Émile Wangermée, colonial officer (died 1924)
- 16 April – Edouard de Jans, painter (died 1919)
- 3 May – Amaat Joos, priest (died 1937)
- 9 May – Emilie Claeys, feminist (died 1943)
- 10 May – Anthony Bowlby, soldier (died 1929)
- 21 May – Émile Verhaeren, poet (died 1916)
- 9 July – Jakob Smits, painter (died 1928)
- 16 July – Georges Rodenbach, author (died 1898)
- 21 August – Auguste Toubeau, trade unionist (died 1912)
- 1 September – Eugène Boch, painter (died 1941)
- 3 September – Emilius Seghers, bishop of Ghent (died 1927)
- 4 September – Théophile Alexis Durand, botanist (died 1912)
- 6 October – Alexandre Delcommune, soldier (died 1922)
- 22 December – Victor Deguise, general (died 1925)

== Deaths ==
- 27 February – Louis Lambillotte (born 1796), Jesuit musicologist
- 24 April – Angelus de Baets (born 1793), painter
- 13 November – James Oliver Van de Velde (born 1795), bishop
- 20 December – Pierre-Ernest Dams (born 1794), politician
