= 1856 in Belgium =

- Decades: 1830s; 1840s; 1850s; 1860s; 1870s
- See also: Other events of 1856; List of years in Belgium

Events in the year 1856 in Belgium.

== Incumbents ==
Monarch: Leopold I
Head of government: Pierre de Decker

== Events ==
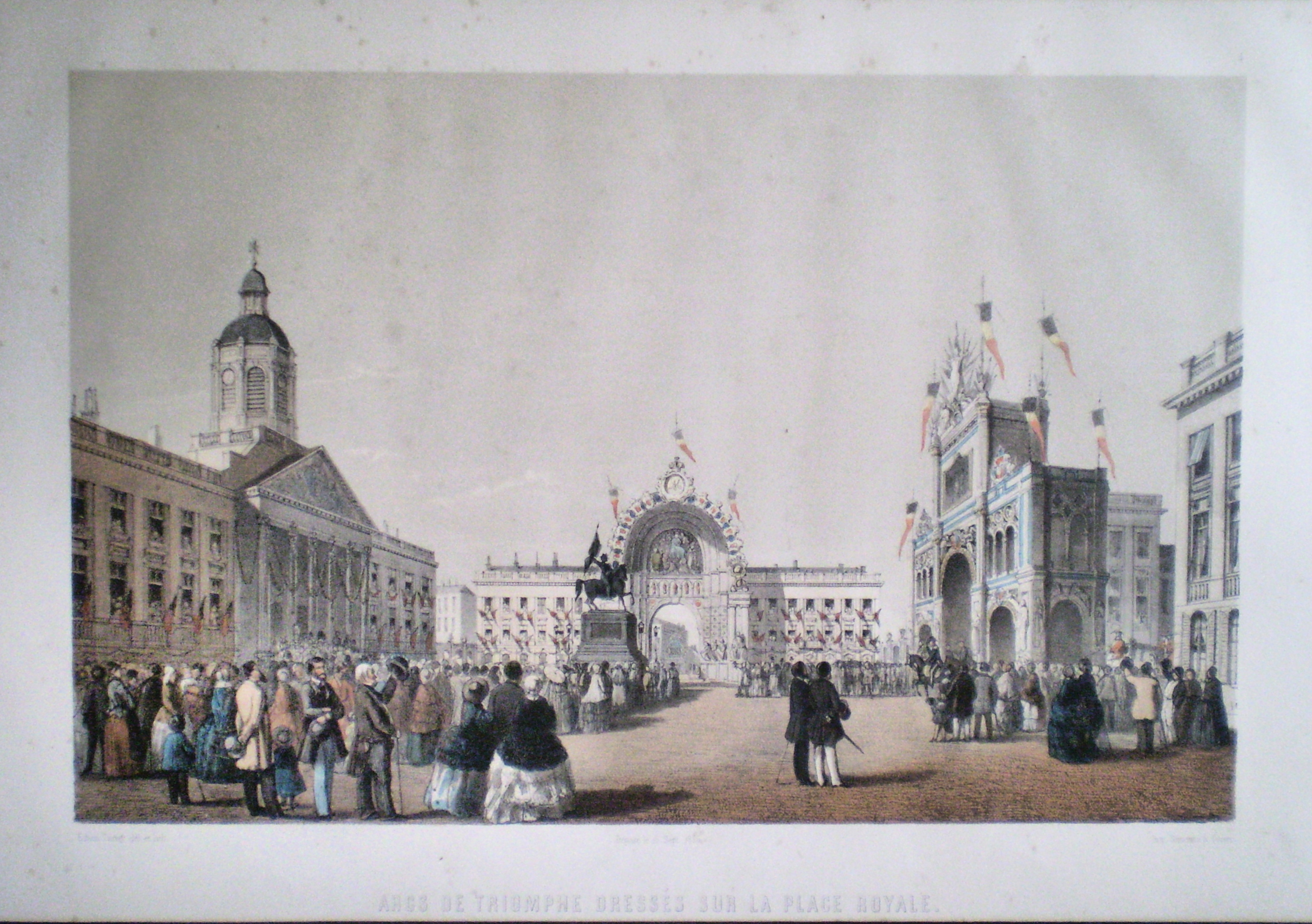
Temporary triumphal arches to mark the jubilee of Leopold I's swearing-in as monarch

- 1 May – Railway line between Brussels and Ghent completed
- 26 May – Provincial elections
- 10 June – Partial legislative elections return a Catholic majority
- 27 June – Royal order institutes a committee to examine Flemish language grievances.
- 21-23 July – Celebration of the jubilee of Leopold I's swearing-in as monarch

== Art and architecture ==
Paintings

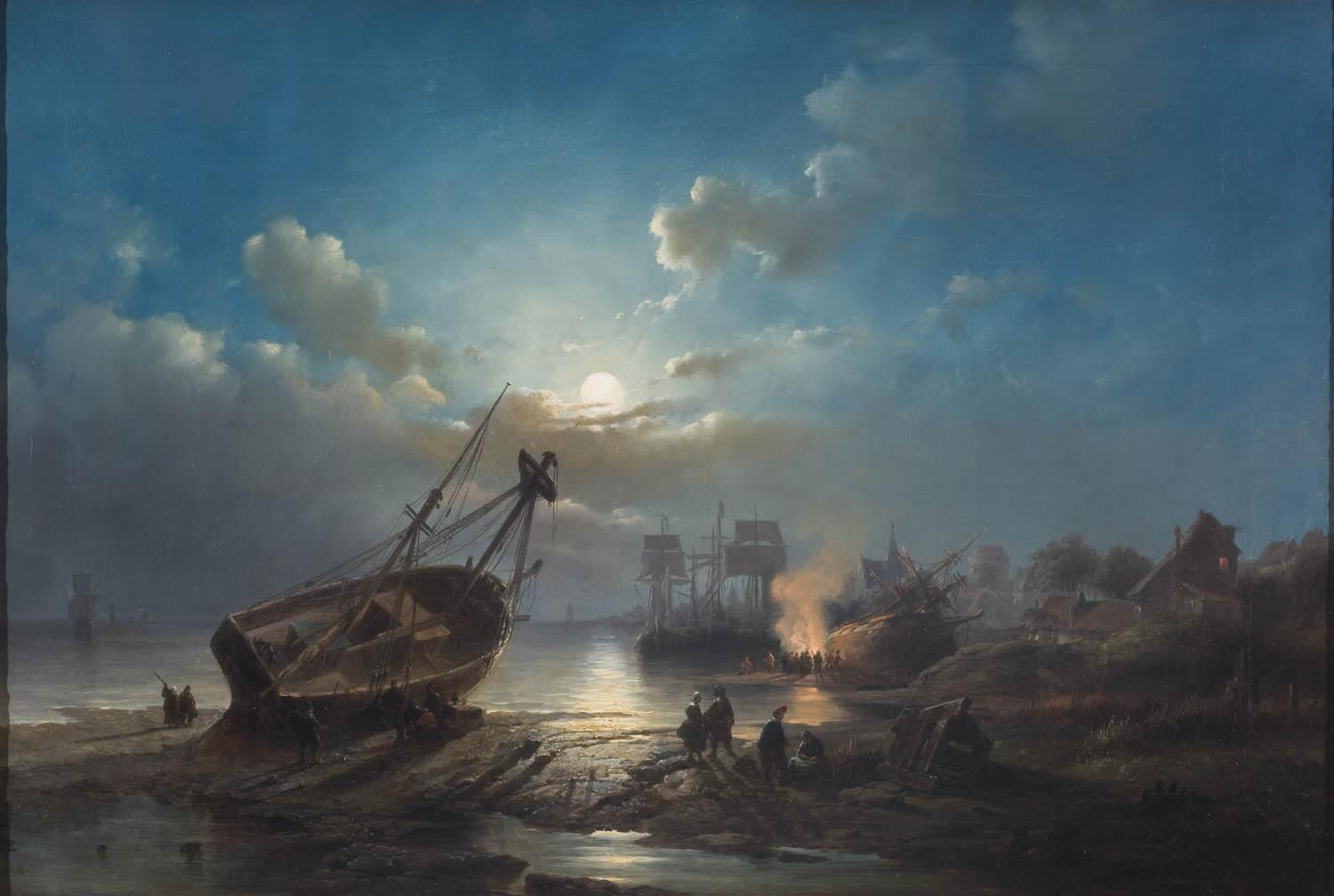
Henri Adolphe Schaep, Working in the Docks at Night (1856)

- Charles de Groux, Pilgrimage of St Guido of Anderlecht
- Basile de Loose, The Happy Family
- Charles Leickert, Urban Landscape
- Henri Adolphe Schaep, Working in the Docks at Night
- Adolphe Stache, Elegant Company
- Charles-Philogène Tschaggeny, The Unwilling Traveller
- Antoine Wiertz, Coquette Dress (The Devil's Mirror)

== Publications ==
Periodicals

- Almanach royal officiel (Brussels, Tarlier)
- Annales de pomologie belge et étrangère, vol. 4.
- Annuaire de la noblesse de Belgique, vol. 10, edited by Isidore de Stein d'Altenstein
- Annuaire statistique et historique belge, vol. 3, edited by Auguste Scheler
- Annuaire de l'Académie royale de Belgique, vol. 22
- La Belgique, 2
- La Belgique Horticole, vol. 6.
- Bulletin de la Société de médecine de Gand, vol. 23 (Ghent, Leonard Hebbelynck)
- Collection de précis historiques, vol. 5, edited by Edouard Terwecoren S.J.
- Journal de l'armée belge
- Journal d'horticulture pratique de la Belgique

Official reports and monographs

- Recueil consulaire contenant les rapports commerciaux
- Recueil des lois et arrêtés royaux de la Belgique, vol. 8
- Joseph Jean De Smet (ed.), Recueil des chroniques de Flandre, vol. 3 (Brussels, Commission royale d'Histoire)
- François Joseph Ferdinand Marchal and Edmond Marchal, Histoire politique du règne de l'empereur Charles-Quint (Brussels, H. Tarlier)
- Jean-Joseph Thonissen, La Belgique sous le règne de Léopold I, vol. 2 (Liège, J.-G. Lardinois)

Guidebooks and directories

- Bradshaw's Illustrated Hand-book for Travellers in Belgium, on the Rhine, and through Portions of Rhenish Prussia (London, W.J. Adams)

== Births ==
- 5 January – Omer Bodson, soldier (died 1891)
- 15 January – Paul de Favereau, politician (died 1922)
- 28 January – Eva Dell'Acqua, composer (died 1930)
- 5 February – Thomas Louis Heylen, bishop (died 1941)
- 6 February – Gerard Portielje, painter (died 1929)
- 17 February – Joseph Boex, author (died 1940)
- 11 April – Constant Lievens, Jesuit (died 1893)
- 9 June – Auguste de Bavay, brewer (died 1944)
- 12 June – Octave Maus, lawyer (died 1919)
- 18 June – Edward Génicot, Jesuit (died 1900)
- 26 July – Edward Anseele, politician (died 1938)
- 1 August – Frans Hens, artist (died 1928)
- 26 August – Léon Frédéric, painter (died 1940)
- 9 October – Sylvain Dupuis, composer (died 1931)
- 27 October – Albrecht Rodenbach, poet (died 1880)
- 28 December – Henri de Merode-Westerloo, politician (died 1908)

== Deaths ==
- 7 March – Alphonse de Woelmont (born 1799), politician
- 23 April – Philippe Joseph Maillart (born 1764), engraver
- 22 November – Albert Prisse (born 1788), diplomat
- 28 December – Auguste Drapiez (born 1778), naturalist
