= 1858 in Belgium =

- Decades: 1830s; 1840s; 1850s; 1860s; 1870s
- See also: Other events of 1858; List of years in Belgium

Events in the year 1858 in Belgium.

== Incumbents ==
Monarch: Leopold I
Head of government: Charles Rogier

== Events ==
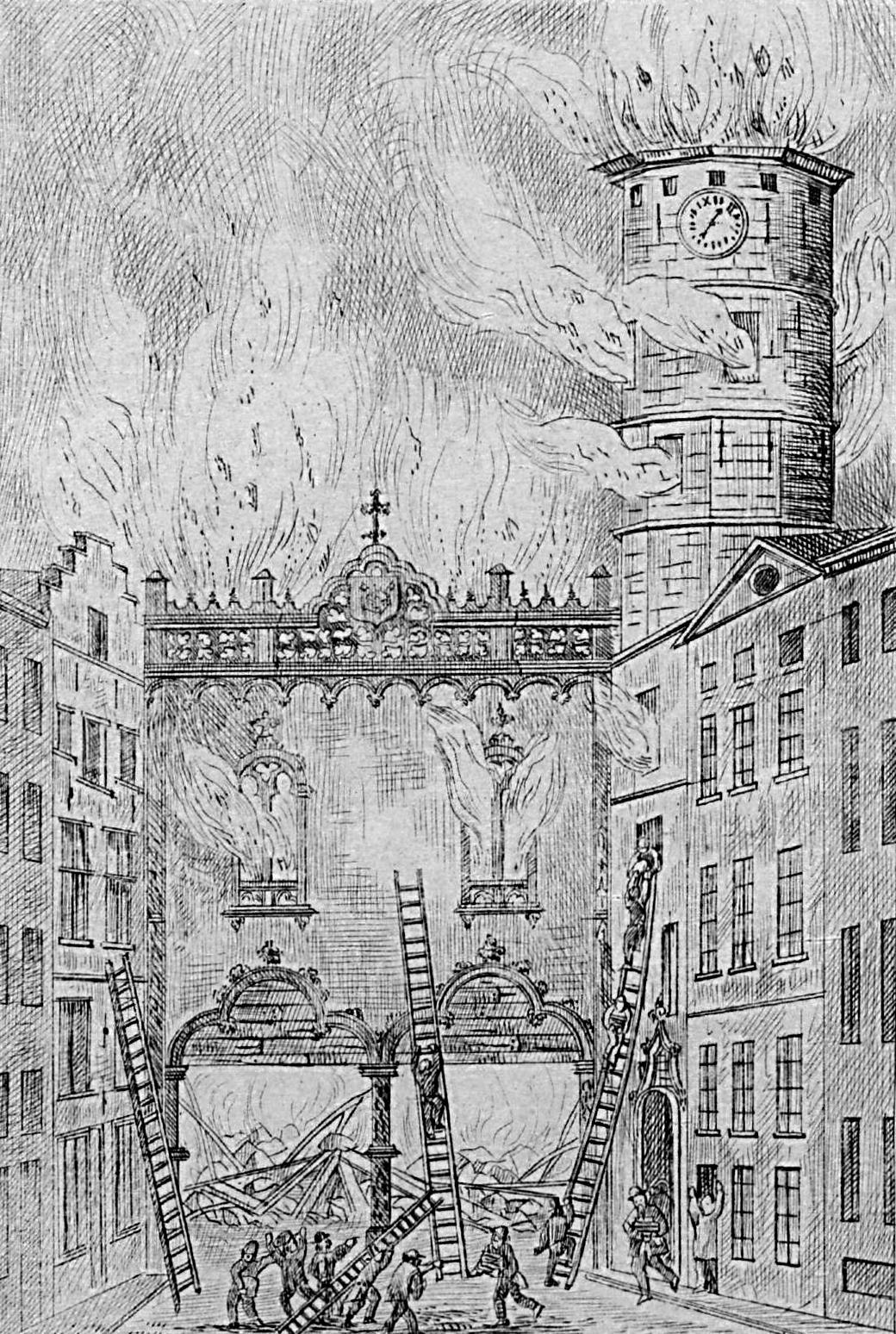
Fire at the Antwerp Exchange, 2 August 1858

- 24 May – Provincial elections
- 17 July – New commercial treaty agreed with the United States.
- 2 August – Stock Exchange in Antwerp burns down.
- September – International congress on intellectual property held in Brussels.

== Art and architecture ==
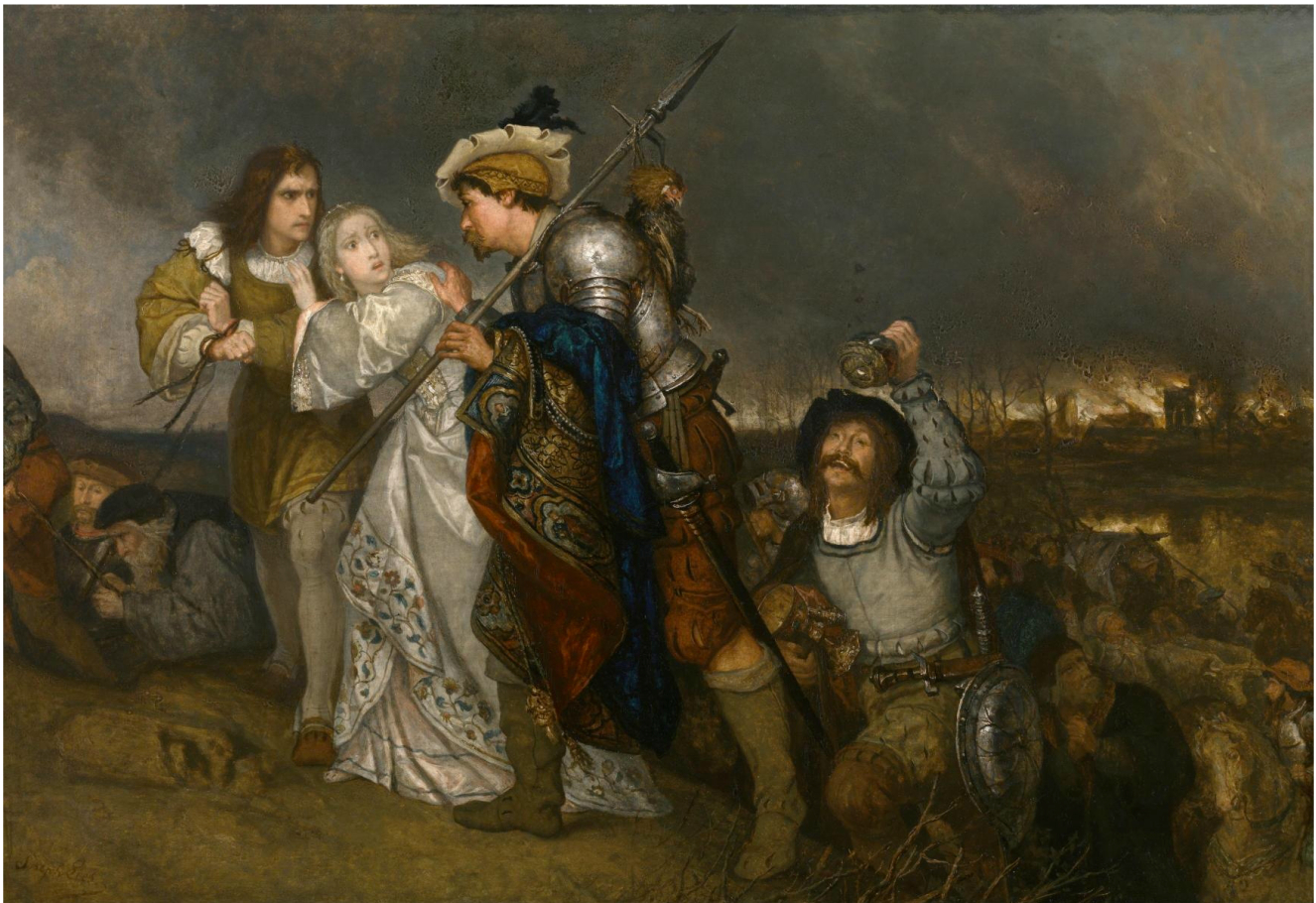
Joseph Lies, The Disasters of War (1858)

=== Painting ===
- Joseph Lies, The Disasters of War

== Publications ==
Periodicals

- Almanach de poche de Bruxelles (Brussels, Tircher)
- Annales de pomologie belge et étrangère, vol. 6.
- Annuaire de la noblesse de Belgique, vol. 12, edited by Isidore de Stein d'Altenstein
- Annuaire statistique et historique belge, vol. 5, edited by Auguste Scheler
- Annuaire de l'Académie royale de Belgique, vol. 24
- La Belgique, 5
- La Belgique Horticole, vol. 8.
- Bulletin et annales de l'Académie d'archéologie de Belgique, vol. 5
- Bulletins de l'Académie royale des sciences et belles-lettres de Bruxelles, vol. 5 (Brussels, Hayez).
- Collection de précis historiques, vol. 7, edited by Edouard Terwecoren S.J.
- Journal de l'armée belge, vol. 15
- Journal d'horticulture pratique de la Belgique

Official reports and monographs

- Recueil consulaire contenant les rapports commerciaux
- Recueil des lois et arrêtés royaux de la Belgique, vol. 10

Other works

- C. H. Barlet, Géographie industrielle et commerciale de la Belgique (Mechelen, E.-F. van Velsen)
- Hendrik Conscience, De omwenteling van 1830 (Antwerp, J. P. van Dieren)
- Alexandre Henne, Histoire du règne de Charles-Quint en Belgique (Brussels and Leipzig, Émile Flatau)
- Jan van Ruusbroec, Dat Boec van den gheesteleken Tabernacule, edited by Jean-Baptist David, 2 volumes (Ghent, Maetschappy der Vlaemsche Bibliophilen).
- Jean-Joseph Thonissen, La Belgique sous le règne de Léopold I, vol. 4 (Liège, J.-G. Lardinois)
- Alphonse Wauters, Bruxelles et ses faubourgs: guide de l'étranger (Brussels, C. W. Froment)

== Births ==
- 8 April – Eugène van Rechem, bishop (died 1943)
- 16 April – Philippe Wolfers, jeweller (died 1929)
- 7 May – Charles Liebrechts, explorer (died 1938)
- 21 June – Léon Roget, colonial officer (died 1909)
- 12 September – Fernand Khnopff, painter (died 1921)
- 19 October – George Albert Boulenger, zoologist (died 1937)
- 4 November – Jacques de Lalaing, artist (died 1917)

== Deaths ==
- 22 February – Noël Delfosse (born 1801), politician
- 14 March – Henri Guillaume Galeotti (born 1814), botanist and geologist
- 22 April – François Joseph Ferdinand Marchal (born 1780), archivist
- 29 April – Charles d'Hane de Steenhuyze (born 1787), politician
- 15 May – Jacques Coghen (born 1791), politician
- 27 June – Coralie van den Cruyce (born 1796), writer
