= 1857 in Belgium =

- Decades: 1830s; 1840s; 1850s; 1860s; 1870s
- See also: Other events of 1857; List of years in Belgium

Events in the year 1857 in Belgium.

== Incumbents ==
Monarch: Leopold I
Head of government: Pierre de Decker (to 9 November); Charles Rogier (from 9 November)

== Events ==
- Jean Neuhaus opens an apothecary shop in Galeries Royales Saint-Hubert
- 28 May – Liberal protests near the Palace of the Nation against a proposed "convents" law that would give the Catholic Church more power to manage charitable foundations.
- 27 October – Municipal elections, giving a liberal victory.
- 30 October – Pierre de Decker's ministry resigns.
- 10 December – Snap legislative elections, giving a liberal victory.

== Publications ==
Periodicals

- Almanach de poche de Bruxelles (Brussels, M. E. Rampelbergh)
- Almanach du commerce et de l'industrie (Brussels, H. Tarlier)
- Annales de pomologie belge et étrangère, vol. 5.
- Annuaire de la noblesse de Belgique, vol. 11, edited by Isidore de Stein d'Altenstein
- Annuaire statistique et historique belge, vol. 4, edited by Auguste Scheler
- Annuaire de l'Académie royale de Belgique, vol. 23
- La Belgique, 4
- La Belgique Horticole, vol. 7.
- Bulletin de l'Académie royale de médecine de Belgique, ser. 2, vol. 1.
- Bulletins de l'Académie royale des sciences et belles-lettres de Bruxelles, vol. 3 (Brussels, Hayez).
- Collection de précis historiques, vol. 6, edited by Edouard Terwecoren S.J.
- Journal de l'armée belge, vols. 13-14
- Journal d'horticulture pratique de la Belgique
- De toekomst: tijdschrift voor opvoeding en onderwijs begins publication

Official reports and monographs

- Recueil consulaire contenant les rapports commerciaux
- Recueil des lois et arrêtés royaux de la Belgique, vol. 9
- Joseph Jean De Smet, Vie de Saint-Liévin, patron de Gand et apôtre du pays d'Alost (Ghent)
- Jean-Joseph Thonissen, La Belgique sous le règne de Léopold I, vol. 3 (Liège, J.-G. Lardinois)

Guidebooks and directories

- David Bogue, Belgium and the Rhine (London, Lee and Carter).

Literature

- Frans de Cort, Liederen, eerste reeks (Antwerp)

== Births ==
- 12 January – Léon de Witte de Haelen, general (died 1933)
- 21 February – Jules de Trooz, politician (died 1907)
- 18 March – César Thomson, violinist (died 1931)
- 26 March – Edmond Deman, publisher (died 1918)
- 8 April – Marie Louise De Meester, religious foundress (died 1928)
- 27 April – Louis-Napoléon Chaltin, colonial officer (died 1933)
- 11 August – Cyriaque Gillain, general (died 1931)
- 25 August – Louis-Gustave Amelot, engineer (died 1884)
- 28 August – Auguste Goffinet, courtier (died 1927)

== Deaths ==
- 4 January – François-Jean Wyns de Raucour (born 1779), politician
- 7 February – Félix de Mérode (born 1791), politician
- 28 February – André Dumont (born 1809), geologist
- 3 May – Jean Baptiste Smits (born 1792), politician
