= 1854 in Belgium =

- Decades: 1830s; 1840s; 1850s; 1860s; 1870s
- See also: Other events of 1854; List of years in Belgium

Events in the year 1854 in Belgium.

== Incumbents ==
- Monarch: Leopold I
- Head of government: Henri de Brouckère

== Events ==
- 27 February – Commercial treaty with France on tariffs, transit and navigation for five years.
- 22 May – Provincial elections
- 13 June – Partial legislative elections of 1854

== Publications ==
Periodicals

- Almanach royal officiel (Brussels, H. Tarlier)
- Annales de l'Académie d'archéologie de Belgique, vol. 11 (Antwerp, Froment)
- Annales de pomologie belge et étrangère, vol. 2.
- Isidore de Stein d'Altenstein (ed.), Annuaire de la noblesse de Belgique, vol. 8 (Brussels, Auguste Decq and C. Muquardt)
- Bulletins de l'Académie Royale des Sciences, des Lettres et des Beaux-Arts de Belgique, 21 (Brussels, Hayez)
- Collection de précis historiques, vol. 5, edited by Edouard Terwecoren
- Messager des sciences historiques (Ghent, L. Hebbelynck)

Books

- Hendrik Conscience, Tales of Flemish life (Constable's Miscellany of Foreign Literature 3; Edinburgh, Thomas Constable)
- Charles Meerts, Dictionnaire Géographique et Statistique du Royaume de Belgique (Brussels, H. Goemaere)
- Jules de Saint-Genois, Historische verhalen
- Belgique industrielle: vues des établissements industriels de la Belgique (Brussels, Jules Géruzet)
- Exposition générale des Beaux-Arts, 1854: Catalogue explicatif (Brussels, G. Stapleaux)

== Art and architecture ==
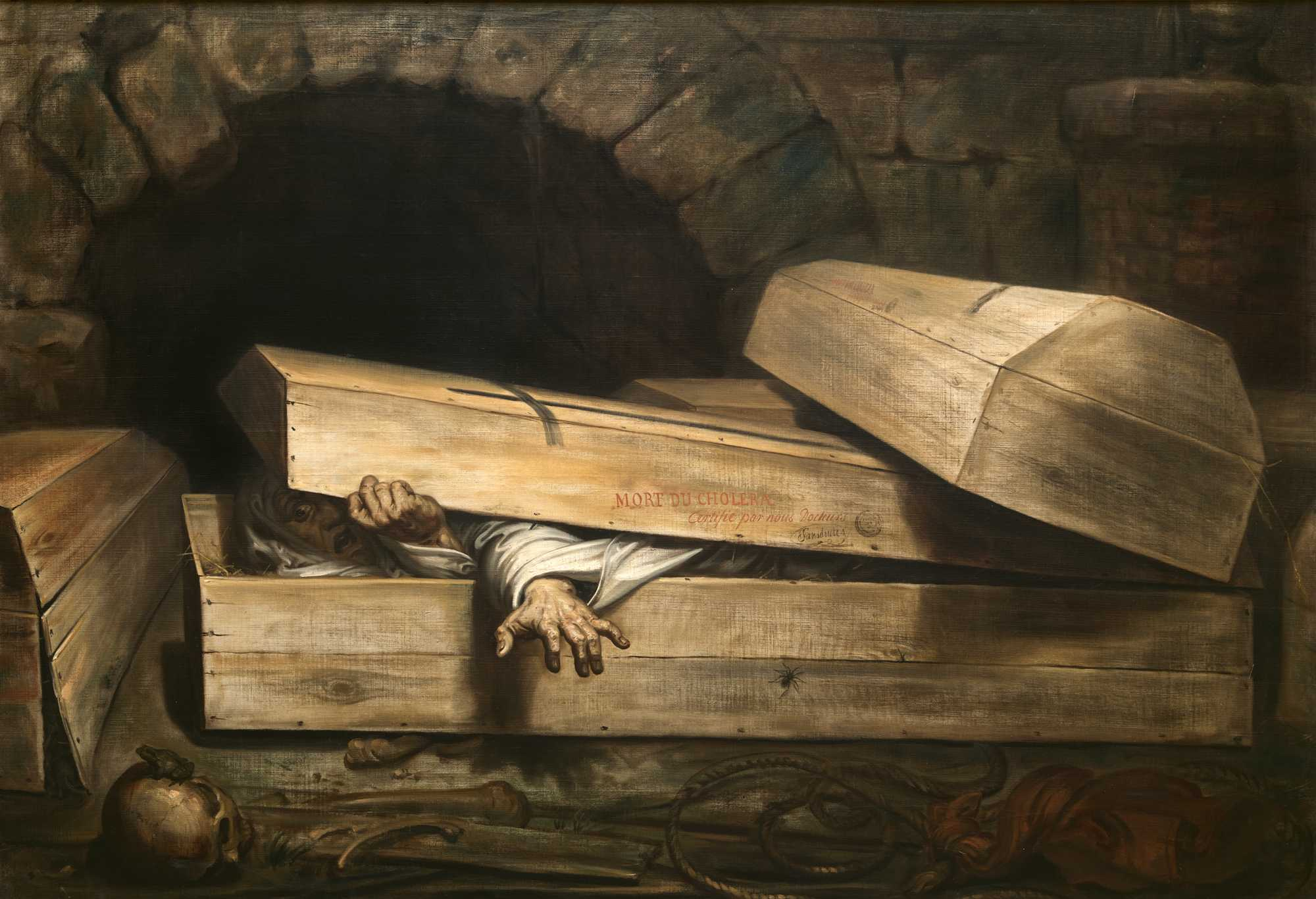
Antoine Wiertz, The Premature Burial (1854)

Paintings

- Antoine Wiertz, The Premature Burial

== Births ==
- 22 April – Henri La Fontaine, Nobel Prize laureate (died 1943)
- 15 May – Émile Van Arenbergh, magistrate and writer (died 1934)
- 25 May – Joseph Van den Gheyn, Jesuit (died 1913)
- 2 July – Achille Gerste, Jesuit linguist (died 1920)
- 18 July – Émile Dossin de Saint-Georges, general (died 1936)
- 22 October – Édouard de Laveleye, engineer (died 1938)
- 31 October – Rémy Cogghe, painter (died 1935)

== Deaths ==
- 28 February – Zoé de Gamond (born 1806), feminist
- 17 September – Joseph De Cauwer (born 1779), painter
- 16 October – Goswin de Stassart (born 1780), politician
