= Joseph De Cauwer =

Joseph De Cauwer or sometimes Cauwer-Ronsse (1779–1854) was a Belgian portraitist and history painter.

== Life ==
De Cauwer was born in Beveren (East Flanders) on 2 February 1779 and began his training at the Royal Academy of Fine Arts in Antwerp, but around 1800 moved to Ghent, where he completed his training at the Royal Academy of Fine Arts there. In 1807 he became professor of drawing at the Ghent Academy, and shortly thereafter also of engraving. He also taught at the state secondary schools in Ghent, as well as taking private pupils. His pupils included Jean Joseph Geens and Willem de Visser (1801-1875).

From 1802 onwards he regularly exhibited at the salon of the Ghent Society of Fine Arts, making his name in 1810 with a Martyrdom of St Lawrence, and receiving gold medals in 1812 and 1817. In 1817 he exhibited L'Humanité Belge, depicting Belgian peasants tending to the wounded of both sides after the Battle of Waterloo. This was bought by the state for the Brussels Museum. Reporting on the Salon of 1819, Le véridique de Gand expressed surprise and regret that no work by De Cauwer was exhibited.

Joseph De Cauwer was father of Emile Pierre Joseph De Cauwer. He retired from his teaching positions in 1846 and died in Ghent on 17 September 1854.

== Works ==
- Baptism of Christ (1808), for Ghent Cathedral
- Peter Paul Rubens Accepting a Sword from Charles I of England (1808), now in the collection of the Museum of Fine Arts, Ghent
- Martyrdom of St Lawrence (1810)
- Miracle of St Nicholas of Tolentino (1811)
- Portrait of the Comte de Lens, Mayor of Ghent (1815)
- L'Humanité Belge (1817), now in the collection of the Royal Museums of Fine Arts of Belgium
- Antigone (1820), bought by the State
- Deliverance of Souls from Purgatory (1824)
- Christ Healing the Blind (1824), for Saint Michael's Church, Ghent
- Prometheus Delivered by Hercules (1832), now in the collection of the Museum of Fine Arts, Ghent
- Descent from the Cross (1835)
