= Achille Gerste =

Aquiles Gerste (July 2, 1854 - November 27, 1920) was a Catholic priest, Jesuit, philologist, and linguist who is known for his ethnographic and linguistic studies of the indigenous peoples of Mexico.

Gerst entered the Society of Jesus on October 3, 1873 and was ordained a priest ten years later. In 1885, he went to Mexico as a missionary and became prefect of a college at Puebla. He became fluent in French, Latin, Spanish, German and Nahuatl. He became interested in the culture of the Rarámuri people, with whom he lived as a missionary.

When he returned to Europe, he collaborated with Carlos Sommervogel on the Bibliographie d'auteurs de la Compagnie de Jésus, While in Rome, he was elected a corresponding member of the Academia Mexicana de la Lengua. He died in Rome.

== Works ==
- Archeologie et Bibliographie Mexicaines Brussels: Polleunis, Ceuterick et Lefébure, 1888
- Notes sur la médecine et la botanique des anciens Mexicains Rome, Impr. Polyglotte vaticane, 1909
- Rapport sur un voyage d'exploration dans la Tarahumara 1914-1915 Tipografia Pontificia Nell'istituto Pio IX, 1914

== Bibliography ==
- Alberto María Carreño (2004). "Aquiles Gerste, S.J.". In José Luis Martínez (ed.). Semblanzas de académicos (in Spanish). México: Fondo de Cultura Económica. pp. 220–221. ISBN 978-968-16-7113-6.
- Miguel León-Portilla (2004). "Aquiles Gerste". In José Luis Martínez (ed.). Semblanzas de académicos (in Spanish). México: Fondo de Cultura Económica. p. 222. ISBN 978-968-16-7113-6.
