= Le véridique de Gand =

Newspaper

- Publisher: Pierre François De Goesin-Verhaeghe
- Founded: 1818
- Language: French
- Ceased publication: 1820
- City: Ghent
- Country: United Kingdom of the Netherlands (Belgium)

Le véridique de Gand was a French-language daily newspaper published in Ghent (United Kingdom of the Netherlands) from 25 November 1818 to 30 September 1820. It was printed and distributed by Pierre François De Goesin-Verhaeghe (1753–1831), printer to the newly established Ghent University, who had previously published Annonces et avis divers du département de l'Escaut.
