= Edward Génicot =

Belgian Jesuit priest and moral theologian

Edward Génicot, born at Antwerp (Belgium), 18 June 1856, and died at Leuven (Belgium), 21 February 1900, was a Belgian Jesuit priest and moral theologian.

== Life ==
After a course of studies at the Jesuit college in Antwerp, he entered the Society of Jesus on 27 September 1872. He was successively professor of humanities and of rhetoric at the Jesuit school of Ghent and at Antwerp. After being ordained priest and sustaining a public defense in all theology, taught first canon law and then moral theology at the Catholic University of Leuven, from 1889 until his death.

== Works ==
In 1896 he published his Theologiæ Moralis Institutiones in which the sixth edition, in harmony with recent decrees of the Holy See, appeared in 1909 (at Brussels). Génicot drew his inspiration chiefly from the large work of Ballerini-Palmieri. His own work follows principles to their conclusions and sets down the conduct confessors may legitimately follow in the confessional.

Another work, Casus Conscientiæ, was published after the author's death. The third edition (1906) appeared with additions and corrections in 1909 (Louvain). These 'cases of conscience' were gathered in large part from actual experience.

In his writings, Génicot discussed topics including abortion and just war theory.
