= Jean Carolus =

Belgian painter

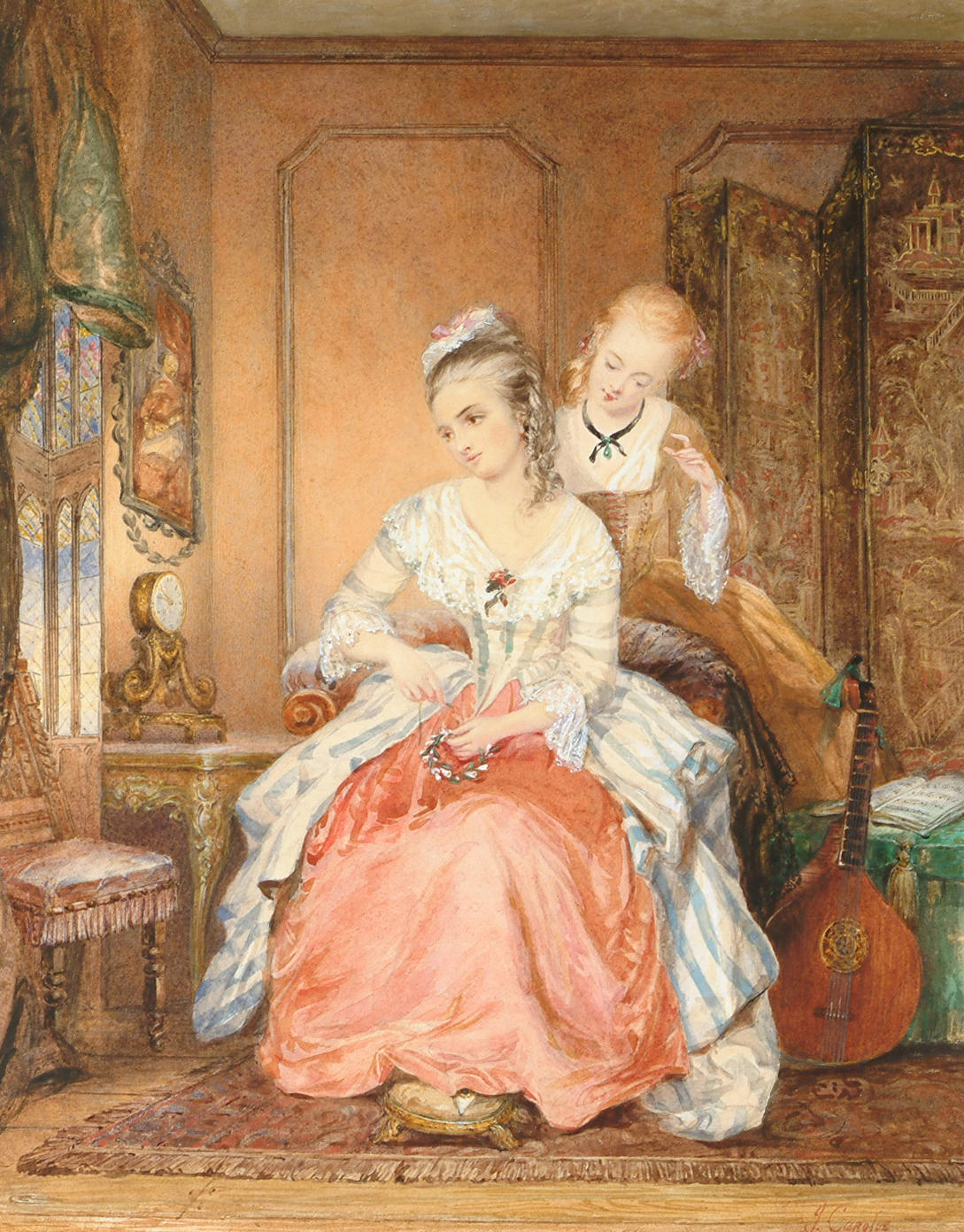
- A lady and her maid watercolour, 42 x 32.5 cm
- Born: 1814; Brussels
- Died: 1897 (aged 82–83); Paris, France
- Known for: Painting
- Movement: Realism, Romanticism, Genre

Jean Carolus (1814 – 1897) was a Belgian painter of genre scenes and interiors, who spent much of his life living and working in France. Noted for his depictions of figures set within interior scenes, he is esteemed for the high degree of finish and jewel-like quality attained in these works.

== Life and work ==
Jean Carolus, born in Brussels and raised in Belgium, was a protege of François-Joseph Navez, Director of the Académie Royale des Beaux-Arts in Brussels. Carolus, however, spent most of his life in France, where between 1855 and 1880 he painted prolifically; portraying elegantly attired aristocrats often engaged in pursuits of a leisurely nature. The artist chose the subject matter of his paintings with great care, focusing primarily of representations of people in the 18th century; French interiors and garden scenes. His style characteristically combines a luminous color palette with the expressive grace and elegance of his meticulously rendered figures. He died in Paris.

One of his most celebrated works entitled La partie de billard sous Louis XV (A Game of Billiards under Louis XV), 1855, oil on canvas, 75 x 96 cm, is part of the collection of the Yper Museum.

== Gallery ==
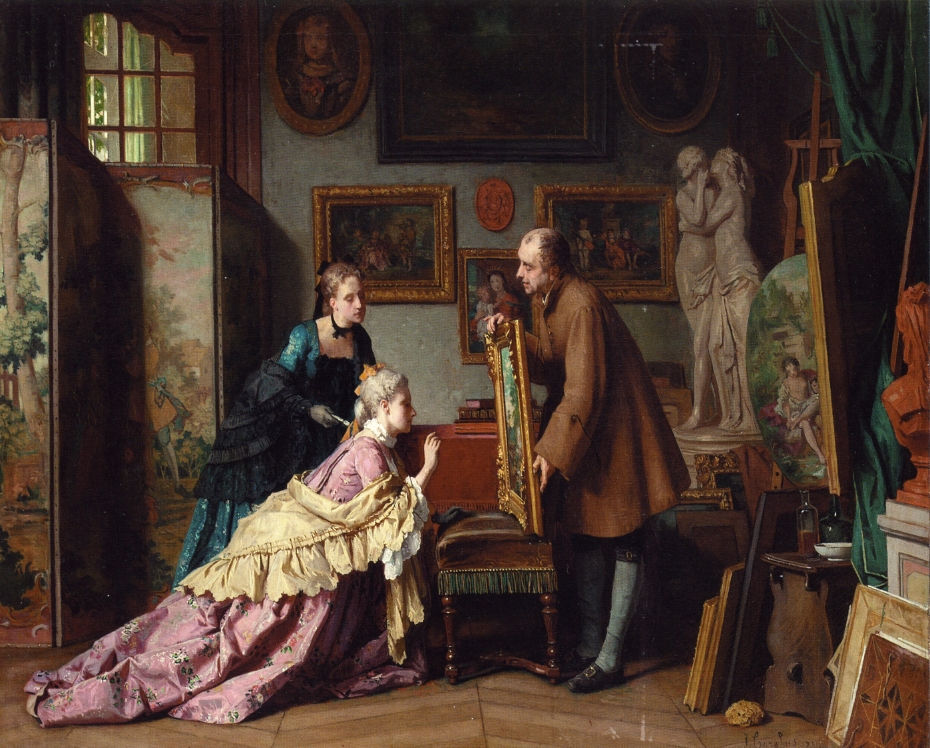
Jean Carolus, 1889, A Visit to the Studio, oil on canvas, 78 x 95 cm, private collection

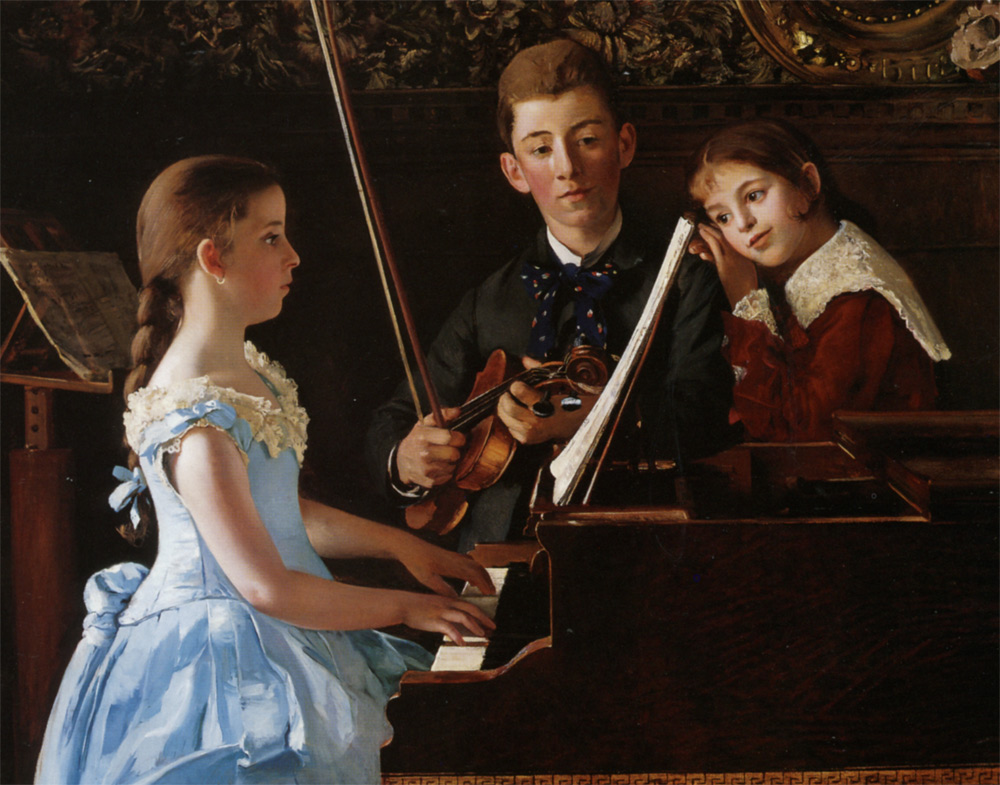
Jean Carolus, The Recital, oil on canvas, 82 x 105.4 cm

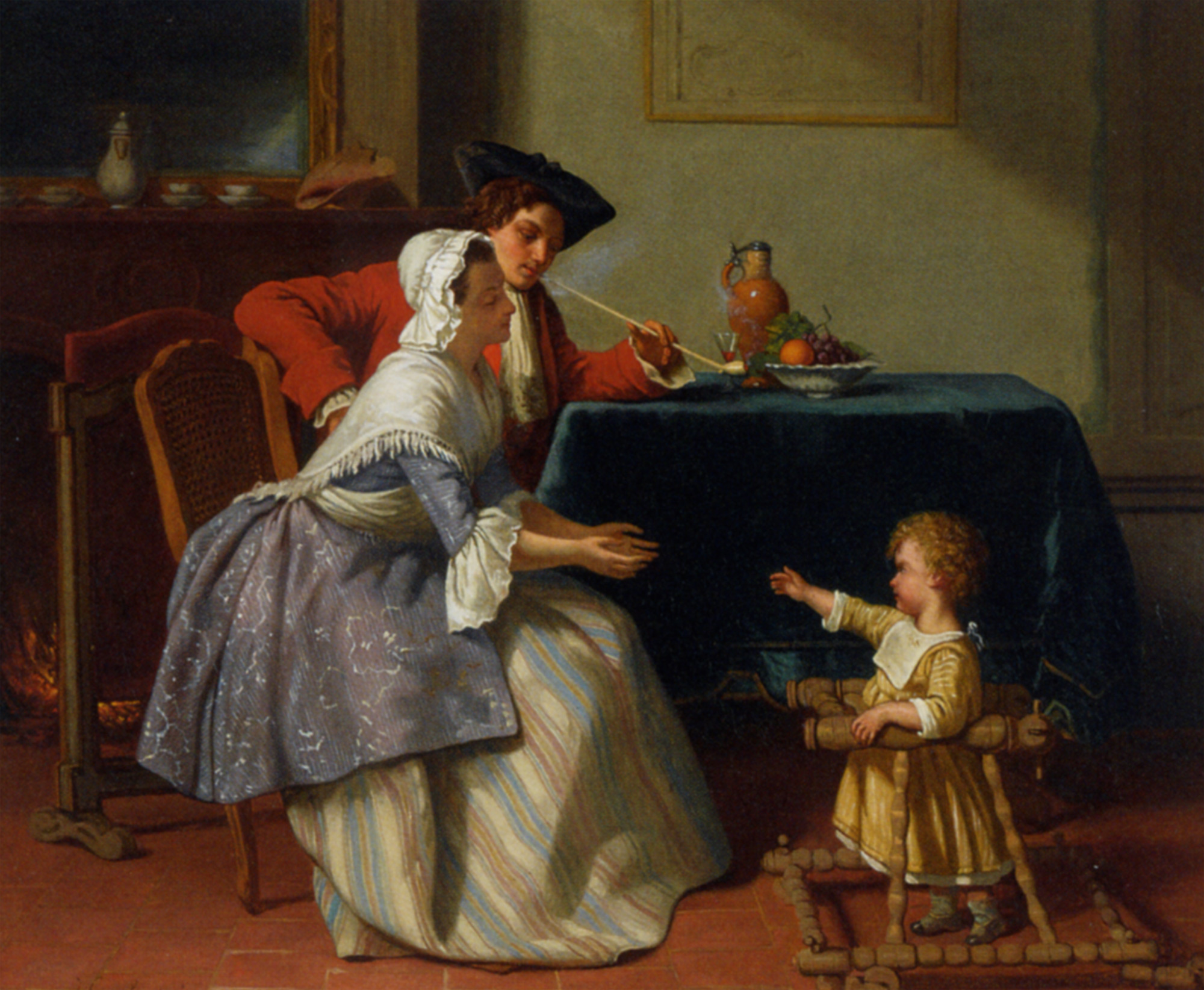
Jean Carolus, 1855, Baby's First Steps, oil on panel, 41 x 48.5 cm, private collection

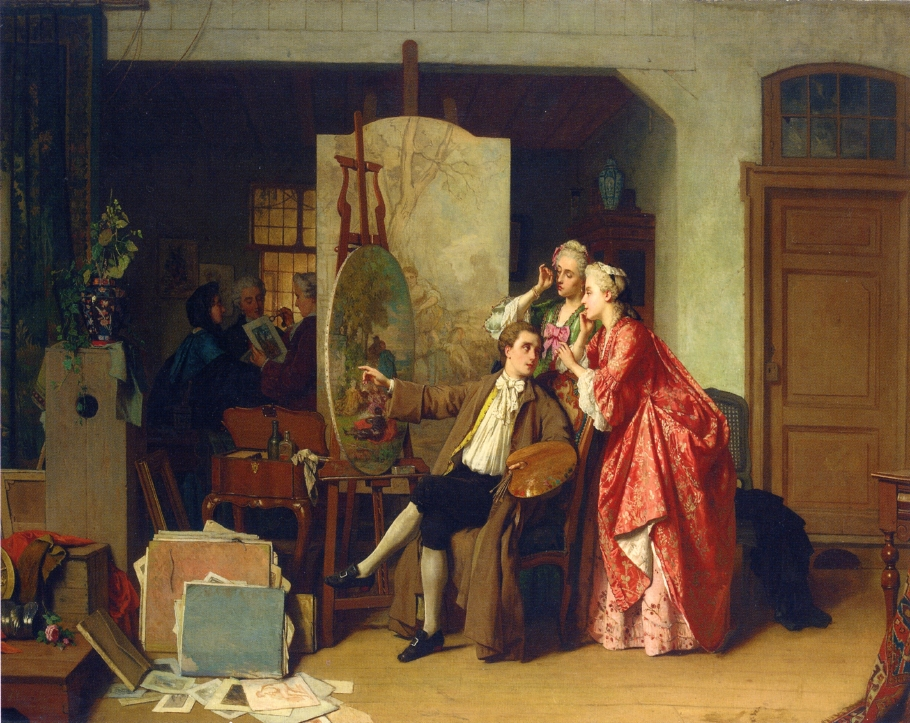
Jean Carolus, 1866, A Visit to Watteau's Studio, oil on canvas, 82.8 x 106 cm, private collection

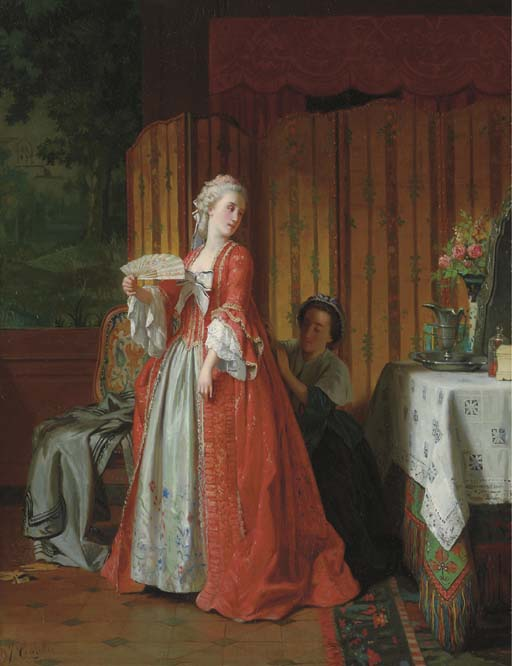
Jean Carolus, The Finishing Touches, oil on canvas, 66 x 54 cm

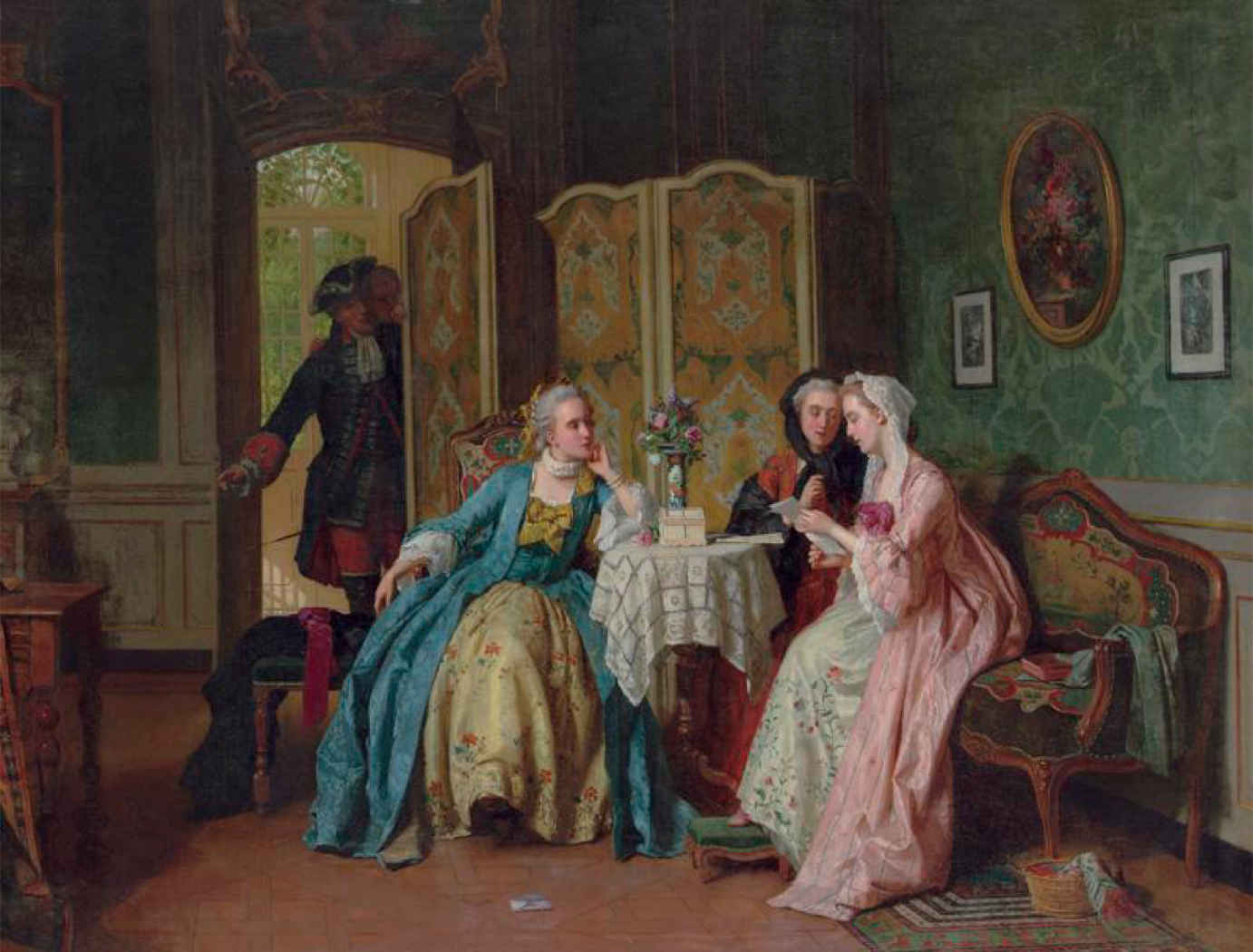
Jean Carolus, 1866, The Letter, oil on canvas, 81.2 x 105.4 cm, public collection

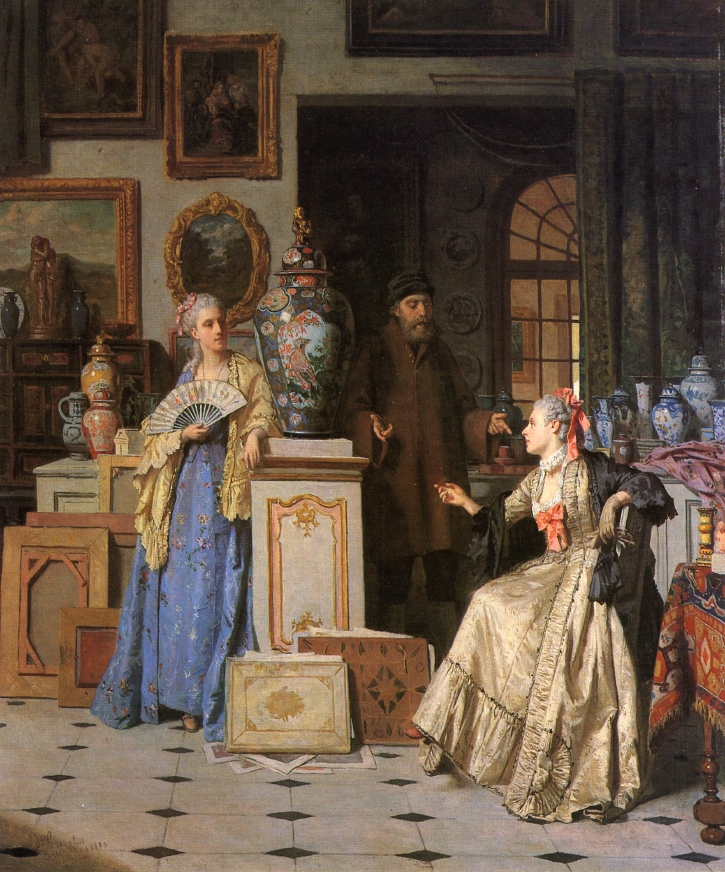
Jean Carolus, 1880, At the Antiquarian's, oil on canvas, 96 x 78 cm, private collection

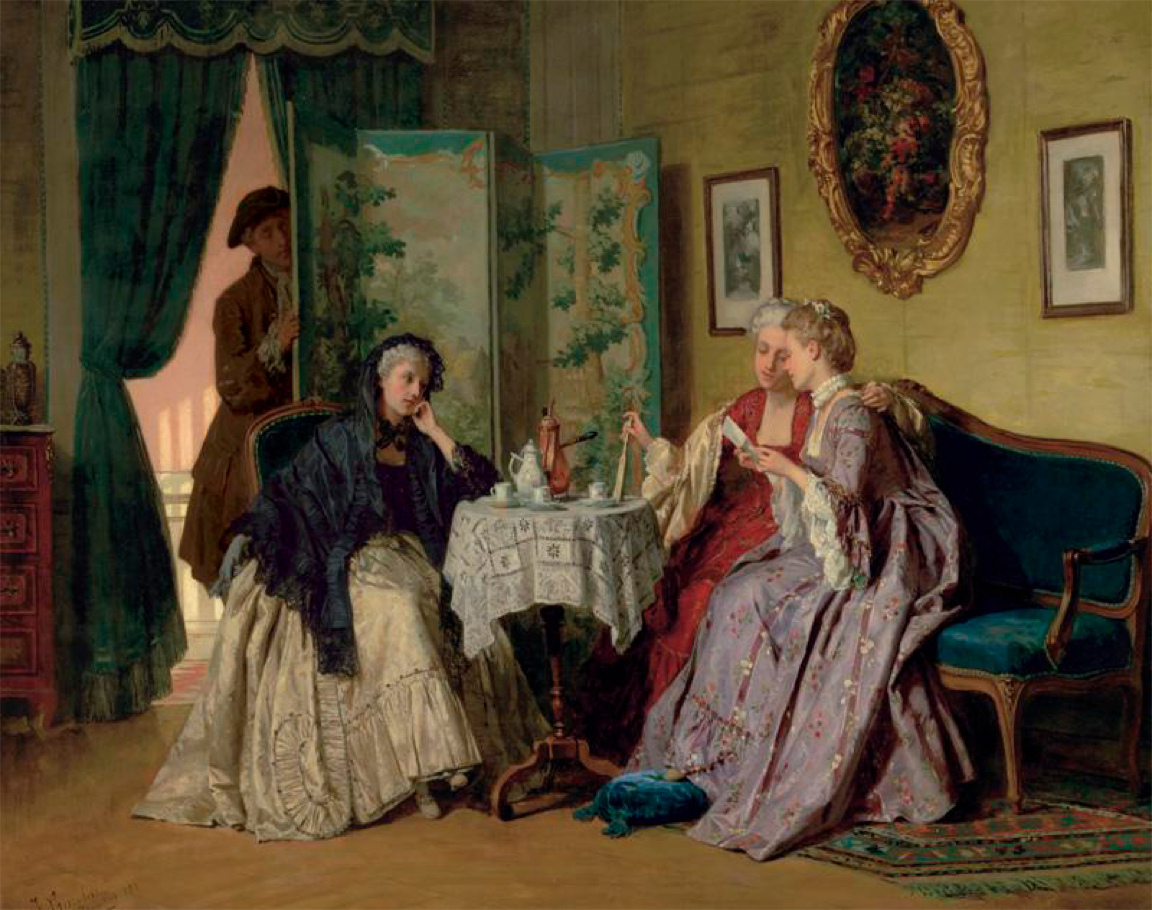
Jean Carolus, 1880, The Eavesdropper, oil on canvas, 77.5 x 95.8 cm, public collection

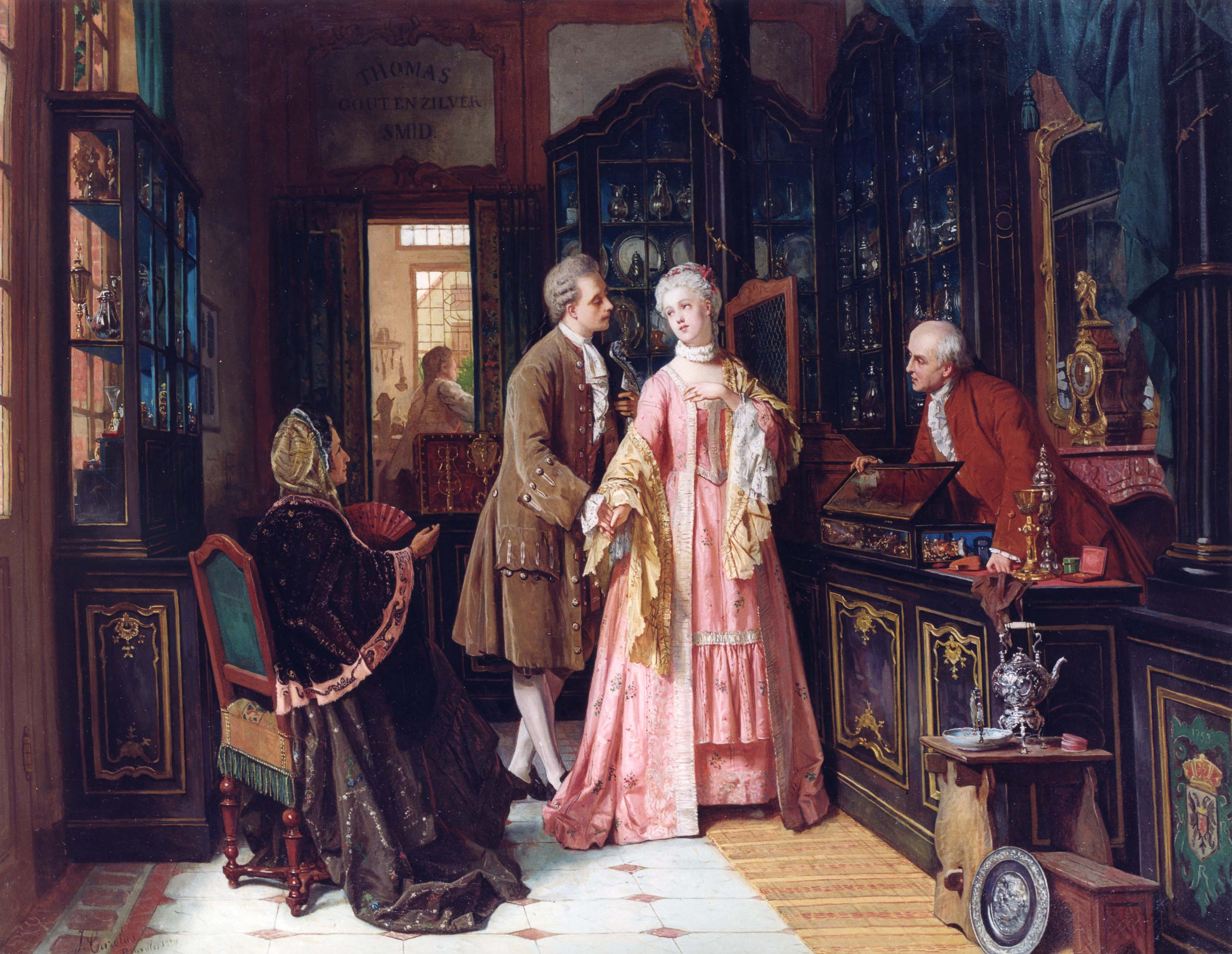
Jean Carolus, Choosing the Ring, oil on canvas, 83 x 106.5 cm

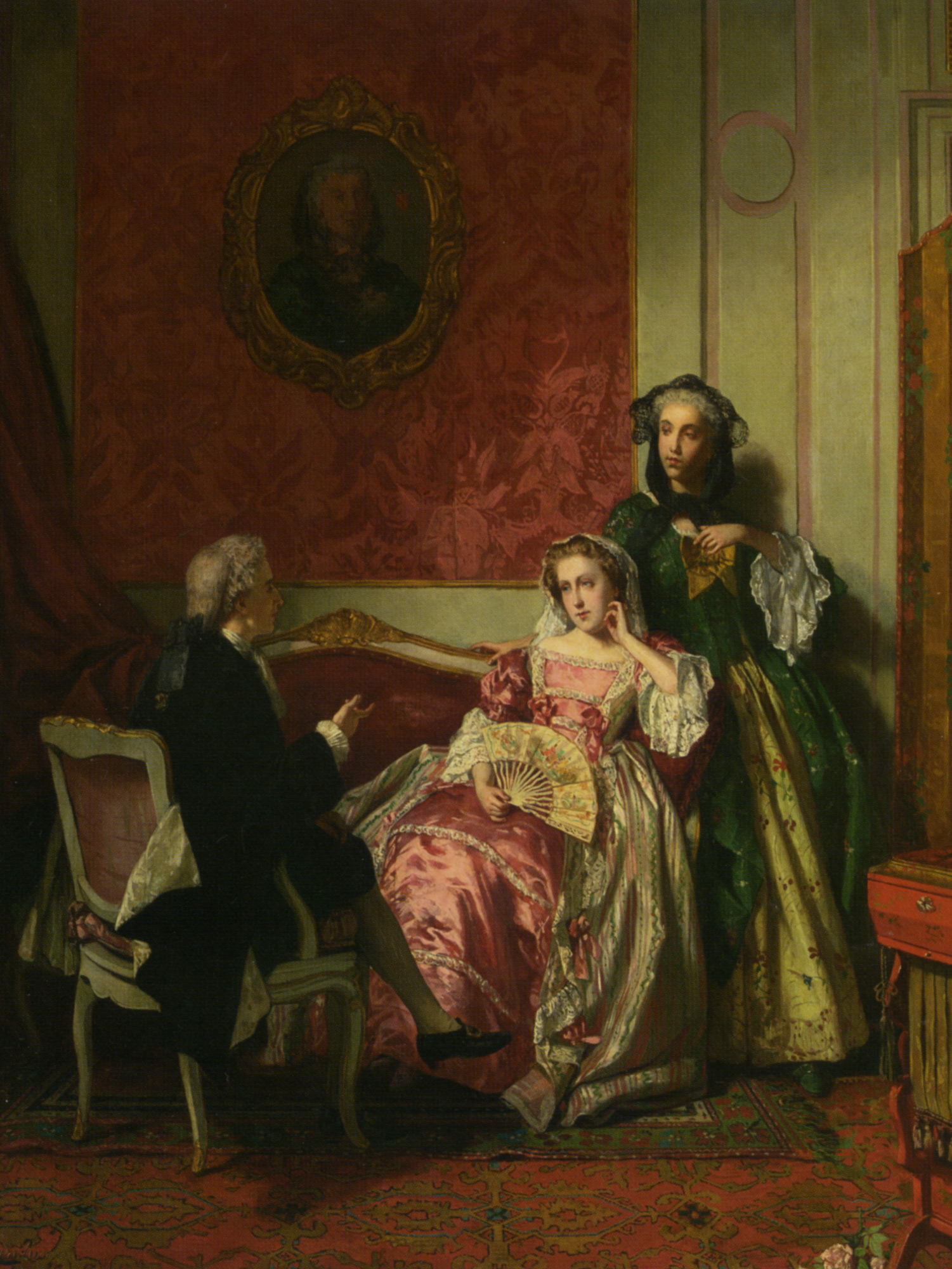
Jean Carolus, The Explanation, oil on panel, 73 x 55.9 cm, private collection

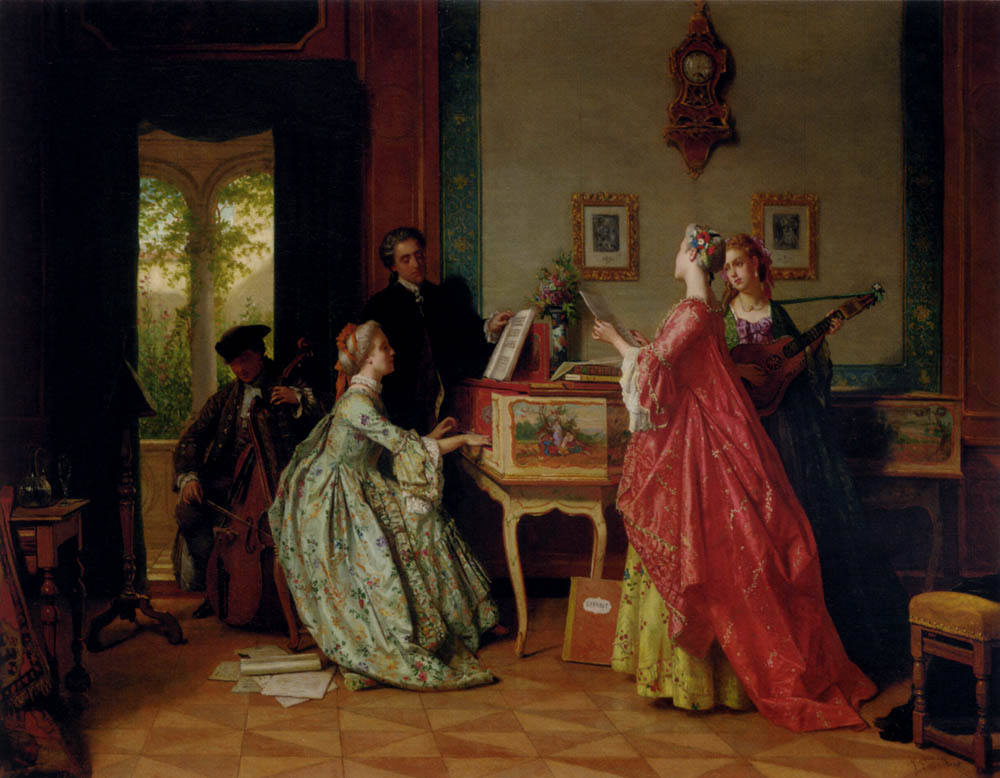
Jean Carolus, The Recital, oil on canvas, 82 x 105.4 cm, public collection

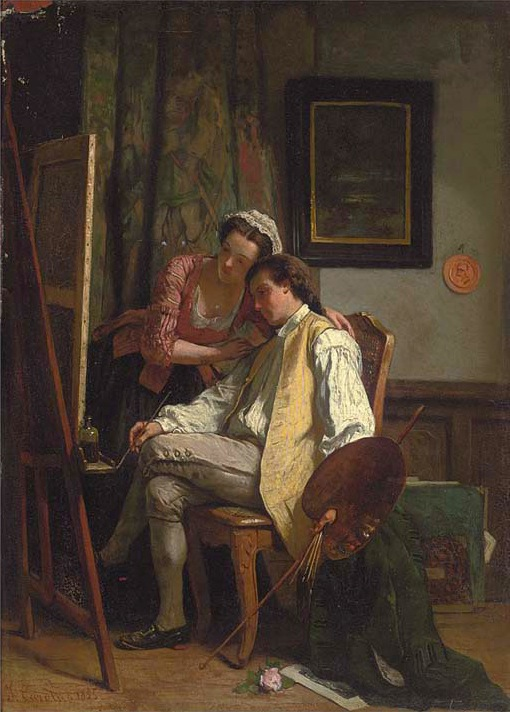
Jean Carolus, 1855, The Finishing Touches, oil on panel, 42.5 x 30.5 cm

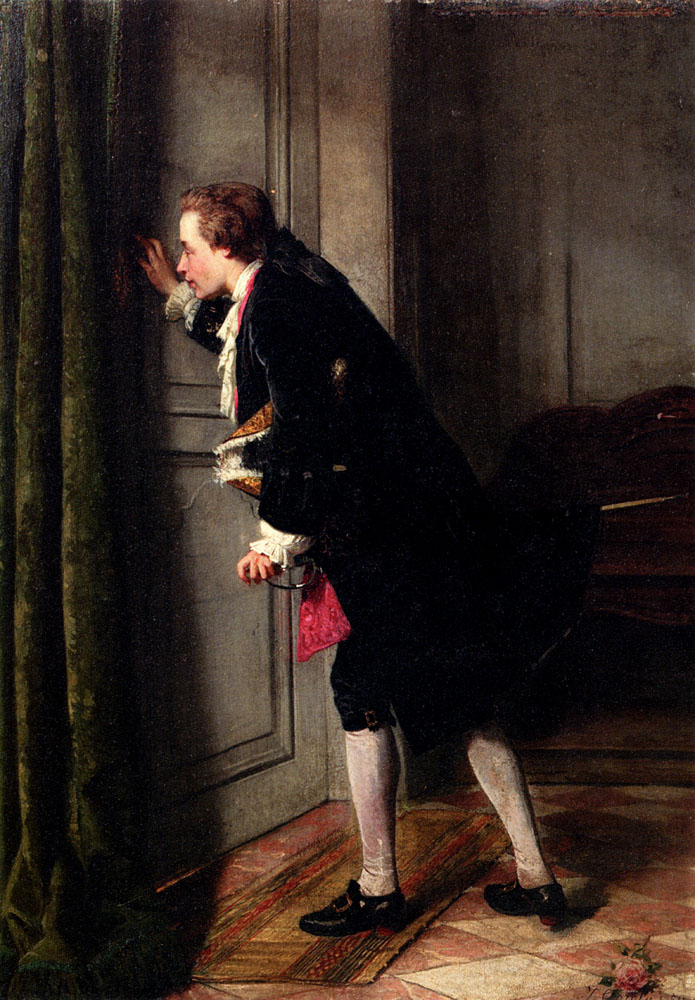
Jean Carolus, Peeping Tom, oil on panel, 46.5 x 32.5 cm, private collection

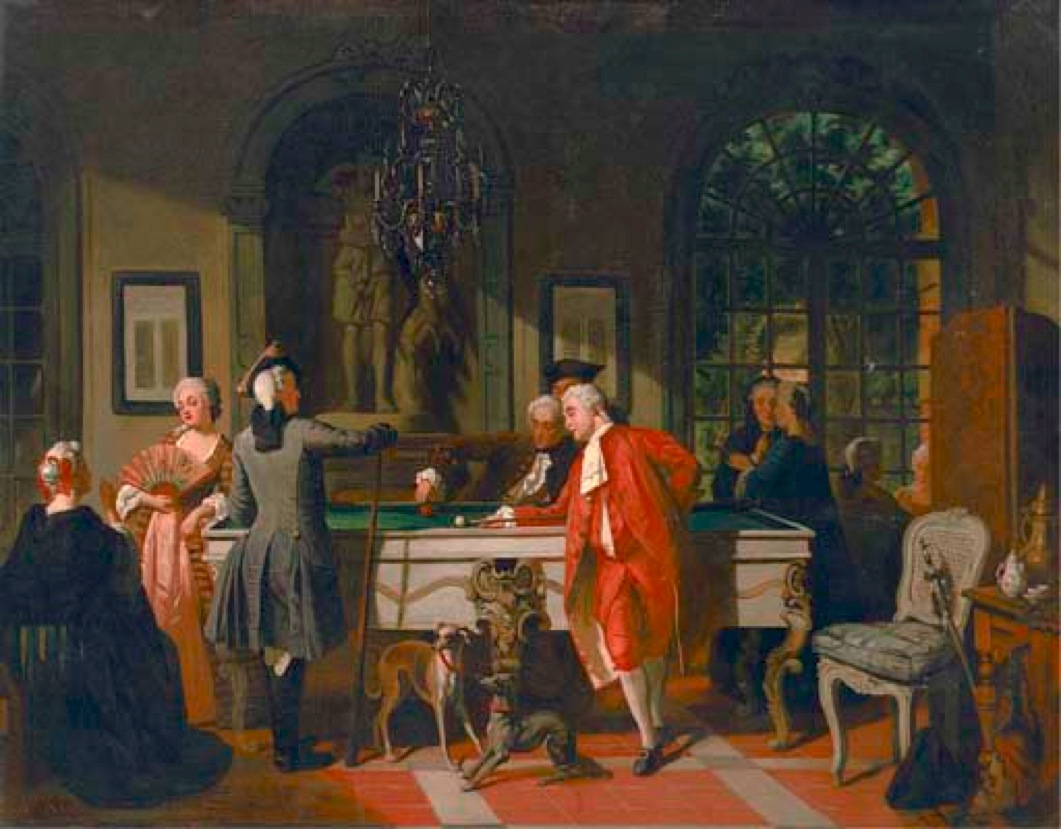
Jean Carolus, 1855, La partie de billard sous Louis XV (A Game of Billiards under Louis XV), oil on canvas, 74.3 x 96 cm
