= Collège Saint-François-Xavier =

Saint Francis Xavier College
- Collège Saint-François-Xavier

Location
- Verviers; Belgium
- Coordinates: 50.59139°N 5.861356°E

Information
- Type: Secondary school
- Religious affiliation: Catholic
- Established: 1855
- Director: Anthony Cipolla
- Affiliation: Jesuits
- Website: SFX1-Verviers.be

Collège Saint-François-Xavier is a mixed Catholic secondary school in Verviers, Belgium. It was founded in 1855 by the Jesuits. It is located on Rue de Rome in the centre of the city. It is now known as SFX un. In 1984, the old Institut des Saint-Anges in the city centre became SFX deux.

== History ==
In 1845, the Jesuits came to work in Verviers. They had a community on Rue du Collège. In 1855, while the main building of the school was being built on Rue de Rome, the school opened. It was initially a small school in the same building as the Jesuit community and had 60 pupils. In 1878, after the opening of more buildings, the number of pupils was 398. During the First World War, the school was briefly requisitioned by the occupying German forces, before classes resumed for most of the duration of the war. During the Second World War, the school was damaged by bombardment from the Fort de Fléron in the mistaken belief that the German forces were in the city. On 3 September 1944, a teacher from the school, Fr René Lange, was killed by the SS after he refused to give the names of the leaders of the local resistance. A street in Verviers is named after him.

In May 1968, girls were first admitted to the primary school section. In 1980, they were further admitted to the secondary school. Between June and August 1984, the nearby Institut des Saint-Anges on Rue de Francorchamps became the Institut Saint-François-Xavier or SFX deux. In November 2012, plans to merge the three local schools, SFX un, SFX deux and Collège Saint-Michel were abandoned.

== Status ==
The college is part of the association of 'Jesuit Colleges and Institutes of French-speaking Belgium' as well as the General Secretariat of Catholic Education (French: Secrétariat Général de l’Enseignement Catholique).

== See also ==
- Ratio Studiorum
- List of Jesuit sites in Belgium
- Diocese of Liège
