= Emile Pierre Joseph De Cauwer =

Belgian architectural painter (1828–1873)

Émile De Cauwer
- Born: Émile Pierre Joseph De Cauwer ca. 1828; Ghent, Kingdom of the Netherlands
- Died: 30 January 1873; Berlin, Germany
- Occupation: Painter

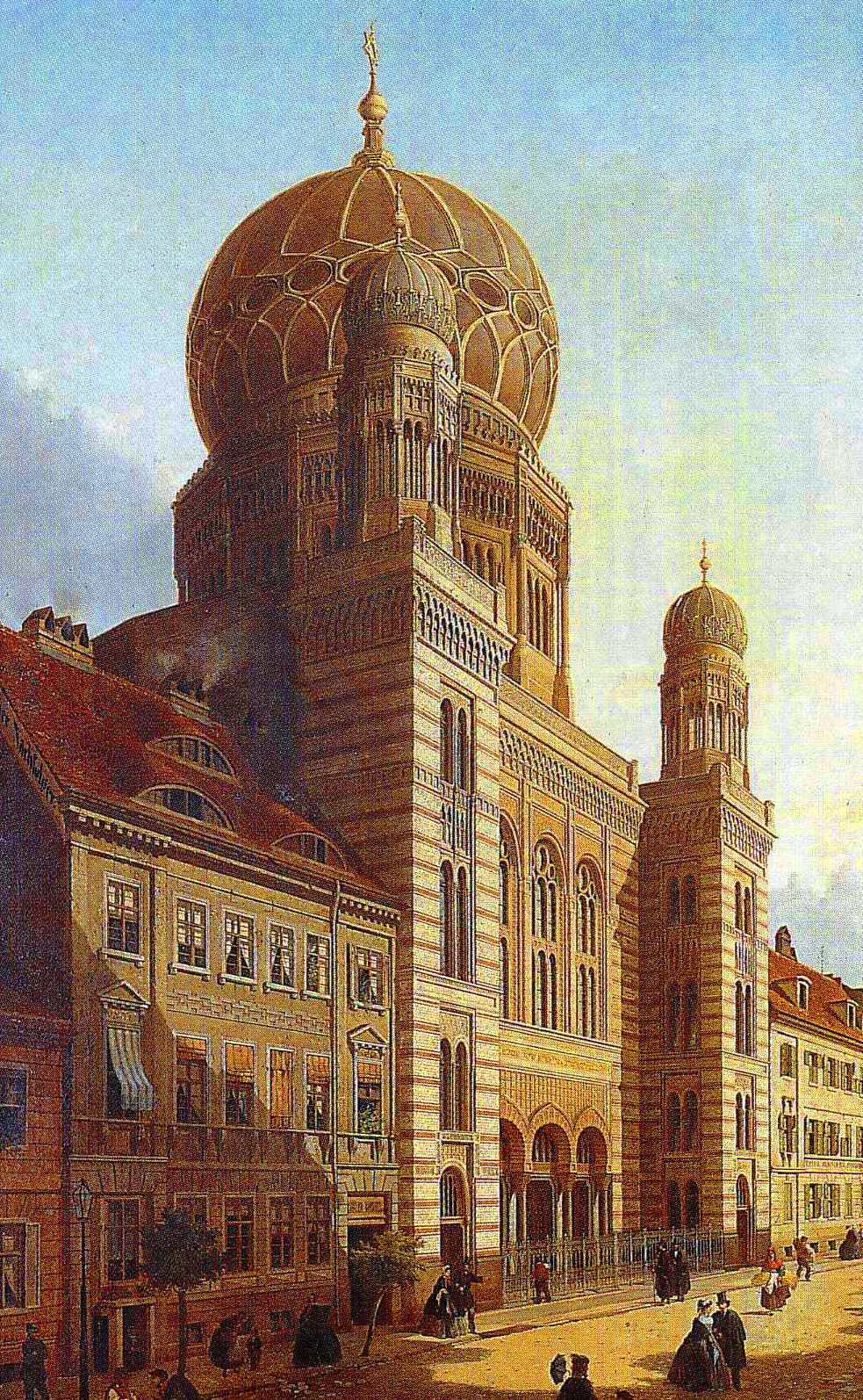
New Synagogue, Berlin, 1865: now at the Märkisches Museum

Émile Pierre Joseph De Cauwer (1828 – 30 January 1873) was a painter of architectural subjects. He was a pupil of his father, Joseph De Cauwer. He painted careful, detailed studies of buildings, amongst them the Church of St. Martin at Oudenarde, the Town Hall at Oudenarde, and the New Synagogue at Berlin. He died in Berlin in 1873.

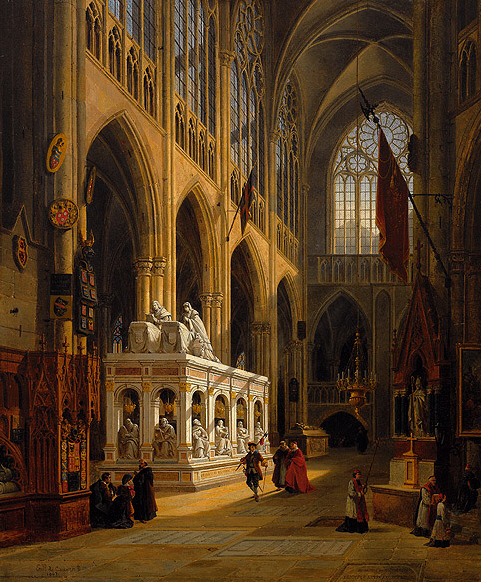
Mausoleum of King Louis XII and Anne of Brittany in the Church of Saint-Denis, Saint-Denis (France), 1867
