= Charles Leickert =

Dutch painter (1816–1907)

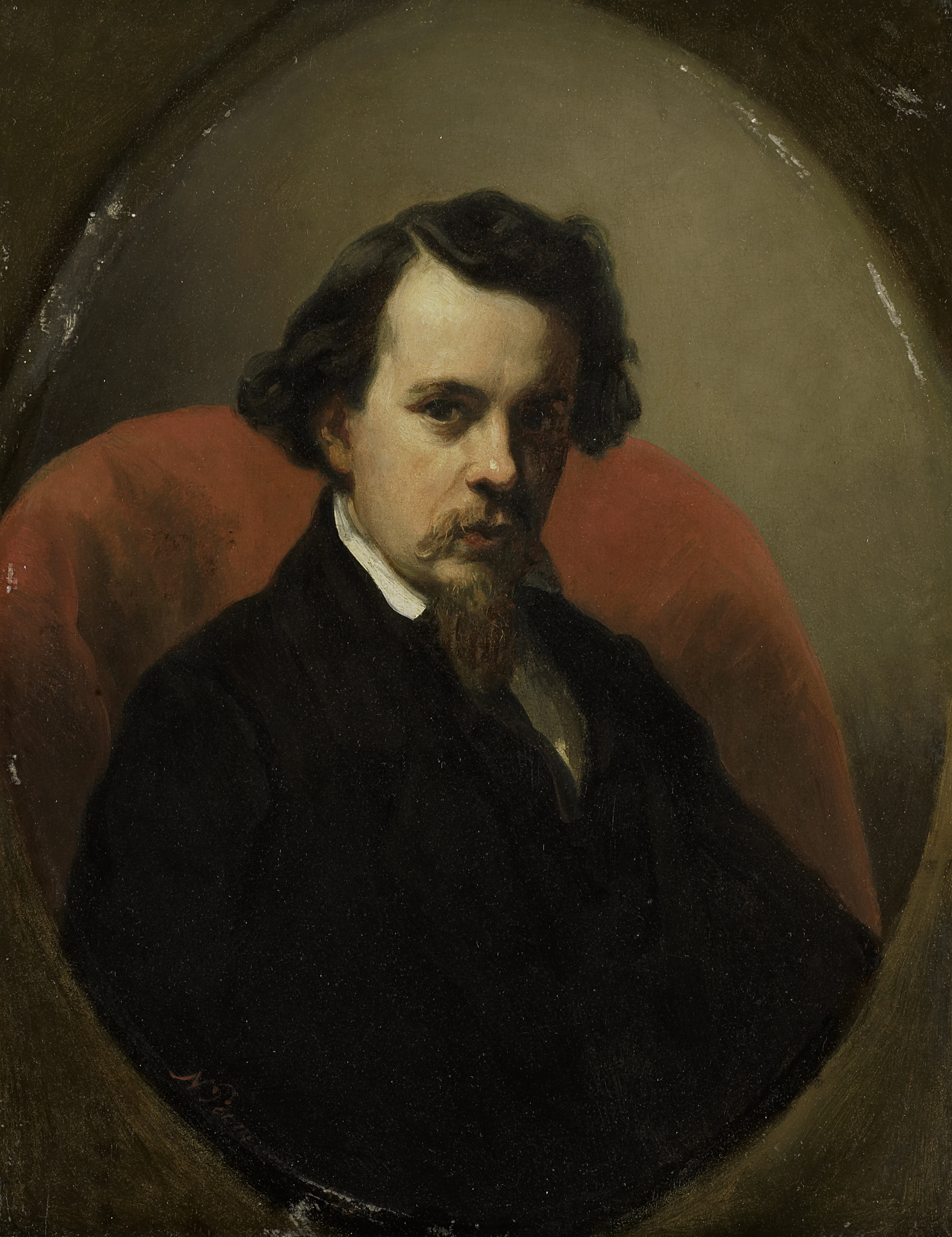
Portrait of Charles Leickert by Nicolaas Pieneman (1853)

Charles Henri Joseph Leickert (22 September 1816, Brussels – 5 December 1907, Mainz) was a Dutch painter of landscapes. As a specialist in winter landscapes, he explored the nuances of the evening sky and the rosy-fingered dawn.

== Biography ==
Charles Leickert first learned painting in The Hague under the supervision of landscape painters Bartholomeus van Hove, Wijnand Nuijen, and Andreas Schelfhout, among many others. Leickert specialised in winter scenes, sometimes romanticising the sky in pale blues and bright pinks, but he is equally well known for numerous cityscapes. He painted almost all of his works in the Netherlands, in The Hague from 1841 to 1846 and in Amsterdam from 1849 to 1883. In 1856, he became a member of the Royal Academy of Amsterdam. At the age of 71, he moved to Mainz, Germany, where he died in 1907.

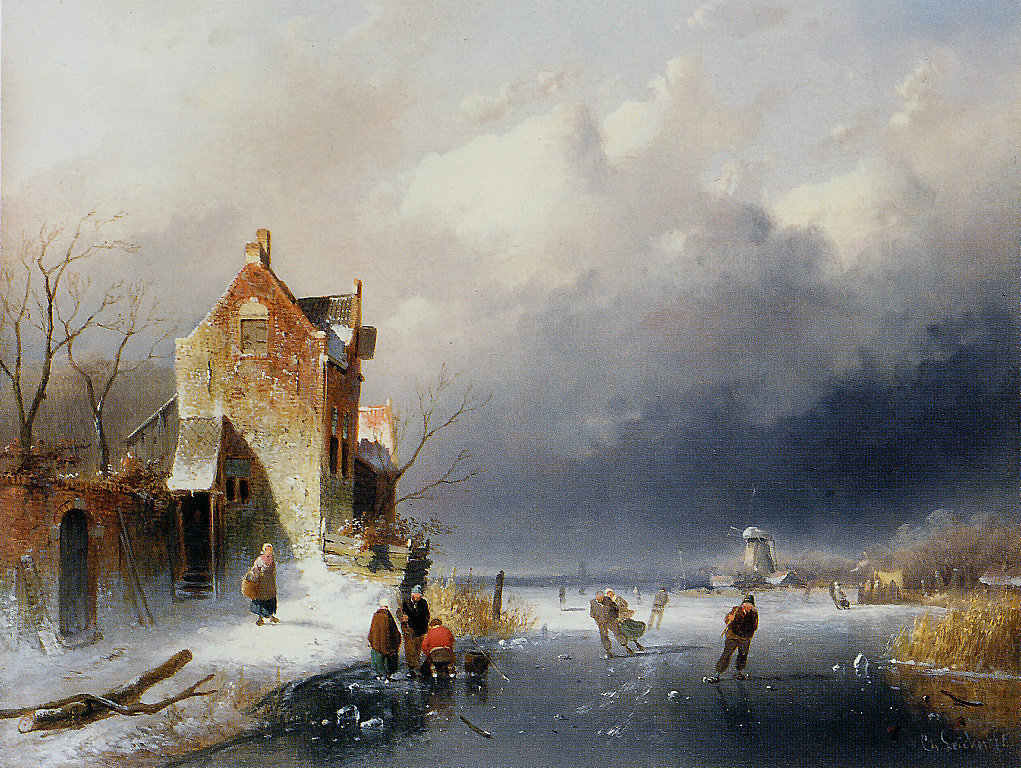
Ice View With Skaters

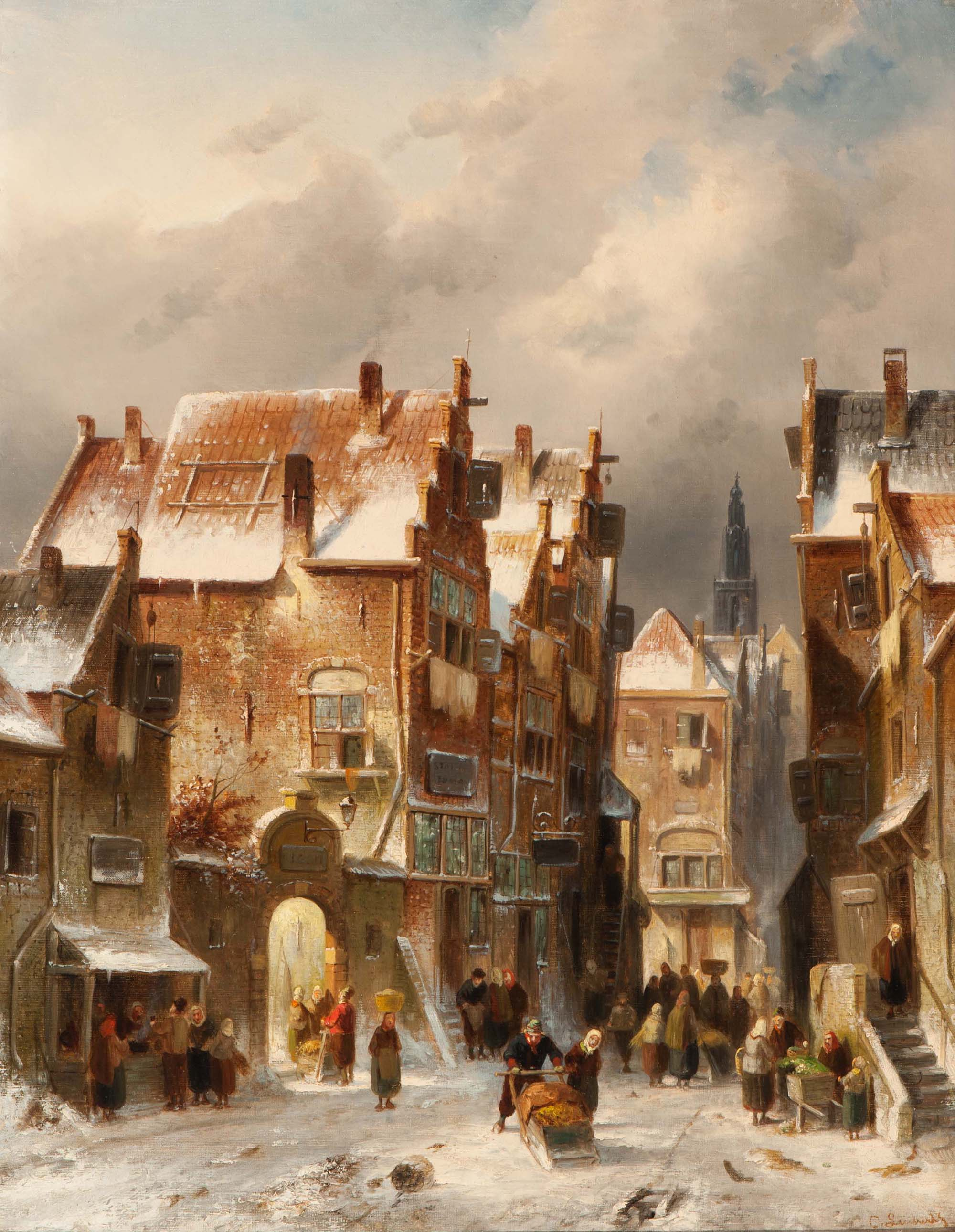
Snowy street in Haarlem of Charles Leickert
