= François Joseph Ferdinand Marchal =

Belgian historian and archivist

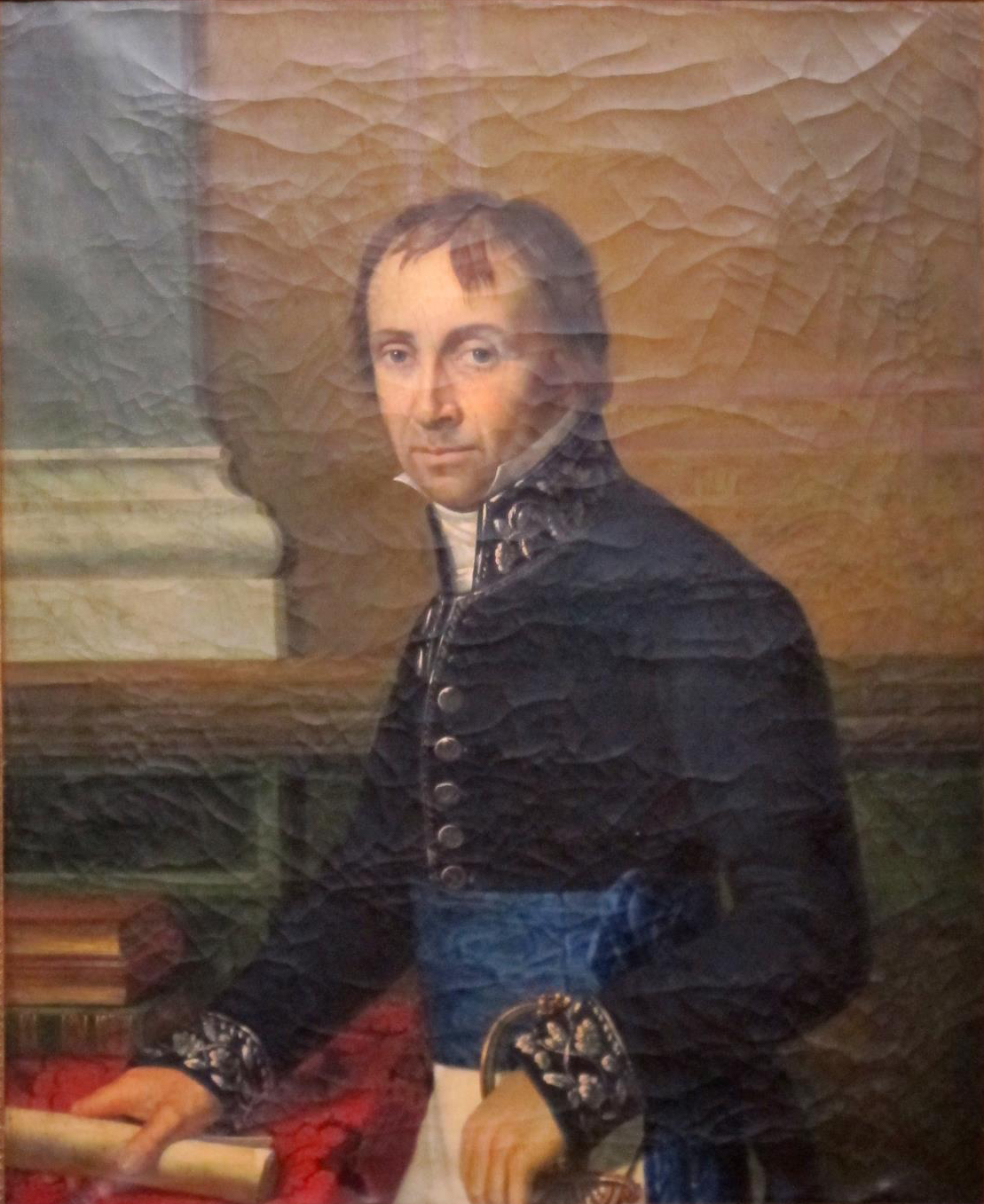

François Joseph Ferdinand Marchal (1780–1858), knight, was a civil servant in the First French Empire who became a Belgian historian and archivist.

== Life ==
Marchal was born in Brussels and was baptised there on 9 December 1780. His father was Jean-Nicolas Marchal, who had been professor of architecture at the military school in Mechelen and assisted Joseph de Ferraris in the production of the Ferraris map, and his mother was Marie-Anne de Rinonville, reputedly a natural daughter of Prince Charles Alexander of Lorraine. He was educated at the Theresian College in Brussels and at the Collège de France. In 1800 he assisted the librarian of the École Centrale in Brussels in cataloguing the books confiscated from pre-revolutionary institutions. In 1803 he was appointed salpeterer of Halle and Lennik, in 1807 manager of the domain of Montmédy, and in 1808 to an administrative position in the Grande Armée. In 1809 he transferred to the administration of the newly incorporated Illyrian Provinces of the Napoleonic Empire. With the loss of the Illyrian Provinces he returned to Paris, where he enjoyed the patronage of General Bertrand, and after the Battle of Waterloo he briefly served in the local administration in Montmédy before seeking public employment in Brussels, which had just become the southern capital of the United Kingdom of the Netherlands.

Unsuccessful in his pursuit of preferment in Brussels, in 1819 Marchal joined the Dutch colonial service, arriving in the Dutch East Indies in June 1820. Finding his poor command of Dutch an impediment to his career, he returned to the Low Countries in 1822. He worked as a publicist and translator for a number of years, before being appointed to the Royal Archives in Brussels in 1827. On 4 February 1829 he was elected to the Royal Academy of Science, Letters and Fine Arts of Belgium. He also provided a course of history lectures at the Établissement Géographique de Bruxelles and later at the École de Commerce et d'Industrie.

In 1830 the manuscripts of the Library of Burgundy, which had become part of the public library of the city of Brussels, were transferred to the Royal Archives, and in 1831 Marchal was appointed their conservator. He had several manuscripts rebound and began work on cataloguing them. In 1838 the Library of Burgundy was incorporated into the newly founded Royal Library of Belgium, headed by Frédéric de Reiffenberg, but with Marchal retaining the position of "Conservator of the Library of Burgundy". In 1850, when Louis-Joseph Alvin was appointed to succeed Reiffenberg, Marchal felt passed over. In August 1857 he retired with a pension. He died of an apoplexy at home in Schaerbeek on 22 April 1858.

== Honours ==
Marchal was knighted in 1845, and in 1856 was made a knight in the Order of Leopold. He also received honours from the governments of France, Prussia, Portugal and Brazil.

== Publications ==
- Analyse raisonnée de la chronologie des principaux états de la terre
- Essai historique sur Charles Martel
- Plan d'histoire ancienne à l'époque du triumvirat de César, Pompée et Crassus
- Mémoire sur l'histoire et l'organisation de l'Illyrie (unpublished)
- Musée de Bruxelles ou Description des principaux tableaux qu'il renferme
- Stamford Raffles and John Crawfurd, Description géographique, historique et commerciale de Java et des autres îles de l'archipel Indien, translated by Marchal (Brussels, 1824)
- Essai de mnémotechnie, adaptée à l'histoire de Hollande (Brussels, 1826)
- Notice sur l'origine et les accroissements de la ville de Bruxelles (Brussels, 1826)
- Collin de Plancy, Guide des voyageurs dans Bruxelles, revised and augmented by Marchal, (Brussels, 1827)
- Considérations sur l'ancien empire grec et sur les progrès de la Russie, de la Grande-Bretagne et des Pays-Bas dans la domination de tout l'orient de l'ancien monde (Brussels, 1828)
- Compagnie du pont sous la Tamise, commencé le 24 juin 1824, translated by Marchal (Brussels, 1828)
- John Barton, Lecture sur la géographie des plantes, translated by Marchal (Brussels, 1829)
- Mémoire sur la date du diplôme de l'empereur Othon le Grand qui confère le titre d'avoué de l'abbaye de Gembloux à Lambert, comte de Louvain (1830)
- Histoire des Pays-Bas autrichiens (1841)
- Notice sur les relations commerciales des Flamands avec le port d'Alexandrie, avant la découverte du cap de Bonne-Espérance (1844)
- Relation inédite de l'ambassade de Federigo Badovare, par ordre du grand conseil de Venise, à la cour de l'empereur Charles-Quint et du roi Philippe II à Bruxelles, en 1557 (1845)
- Notice sur les chartes de la ville de Virton et sur la coutume de Beaumont, en Ardenne (1846)
- Notice sur un manuscrit de l'ancienne bibliothèque de Bourgogne, intitulé: Relation des particularités et cérémonies passées à Bruxelles, lors de la publication des patentes royales de la cession des Pays-Bas [...] les xxie et xxiie d'aoust de l'an 1598 (1846)
- Fastes historiques, généalogiques et chronologiques de la Belgique et des autres provinces des Pays-Bas, depuis les temps les plus rendes jusqu'à nos jours, 488–1847 (1847)
- Notice sur la carte géographique et héraldique du Franc de Bruges, ouvrage de Pierre Pourbus, d'après plusieurs manuscrits de la bibliothèque royale (1847)
- De la fuite de Judith, reine douairière de West-Sex, avec le comte Baudouin, et de l'inféodation du marquisat de Flandre (1847)
- Les Projets de Philippe-Auguste, roi de France, pour la réunion de la Flandre à la couronne (1848)
- Notice sur la Croatie militaire et sur les autres provinces illyriennes, sous l'empire de Napoléon (1848)
- Seconde notice sur les provinces illyriennes, continuation de l'analyse du manuscrit 11600 de la bibliothèque royale (1851)
- Description des funérailles d'Anne de Bretagne, analyse du manuscrit 10445 de la bibliothèque royale (1850)
- Notice sur les funérailles de l'infante Isabelle, d'après deux manuscrits de Colbrant, premier roi d'armes (1851)
- Notice sur l'extinction de l'ordre des Templiers (1852)
- Voyage de Ferdinand, cardinal-infant, depuis Madrid jusqu'à Bruxelles (1852)
- Notice sur Michel-Florent van Langren, cosmographe et mathématicien des archiducs Albert et Isabelle et ensuite de Philippe IV, roi d'Espagne (1852)
- Notice concernant l'extinction de l'esclavage (1853)
- Relation inédite concernant l'ambassade envoyée en 1597 par l'empereur Rodolphe II à Ivan IV Vassilowich, grand-duc de Moscovie (1851)
- Notice sur les droits du comte d'Egmont à la succession de la souveraineté du duché de Gueldre et du comté de Zutphen (1854)
- Histoire politique du règne de l'empereur Charles-Quint (1856)
