= Henri de Brouckère =

Belgian politician (1801–1891)

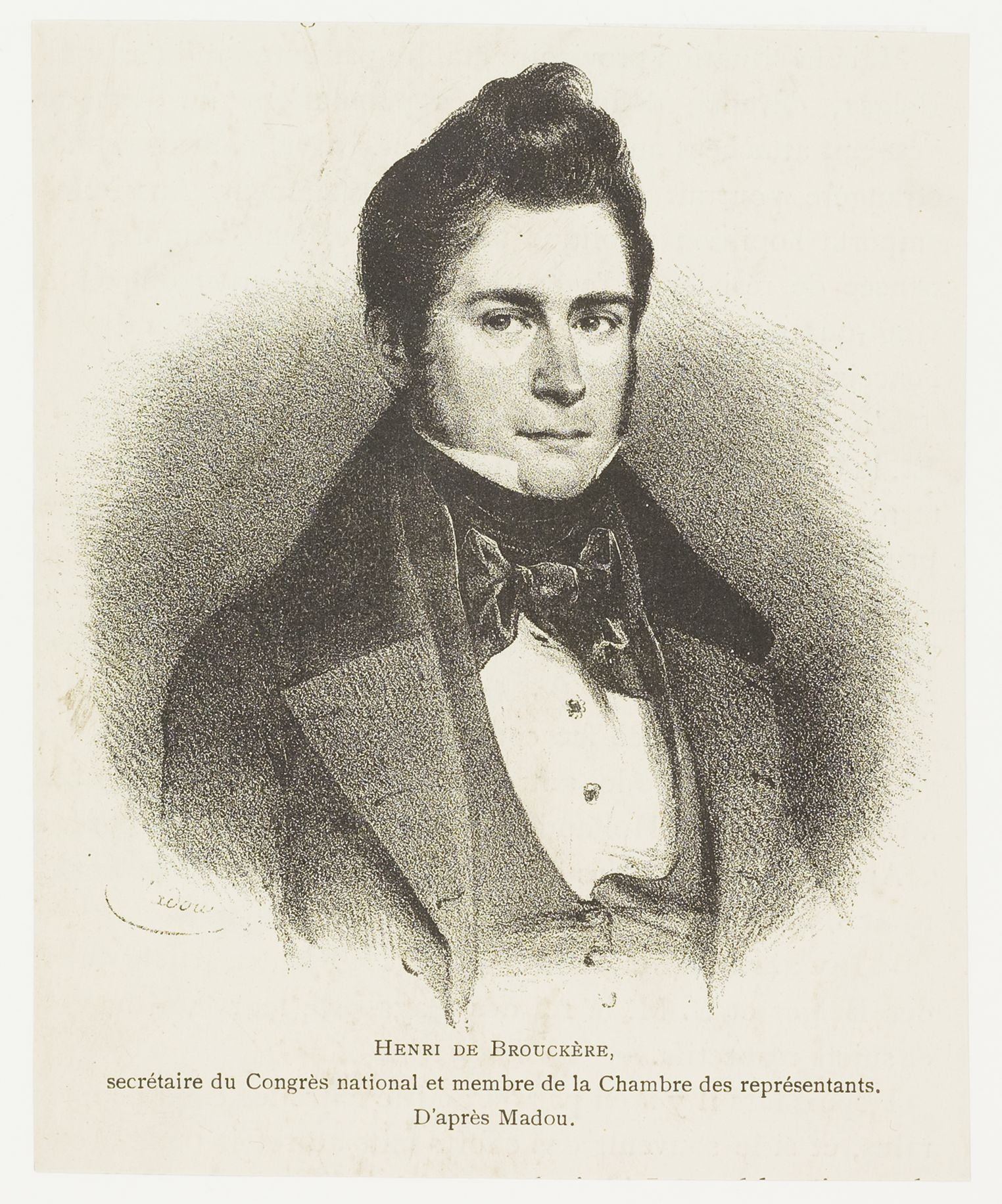

Prime Minister of Belgium
- In office 31 October 1852 – 30 March 1855
- Monarch: Leopold I
- Preceded by: Charles Rogier
- Succeeded by: Pierre de Decker

Personal details
- Born: 25 January 1801 Bruges, France (now Belgium)
- Died: 25 January 1891 (aged 90) Brussels, Belgium
- Party: Liberal Party

Jonkheer Henri Ghislain Joseph Marie Hyacinthe de Brouckère (25 January 1801 – 25 January 1891) was a Belgian nobleman and liberal politician. Born in Bruges, he was a magistrate and a professor at the Université libre de Bruxelles. His brother Charles was mayor of the City of Brussels.

He served as governor of Antwerp from 1840 to 1844, and of Liège from 1844 to 1846. He headed a Liberal government from 1852 to 1855 as the prime minister. In 1863 he became the first mayor of Auderghem. He later chaired the Caisse générale d'épargne et de retraite.

== Honours ==
National

- Belgium:
  - Iron Cross.
  - Minister of State, by Royal Decree.
  - Grand Cordon in the Order of Leopold.
  - Commander in the Royal Order of the Lion.

Foreign

- Saxe-Coburg and Gotha: Knight Grand Cross in the Saxe-Ernestine House Order.
- Austrian Empire:Knight Grand Cross in the Order of Leopold of Austria.
- France: Knight Grand Cross in the Legion of Honour.
- Holy See: Knight Grand Cross in the Order of Charles III.
- Kingdom of Italy: Knight Grand Cross in the Order of Saints Maurice and Lazarus
- Knight Grand Cross in the Order of Saint Gregory the Great, 1850.
- Knight Grand Cross in the Order of Saint Januarius.
- Kingdom of Portugal:Knight Grand Cross in the Order of Christ.
- Knight Grand Cross in the Order of Saint Louis.
- Kingdom of the Netherlands:Commander of the Order of the Netherlands Lion.
- Kingdom of Prussia:Knight 1st class; Order of the Red Eagle.

Political offices
Preceded by Charles Rogier	Governor of Antwerp; 1840–1844	Succeeded by Jules Malou
Preceded by Charles Rogier	Prime Minister of Belgium; 1852–1855	Succeeded by Pierre de Decker
