= Pierre de Decker =

Belgian Roman Catholic politician, statesman and author

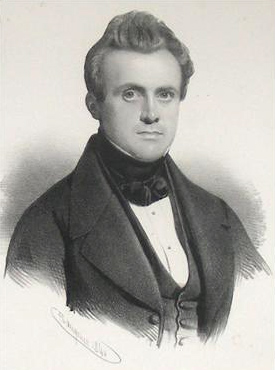

Prime Minister of Belgium
- In office 30 March 1855 – 9 November 1857
- Monarch: Leopold I
- Preceded by: Henri de Brouckère
- Succeeded by: Charles Rogier

Personal details
- Born: 25 January 1812 Zele
- Died: 4 January 1891 (aged 78) Schaerbeek
- Party: Catholic Party

Pierre (Pieter) Jacques François de Decker (25 January 1812 – 4 January 1891) was a Belgian Roman Catholic politician, statesman and author who served as the Prime Minister of Belgium from 1855 to 1857.

He was educated at a Jesuit school, studied law at Paris, and became one of the editors of the Revue de Bruxelles. In 1839 he was elected to the Belgian lower chamber, where he gained a great reputation for oratory. He was a member of parliament from 1839 to 1866. As such he took historic initiatives to promote the Dutch language that had lost ground in political life since the Belgian Revolution of 1830 (against the Union with Holland as the United Kingdom of the Netherlands) even though the majority of the population spoke Dutch. De Decker was at the origin of a 'Petition in favour of the Flemish language' in 1840 and of the setting up of a 'Committee on Flemish Grievances' in 1855.

In 1855 he became Minister of the Interior and the prime minister of Belgium. As such he was the first leader of the government since the revolution of 1830 who dared to address the parliament in Dutch (Flemish). He attempted, by combining the moderate elements of the Catholic and Liberal parties, the impossible task of resolving the educational and other questions then dividing Belgium.

In 1866 he retired from politics and went into business, with disastrous results. He became involved in financial speculations which lost him his good name as well as the greater part of his fortune; and, though he was never proved to have been more than the victim of clever operators, when in 1871 he was appointed by the Catholic cabinet governor of Limburg, the outcry was so great that he resigned the appointment and retired definitively into private life. He died in 1891.

== Bibliography ==
De Decker, who was a member of the Belgian academy, wrote several historical and other works of value, of which the most notable are:

- Etudes historiques et critiques sur les monts-de-piété en Belgique (Brussels, 1844)
- De l'influence du libre arbitre de l'homme sur les fails sociaux (1848)
- L'esprit de parti et l'esprit national (1852)
- Etude politique sur le vicomte Ch. Vilain Xliii (1879)
- Episodes de l'histoire de l'art en Belgique (1883)
- Biographie de H. Conscience (1885)

Political offices
Preceded by Henri de Brouckère	Prime Minister of Belgium; 1855–1857	Succeeded by Charles Rogier
