= Jean Auguste Ulric Scheler =

Belgian philologist

Jean Auguste Ulric Scheler (1819–1890), also styled Auguste Scheler was a Belgian philologist.

== Biography ==
He was born at Ebnat, Switzerland. His father, a German, was chaplain to King Leopold I of Belgium, and Jean Scheler, after studying at Bonn and Munich, became King's librarian, and professor at the Universite Libre de Bruxelles. His investigations in Romance philology earned him a wide reputation. He died at Ixelles, Belgium, in 1890.

== Works ==
The most important of his numerous philological works are:

- Mémoire sur la conjugaison française considérée sous le rapport étymologique (Brussels, 1847)
- Dictionnaire d'étymologie française d'après les résultats de la science moderne (Brussels, 1862)
- Étude sur la transformation française des mots latins (Ghent, 1869)

He also edited the fourth edition of Diez's Etymologisches Wörterbuch der romanischen Sprachen (Bonn, 1878), and completed Grandgagnage's Dictionnaire étymologique de la langue wallonne (Louvain, 1880). He also published several critical editions of Middle Ages texts, including one of Les Poésies de Froissart (Brussels, 1870–1872), and a monograph Sur le séjour de l'apôtre saint Pierre a Rome (Brussels, 1845), which was translated into German and English. He contributed to the 1876 Annales de L’Académie d’Archéologie de Belgique with an article titled "Deux Redactions Diverses de la Legende de Sainte Marguerite en vers Français".
