= Jean-Joseph Thonissen =

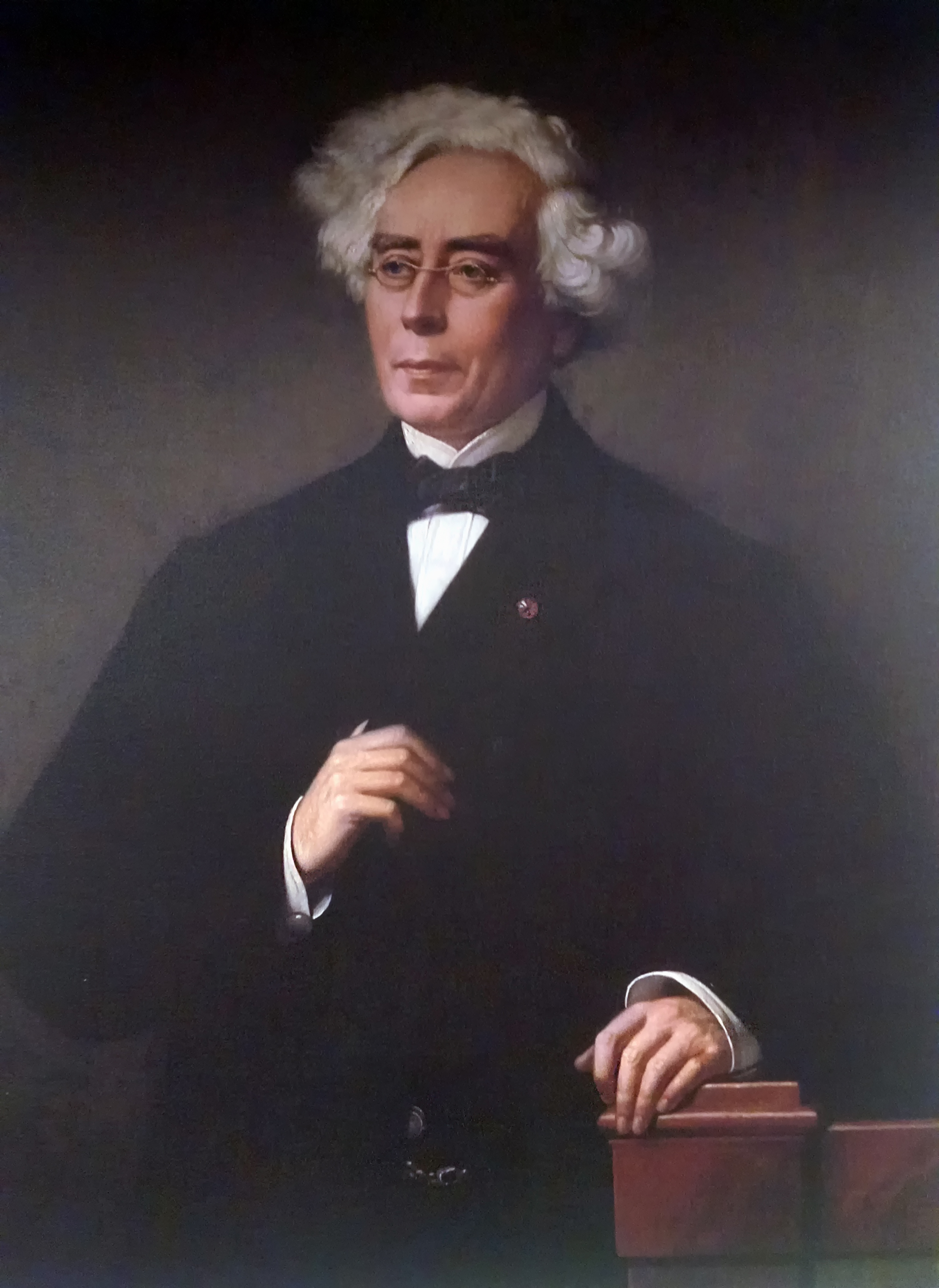
Thonissen, by Godfried Guffens

Jean-Joseph Thonissen (b. Hasselt, Limburg, 21 Jan., 1817; d. Leuven, 17 Aug., 1891) was a professor of law at the Catholic University of Leuven and a minister in the Belgian Government.

== Legal career ==
Thonissen first performed duties in the magistracy and the administration of Limburg, but was occupied with juridical works on penal law. When dismissed by the Liberal (anti-clerical) ministry, the University of Leuven appointed him in 1848 to the chair of criminal law. In 1863 he was elected to Parliament.

Although he achieved his fame in his chosen field of penal law, his writings covered varied points of history and social science, as was evidenced by the fact that in 1886 the national jury of social sciences awarded him the prize. In penal matters he began with commentaries on the penal code and devoted himself especially to the reform of the penal procedure which he advocated while he was minister. He had conceived the vast plan of a history of criminal law, but realized only a part of it. The first part, which met with considerable success, dealt with Brahminical India, Egypt, and Judea, and contained a "Penal Code of the Pentateuch". He published a work on the penal law of the Athenian Republic. Considering the Roman period as sufficiently well-known, he took up the Frankish period, which he was unable to finish. He aroused controversy by advocating the abolition of the death penalty, which his influence helped bring about in Belgium. While not rejecting it as absolutely unlawful, Thonissen considered it useless in the social condition of the time.

He showed a marked preference for national political history, his principal work on the subject being the History of the Reign of Leopold I. He also published biographies of prominent Belgians such as Félix de Mérode. He had been impressed by the Revolution of 1848 which determined his career and he devoted himself to a laborious study of innovating systems, especially of the Utopian Socialists - Henri de Saint-Simon, Charles Fourier, Étienne Cabet, Robert Owen, Louis Blanc, and others, being led eventually to write a history of Socialism from ancient times to 1852. These works and many others secured his admission to the Royal Academy of Belgium and the Institut de France; he was commissioned by the former institution to write the volume devoted to its centenary (1872).

== Political career ==
Thonissen's political career began in 1863 and was never interrupted by his constituents. In the Chamber he functioned as a jurisconsult and drafted many of the parliamentary reports. He occupied a unique position owing to his independence which made him disagree with the Right on certain points, for instance, on military matters. He was deeply attached to the Constitution of Belgium of 1831, which contained articles proclaiming liberty of worship, of the press, etc. Although a devoted Catholic he was a Liberal, and regarded liberties as a natural right, and defended this opinion in his commentary on the Constitution (1844). After the Pope's decisions on these matters, he changed his ideas, but always had a leaning towards solutions favouring broad tolerance.

In 1872, during a period of turmoil, the King entrusted him with the formation of a ministry, he was not supported by his party, which dreaded concessions to the Left or to the Crown. When he finally entered the ministry (1884), age had rendered him unfit for hard work, though he was able to enforce the new school law which the victorious Right had substituted for the lay regime of 1879; this task consumed the last of his strength and left him unable to resume his scientific pursuits in his retirement (1887); his faculties soon became clouded.

== Writings ==
- Constitution belge annotée (1844)
- Le socialisme et ses promesses, 2 volumes (1850)
- La Belgique sous le règne de Léopold I, 4 volumes (1855–1858)
- Vie du comte Félix de Mérode (1861)
- De la prétendue nécessité de la peine de mort (1862)
- Etudes sur l'histoire du droit criminel des peuples anciens (1869)
