= Annales de pomologie belge et étrangère =

Illustrated pomology review

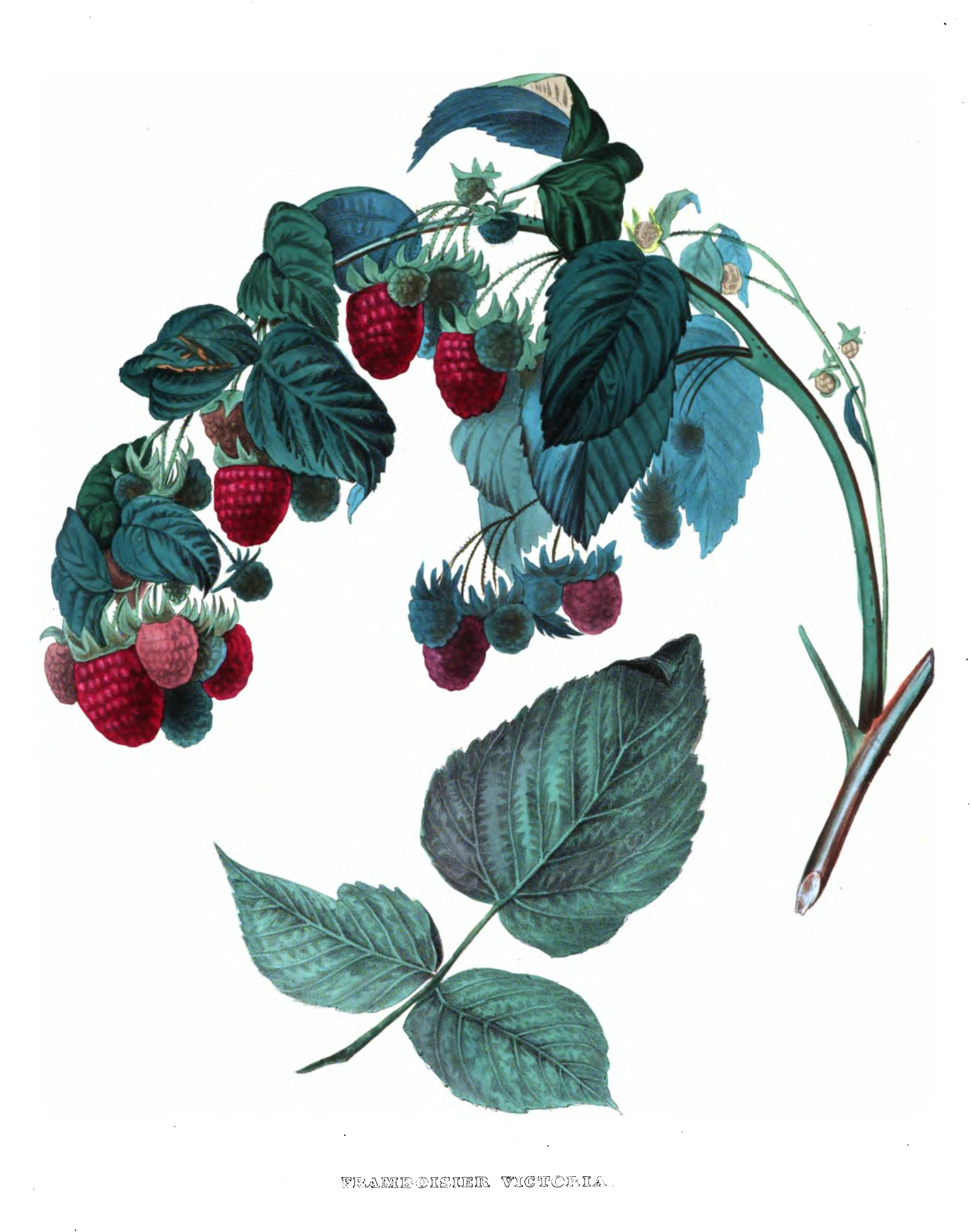
- Victoria raspberry from volume 1 (1853).
- Editor: Alexandre Bivort
- Categories: Horticulture
- Frequency: annual
- Publisher: Commission Royale de Pomologie
- First issue: 1853
- Final issue: 1860
- Country: Belgium
- Based in: Brussels
- Language: French
- Website: On Wikisource (French)

Annales de pomologie belge et étrangère (1853–1860) was an illustrated pomology review published annually by the Belgian Commission Royale de Pomologie, with Alexandre Bivort as secretary of the editorial committee (effectively editor in chief). It was printed in Brussels, first by F. Parent (1853-1858) and then by his widow and son (1859-1860).

Apart from Bivort himself, contributors to the Annales included Charles and Ernest Baltet, Laurent de Bavay, Jules de Liron d’Airoles, Antoine-Joseph Gailly, Charles Auguste Hennau, Alfred Loisel, Auguste Royer, Félix Sahut, and Michel Scheidweiler.

Many of the illustrations were fine coloured lithographs, then a Belgian specialism in horticultural illustration, with no indication of the artists involved in their production.

The full run of colour illustrations has been republished as Annales de pomologie belge et étrangère: dessins et descriptions de 450 fruits (Naturalia, 2002; ISBN 9782909717333).
