= Dillens =

Dillens is a surname. Notable people with the surname include:

- Adolf Alexander Dillens (1821–1877), Belgian painter, brother of Hendrick
- Hendrick Joseph Dillens (1812–1872), Belgian painter
- Julien Dillens (1849–1904), Belgian sculptor

== See also ==
- Dillen
