= Congress Column =

Monumental column in Brussels, Belgium

- Colonne du Congrès (French); Congreskolom (Dutch)
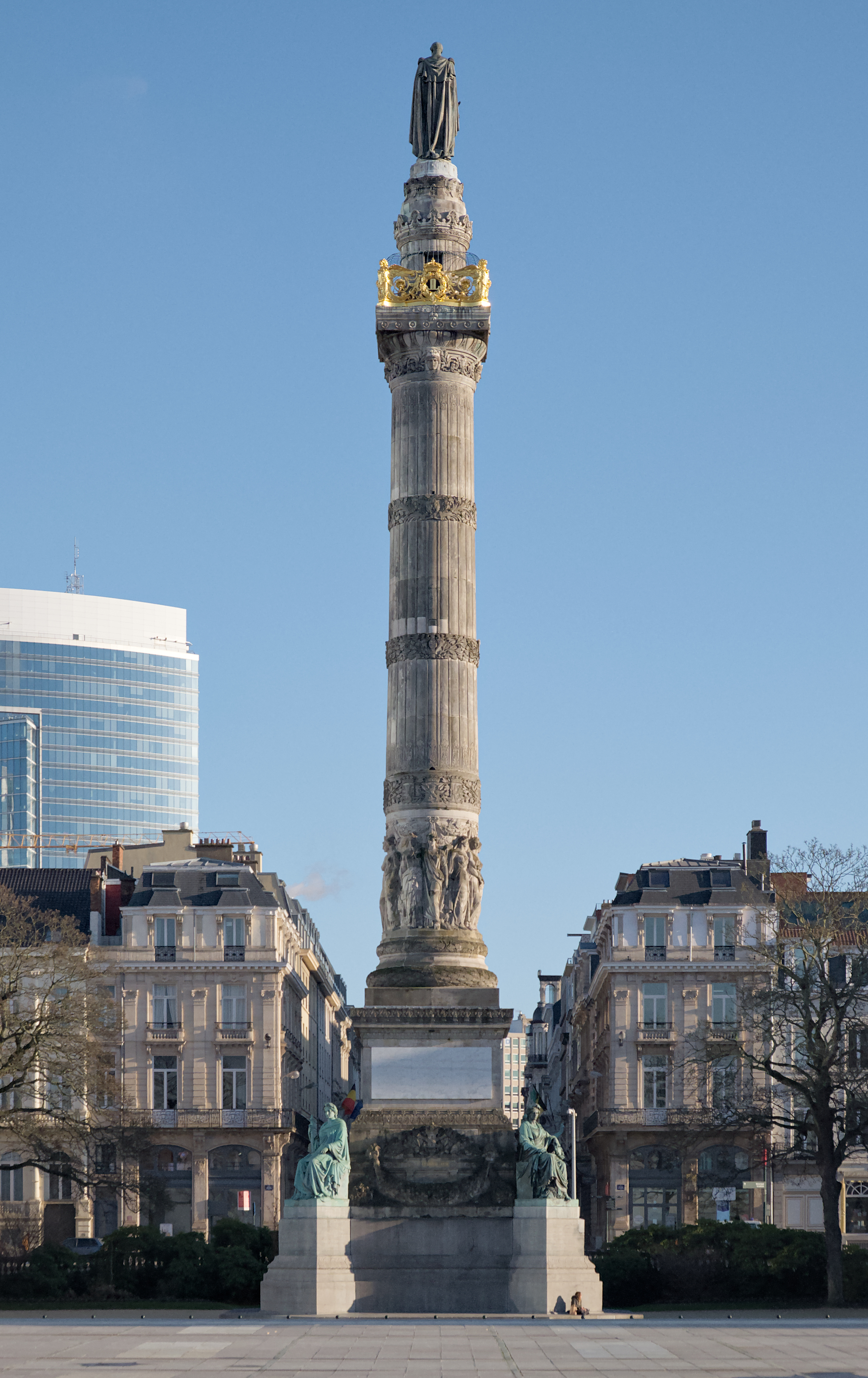
- Back view of the Congress Column

- Location within Brussels Congress Column (Belgium)
- 50°51′0″N 4°21′48″E
- Location: Place du Congrès / Congresplein; 1000 City of Brussels, Brussels-Capital Region, Belgium

History
- Inaugurated by: King Leopold I
- Built: 1850–1859
- Built for: Commemoration of the National Congress of Belgium

Site notes
- Elevation: 47 m (154 ft)
- Area: 1.63 a (1,750 sq ft)
- Architect: Joseph Poelaert
- Architectural styles: Neoclassicism (Victory column in Corinthian style)
- Restored: 1997–2008
- Owner: Belgian government

The Congress Column (French: Colonne du Congrès [kɔlɔn dy kɔ̃ɡʁɛ]; Dutch: Congreskolom [kɔŋˈɣrɛskoːˌlɔm]) is a monumental column in Brussels, Belgium, commemorating the National Congress of 1830–31 and the establishment of the Belgian Constitution.

Designed by the architect Joseph Poelaert and inspired by Trajan's Column in Rome, the column was erected between 1850 and 1859. Standing 47 metres (154 ft) tall, it is topped by a statue of King Leopold I, first King of the Belgians, and its pedestal is surrounded by four statues personifying the fundamental liberties enshrined in the Constitution. The Tomb of the Unknown Soldier, with an eternal flame, lies at its foot.

The monument stands at the centre of the Place du Congrès/Congresplein, a small square adjacent to the Rue Royale/Koningsstraat, in the Freedom Quarter.

== History ==
=== Background ===
Following Belgian independence in 1830, the desire to consolidate a still fragile identity led to a craze for monuments and an interest in national history. This fervent expression of patriotism, which mainly found its inspiration in the Middle Ages, resulted, for example, in the erection of a statue of Andreas Vesalius in the centre of the Place des Barricades/Barricadenplein, and another of the Counts of Egmont and Horn on the Grand-Place/Grote Markt (Brussels' main square). (Note: The latter was moved to the Square du Petit Sablon/Kleine Zavelsquare.)

At the same time, the new Rue Royale/Koningsstraat, which remained unbuilt in its middle on the western side, defined an open space then known as the Place des Panoramas/Panoramasplein (the current Place du Congrès/Congresplein), which offered a panoramic view of the city and its surroundings. In 1850, to commemorate independence and the work of the National Congress, which had laid the foundations of the Belgian state twenty years earlier, the Parliament, on the initiative of the then-Prime Minister of Belgium, Charles Rogier, thus decided to build a Congress Column on this site.

=== Construction (1850–1859) ===
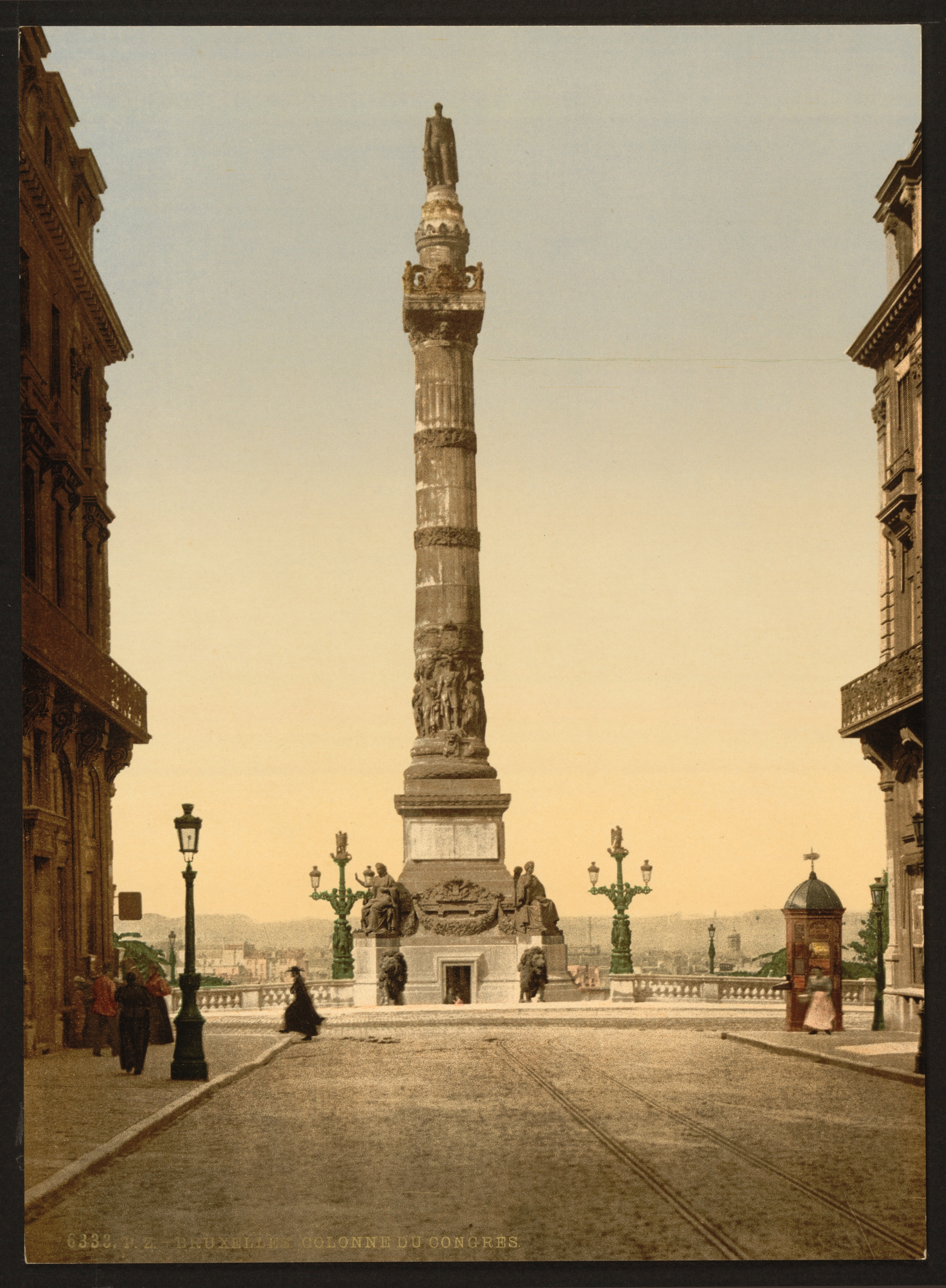
The Congress Column in the late 19th century

The first stone was laid in the presence of King Leopold I on 24 September 1850, and the monument was inaugurated on 26 September 1859. The architect Joseph Poelaert (who was later to also build Brussels' Palace of Justice) was responsible for the execution of the works, under the supervision of the Monuments Commission, and the sculptures of the monument were entrusted to five sculptors, amongst which Eugène Simonis.

In the centre of the Place des Panoramas, renamed the Place du Congrès for the occasion, the column became the focal point of the neighbouring Notre-Dame-aux-Neiges/Onze-Lieve-Vrouw-ter-Sneeuw district (today's Freedom Quarter). The development plans for this formerly mostly working-class district, which was cleaned up between 1875 and 1885, attempted to free up the perspective of the column and organise the road network around it accordingly. At the same time, the Dutch architect Jean-Pierre Cluysenaar took charge of creating, below the square, a covered market, which replaced some populous alleys or ill-famed dead-ends bordering the (now-disappeared) Rue des Cailles/Kwartelstraat.

=== 20th and 21st centuries ===
The Tomb of the Unknown Soldier, with an eternal flame, was installed at the foot of the Congress Column in 1922, in memory of the Belgian soldiers who died during World War I. In 1929, it was the site of an attempted assassination of Crown Prince Umberto of Italy by Fernando de Rosa.

Severely degraded by time, the Congress Column was cleaned for the first time since its erection in 1968. Between 1997 and 2008, the monument was again the subject of major renovation works divided into different phases. In 2001, the plinth and the four corner bronze statues were deep cleaned using laser cleaning technology. The corner statues were then coated with wax. In July 2002, work began on cleaning and restoring the column itself, again using the laser technique. The renovation works were completed in November 2002, allowing for the Armistice Day ceremonies to take place at the site.

== Description ==
The Congress Column has a total height of 47 m (154 ft). A spiral staircase of 193 steps inside the column leads to a platform, decorated with a lavishly carved balustrade, surrounding the pedestal of the 4.7-metre-tall (15 ft) statue of King Leopold I. The platform can accommodate 16 visitors, but is no longer accessible for security reasons. The statue of Leopold was made by the sculptor Guillaume Geefs.

Designed by Poelaert and inspired by Trajan's Column in Rome, the column commemorates the National Congress of 1830–31, which drafted the liberal Belgian Constitution of 1831. Important dates in the struggle for Belgian independence are engraved on column's pedestal, together with the names of the members of the National Congress and the Provisional Government of Belgium, as well as important passages from the Constitution. The frieze is decorated with elegant foliage and on its four sides are represented Wisdom, Strength, Immortality and Glory.

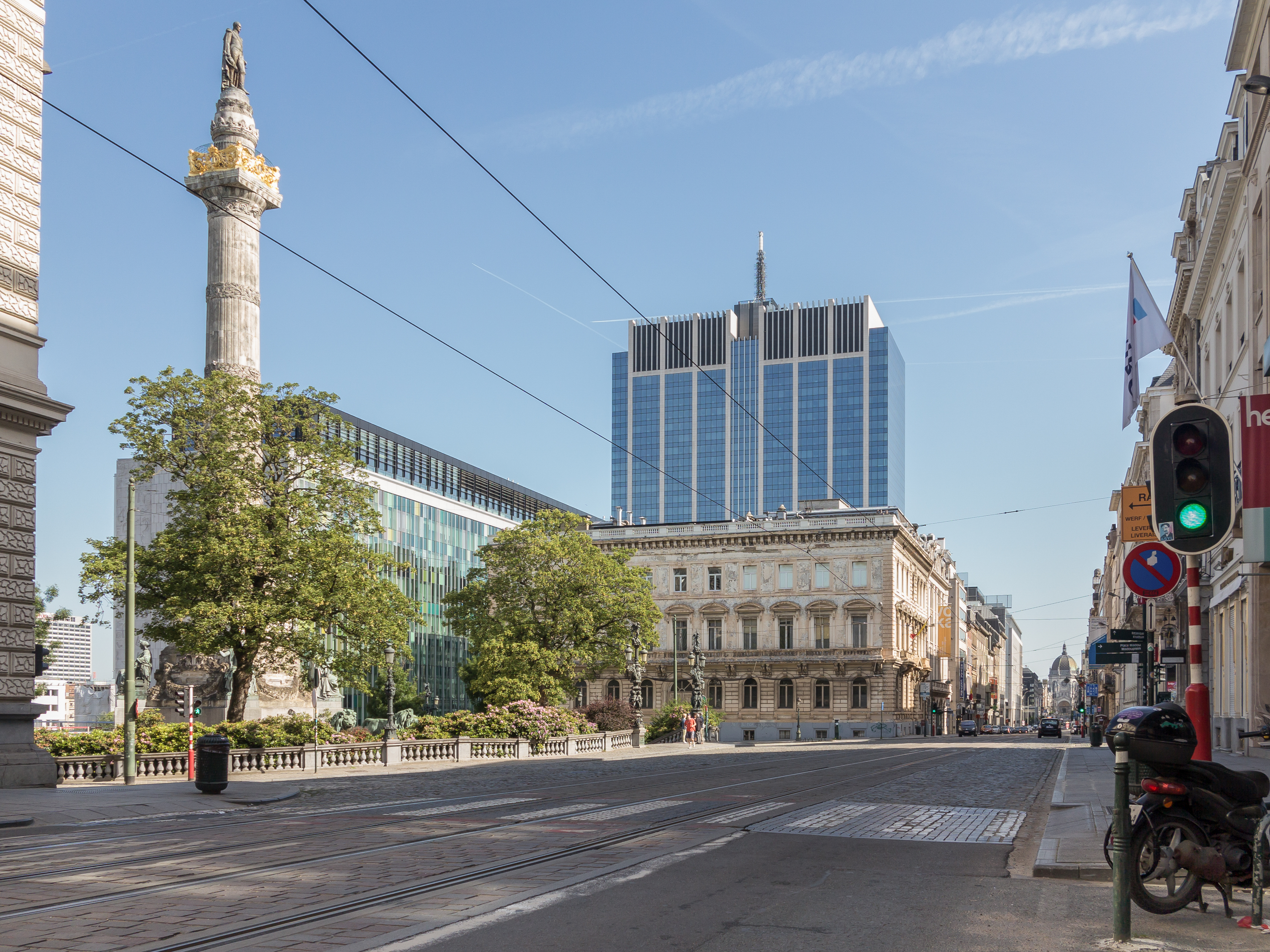
The Congress Column and the Finance Tower seen from the Rue Royale/Koningsstraat

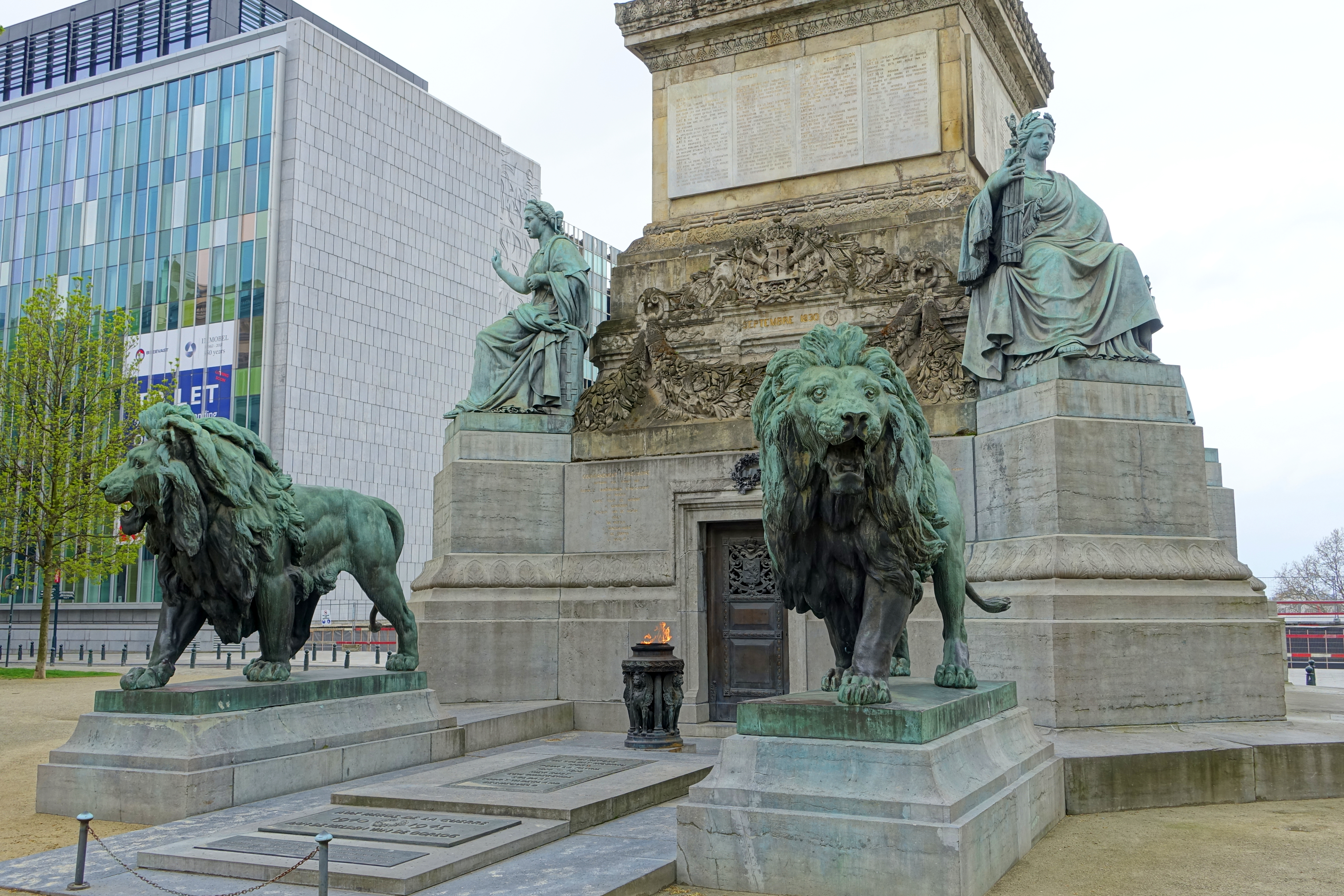
Pedestal of the column, with two bronze lions by Eugène Simonis

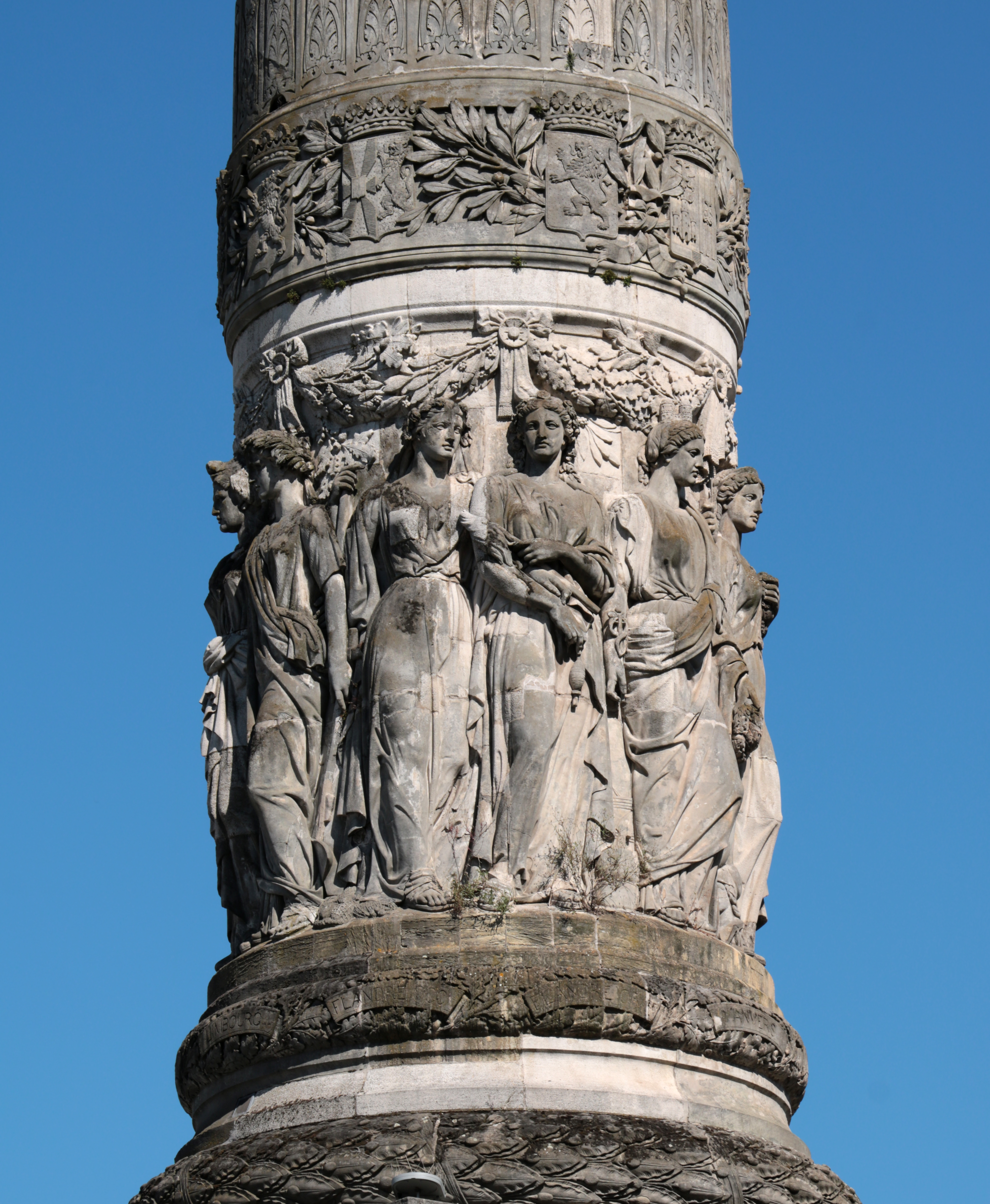
Detail of the frieze on the column

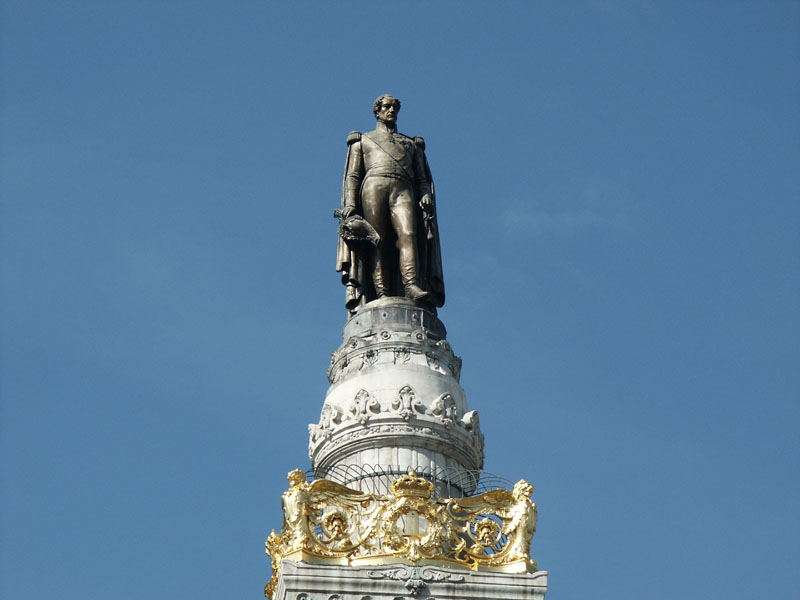
Statue of King Leopold I, by Guillaume Geefs, at the top of the column

At the base of the column, surrounding the pedestal, four sitting allegorical bronze female sculptures represent the major constitutional liberties enshrined in the Constitution of 1831: the Freedom of Association by Charles-Auguste Fraikin, the Freedom of Worship by Eugène Simonis, the Freedom of the Press and the Freedom of Education both by Joseph Geefs. Two monumental bronze lions by Eugène Simonis are placed in front of the monument. In 2007, during Storm Kyrill, the Freedom of the Press sculpture was blown down and later restored.

Congress Column's 'Freedom' sculptures

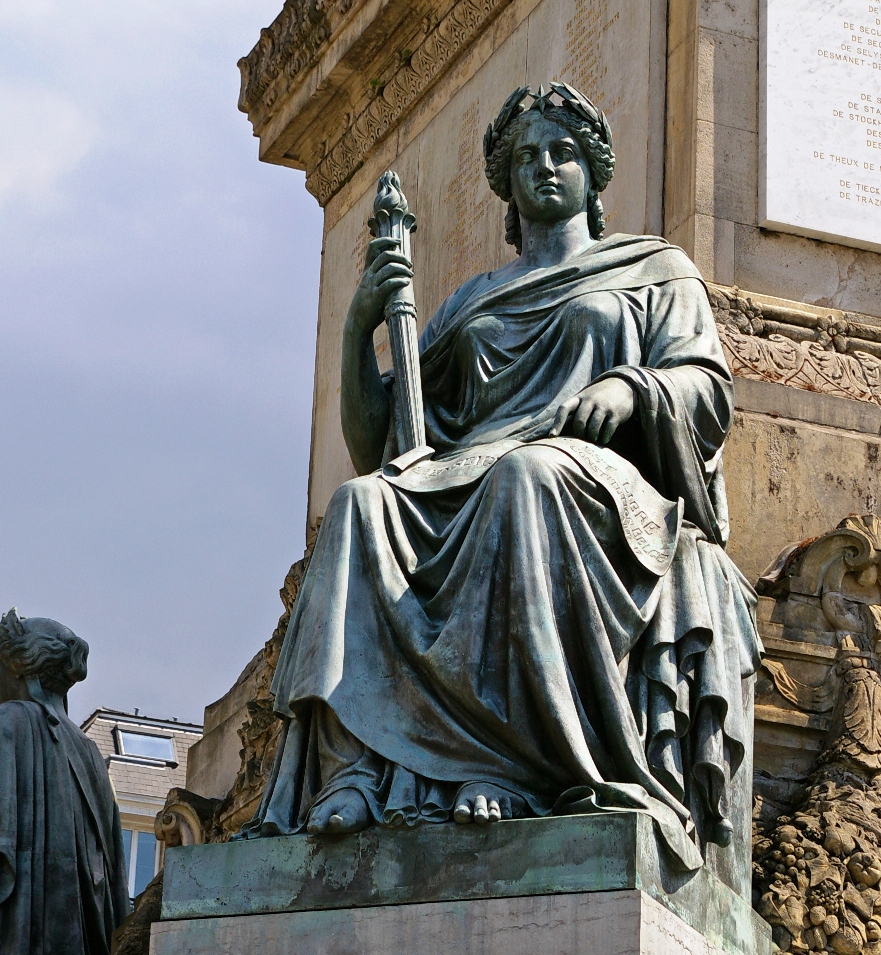
Liberté de l'enseignement ("Freedom of Education")

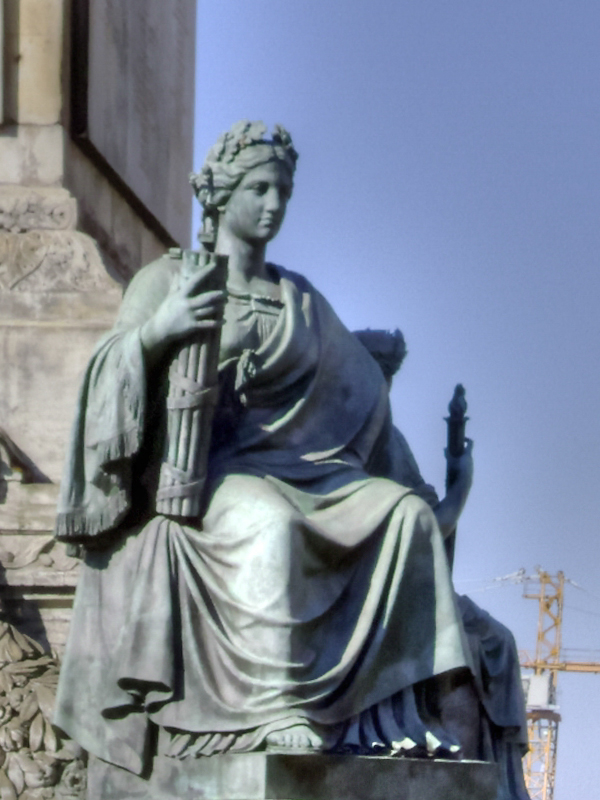
Liberté d'association ("Freedom of Association")

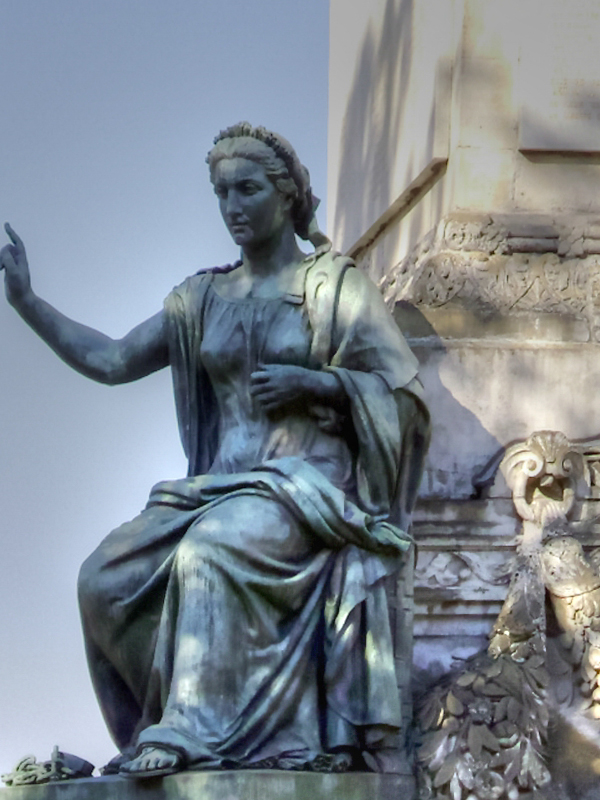
Liberté de culte ("Freedom of Worship")

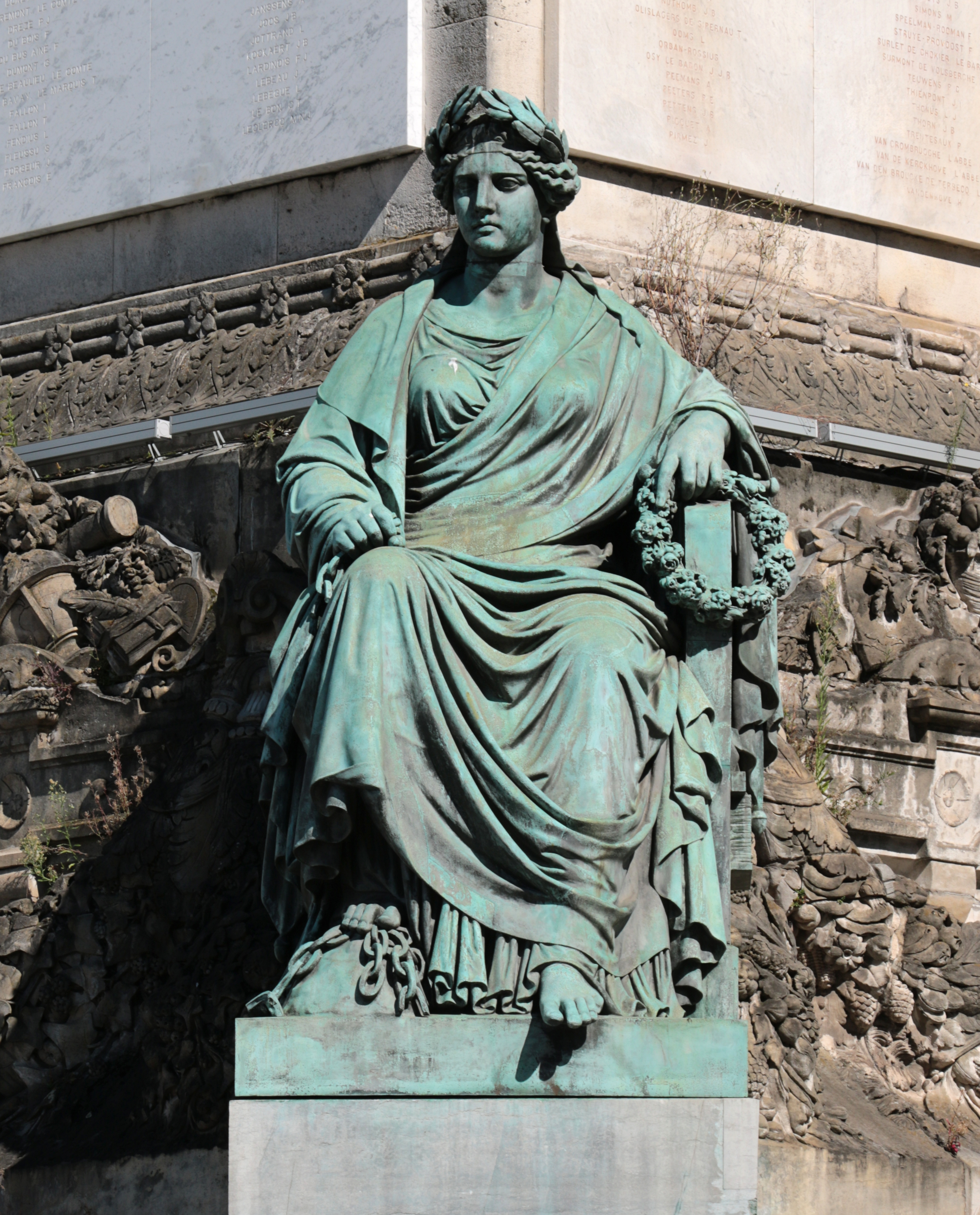
Liberté de la Presse ("Freedom of the Press")

== Monument to the Unknown Soldier ==
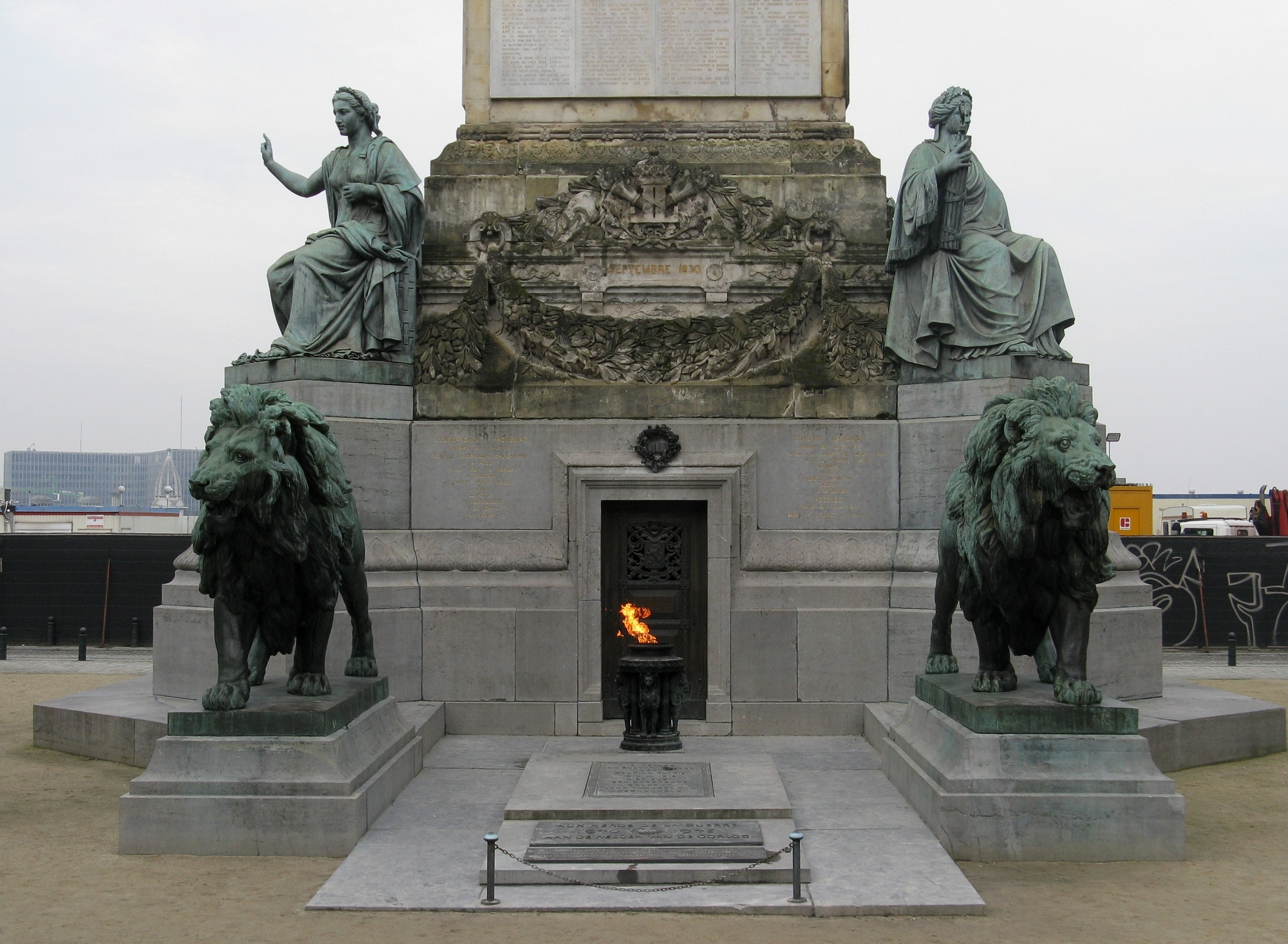
Tomb of the Unknown Soldier at the foot of the column

As a memorial to the Belgian victims of World War I, an unknown soldier was buried at the foot of the monument on 11 November 1922. This unknown soldier was selected out of five unidentified soldiers from different battle sites by Raymond Haesebrouck, a veteran blinded in battle. The tomb is surmounted by an eternal flame.

In December 1922, the unknown soldier was awarded the American Medal of Honor by a special act of the US Congress.

After World War II, a second memorial plaque was added to the monument to honour the Belgian victims of that war. In 1998, a third memorial plaque was dedicated to the Belgian soldiers killed while serving in peacekeeping missions since 1945.

== See also ==
- Neoclassical architecture in Belgium
- Sculpture in Brussels
- History of Brussels
- Culture of Belgium
- Belgium in the long nineteenth century
