= Dillen =

Dillen is a Dutch surname, and is a variant of the Breton word Dillon and means faithful. Notable people with the surname include:

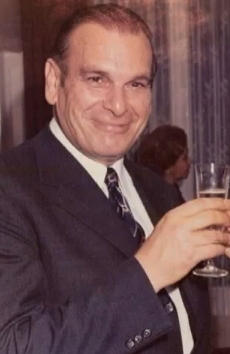
Cor Dillen

- Coen Dillen (1926–1990), Dutch footballer
- Cor Dillen (1920–2009), Dutch businessman, former billionaire Philips CEO
- Jacques Dillen (1903–?), Belgian wrestler
- Karel Dillen (1925–2007), Belgian politician
- Ken Dillen (1938–2020), Canadian politician
- René Dillen (born 1951), Belgian racing cyclist

== See also ==
- Dillens
