= Cirque Royal =

Entertainment venue in Brussels, Belgium

Cirque Royal / Koninklijk Circus
- Cirque Royal (French); Koninklijk Circus (Dutch)

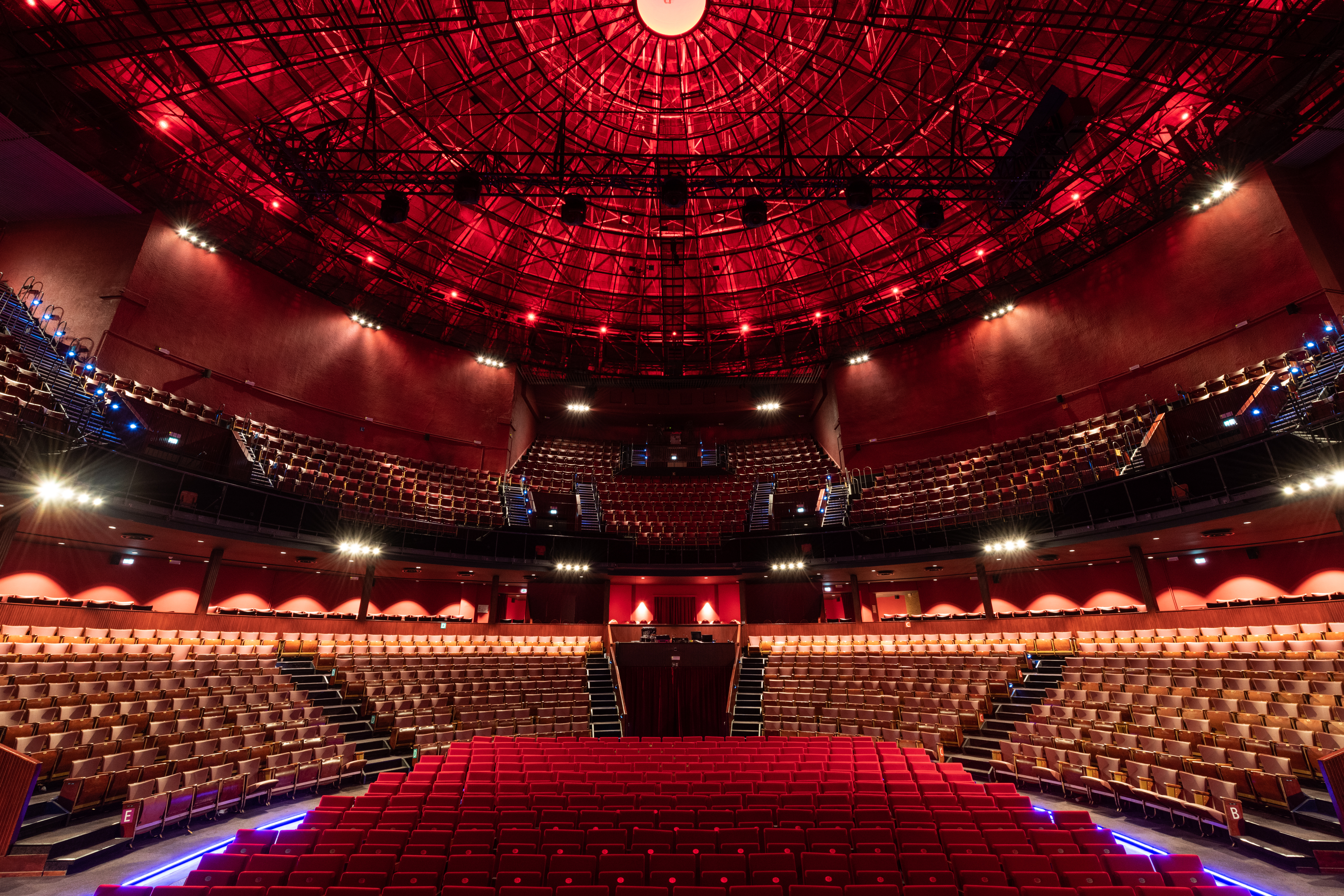
- View from the stage
- Interactive map of Cirque Royal / Koninklijk Circus
- Address: Rue de l'Enseignement / Onderrichtsstraat 81; 1000 City of Brussels, Brussels-Capital Region; Belgium
- Coordinates: 50°50′56″N 4°21′58″E
- Owner: City of Brussels
- Capacity: 2,000
- Type: Performing arts centre

Construction
- Opened: 1878
- Renovated: 1953, 2018

Website
- cirque-royal-bruxelles.be

The Cirque Royal (French) or Koninklijk Circus (Dutch), meaning "Royal Circus", is an entertainment venue in Brussels, Belgium. Conceived by the architect Wilhelm Kuhnen in 1953, the building has a circular appearance, but in fact is constructed as a regular polygon. It can hold 2,000 spectators, and nowadays is primarily used for live music shows.

== History ==
=== First Cirque Royal (1878–1953) ===
The Cirque Royal was created by the eponymous joint-stock company when the Freedom Quarter was built from 1876 onwards. The architect Wilhelm Khunen designed a building in the shape of a regular polygon on the available plot within the block. The Indian-style hall was rhymed by twenty columns that served as support for a roof truss that was hidden from the eyes of the spectators by a lowered ceiling in the form of a cashmere veil. It was festively opened in 1878 with a show by the Troupe équestre royale belge Renz. This only permanent circus in Brussels had stalls in the basement that could accommodate more than 110 horses. Water spectacles and equestrian shows alternated with pantomimes and ballets. Between 1908 and 1914, films were even shown in the hall.

On 29 and 30 July 1914, on the eve of the First World War, it was the setting for major anti-war meetings of the Bureau socialiste international contre la guerre, with in particular a triumphant speech by Jean Jaurès, the French socialist leader, two days before his assassination. After the war, it served for some time as a prison for German prisoners of war. From 1920, it reopened as a circus, and the director at the time reinstated the equestrian shows, supplemented by music hall revues and variety shows.

=== Second Cirque Royal (1953–present) ===
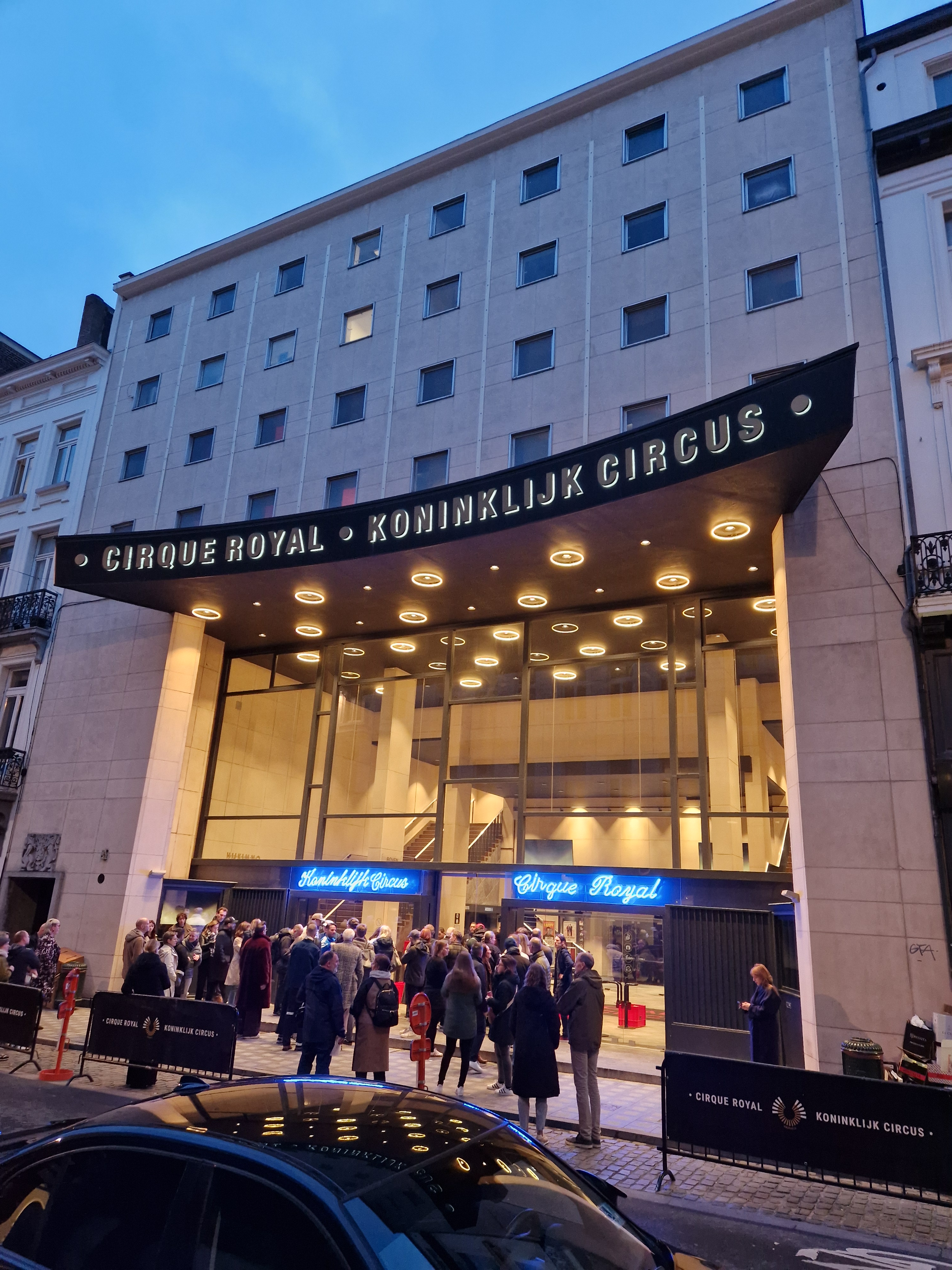
The Cirque Royal entrance in 2024

After the Second World War, the building stood empty for some time. In 1953, the architect Charles Van Nueten replaced the existing Cirque Royal with a new complex, this time in a contemporary style. It aimed to give the enlarged hall a multifunctional vocation so as to be able to extend the season throughout the year. Of the old building, only the foundations and the exterior framework reinforced by metal beams were kept.

From 1999 to June 2017, the concert agenda was managed by the cultural centre and music venue of the French Community of Belgium, Le Botanique. This very popular spot of Brussels cultural life, owned by the City of Brussels, underwent a major restoration in 2018. A new team was assembled to manage this event venue.

== Notable performances ==
Since its inception, the Cirque Royal has not only hosted countless horse shows and circus displays (e.g. Moscow Circus, Bouglione, Holiday on Ice and others), but has also hosted famous artists such as the violinists Eugène Ysaÿe and Yéhudi Menuhin, the singers Maurice Chevalier, Joséphine Baker, Mistinguette, Charles Trenet, Dalida, Buster Keaton, Gilbert Bécaud, the clown Popov, the trumpeter Louis Armstrong, the choreographer Maurice Béjart and the Ballet of the 20th Century.

In recent years, it has hosted a variety of stand-ups, dance shows and concerts by artists from all over the world, from Pascal Obispo to Kylie Minogue, and from The Beach Boys to Vanessa Paradis.

== See also ==
- List of concert halls
- History of Brussels
- Culture of Belgium
- Belgium in the long nineteenth century
