= Adolf Alexander Dillens =

Belgian painter

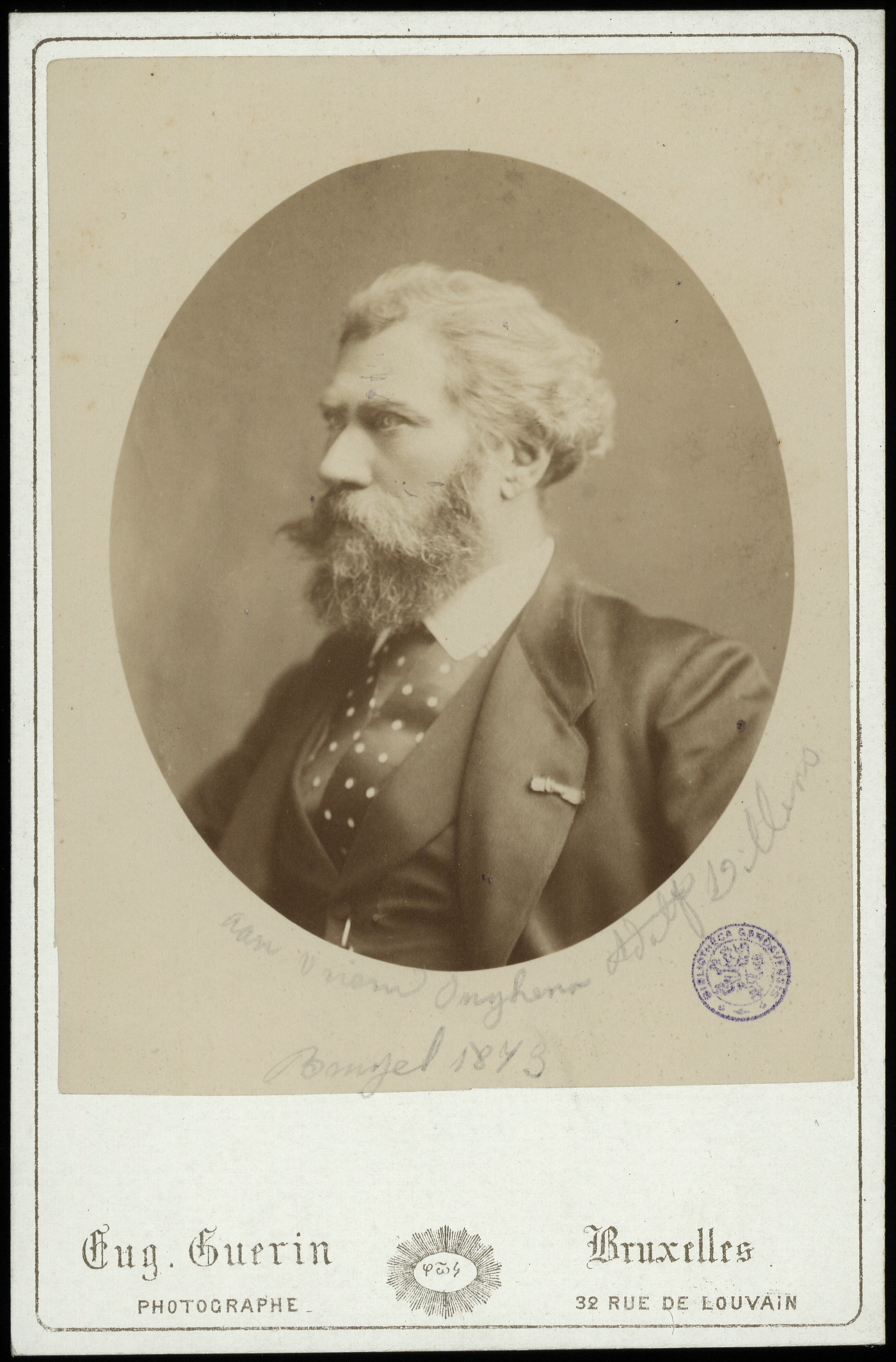
- Born: c. 1821; Ghent, United Kingdom of the Netherlands
- Died: c. 1877 n/a
- Occupation: Painter
- Relatives: Hendrik Dillens (brother)

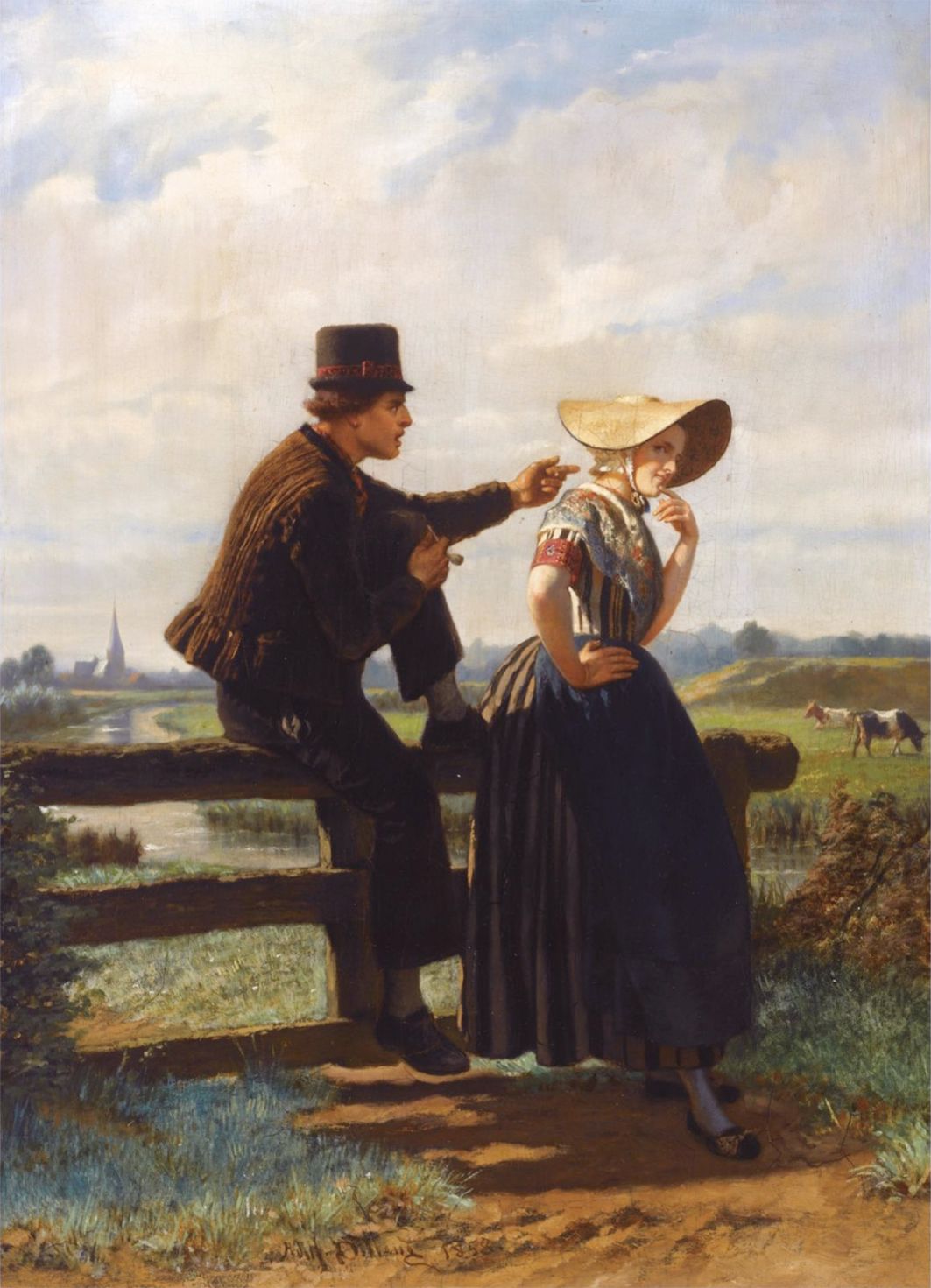
The Flirtation, 1858

Adolf Alexander Dillens, a Belgian genre-painter, was born at Ghent in 1821, and received instruction from his elder brother Hendrik Dillens. His first works were of an historical nature, but he afterwards devoted himself to pictures illustrating Zealand peasant life. He died in 1877. Amongst his best works are:

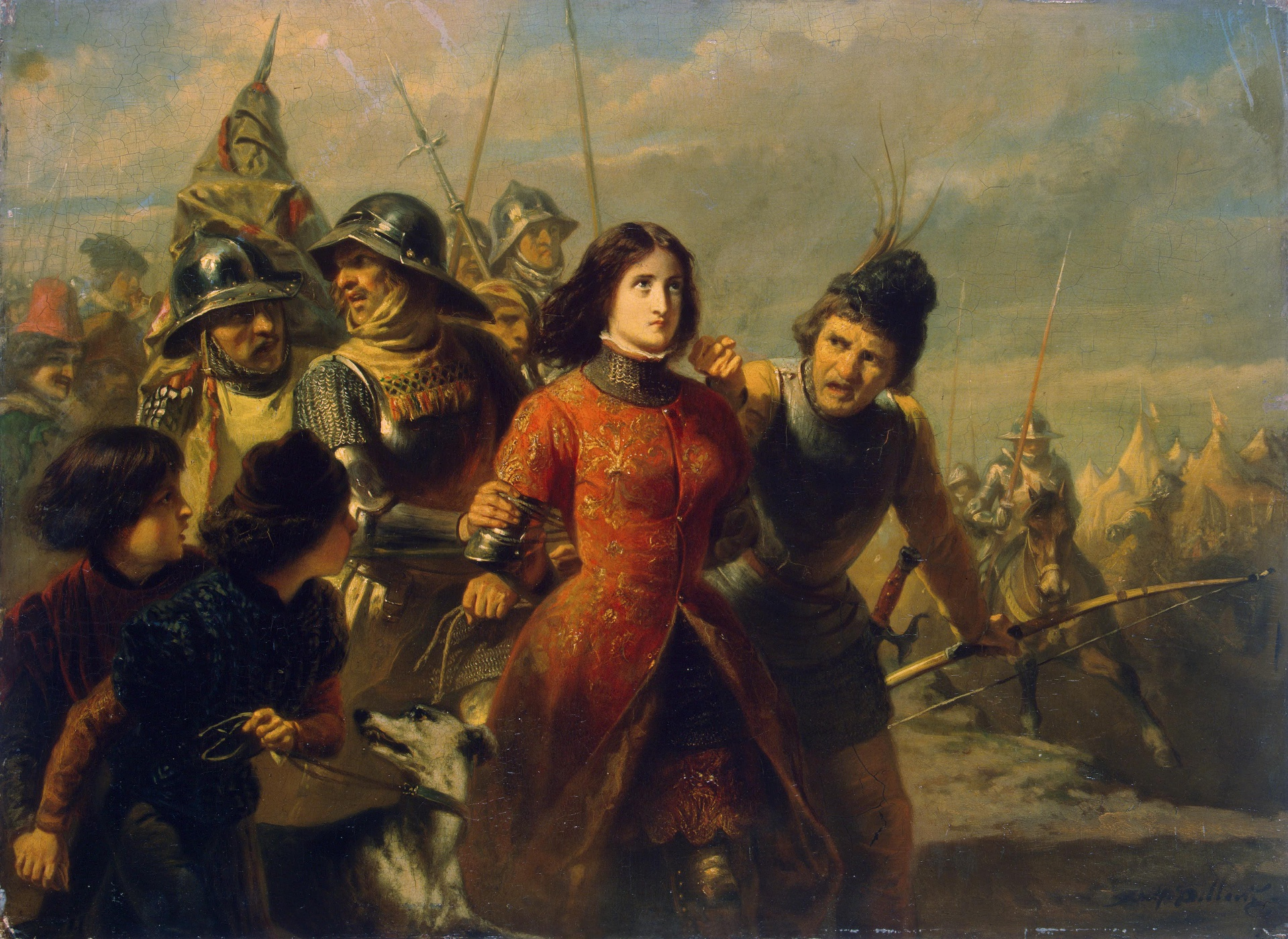
The Capture of Joan of Arc, ca. 1850, now in the Hermitage Museum in Saint Petersburg

- The Gossip at the Window.
- Taking Toll at the Bridge (of this picture he painted three versions).
- Asking in Marriage.
- A Fair at Westcapelle (at Paris International Exhibition, 1855).
- A Ball at Goes (at the same)
- The Juggler (at London International Exhibition, 1862).
- Skaters (in Brussels Museum).
- Recruiting: Austrian Soldiers halting at a Tavern (in the same).
