= Hippolyte Metdepenningen =

Belgian politician

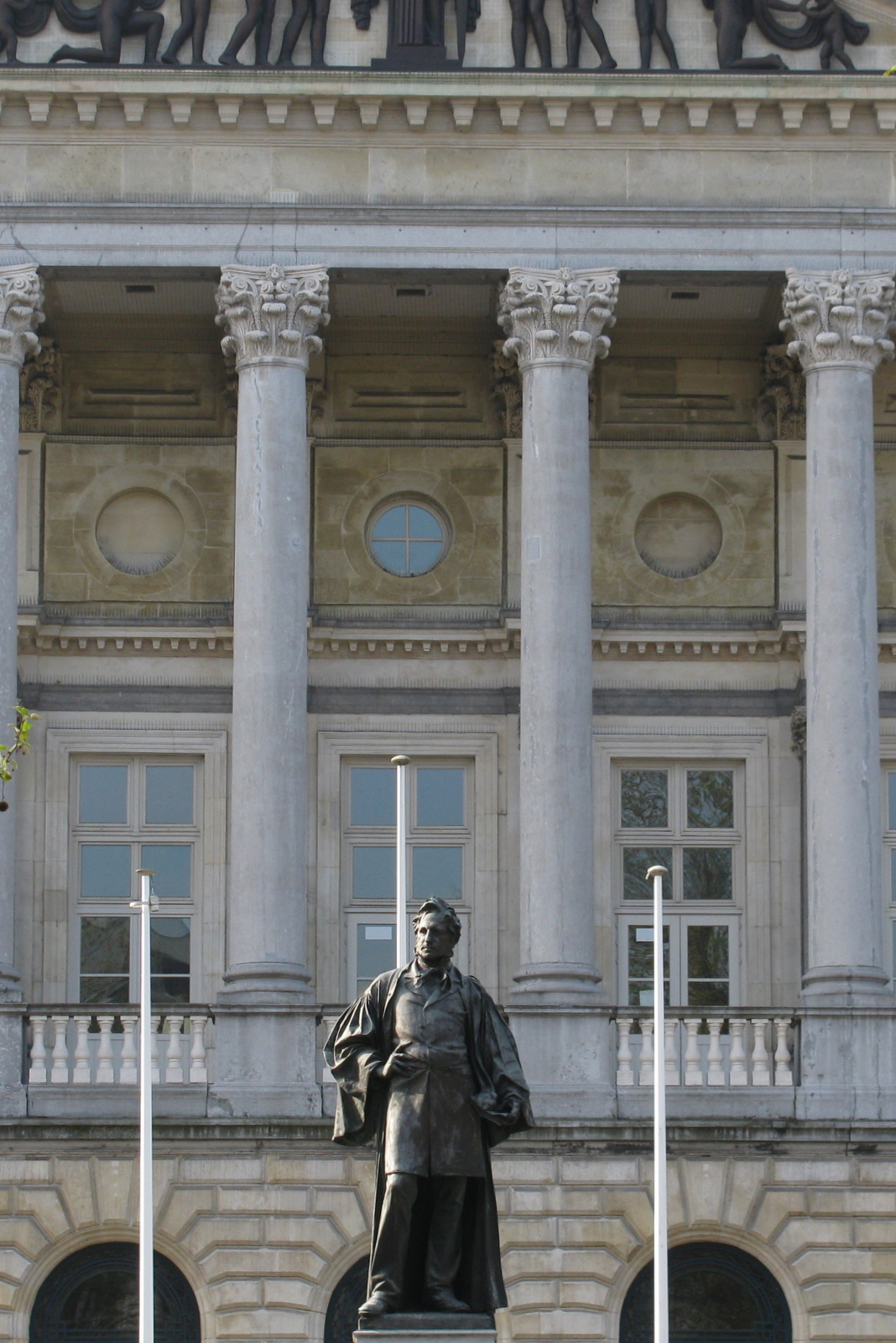
- Statue of Hippolyte Metdepenningen in front of the Court of Justice in Ghent
- Born: Hippolyte Désiré Metdepenningen; 31 March 1799; Ghent, French First Republic
- Died: 1881 (aged 81–82)
- Occupation: politician

Hippolyte Désiré Metdepenningen (1799–1881) was a Belgian lawyer, president of the Ghent Bar Association and a politician.

After Belgium became independent from the Netherlands in 1830 he became a municipal councilor on the Orangist list. In 1846 he was co-founder of the Liberal Party, which was the first political party of Belgium. In 1848 he retired from politics. For many years he was Worshipful Master of the Ghent lodge Le Septentrion. On 20 June 1886, a statue was inaugurated in front of the Court of Justice in Ghent by sculptor Julien Dillens.
