= Julien Dillens =

Belgian sculptor (1849–1904)

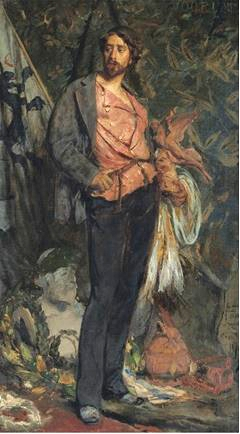
Julien Dillens, holding his Prix de Rome; portrait by Léon Herbo

Julien Dillens (8 June 1849 – 24 December 1904) was a Belgian sculptor born in Antwerp, the son of the painter Hendrick Joseph Dillens.

== Biography ==
Dillens studied under Eugène Simonis at the Académie Royale des Beaux-Arts. In 1877 he received the Prix de Rome for A Gaulish Chief taken Prisoner by the Romans. At Brussels, in 1881, he executed the groups entitled Justice and Herkenbald, the Brussels Brutus.

For the pediment of the orphanage at Uccle, Figure Kneeling (Brussels Gallery), and the statue of the lawyer Hippolyte Metdepenningen in front of the Palais de Justice at Ghent, he was awarded the medal of honor in 1889 at the Paris Universal Exhibition, where, in 1900, his Two Statues of the Anspach Monument gained him a similar distinction.

For the town of Brussels he executed The Four Continents (Maison du Renard, Grand, Place), The Lansquenets crowning the lucarnes of the Maison de Roi, and the Monument at Everard 't Serclaes under the arcades of the Maison de l'Etoile, and, for the Belgian government, Flemish Art, German Art, Classic Art and Art applied to Industry (all in the Centre for Fine Arts, Brussels), The Laurel at the Botanical Garden of Brussels, and the statue of Bernard van Orley (Petit Sablon Square, Brussels).

Additional works produced by Dillens include An Enigma (1876), the bronze busts of Rogier de la Pasture and P. P. Rubens (1879), Etruria (1880), The Painter Leon Frederic (1888), Madame Léon Herbo, Hermes, a scheme of decoration for the ogival façade of the hotel de ville at Ghent (1893), The Genius of the Funeral Monument of the Moselli Family, The Silence of Death (for the entrance of the cemetery of St Gilles), two caryatids for the town hall of St Gilles, presentation plaquette to Dr Heger, medals of MM. Godefroid and Vanderkindere and of The Three Burgomasters of Brussels, and the ivories Allegretto, Minerva and the Jamaer Memorial.

Dillens died in Brussels on 24 December 1904.

== Selected works ==
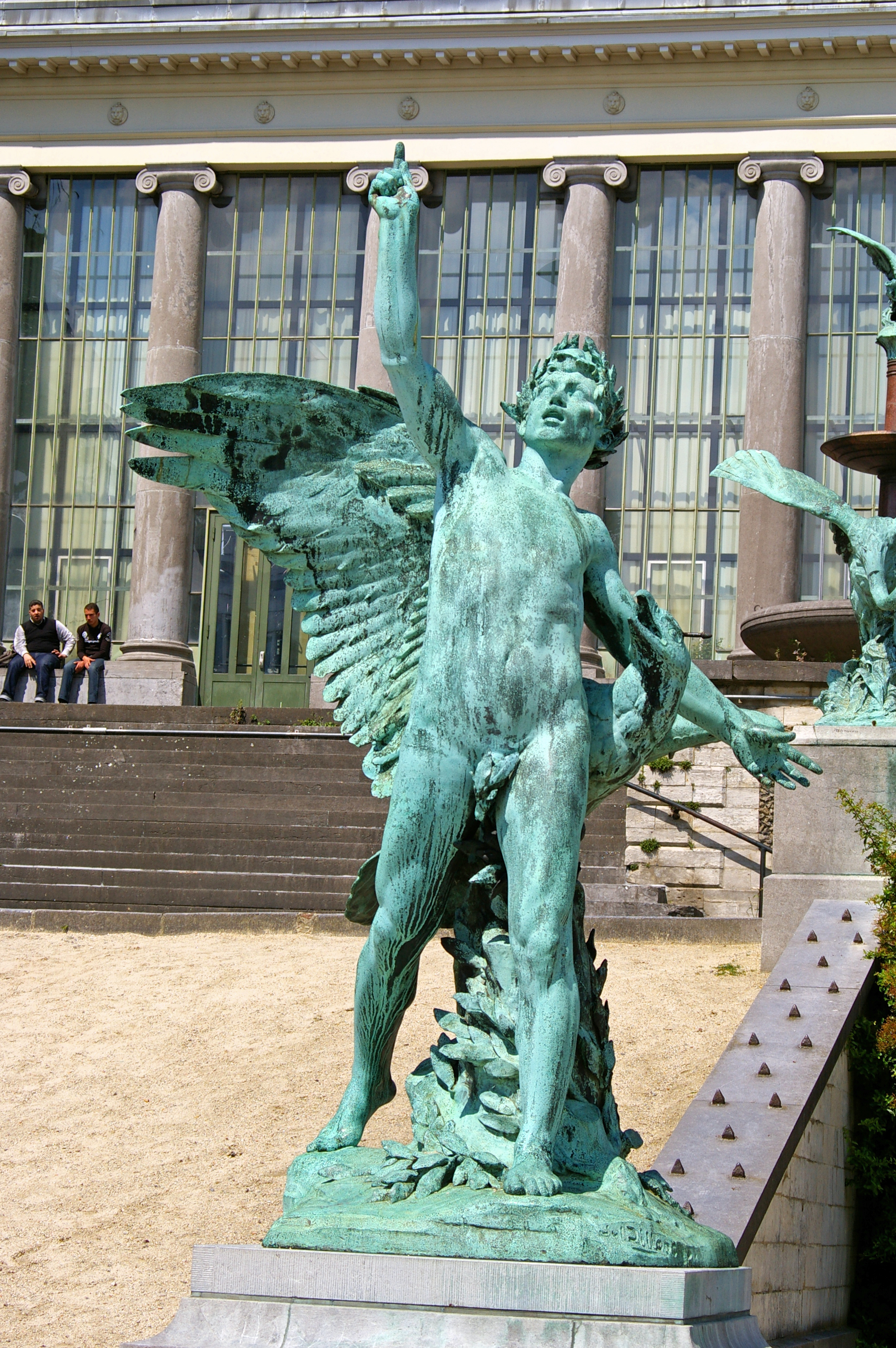
Le Laurier, Botanical Garden of Brussels

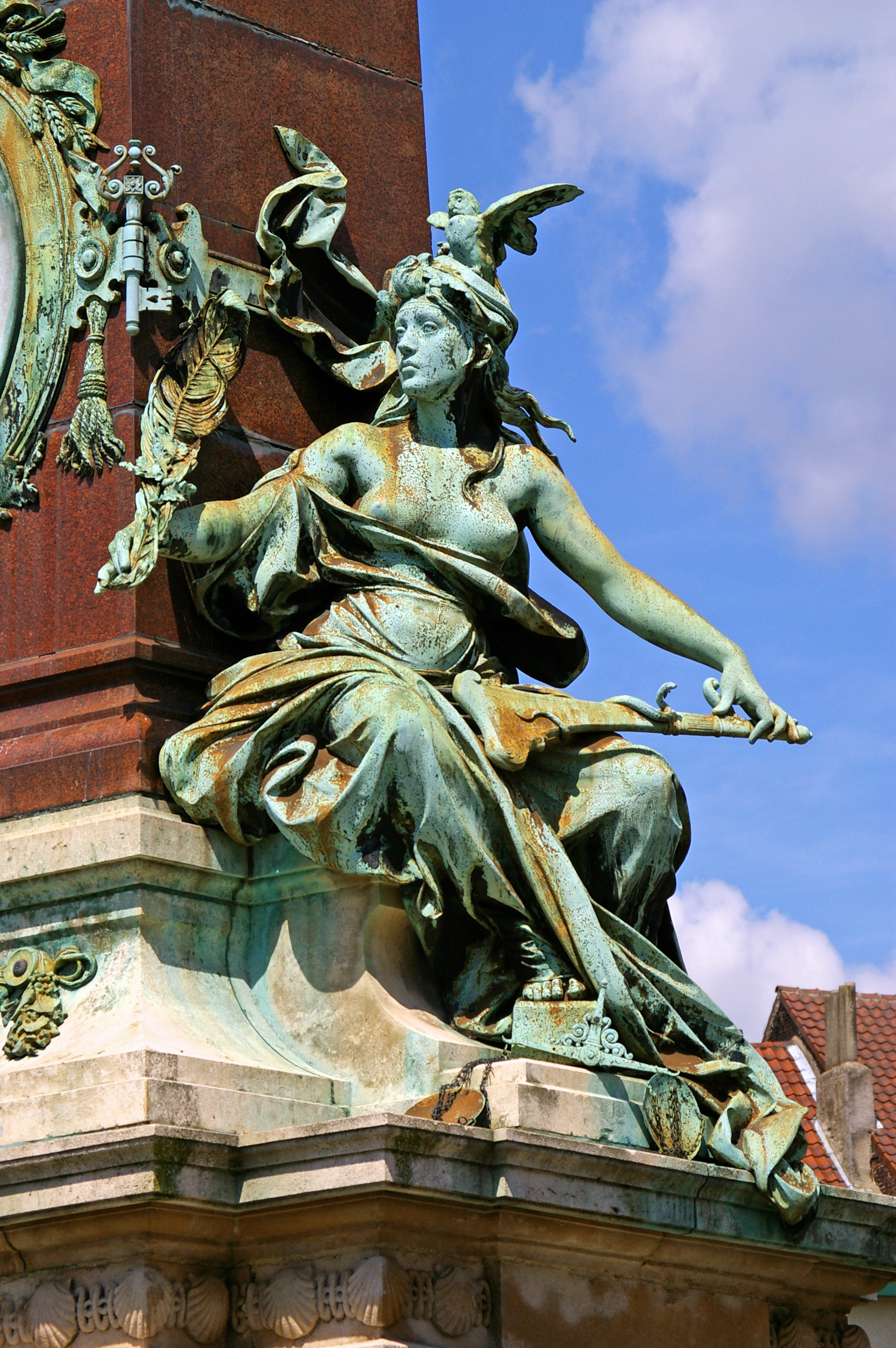
Magistrature Communale, Anspach Fountain, Brussels

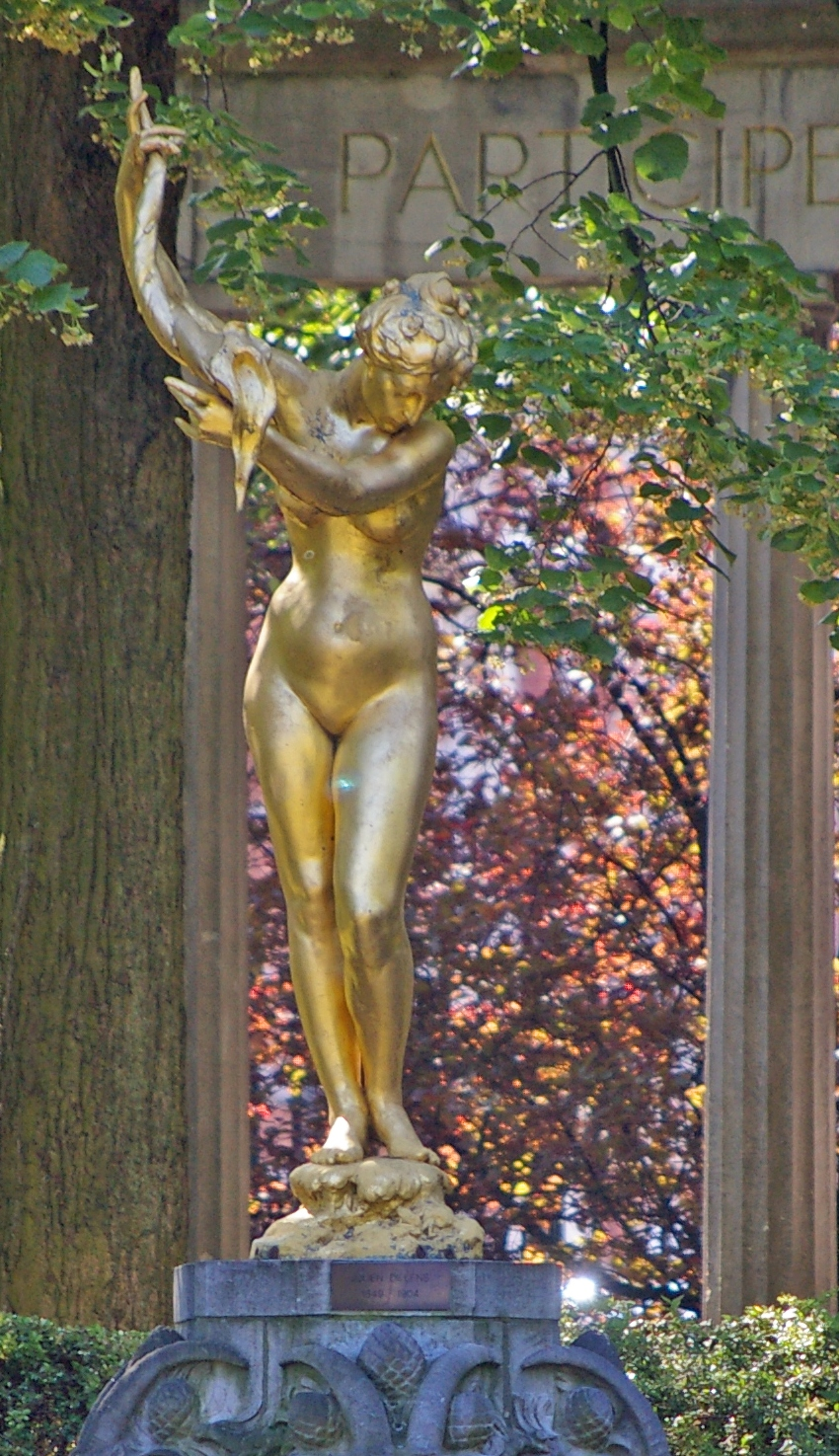
La Source, Saint-Josse-ten-Noode, Square Armand Steurs

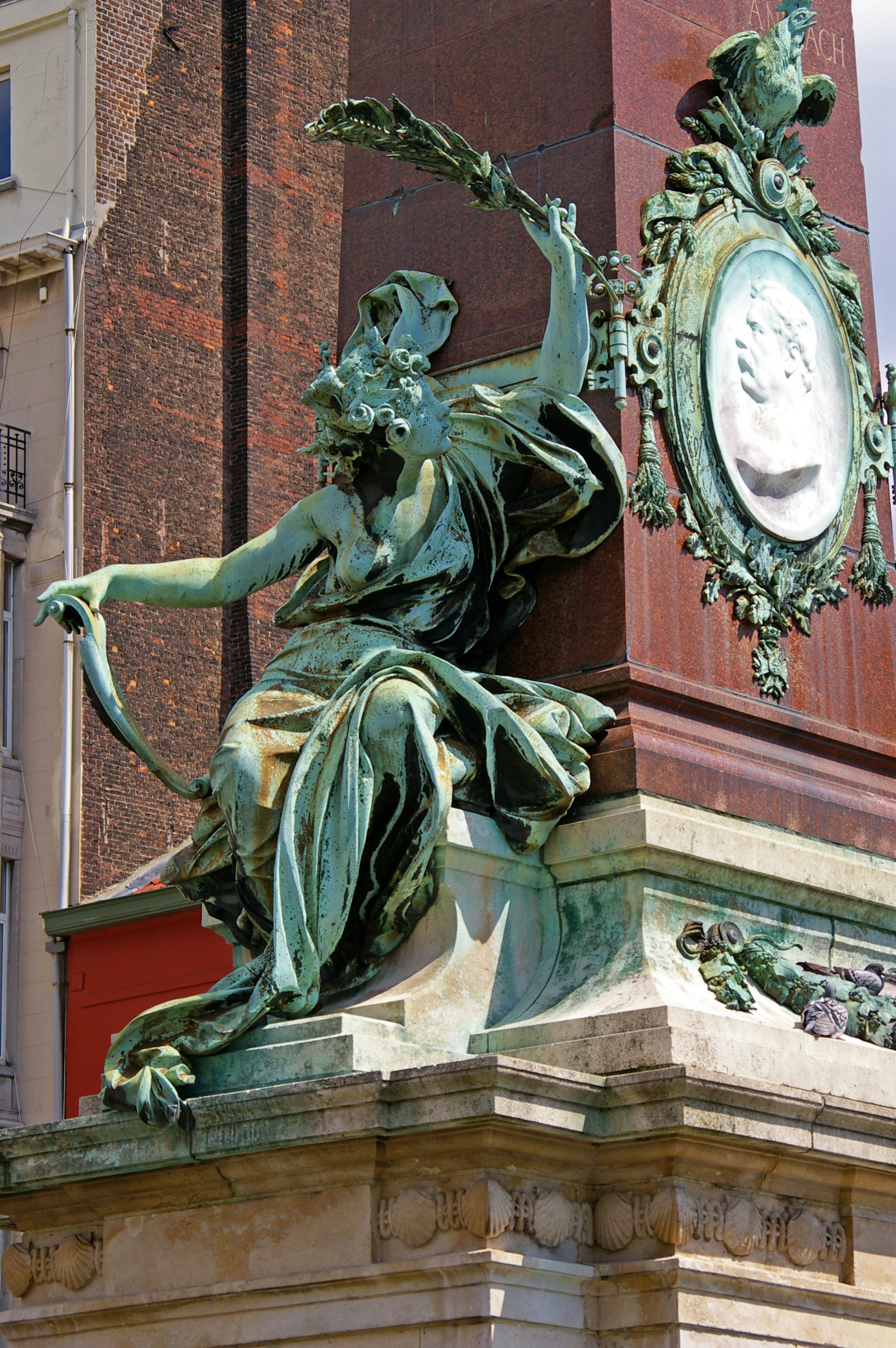
Bruxelles, Anspach Fountain

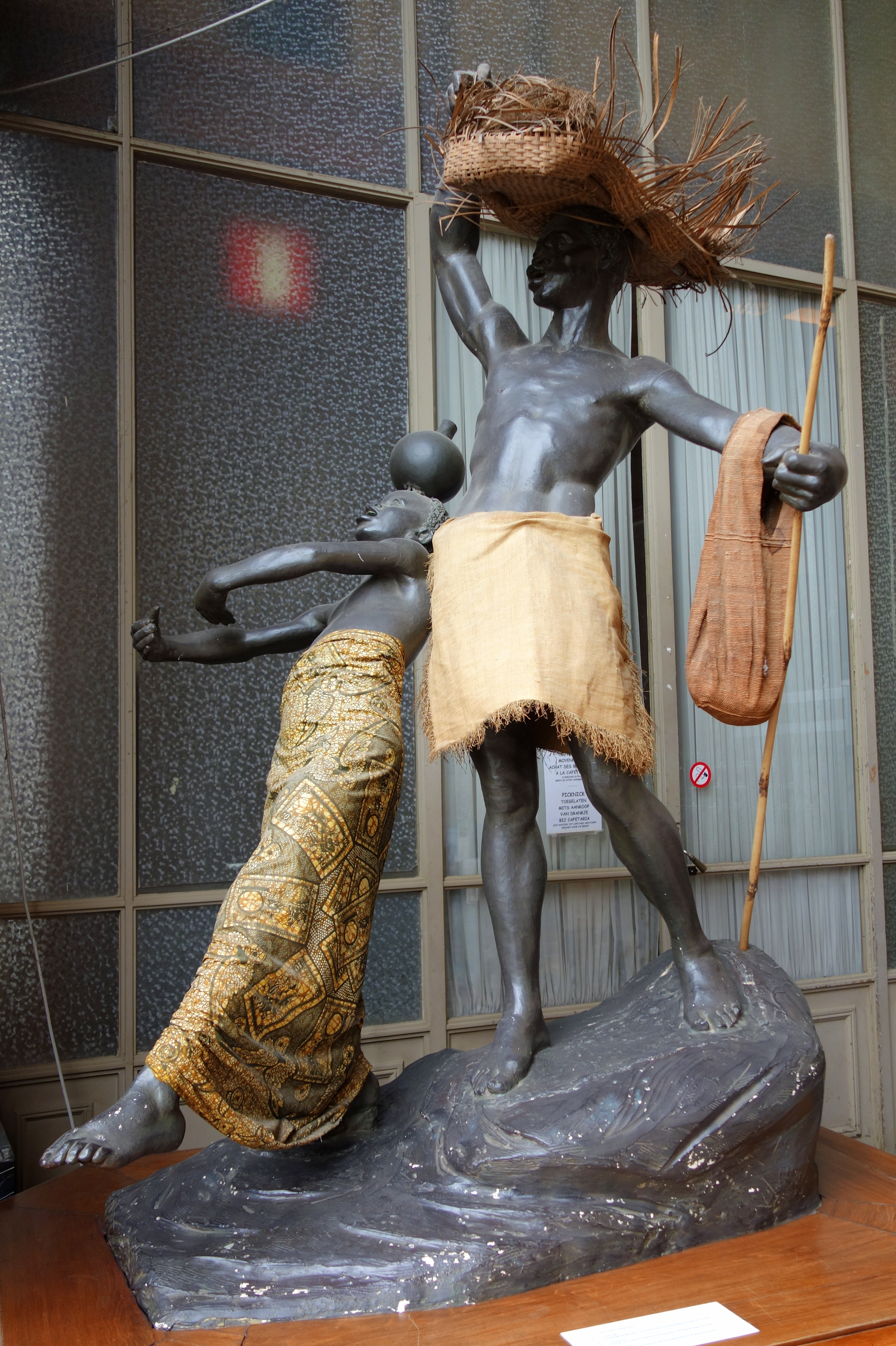
The Porters, Royal Museum for Central Africa

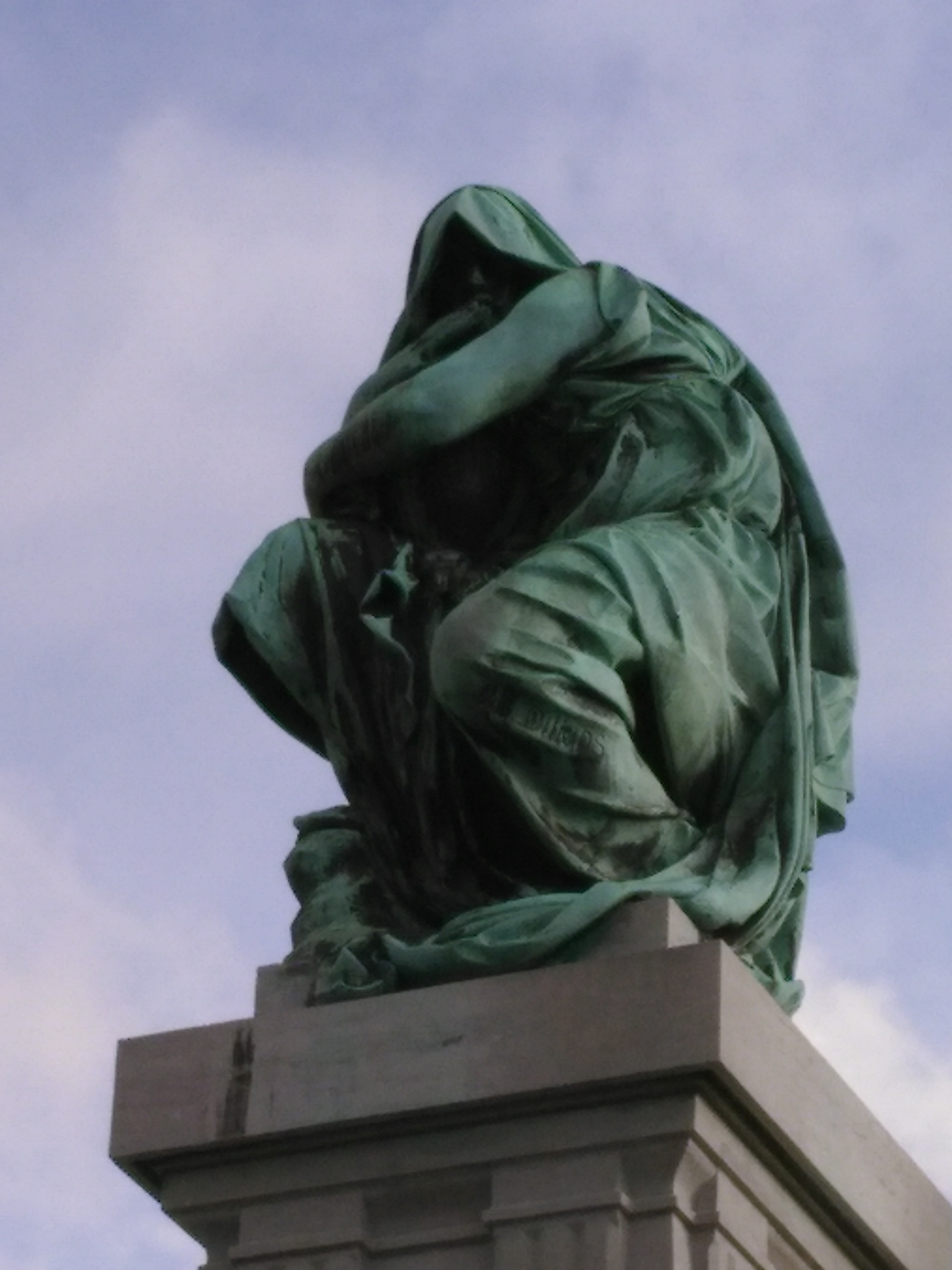
The Silence of the Tomb, Cemetery of Saint-Gilles
