= Freedom Quarter =

Neighbourhood in Brussels, Belgium

Freedom Quarter: Quartier des Libertés (French); Vrijheidswijk (Dutch); Notre-Dame-aux-Neiges (French); Onze-Lieve-Vrouw-ter-Sneeuw (Dutch)
- Neighbourhood
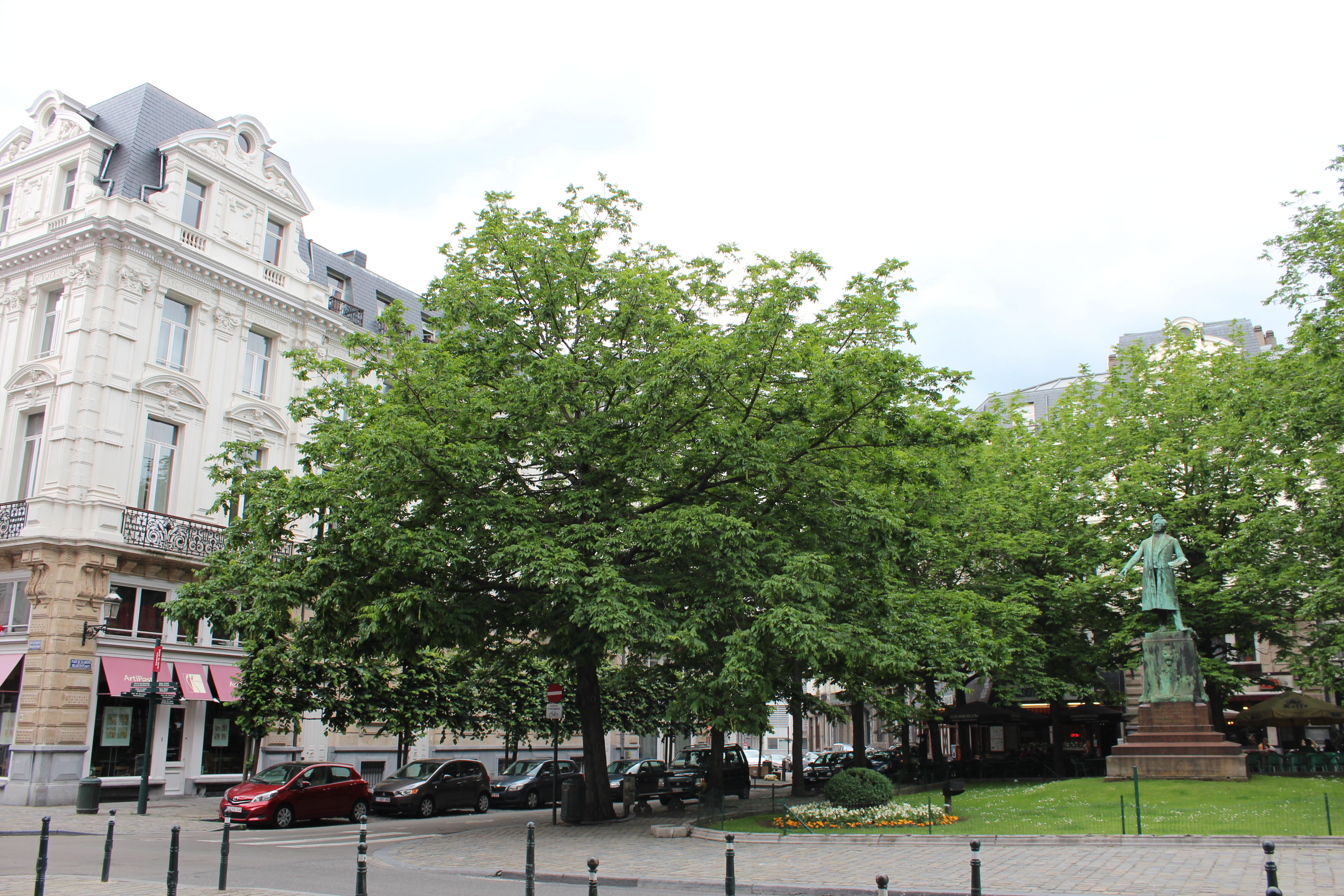
- Place de la Liberté/Vrijheidsplein

- Location within Brussels Freedom Quarter (Belgium)
- Coordinates: 50°50′59″N 4°22′00″E
- Country: Belgium
- Region: Brussels-Capital Region
- Arrondissement: Brussels-Capital
- Municipality: City of Brussels
- Time zone: UTC+1 (CET)
  - Summer (DST): UTC+2 (CEST)
- Postal code: 1000
- Area codes: 02

The Freedom Quarter (French: Quartier des Libertés, pronounced [kaʁtje de libɛʁte]; Dutch: Vrijheidswijk, pronounced [ˈvrɛiɦɛitsˌʋɛik]) is a quarter of Brussels, Belgium. It is situated between the Belgian Parliament and the Rue Royale/Koningsstraat, not far from the crossroads with the Small Ring (Brussels' inner ring road). Until the 19th century, it was known as Notre-Dame-aux-Neiges (French, pronounced [nɔtʁə dam o nɛʒ]) or Onze-Lieve-Vrouw-ter-Sneeuw (Dutch, pronounced [ˌɔnzə ˌlivə ˈvrʌu tɛr ˈsneːu]), both meaning "Our Lady of the Snows".

== History ==
=== Origins: "Our Lady of the Snows" ===
The district's old name, Notre-Dame-aux-Neiges/Onze-Lieve-Vrouw-ter-Sneeuw, meaning "Our Lady of the Snows", comes from a small chapel dating from 1627, located at the end of the Vieux Chemin de Schaerbeek/Ouden Scarenbeekschen Straet ("Old Schaerbeek Street"), outside the first city walls. It was dedicated to the Virgin Mary whose white mantle of snow was said to have indicated, in the 6th century, the place where the Basilica of Saint Mary Major was to be built in Rome.

The second walls, built in the 14th century, had indeed enclosed the area within their fortifications. Having become part of the city, it nevertheless remained largely rural. Religious and charitable institutions took advantage of its wide spaces and settled there from the 16th century onwards. It was also in this somewhat remote area, not far from the new ramparts, that plague victims were buried, and in 1555, the sick were isolated in Pesthuysens ("Pest houses"). Following Emperor Joseph II's policy of abolishing convents deemed useless, and the French Revolution, these religious institutions were dismantled and their property reused. As for the Notre-Dame-aux-Neiges chapel, it was demolished in 1796.

=== 19th-century transformations ===
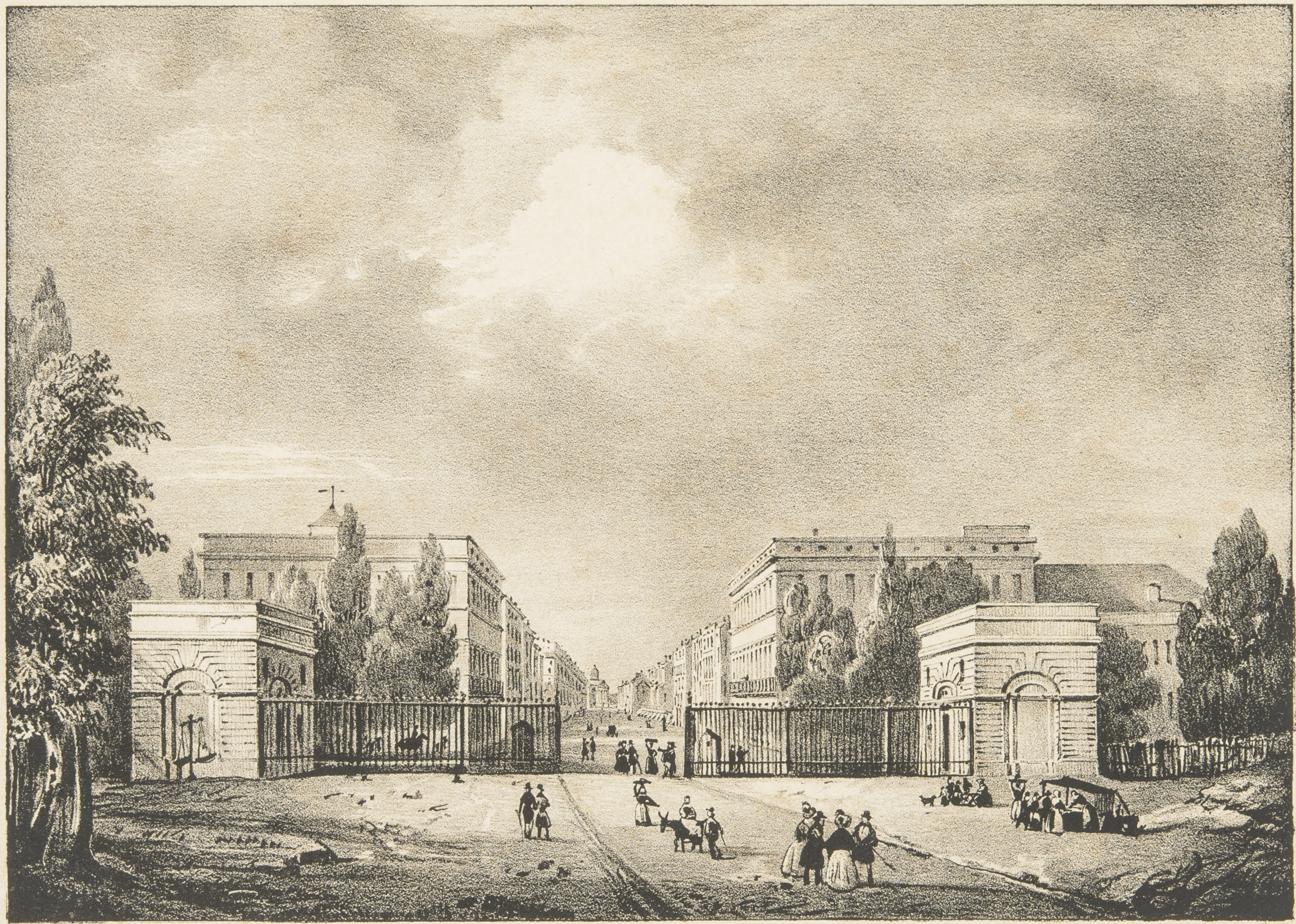
Schaerbeek Gate, view towards the Rue Royale/Koningsstraat, c. 1830s

By the 19th century, the area had become a predominantly working-class district, with many narrow streets and dead-ends. Despite the construction of the Congress Column in 1850–1859, and other developments, such as the creation of the Place d'Orange/Oranjeplein (today's Place des Barricades/Barricadenplein), and the extension of the Rue Royale/Koningsstraat, the area remained riddled with unsanitary and overcrowded buildings. The authorities' desire to clean up the squalid parts of the city led to the expulsion of the population and the neighbourhood's complete destruction.

A new bourgeois district was developed during the last quarter of the century. The choice was made to commemorate Belgian independence: the Place de la Liberté/Vrijheidsplein ("Liberty Square"), the Place des Barricades/Barricadenplein ("Barricades' Square"), the Rue de la Révolution/Revolutiestraat ("Revolution Street"), the Rue du Congrès/Congresstraat ("Congress Street"), etc. The four streets leading off the Place de la Liberté bear the names of the four constitutional liberties, symbolised by four allegorical bronze female sculptures surrounding the Congress Column: Freedom of the Press, Worship, Association and Education. Concurrently, the district acquired prestigious infrastructure: the Royal Baths, the Cirque Royal/Koninklijk Circus, the Eden Theatre and the Parliament Gallery.

=== 20th century and later ===
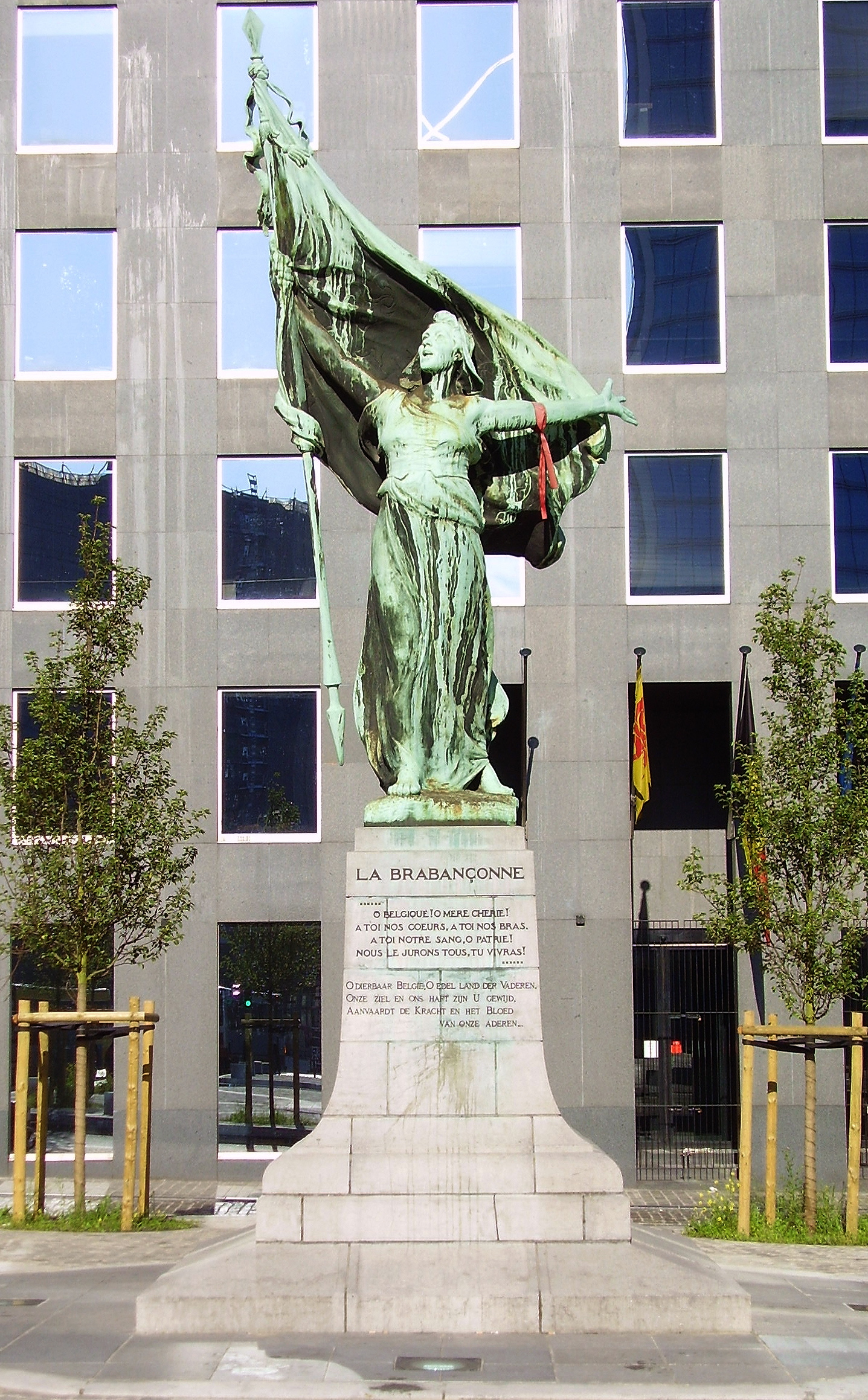
The Brabançonne on the Place Surlet de Chokier/Surlet de Chokierplein

The 20th century marked the district's final transformation with the arrival of the tertiary sector: offices were established, reducing the proportion of housing. The city neglected its heritage for much of the century, but a major renovation, beginning in 1985, breathed new life into the neighbourhood. Around the same time, cars were banned from one side of the Place de la Liberté, creating space for café terraces beneath the trees. In spite of the changes, this eclectic urban complex remains one of the best preserved in the Pentagon (Brussels' city centre).

== See also ==
- Neighbourhoods in Brussels
- Neoclassical architecture in Belgium
- History of Brussels
- Culture of Belgium
- Belgium in the long nineteenth century
