= Eugène Simonis =

Belgian sculptor

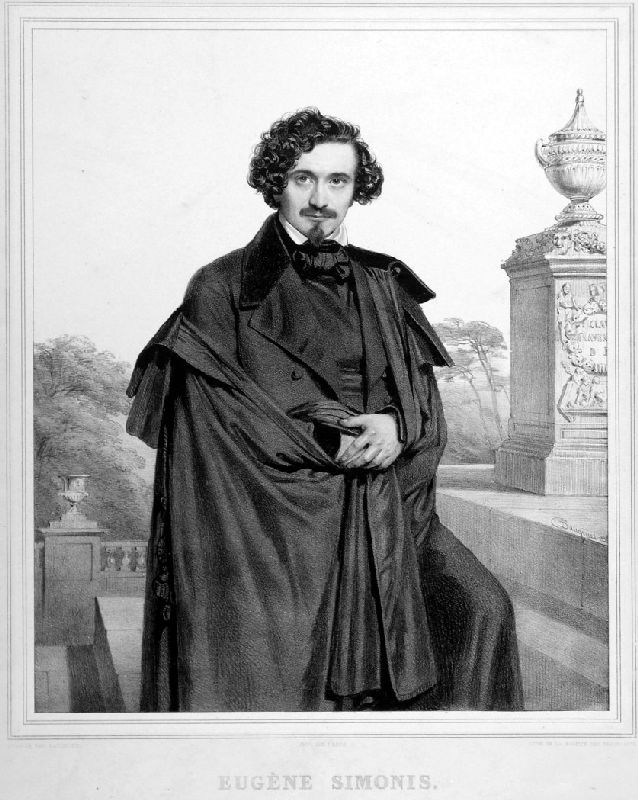
Eugène Simonis, lithograph by Charles Baugniet published in Les Artistes Contemporains (1836)

Louis-Eugène Simonis (French pronunciation: [lwi øʒɛn simɔnis]; 11 July 1810, in Liège – 11 July 1893, in Koekelberg) was a Belgian sculptor.

== Career ==
Simonis studied under François-Joseph Dewandre at the Academie Royale des Beaux-Arts in Liège and at the age of nineteen went to Italy, where he continued his studies in Bologna and Rome. When he returned to Belgium he accepted an instructor position at the Liege Academy. Later he moved to Brussels, where he became the director of the Académie Royale des Beaux-Arts. Among his many students were the Belgian sculptors Thomas Vinçotte, Julien Dillens, and Charles Samuel.

The square in Brussels, where Simonis had his studio, was given the name Eugène Simonis Square in his honor. A metro station in Brussels, completed in 1982, bears his name. In 2007, a bust of Simonis by Annie Jungers was unveiled at Simonis Square.

== Honours ==
- 1881: Grand Officer in the Order of Leopold.

== Selected works ==
- Bronze monument to Simon Stevin, Simon Stevinplein, Bruges, 1846
- Bronze monument to Godfrey of Bouillon, Place Royale/Koningsplein, Brussels, 1848
- Bas-relief The Harmony of Human Passions decorating the pediment of the Royal Theatre of La Monnaie, Brussels, 1851–1854
- Sculptures for the Congress Column, Brussels, including both lions and one (of four) sitting statue which represents the Freedom of Worship, 1859. (The statue of King Leopold I on top of the column was made by Guillaume Geefs.)
- Bronze bust of Walthère Frère-Orban, Liège, 1860
- Statue of Leopold I, Place Léopold I, in front of Mons railway station, 1875, moved in 2014 to the Rue Pierre-Joseph Duménil
- Bronze monument to André Dumont, Liège, 1886
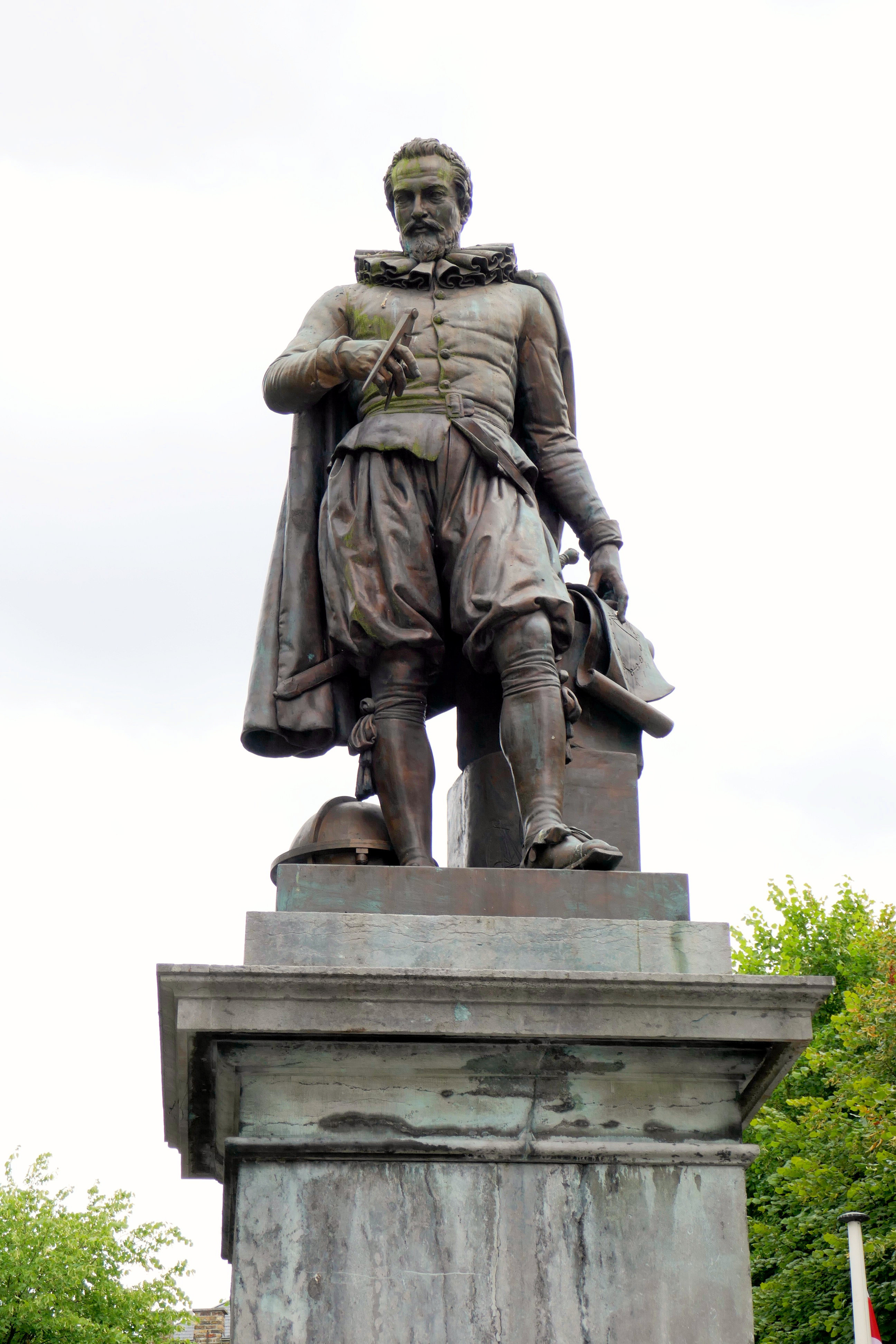
Monument to Simon Stevin, Simon Stevinplein, Bruges, 1846

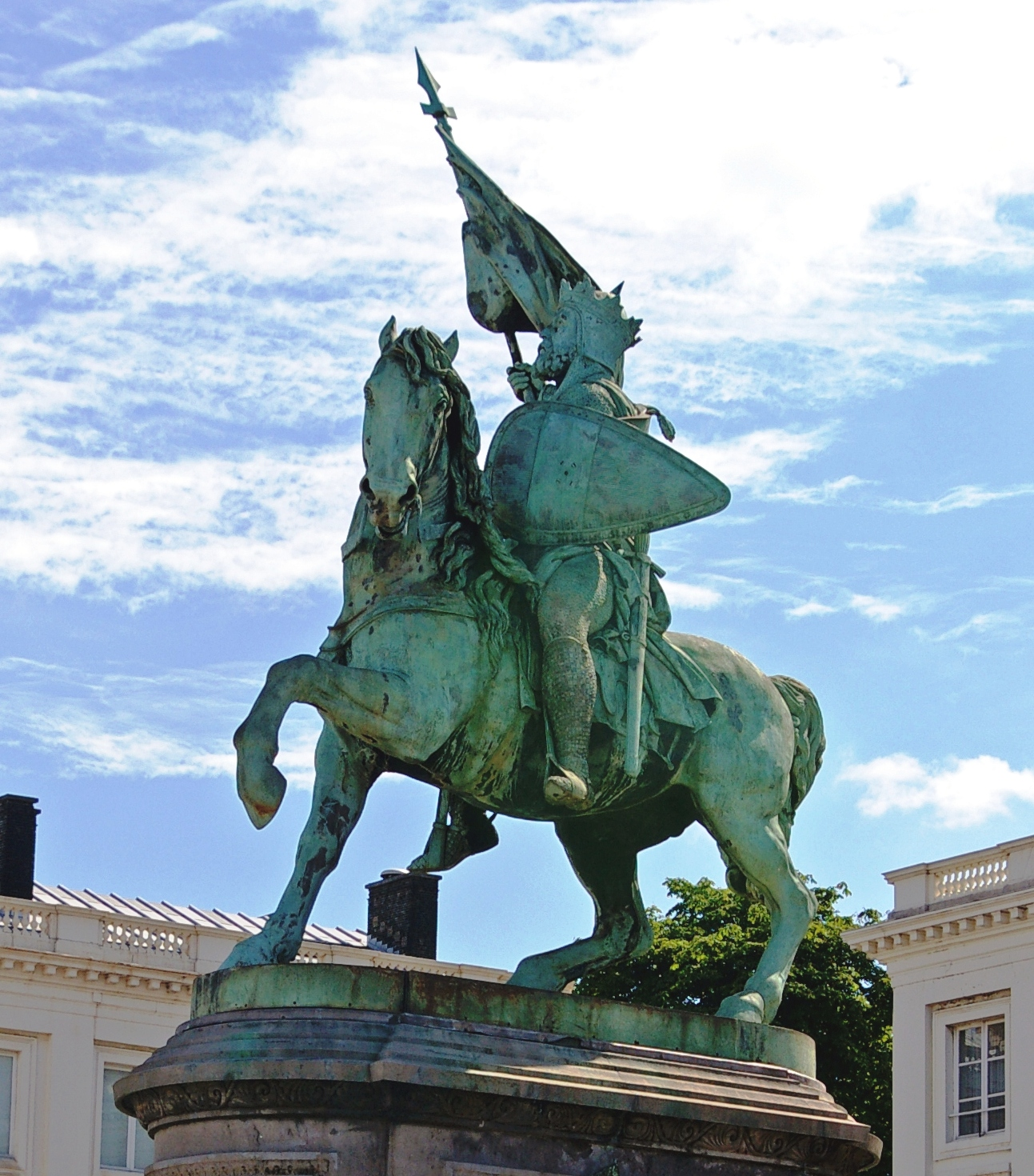
Monument to Godfrey of Bouillon, Place Royale/Koningsplein, Brussels, 1848

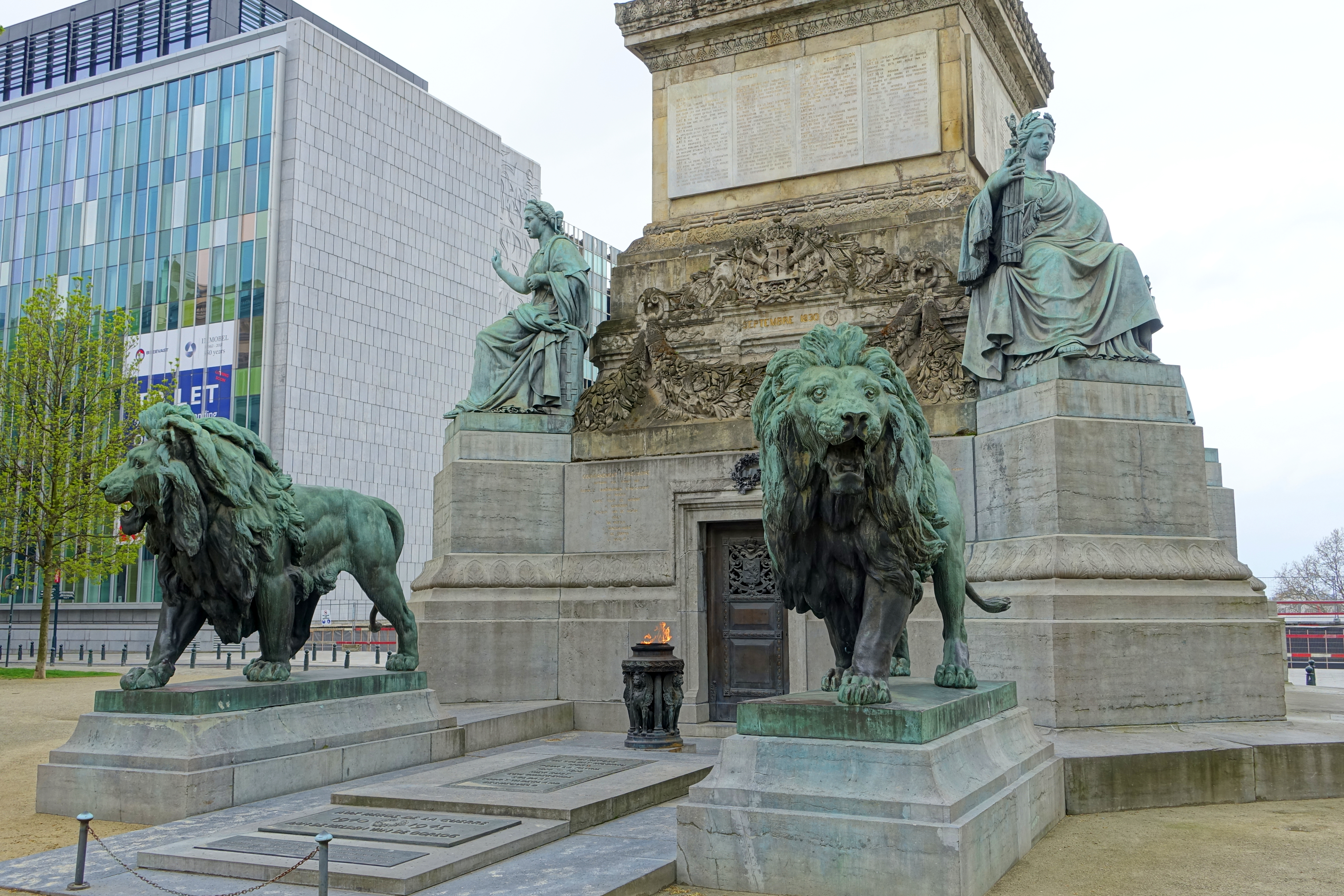
Lions, at the base of the Congress Column, Brussels, 1859

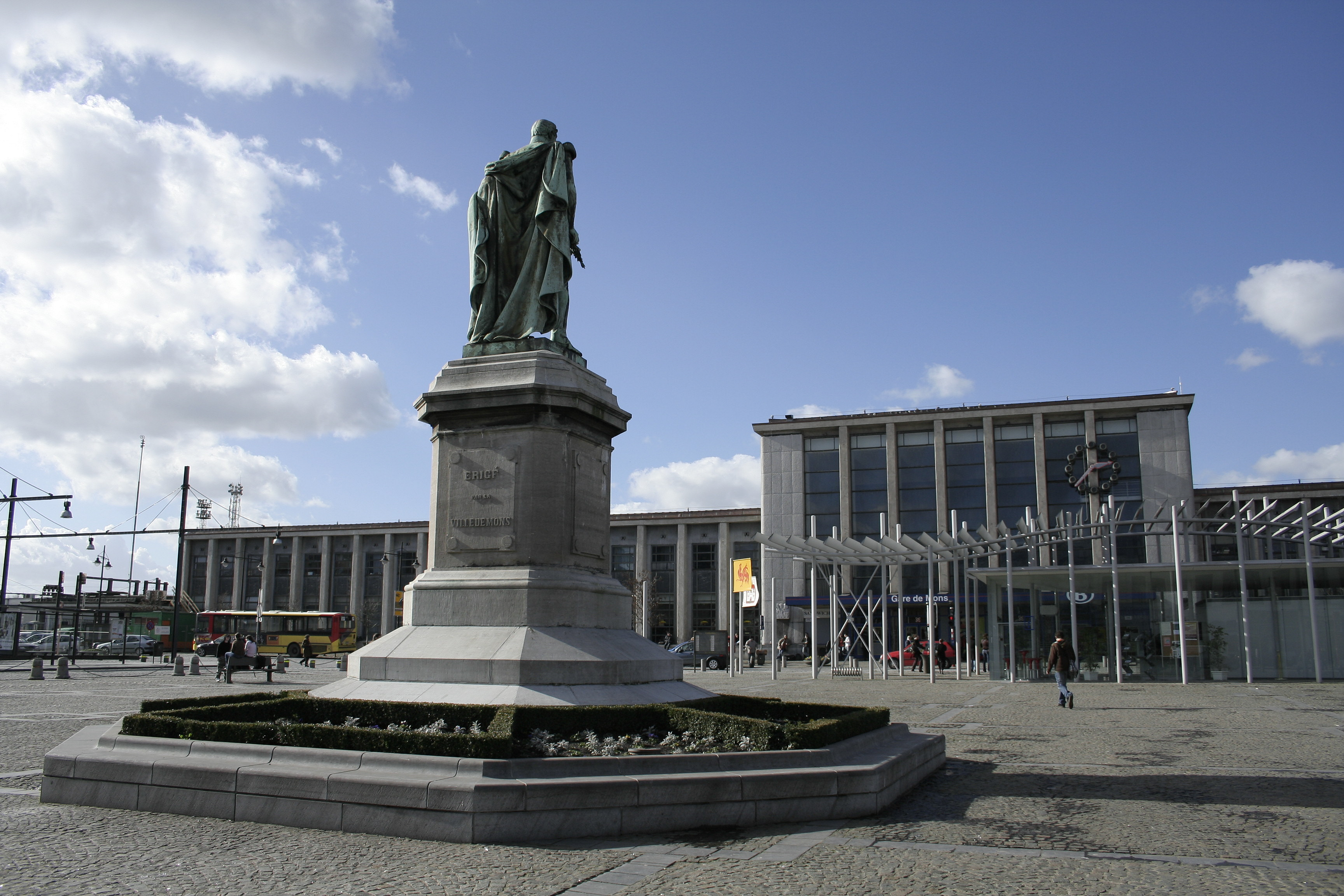
Statue of Leopold I, Place Léopold I, Mons, 1875
