= Place des Barricades =

Square in Brussels, Belgium

Place des Barricades (French); Barricadenplein (Dutch)
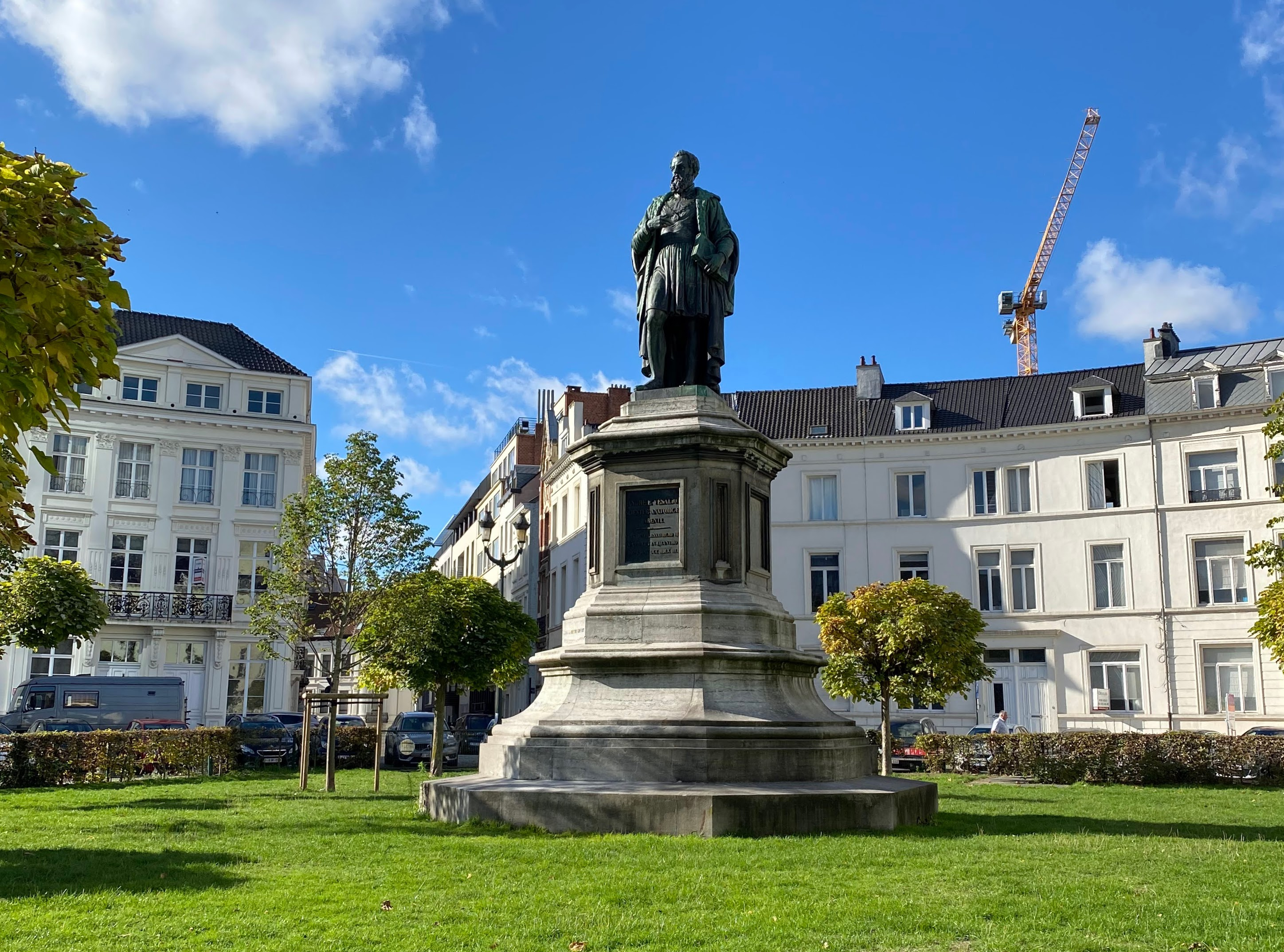
- The Place des Barricades/Barricadenplein with the statue of Andreas Vesalius in its centre

- Location within Brussels Location within Belgium
- Type: Square
- Location: City of Brussels, Brussels-Capital Region, Belgium
- Quarter: Freedom Quarter
- Postal code: 1000
- Coordinates: 50°51′05″N 04°22′03″E

The Place des Barricades (French, pronounced [plas de ba.ʁi.kad]) or Barricadenplein (Dutch, pronounced [bɑriˈkaːdə(n)ˌplɛin]), meaning "Barricades' Square", is a historic square in the Freedom Quarter of Brussels, Belgium. Its current name refers to the barricades of the September Days of the Belgian Revolution of 1830. In its centre stands a statue of Andreas Vesalius.

== See also ==
- Neoclassical architecture in Belgium
- History of Brussels
- Belgium in the long nineteenth century
