= Hendrick Joseph Dillens =

Belgian painter

Hendrik Joseph Dillens
- Born: Hendrik Joseph Dillens; 1812; Ghent, First French Empire
- Died: 1872 (aged 59–60); Ixelles, Belgium
- Occupation: Painter

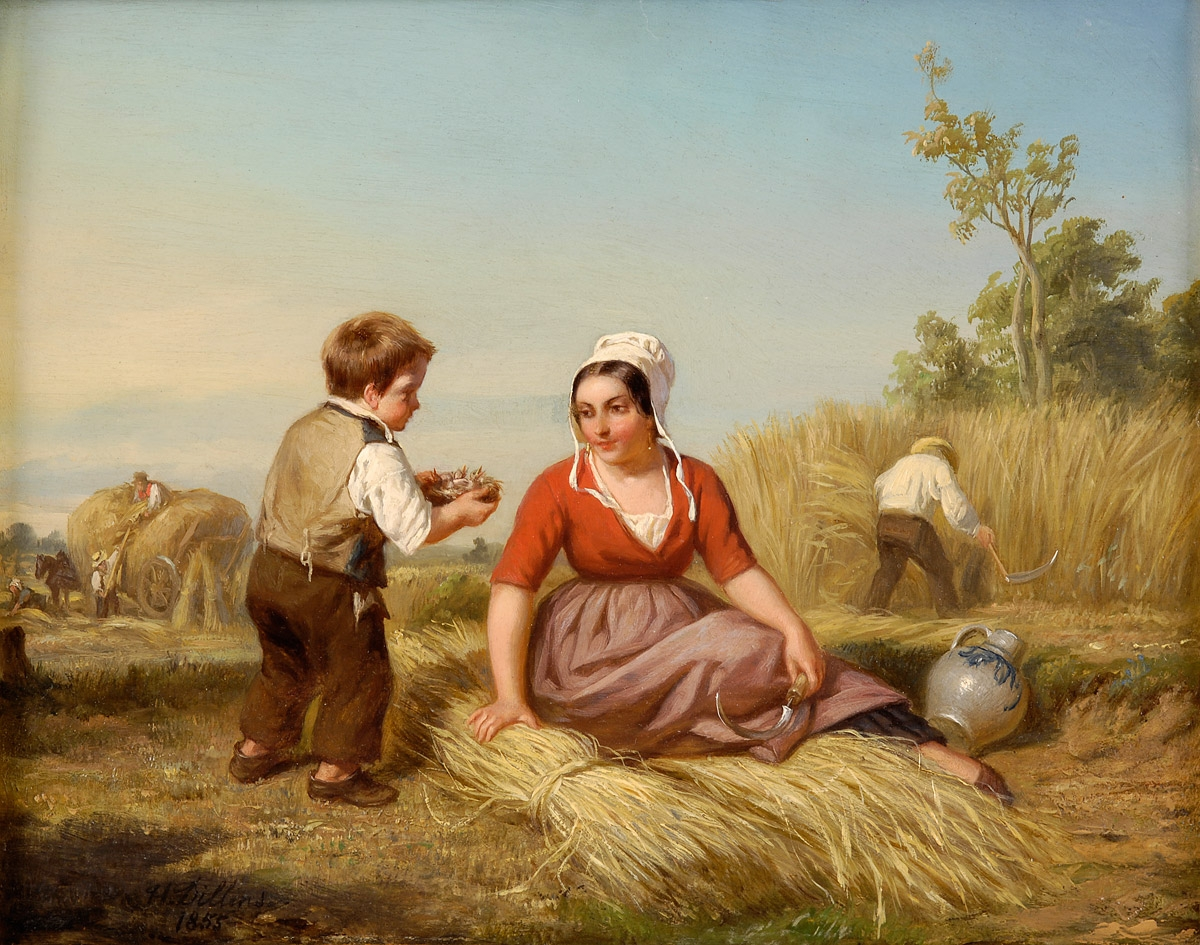
The Bird's Nest, 1855

Hendrik Joseph Dillens (1812 – 1872), a Belgian genre painter. He created several paintings including the following:

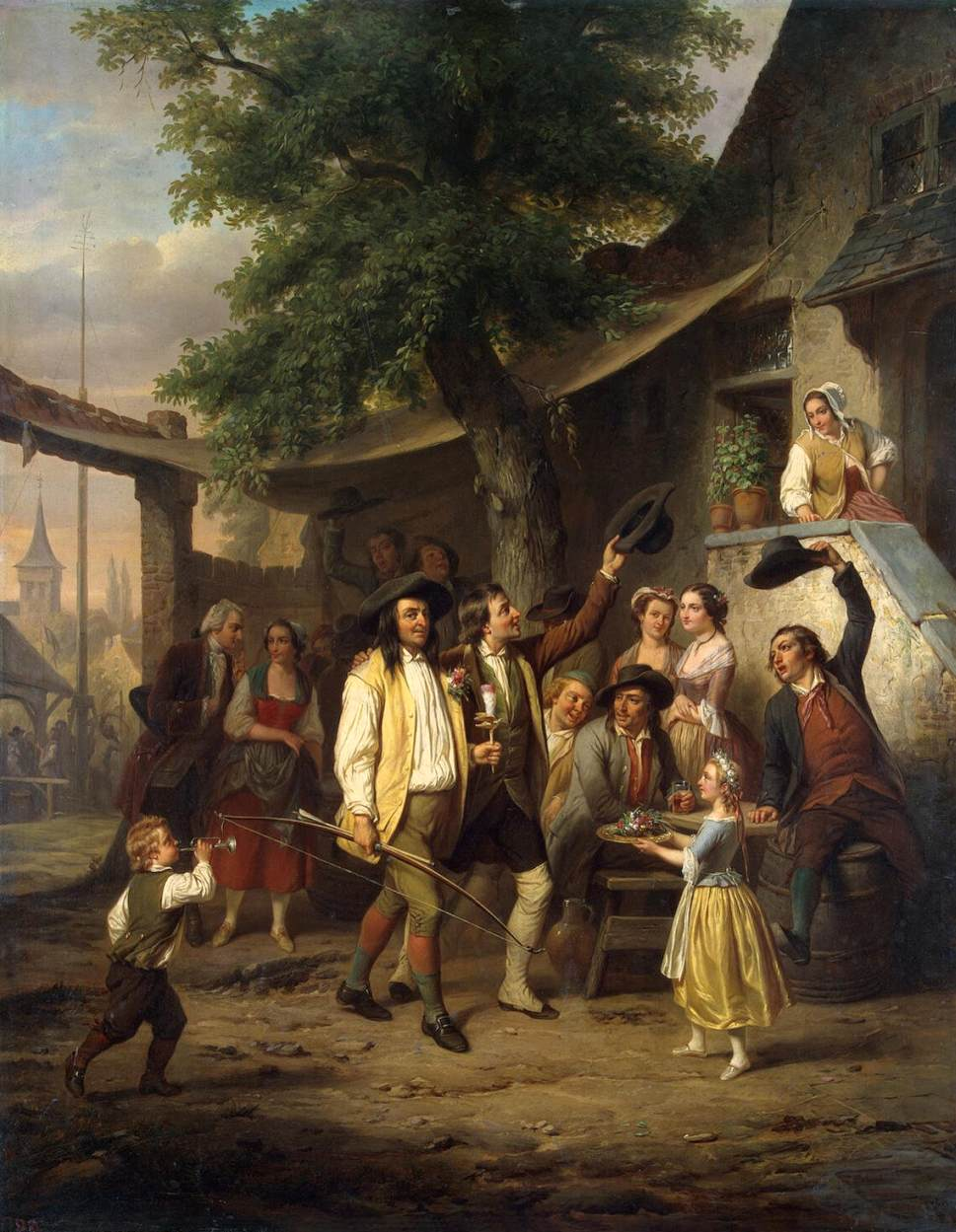
Archer the Winner, 1851, now in the Hermitage Museum in Saint Petersburg

- The French Trooper caressing his Child.
- The Capture of the Maid of Orleans.
- An Old Man giving Counsel to Two Youths.
- Consecration of a Church (with over 200 figures).
