= Geefs =

Geefs is a surname. Notable people with the surname include:

- Fanny Geefs (1807–1883), Belgian painter
- Guillaume Geefs (1805–1883), Belgian sculptor
- Joseph Geefs (1808–1885), Belgian sculptor
