= Le génie du mal =

Religious sculpture by Guillaume Geefs

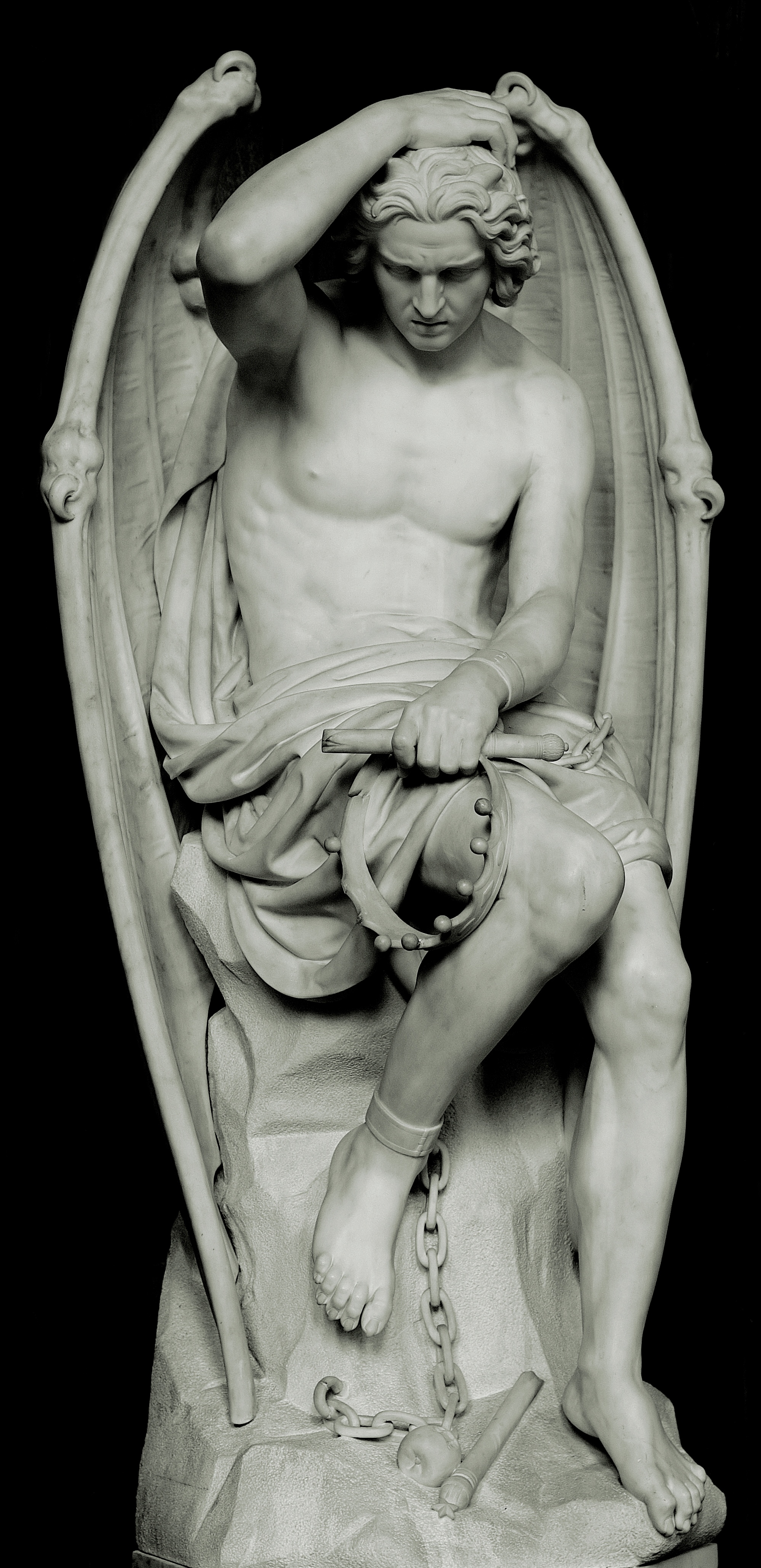
- Artist: Guillaume Geefs
- Year: 1848
- Type: white marble
- Location: St. Paul's Cathedral, Liège

Le génie du mal (French pronunciation: [lə ʒeni dy mal]; or The Genius of Evil or The Spirit of Evil), known informally in English as Lucifer or The Lucifer of Liège is a religious sculpture executed in white marble and installed in 1848 by the Belgian artist Guillaume Geefs. Francophone art historians often refer to the figure as an ange déchu, a "fallen angel".

The sculpture is located in the elaborate pulpit of St. Paul's Cathedral, Liège, and depicts a classically beautiful man chained, seated, and nearly nude but for drapery gathered over his thighs, his full length ensconced within a mandorla of bat wings. Geefs' work replaces an earlier sculpture created for the space by his younger brother Joseph Geefs, L'ange du mal, which was removed from the cathedral because of its distracting allure and "unhealthy beauty".

== Two spirits, one site ==
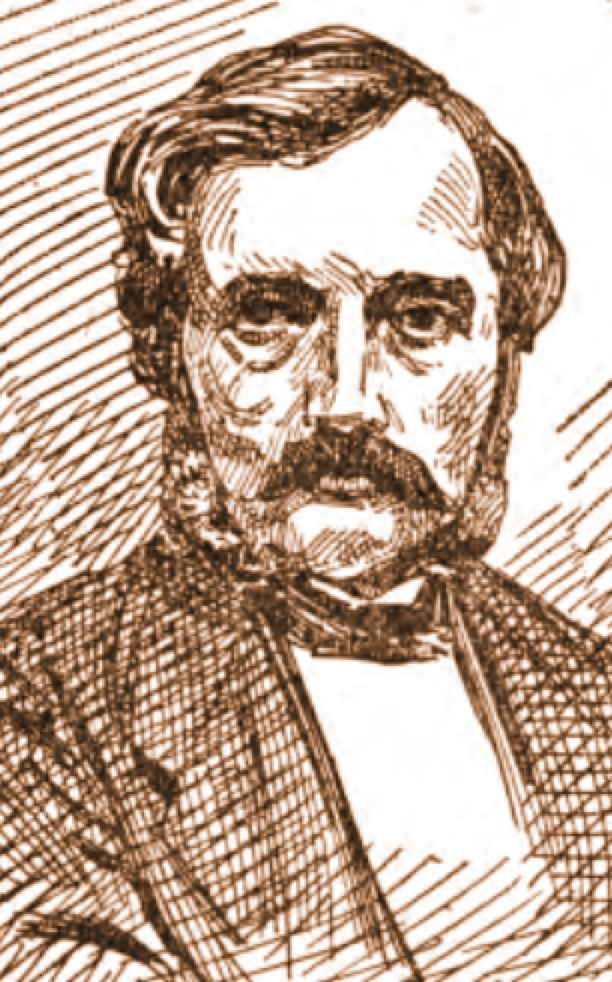
Guillaume Geefs

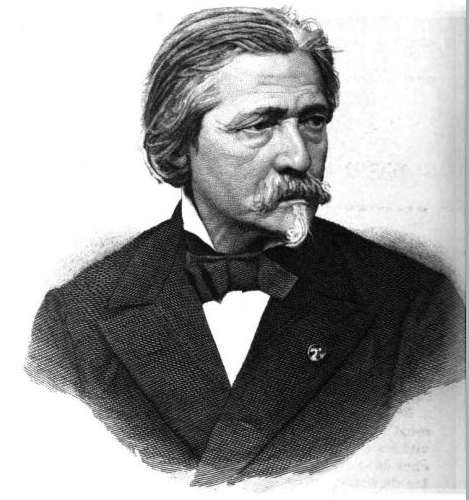
Joseph Geefs

Le génie du mal is set within an open niche formed at the base of twin ornate staircases carved with gothic floral motifs. The curved railing of the semi-spiral stairs reiterates the arc of the wings, which are retracted and cup the body. The versions by Guillaume and Joseph are strikingly similar at first glance and appear inspired by the same human model. For each, the fallen angel sits on a rock, sheltered by his folded wings; his upper torso, arms, and legs are nude, his center-parted hair nape-length. The veined, membranous wings are articulated like a bat's, with a prominent thumb claw; the knobby, sinewy olecranon combines bat and human anatomy to create an illusion of realism. A broken sceptre and stripped-off crown are held at the right hip. A tear runs from the angel's left eye. The white-marble sculptures occupy approximately the same dimensions, delimited by the space; Guillaume's measures 165 by 77 by 65 cm, or nearly five-and-a-half feet in height, with Joseph's only slightly larger at 168.5 by 86 by 65.5 cm.

== The commission ==
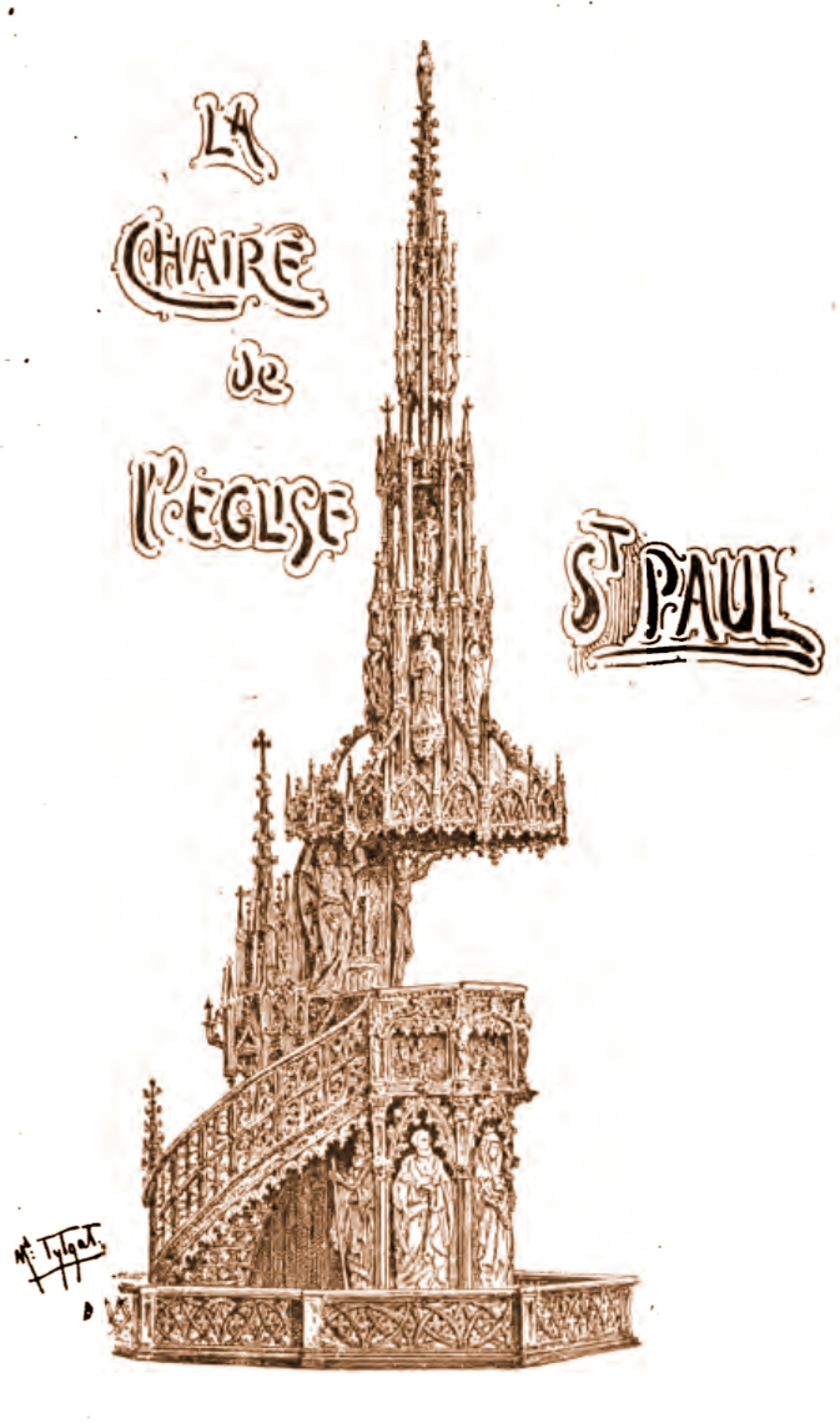
Pulpit of St. Paul's Cathedral, Liège, in a 1900 illustration by Médard Tytgat; Le génie du mal is on the unseen side

In 1837, Guillaume Geefs was put in charge of designing the elaborate pulpit for St. Paul's, the theme of which was "the Triumph of Religion over the Genius of Evil". Geefs had come to prominence creating monumental and public sculptures in honor of political figures, expressing and capitalizing on the nationalist spirit that followed Belgian independence in 1830. Techniques of realism coupled with Neoclassical restraint discipline any tendency toward Romantic heroism in these works, but Romanticism was to express itself more strongly in the Lucifer project.

From the outset, sculpture was an integral part of Geefs' pulpit design, which featured representations of the saints Peter, Paul, Hubert the first Bishop of Liège, and Lambert of Maastricht. A drawing of the pulpit by the Belgian illustrator Médard Tytgat, published in 1900, shows the front; Le génie du mal would be located at the base of the stairs on the opposite side, but the book in which the illustration appears omits mention of the work.

The commission was originally awarded to Geefs' younger brother Joseph, who completed L'ange du mal in 1842 and installed it the following year. It generated controversy at once and was criticized for not representing a Christian ideal. The cathedral administration declared that "this devil is too sublime." The local press intimated that the work was distracting the "pretty penitent girls" who should have been listening to the sermons. Bishop van Bommel soon ordered the removal of L'ange du mal, and the building committee passed the commission for the pulpit sculpture to Guillaume Geefs, whose version was installed at the cathedral permanently in 1848.

== Reception ==
Joseph exhibited his sculpture at Antwerp in 1843, along with four other works: a sculpture group called The Dream, and the individual statues St. Philomena, Faithful Love, and The Fisherman's Orphan. Known both as L'ange du mal (Angel of Evil) and Le génie du mal, the controversial piece was later received into the collections of the Royal Museums of Fine Arts of Belgium, where it has remained as of 2009.

Joseph's work was admired at the highest levels of society. Charles Frederick, Grand Duke of Saxe-Weimar, ordered a marble replica as early as 1842. The deracinated original was purchased for 3,000 florins by William II, King of the Netherlands, and was dispersed with the rest of his collection in 1850 following his death. In 1854, the artist sold a plaster cast of the statue to Baron Bernard August von Lindenau, the German statesman, astronomer, and art collector for whom the Lindenau-Museum Altenburg is named. The success of the work elevated Joseph Geefs to the top tier of sculptors in his day.

L'ange du mal is among six statues featured in a painting by Pierre Langlet, The Sculpture Hall of the Brussels Museum (Salle de sculpture du Musée de Bruxelles, 1882), along with Love and Malice by another of the six Geefs sculptor-brothers, Jean. It was not uniformly admired even as a work of art. When it appeared in an 1862 international exhibition, the reviewer criticized Geefs' work as "gentle and languid" and lacking in "muscle", "a devil sick... : the sting of Satan is taken out."

=== 'This devil is too sublime' ===
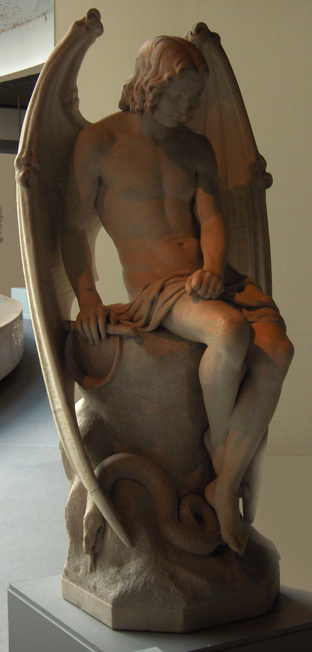
L'ange du mal (1842) by Joseph Geefs

Other than the vespertilionid wings, the fallen angel of Joseph Geefs takes a completely human form, made manifest by its artistic near-nudity. A languid scarf skims the groin, the hips are bared, and the open thighs form an avenue that leads to shadow. The serpentine curve of waist and hip is given compositional play in relation to the wing-arcs. The torso is fit but youthful; smooth and graceful, almost androgynous. The angel's expression has been described as "serious, somber, even fierce," and the cast-down gaze directs the viewer's eye along the body and thighs to the parted knees. The most obvious satanic element in addition to the wings is the snake uncoiling across the base of the rock. L'ange du mal has been called "one of the most disturbing works of its time."

Joseph's sculptures are "striking for their perfect finish and grace, their elegant and even poetic line," but while exhibiting these qualities in abundance, L'ange du mal is exceptional within the artist's body of work for its subject matter:

It compellingly illustrates the Romantic era's attraction to darkness and the abyss, and the rehabilitation of the rebellious fallen angel. The chiropteral wings, far from inspiring revulsion, form a frame that enhances the beauty of a youthful body.

As a sort of "winged Adonis", the fallen angel can be seen as developing from Geefs' early nude Adonis allant à la chasse avec son chien (Adonis Goes Hunting with His Hound). The composition of L'ange du mal has been compared to that of Jean-Jacques Feuchère's small bronze Satan (1833), with Geefs' angel notably "less diabolic". The humanizing of Lucifer through nudity is characteristic also of the Italian sculptor Costantino Corti's colossal work, executed a few years after the Geefs' versions. Corti depicts his Lucifer as frontally nude, though shielded discreetly by the pinnacle of rock he straddles, and framed with the feathered wings of his angel origin.

== Chained genius ==
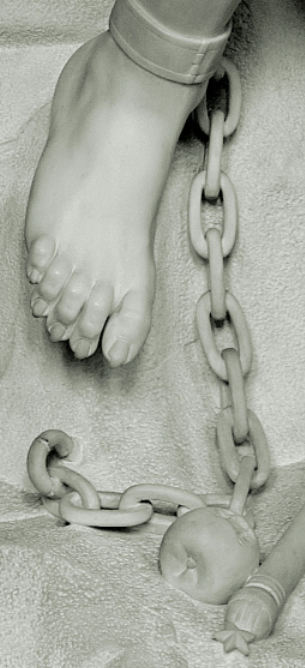
Detail of Le génie du mal: chained ankle, tasted apple, broken sceptre

In contrast to Joseph's work, Guillaume's génie shows less flesh and is marked more strongly by satanic iconography as neither human nor angelic. Whether Guillaume succeeded in removing the "seductive" elements may be a matter of individual perception.

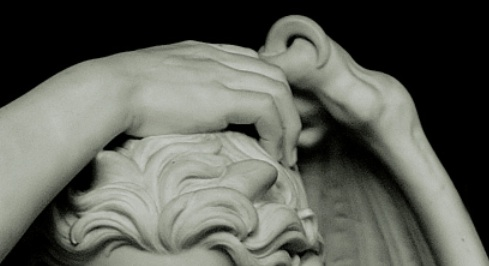
Horns and human and animal anatomy (detail)

Guillaume shifts the direction of the fallen angel's gaze so that it leads away from the body, with Lucifer's knees drawn together protectively. The drapery hangs from behind the right shoulder, pools on the right side, and undulates thickly over the thighs, concealing the hips, not quite covering the navel. At the same time, the flesh that remains exposed is resolutely modeled, particularly in the upper arms, pectorals, and calves, to reveal a more defined, muscled masculinity. The uplifted right arm allows the artist to explore the patterned tensions of the serratus anterior muscles, and the gesture and the angle of the head suggest that the génie is warding off "divine chastisement".

=== Symbols of Lucifer ===
Guillaume added several details to enhance the Luciferian iconography and the theme of punishment: at the angel's feet, the dropped "forbidden fruit", an apple with bite marks, along with the broken-off tip of the sceptre, the stellar finial of which marks Lucifer as the Morning Star of classical tradition. The nails are narrow and elongated, like talons.

A pair of horns may be intended to further dehumanize the figure, while introducing another note of ambiguity. Horns are animalistic markers of the satanic or demonic, but in a parallel tradition of religious iconography, "horns" represent points of light. Gods from antiquity who personify celestial phenomena such as the Sun or stars are crowned with rays, and some depictions of Moses, the most famous being the sculpture of Michelangelo, are carved with "horns" similar to those of Geefs' Lucifer; see Horns of Moses.

=== Promethean Lucifer ===
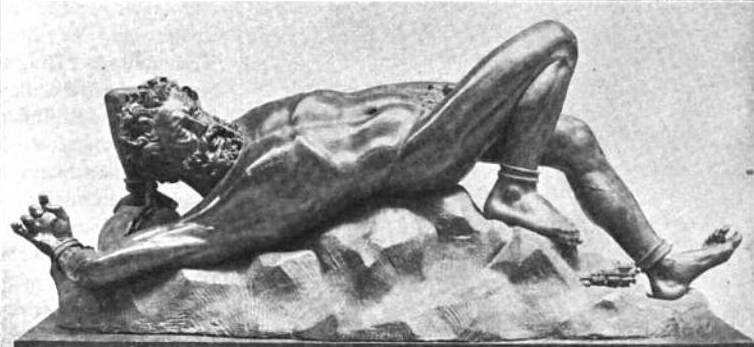
A bronze Prometheus Bound (1845) by Belgian artist Paul Bouré, who once studied with Guillaume Geefs

But the most apparent departure from L'ange du mal is the placing of Lucifer in bondage, with his right ankle and left wrist chained. In 19th-century reinterpretations of ancient Greek and Christian myths, Lucifer was often cast as a Promethean figure, drawing on a tradition that the fallen angel was chained in Hell just as the Titan had been chained and tortured on the rock by Zeus: "The same Prometheus who is taken as an analogue of the crucified Christ is regarded also as a type of Lucifer," wrote Harold Bloom in remarks on Mary Shelley's 19th-century classic Frankenstein, subtitled The Modern Prometheus. In A.H. Krappe's folkloric typology, Lucifer conforms to a type that includes Prometheus and the Germanic Loki.

Guillaume Geefs' addition of fetters, with the swagged chain replacing the sneering serpent in Joseph's version, displays the angel's defeat in pious adherence to Christian ideology. At the same time, the titanic struggle of the tortured genius to free himself from metaphorical chains was a motif of Romanticism, which took hold in Belgium in the wake of the Revolution of 1830. The Belgians had just secured their own "liberation"; over the ensuing two decades, there had been a craze for public sculpture, by the Geefs brothers and others, that celebrated the leaders of independence. The magnificently human figure of the iconic rebel who failed might have been expected to elicit a complex or ambivalent response. The suffering face of the génie, stripped of the angry hauteur of L'ange du mal, has been read as expressing remorse and despair; a tear slips from the left eye.

== Sister of angels ==
In a 1990 essay, Belgian art historian Jacques Van Lennep discussed how the conception of Le génie du mal was influenced by Alfred de Vigny's long philosophical poem Éloa, ou La sœur des anges ("Eloa, or the Sister of Angels"), published in 1824, which explored the possibility of Lucifer's redemption through love. In this "lush and lyrical" narrative poem, Lucifer sets out to seduce the beautiful Eloa, an angel born from a tear shed by Christ at the death of Lazarus. The Satanic lover is "literally a handsome devil, physically dashing, intellectually agile, irresistibly charismatic in speech and manner": in short, a Romantic hero. "Since you are so beautiful," the naïve Eloa says, "you are no doubt good."

Lucifer declares that "I am he whom one loves and does not know," and says he weeps for the powerless and grants them the occasional reprieve of delight or oblivion. Despite Eloa's attempt to reconcile him with God, Lucifer cannot set aside his destructive pride. In the end, Eloa's love condemns her to Hell with Lucifer, and his triumph over her only brings him sadness.

== Himmelsweg ==
In 1986, the Belgian artist Jacques Charlier made Le génie du mal a focal point of his installation Himmelsweg ("Road to Heaven"). A framed photograph of the sculpture hangs over a slender pedestal table that is draped with a black cloth. A transparent case on the table contains three books: a Carmelite study on the subject of Satan, a scientific treatise on air, and a memorial of the Belgian Jews killed at Auschwitz. On the lower shelf of the table are shackles.

Charlier has described his use of Le génie du mal as "a Romantic image that speaks to us of seduction, evil, and the sin of forgetting." The German title of the work refers to the Nazi euphemism or "cold joke" for the access ramp that led to the gas chambers: "The Road to Paradise leads to Hell; the Fall is so close to redemption."

== Selected bibliography ==
- Soo Yang Geuzaine et Alexia Creusen, "Guillaume Geefs: Le Génie du Mal (1848) à la cathédrale Saint-Paul de Liège," Vers la modernité. Le XIXe siècle au Pays de Liège, exhibition presented by the University of Liège, 5 October 2001 to 20 January 2002 online catalogue.
- Michael Palmer et al., 500 chefs-d'oeuvre de l'art belge du XV^{e} siècle à nos jours (Éditions Racine, n.d.), p. 203 online.
- Edmond Marchal, "Étude sur la vie et les œuvres de Joseph-Charles Geefs," Annuaire de l'Académie Royale des sciences, des lettres et des beaux-arts de Belgique (Brussels, 1888).
- Royal Museums of Fine Arts of Belgium, Le génie du mal by Joseph Geefs, Fabritius online catalogue.
