= Charles Morren =

Charles Morren may refer to:

- Charles François Antoine Morren (1807–1858) (C. Morren), Belgian botanist, horticulturist and professor at the University of Liège
- Charles Jacques Édouard Morren (1833–1886) (E. Morren), Belgian botanist, specialist in Bromeliaceae and son of the above person
- Charles Morren, Belgian footballer for F91 Dudelange
