= La Belgique Horticole =

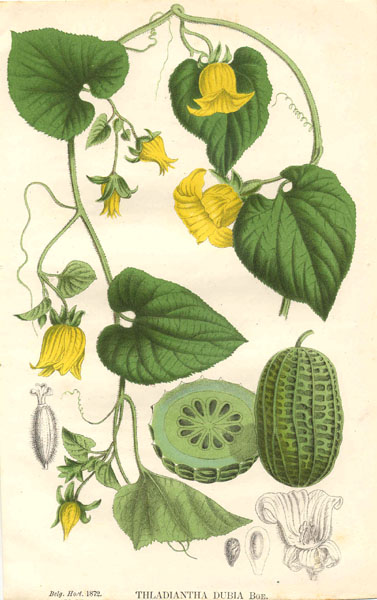
- Thladiantha dubia from La Belgique Horticole
- Editor: Charles Morren (1851–1857)
- Editor: Édouard Morren (1855–1885)
- Categories: Horticulture
- First issue: 1851
- Final issue: 1885
- Country: Belgium
- Based in: Liège
- Language: French

La Belgique Horticole ("Horticultural Belgium") was an illustrated horticultural review published in Liège, Belgium, from 1851 to 1885. For the first four years it was edited by Charles Morren, director of the Botanical Garden of Liège. From 1855 to 1857 editorship was shared jointly with his son and successor Édouard Morren, who continued as sole editor after his father's death in 1858.

== Illustrators ==
Illustrators and engravers who worked for La Belgique Horticole included Erin Corr, Jozef Linnig, Guillaume Severeyns and Michael Verzwyvel.
