= Vriesea lubbersii =

Scientific classification
- Kingdom: Plantae
- Clade: Tracheophytes
- Clade: Angiosperms
- Clade: Monocots
- Clade: Commelinids
- Order: Poales
- Family: Bromeliaceae
- Genus: Vriesea
- Species: V. lubbersii

Binomial name
- Vriesea lubbersii (Baker) E.Morren ex Mez

Synonyms
- Tillandsia lubbersii Baker

Species of plant

Vriesea lubbersii is a species of flowering plant in Bromeliaceae family. It is endemic to Brazil.

== Cultivars ==
- Vriesea 'Africain'
- Vriesea 'Firecracker'
- Vriesea 'Plain Lubberly'
