= Roman Gladiator (sculpture) =

Statue in San Francisco, California, U.S.

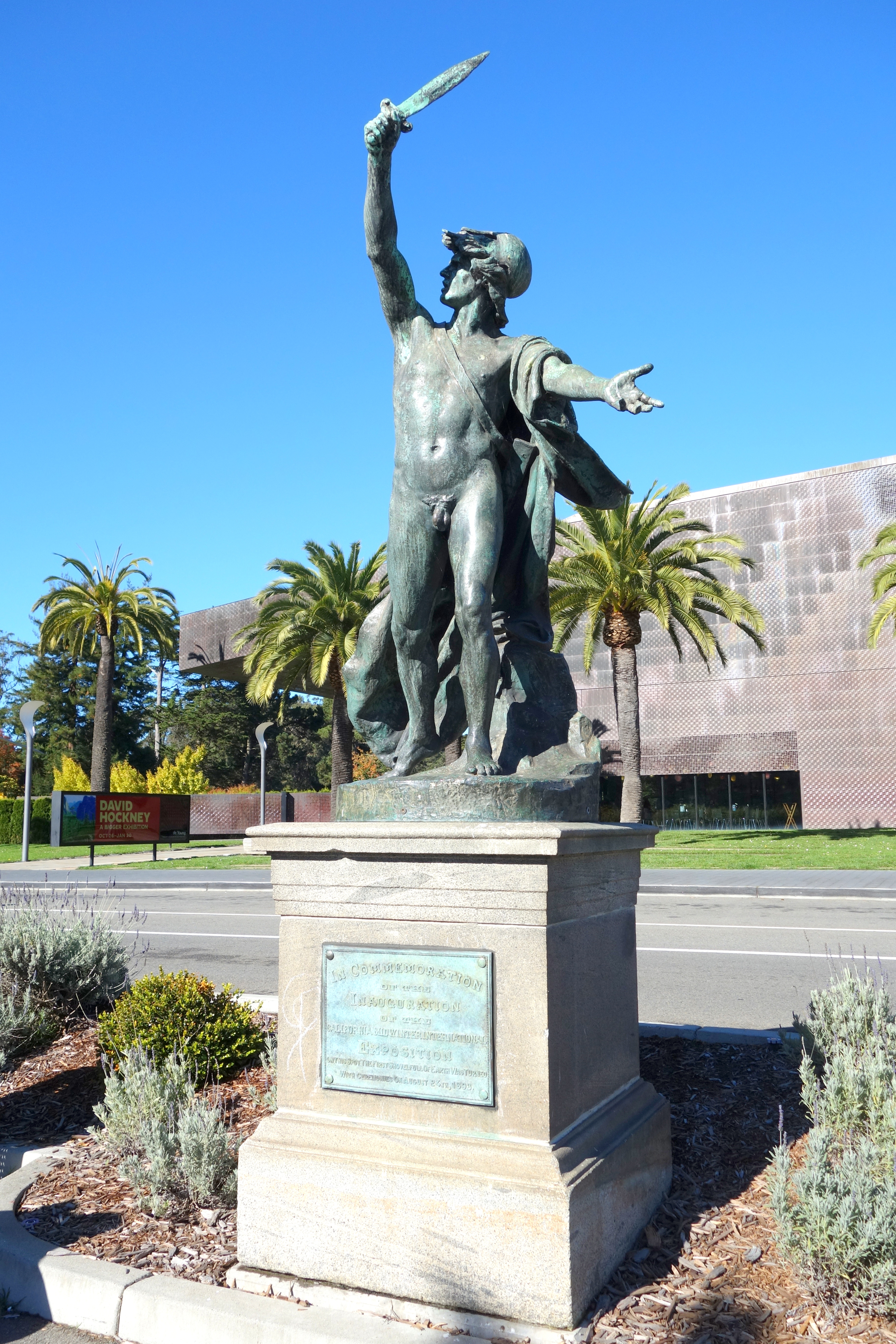
- The statue in 2013
- Artist: Gustave Georges (Joris) Theodore Geefs
- Year: 1881
- Medium: Bronze sculpture
- Location: San Francisco, California, U.S.
- 37.770723°N 122.468457°W

Roman Gladiator is an outdoor 1881 bronze sculpture by Gustave Georges (Joris) Theodore Geefs (20 November 1850 – 4 December 1933), the son of Joseph Geefs who is a brother of Guillaume Geefs, installed in San Francisco's Golden Gate Park, in the U.S. state of California.

== Description ==
The statue depicts a nude man holding a sword, and wearing a cloak and helmet. It measures approximately 100 x 36.25 x 33 inches, and rests on a base that measures approximately 40 x 44 x 44 inches. The bronze plaque on the front of the base reads:

IN COMMEMORATION / OF THE INAUGURATION / OF THE / CALIFORNIA MIDWINTER INTERNATIONAL / EXPOSITION / ON THIS SPOT THE FIRST SHOVELFULL OF EARTH WAS TURNED / WITH CEREMONIES ON AUGUST 24th 1893.

== History ==
The sculpture was surveyed by the Smithsonian Institution's "Save Outdoor Sculpture!" program in 1992, and is administered by the San Francisco Arts Commission.

== See also ==
- 1881 in art
