= Vriesea jonghei =

Scientific classification
- Kingdom: Plantae
- Clade: Tracheophytes
- Clade: Angiosperms
- Clade: Monocots
- Clade: Commelinids
- Order: Poales
- Family: Bromeliaceae
- Genus: Vriesea
- Species: V. jonghei

Binomial name
- Vriesea jonghei (K.Koch) É.Morren

Synonyms
- Tillandsia jonghei K.Koch; Encholirium jonghei Libon; Vriesea xiphion Platzm. ex Antoine; Vriesea gamba F.J.Müll.

Species of epiphyte

Vriesea jonghei is a species of flowering plant in the family Bromeliaceae . This species is an epiphyte native to Brazil, French Guiana, and Trinidad and Tobago.

== Cultivars ==
- Vriesea 'Flammea'
- Vriesea 'Van Ackeri'
