= Vriesea billbergioides =

Scientific classification
- Kingdom: Plantae
- Clade: Embryophytes
- Clade: Tracheophytes
- Clade: Spermatophytes
- Clade: Angiosperms
- Clade: Monocots
- Clade: Commelinids
- Order: Poales
- Family: Bromeliaceae
- Genus: Vriesea
- Species: V. billbergioides

Binomial name
- Vriesea billbergioides É.Morren ex Mez

Species of flowering plant

Vriesea billbergioides is a species of flowering plant in the family Bromeliaceae. This species is endemic to Brazil.

== Taxonomy ==
=== Varieties ===
Recognized varieties include:

- Vriesea billbergioides var. ampla L.B.Sm.
- Vriesea billbergioides var. billbergioides
- Vriesea billbergioides var. subnuda L.B.Sm.
