= Erin Corr =

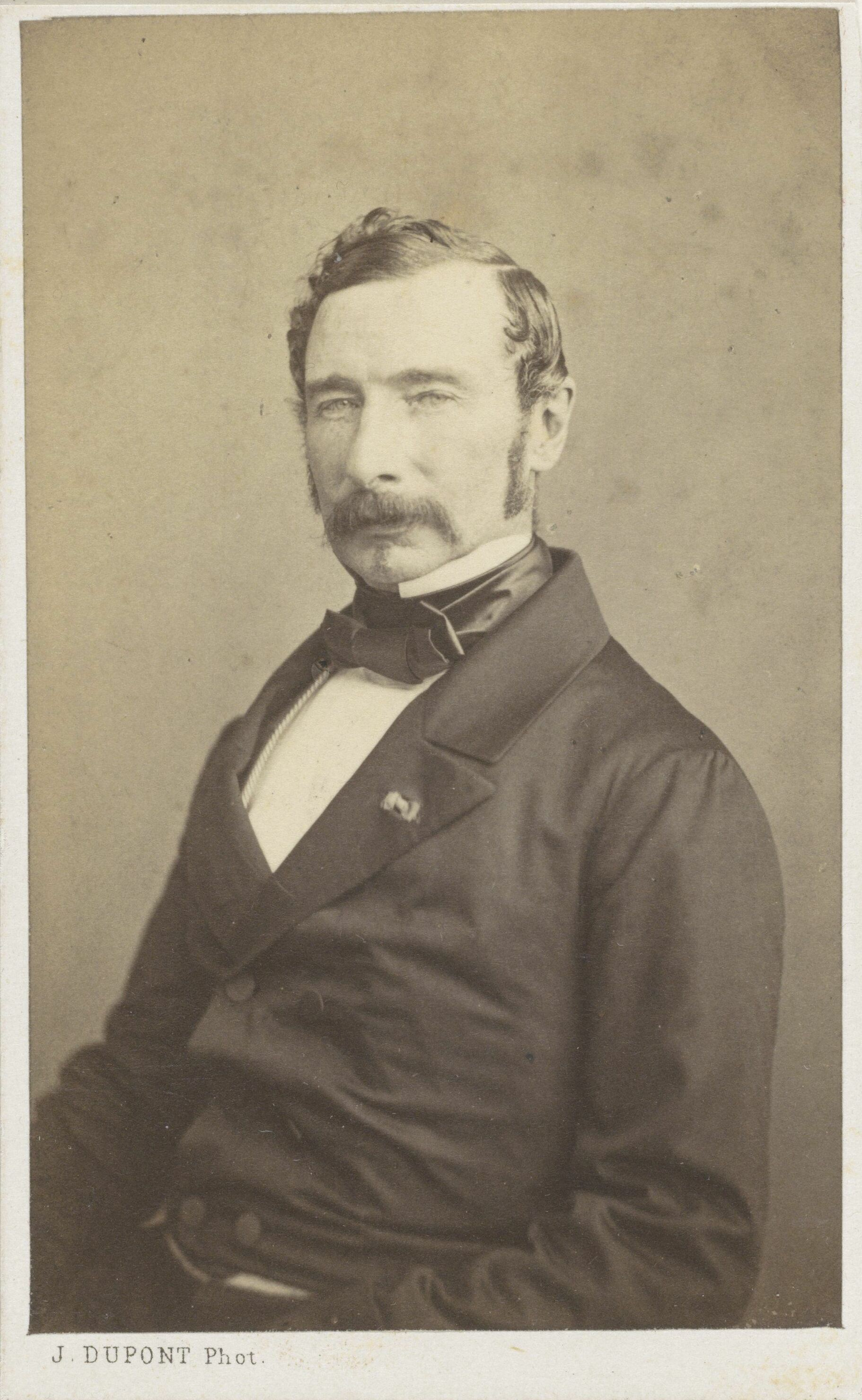
Erin Corr

Erin Corr (1803 – August 10, 1862) was an Irish engraver, who was born in Brussels of Irish descent. He spent 10 years engraving the copper-plate for Rubens's Descent from the Cross. In 1833, he was elected into the National Academy of Design as an Honorary Academician. He was among the illustrators and engravers who worked on Charles Morren's horticultural review, La Belgique Horticole.

He is the brother of the Belgian painter Isabelle Marie Françoise (Fanny) Geefs-Corr (1807–1883).

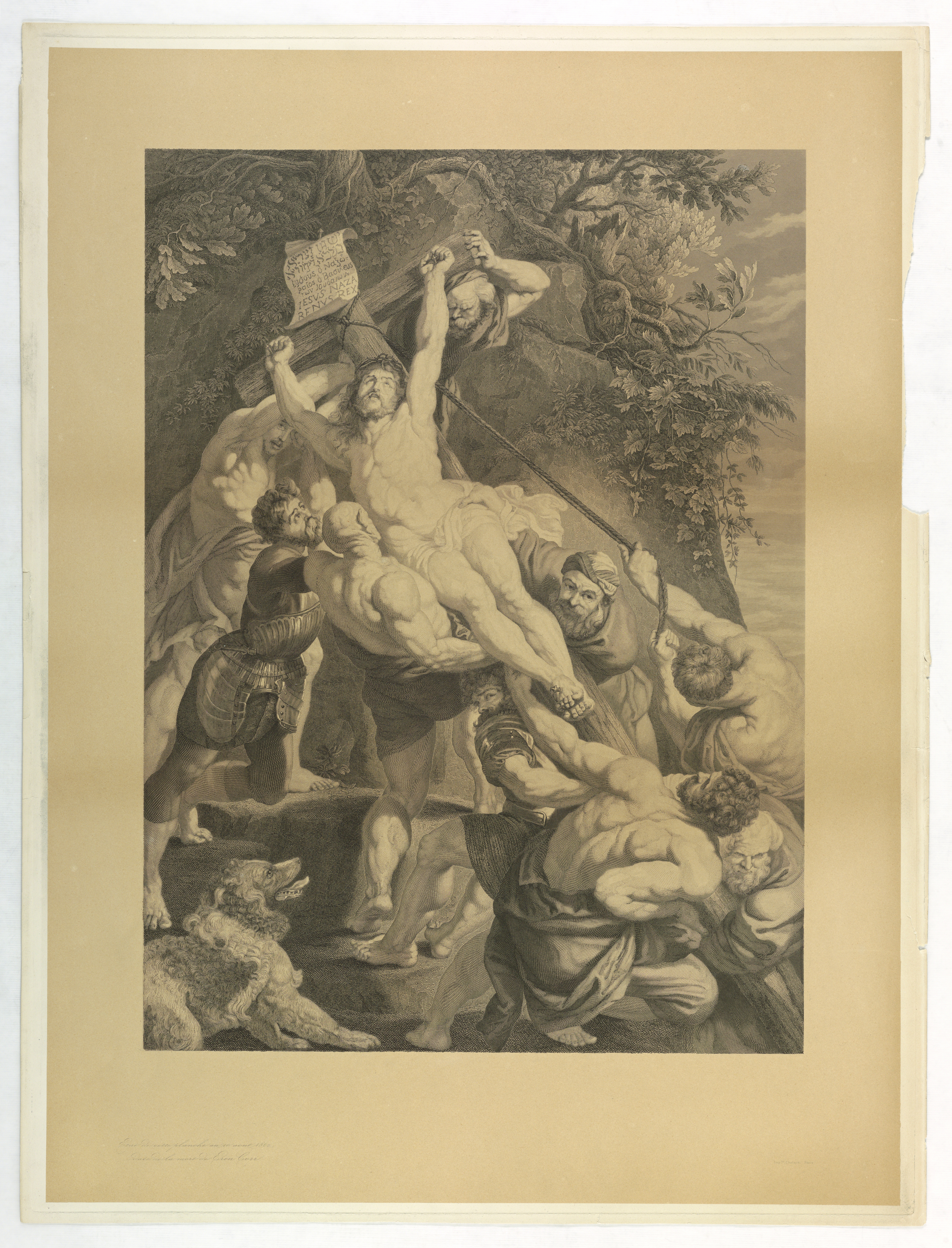
Elevation of the Cross

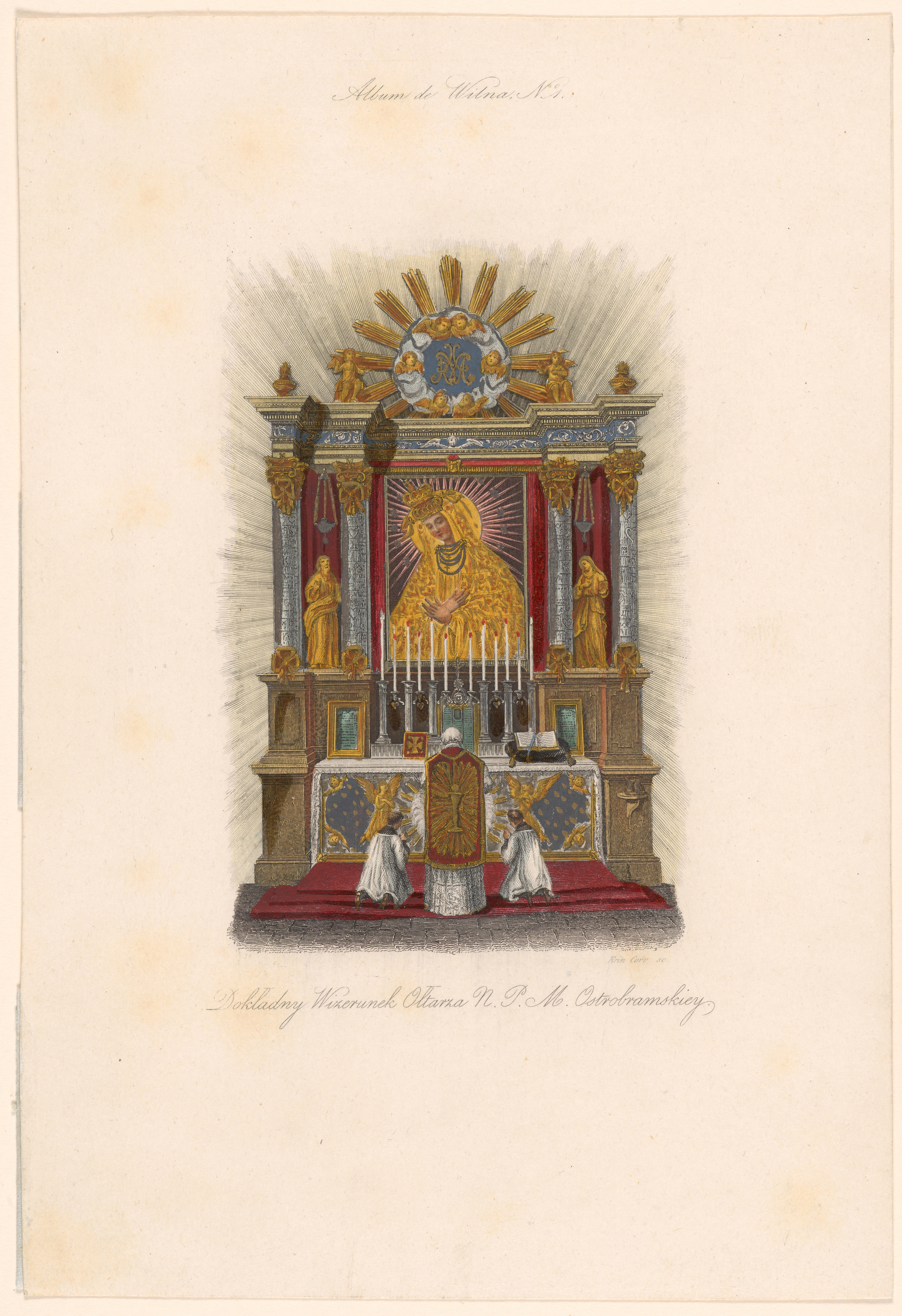
Our Lady of the Gate of Dawn, Vilnius

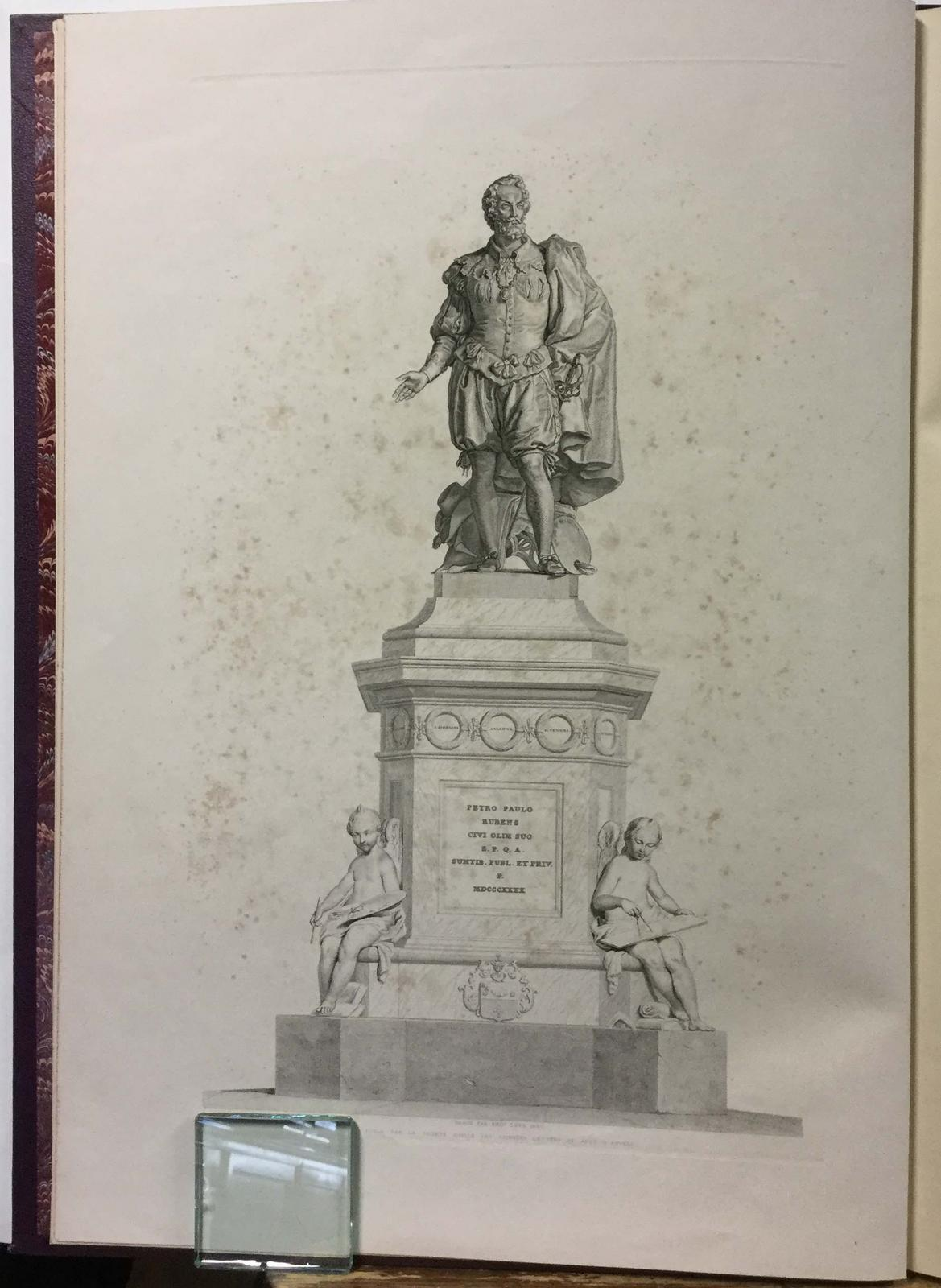
Petro Paulo Rubens

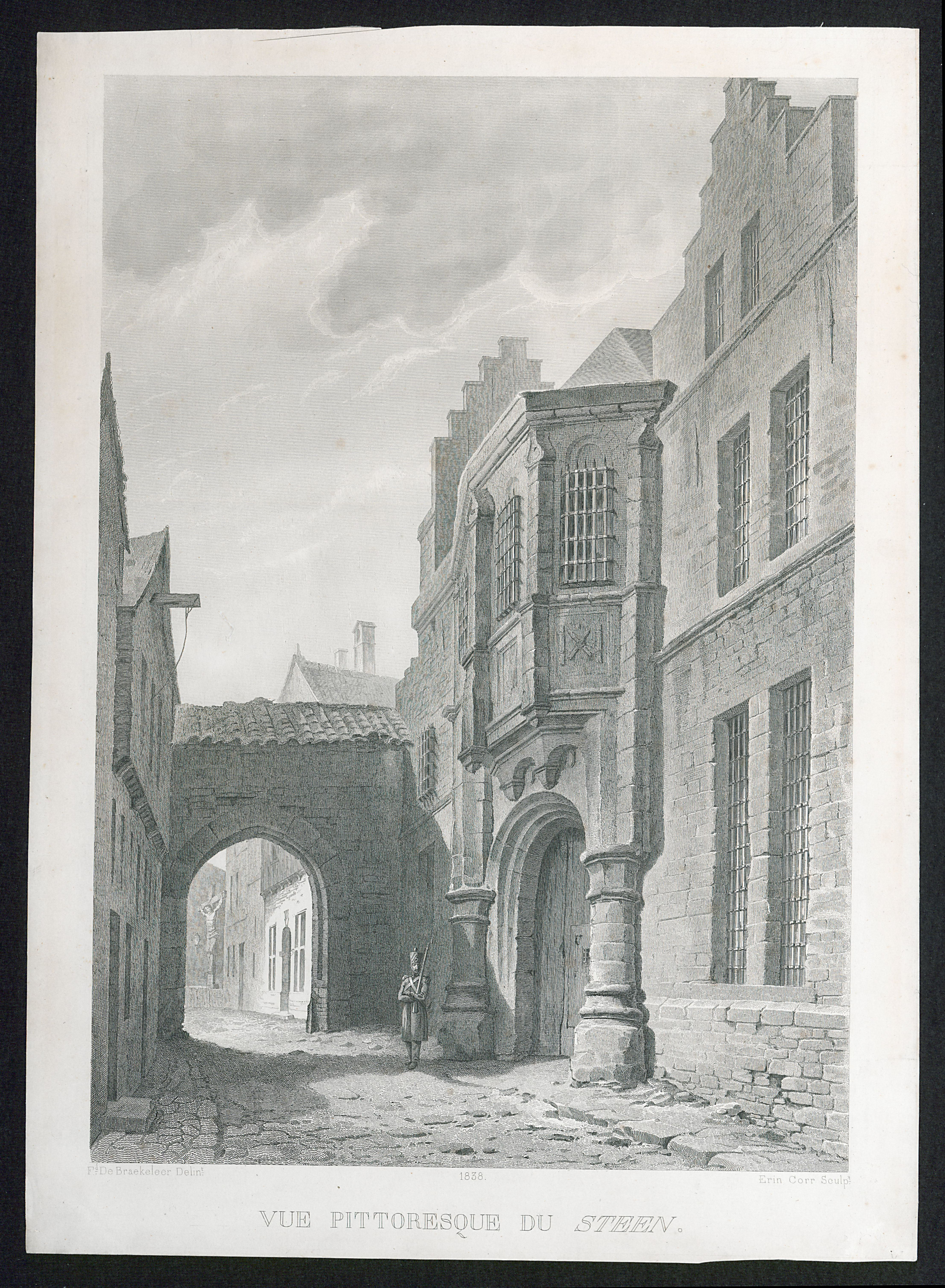
Het Steen, Antwerp
