= Vriesea poenulata =

Scientific classification
- Kingdom: Plantae
- Clade: Tracheophytes
- Clade: Angiosperms
- Clade: Monocots
- Clade: Commelinids
- Order: Poales
- Family: Bromeliaceae
- Genus: Vriesea
- Species: V. poenulata

Binomial name
- Vriesea poenulata (Baker) E.Morren ex Mez

Synonyms
- Tillandsia poenulata Baker

Species of plant

Vriesea poenulata is a species of flowering plant in the Bromeliaceae family. It is endemic to Brazil.

== Cultivars ==
- Vriesea 'Starburst'
