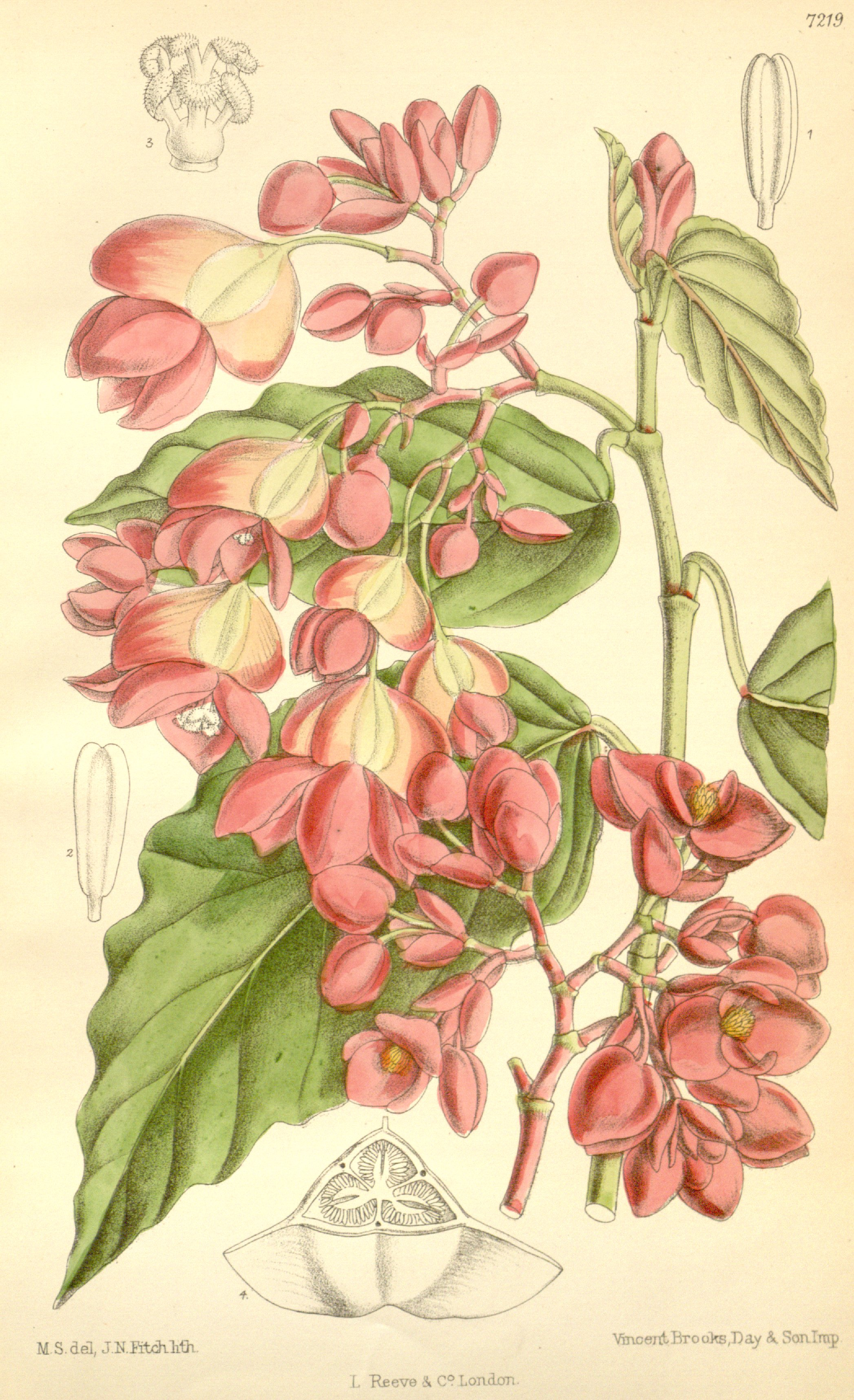
- Botanical illustration

Scientific classification
- Kingdom: Plantae
- Clade: Embryophytes
- Clade: Tracheophytes
- Clade: Spermatophytes
- Clade: Angiosperms
- Clade: Eudicots
- Clade: Rosids
- Order: Cucurbitales
- Family: Begoniaceae
- Genus: Begonia
- Species: B. limmingheiana

Binomial name
- Begonia limmingheiana É.Morren

Synonyms
- Begonia fritz-muelleri Brade; Begonia glaucophylla Gower ex Hook.f.; Begonia glaucophylla var. scandens (Hovey) Fotsch; Begonia glaucophylla scandens Hovey

= Begonia limmingheiana =

Species of flowering plant

Begonia limmingheiana, also known as the shrimp begonia, is a species of flowering plant in the family Begoniaceae. It is native to Brazil (Bahia to Rio de Janeiro). It was formerly a synonym of Begonia radicans, but has been reinstated as a valid species name in 2025.

It (formerly as B. radicans) has gained the Royal Horticultural Society's Award of Garden Merit.
