= Puya floccosa =

Scientific classification
- Kingdom: Plantae
- Clade: Tracheophytes
- Clade: Angiosperms
- Clade: Monocots
- Clade: Commelinids
- Order: Poales
- Family: Bromeliaceae
- Genus: Puya
- Subgenus: Puya subg. Puyopsis
- Species: P. floccosa

Binomial name
- Puya floccosa (Linden) É.Morren ex Mez

Synonyms
- List: Pitcairnia floccosa (Linden) Regel; Pourretia floccosa Linden; Pitcairnia guyanensis Baker; Pitcairnia quetameensis (André) Baker; Pourretia achupalla Linden; Pourretia lanuginosa Regel; Pourretia violacea Regel; Puya floccosa var. compacta L.B.Sm.; Puya guianensis Klotzsch; Puya meridensis É.Morren; Puya quetameensis André

Species of flowering plant

Puya floccosa is a species of flowering plant in the family Bromeliaceae. It is native to Brazil, Colombia, Costa Rica and Venezuela.
