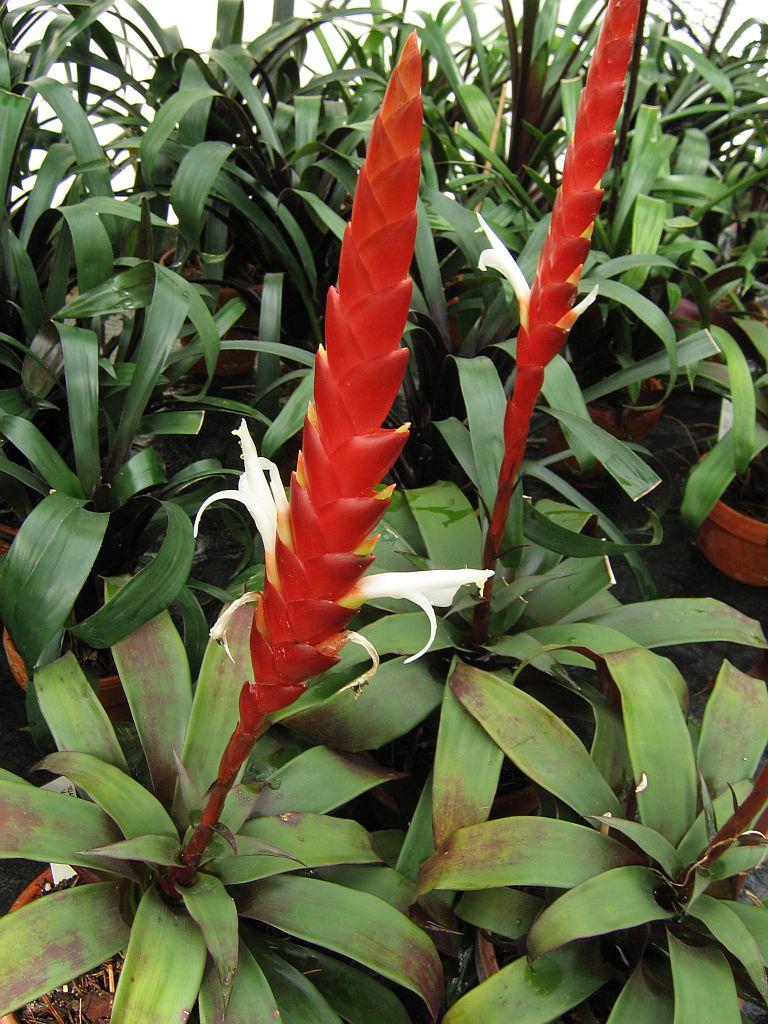

Scientific classification
- Kingdom: Plantae
- Clade: Embryophytes
- Clade: Tracheophytes
- Clade: Spermatophytes
- Clade: Angiosperms
- Clade: Monocots
- Clade: Commelinids
- Order: Poales
- Family: Bromeliaceae
- Genus: Tillandsia
- Subgenus: Tillandsia subg. Tillandsia
- Species: T. malzinei

Binomial name
- Tillandsia malzinei (É.Morren) Baker

Synonyms
- Vriesea malzinei É.Morren; Vriesea malzinei var. disticha L.B.Sm.

= Tillandsia malzinei =

Species of flowering plant

Tillandsia malzinei is a species of flowering plant in the family Bromeliaceae, native to Mexico. It was first described by Charles Jacques Édouard Morren in 1874 as Vriesea malzinei.
