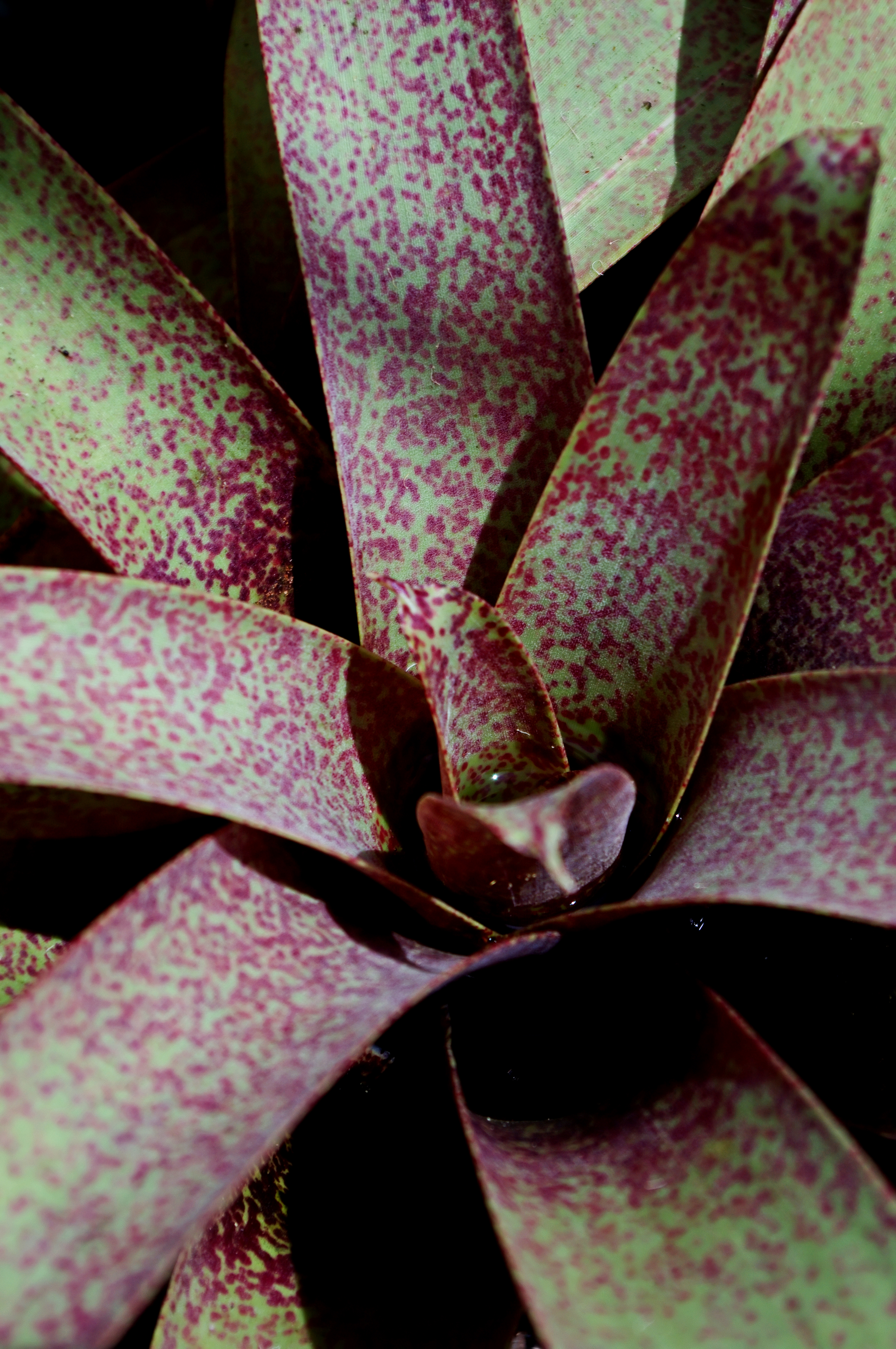

Scientific classification
- Kingdom: Plantae
- Clade: Tracheophytes
- Clade: Angiosperms
- Clade: Monocots
- Clade: Commelinids
- Order: Poales
- Family: Bromeliaceae
- Genus: Vriesea
- Species: V. saundersii

Binomial name
- Vriesea saundersii (Carrière) É.Morren

Synonyms
- Encholirium saundersii Carrière; Tillandsia saundersii (Carrière) K.Koch; Vriesea botafogensis Mez

= Vriesea saundersii =

Species of flowering plant

Vriesea saundersii is a plant species in the genus Vriesea. This species is endemic to Brazil.

== Cultivars ==
Cultivars with some ancestry from V. saundersii include:

- Vriesea 'Administrateur Dehalu'
- Vriesea 'Colonel Marchand'
- Vriesea 'De Willdemaniana'
- Vriesea 'Esperanza'
- Vriesea 'Fair To Middlin'
- Vriesea 'Highway Beauty'
- Vriesea 'Honeycomb'
- Vriesea 'Ingrid'
- Vriesea 'Kitteliana'
- Vriesea 'Morreniano-Saundersii'
- Vriesea 'Pete's First'
- Vriesea 'Rexaundersii'
- Vriesea 'RoRo'
- Vriesea 'Saucy Ruby'
- Vriesea 'Sceptre d'Or'
- Vriesea 'Telstar'
- Vriesea 'Zelia Stoddart'
