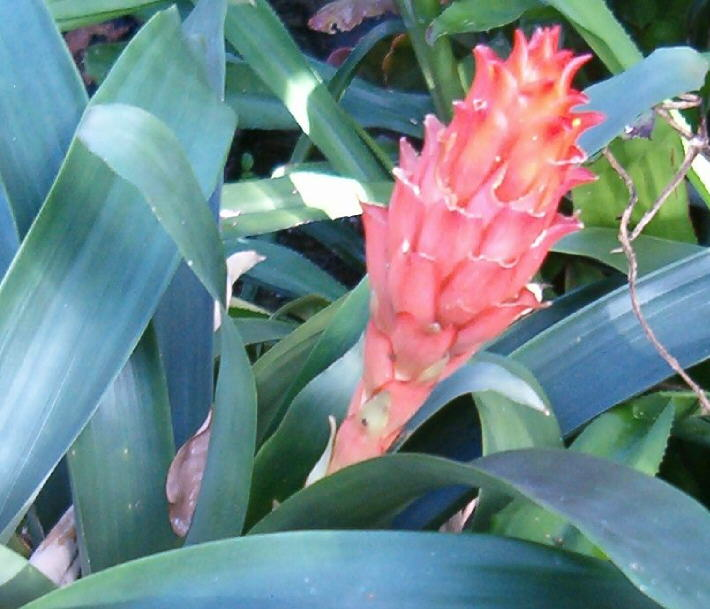

Conservation status
- Endangered (IUCN 3.1)

Scientific classification
- Kingdom: Plantae
- Clade: Tracheophytes
- Clade: Angiosperms
- Clade: Monocots
- Clade: Commelinids
- Order: Poales
- Family: Bromeliaceae
- Genus: Guzmania
- Species: G. osyana

Binomial name
- Guzmania osyana (E.Morren) Mez

Synonyms
- Caraguata magnifica Baker; Caraguata osyana É.Morren (1885); Guzmania recurvobracteata Rauh

= Guzmania osyana =

Species of flowering plant

Guzmania osyana is a species of flowering plant in the family Bromeliaceae. It is an epiphyte endemic to Ecuador. Its natural habitats are subtropical or tropical moist lowland forests and subtropical or tropical moist montane forests. It was last known to be threatened by habitat loss in 2003.

The species was first described as Caraguata osyana by Charles Jacques Édouard Morren in 1885. In 1896 Carl Christian Mez placed the species in genus Guzmania as G. osyana.
