= Guillaume Geefs =

Belgian sculptor (1805–1883)

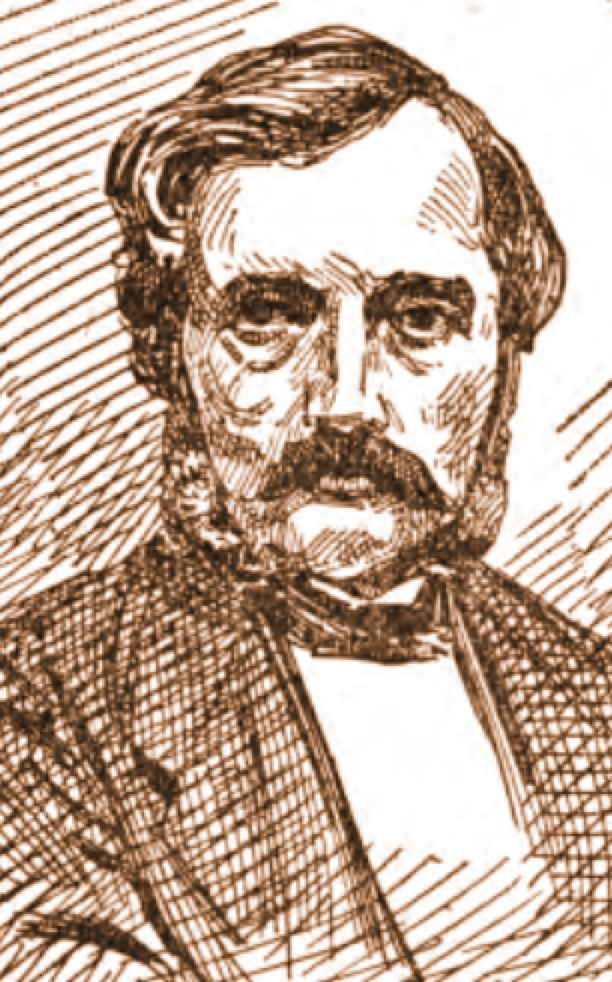
- illustration by Médard Tytgat
- Born: 10 September 1805; Borgerhout, French Empire (modern-day Belgium)
- Died: 19 January 1883 (aged 77); Schaerbeek, Belgium
- Education: Royal Academy of Fine Arts Antwerp and École des Beaux-Arts (Paris)
- Known for: sculpture
- Notable work: Victims of the Revolution (1838); statues, busts, and tomb monuments of statesmen and artists; Le génie du mal
- Movement: synthesis of Late Flemish Baroque, Neoclassicism, Romanticism, Realism
- Spouse: Fanny Geefs (m. 1836)

Guillaume Geefs (10 September 1805 – 19 January 1883), also Willem Geefs, was a Belgian sculptor. Although known primarily for his monumental works and public portraits of statesmen and nationalist figures, he also explored mythological subject matter, often with an erotic theme.

== Life ==
Guillaume Geefs was born in Antwerp, Belgium, the eldest of six brothers in a family of sculptors, the best-known of whom are Joseph Geefs (1808–1885, winner of the Prix de Rome in 1836) and Jean Geefs (1825–1860, and winner of the prize in 1846). Guillaume first studied at the Royal Academy of Fine Arts Antwerp under the late–Flemish Baroque sculptor Jan Frans van Geel and his son, Jan Lodewijk van Geel, who was also a sculptor. He completed his training under Jean-Etienne Ramey at the École des Beaux-Arts in Paris and began exhibiting his work in 1828.

In 1829, Geefs traveled to Italy. When he returned to Antwerp, he began teaching at the art academy. During the 1830s, he executed the colossal work Victims of the Revolution at Brussels, as well as numerous statues and busts. In 1836, he married Isabelle Marie Françoise Corr, a Brussels-born painter of Irish descent known professionally as Fanny Geefs. In the mid-19th century, the sculptor Guillaume-Joseph Charlier was an assistant to him and his brother Joseph.

The Geefs family played a leading role in the craze for public sculpture that followed Belgian independence in the 1830s, producing several propagandistic monuments that emphasized a "historical continuity of the southern Low Countries in the new independent state".

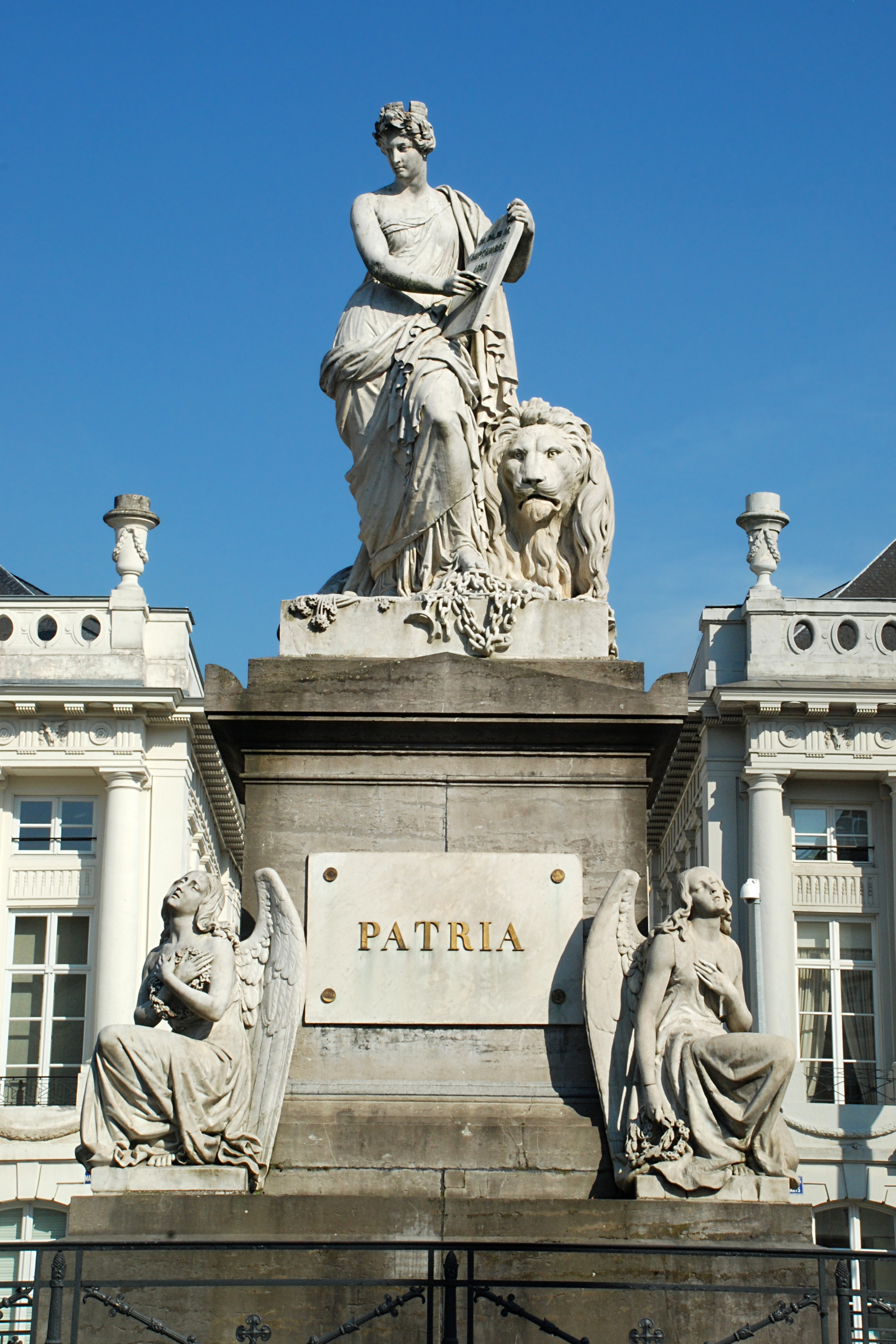
Monument to the Martyrs of the 1830 Revolution

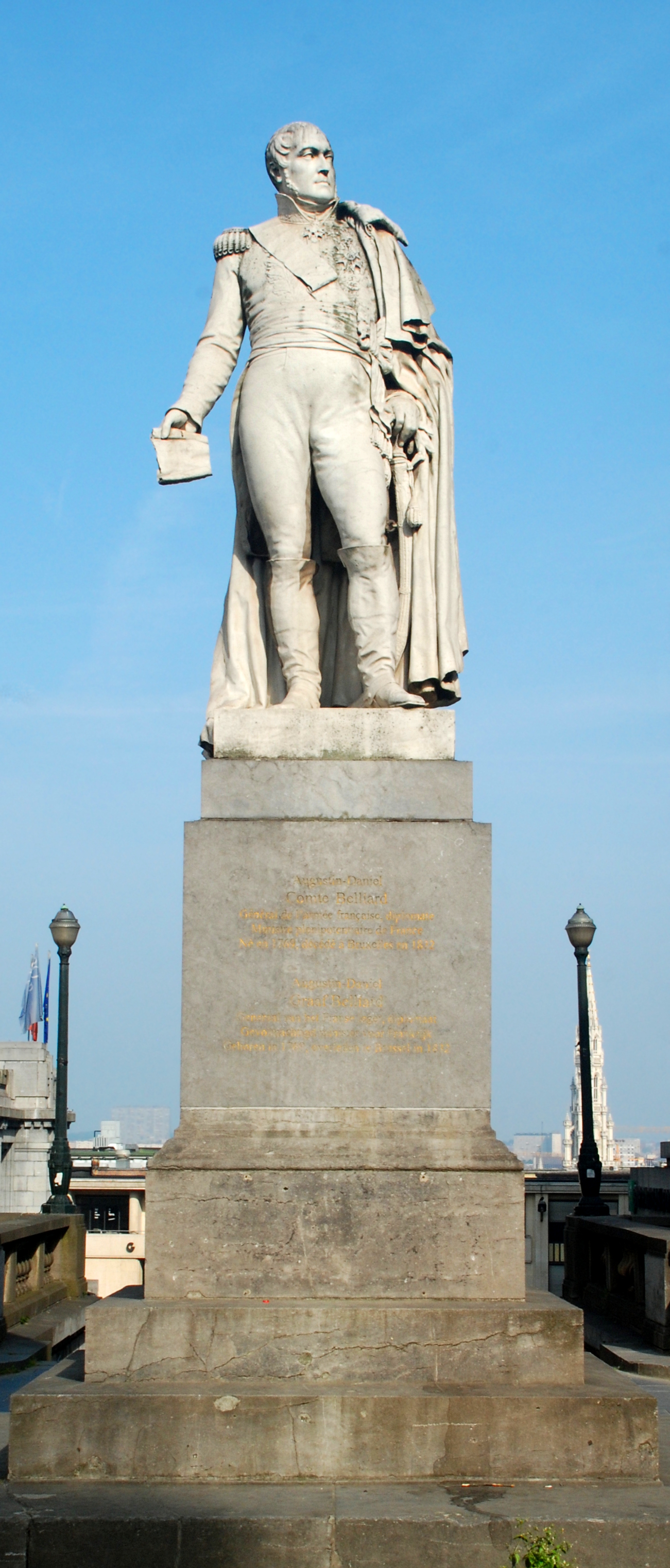
Monument to General Belliard (1838)

== Honours ==
- 1875 : Officer in the Order of Leopold.
- 1881 : Grand Officer in the Order of Leopold.
- Knight of the Order of the Immaculate Conception of Vila Viçosa.
- Knight of the Order of Saint Michael.
- Member of the Royal Academy of Science, Letters and Fine Arts of Belgium.

== As an artist ==
Geefs' early work has been characterized as "predominately elegiac in mood". By the end of the 1830s, however, he developed a powerful, spare realism in monumental works such as General Belliard and Frédéric de Mérode (erected in Brussels, 1836–37) and Peter Paul Rubens (Antwerp, 1841). He was prolific in producing tombs, pulpits, statues, busts, and sculpture groups.

=== Works ===
The works of Guillaume Geefs include:

- Epitaphe of count Jacques Coghen, Belgian Minister of Finance (1831–1832), in Laeken Cemetery
- Epitaphe of Guillaume-Charles de Merode, 4th Prince of Rubempré and Marie-Joseph d'Ognyes; in the Church of the Minimes in Brussels
- Frédéric de Mérode (1833/1837), tomb monument, "noted for its naturalness and lack of idealization"
- General Belliard (1838), on the Rue Baron Horta in Brussels; more than life-size
- Monument to the Martyrs of the 1830 Revolution (1836–38), an allegorical monument commemorating the victims of the Belgian Revolution, on the Place des Martyrs/Martelaarsplein in Brussels
- Leopold I, considered one of the most important works of public art in Belgium in the 19th century; a stamp issued in 1981 commemorates this statue; it may be viewed online
- Treurende Adonis (1839), white marble of Adonis in mourning
- A small sculpture of a young sleeping angel, privately held and not authenticated (but signed by the artist), found in 1993 in an abandoned house in Brussels
- Grétry (1842), bronze statue of the composer, in front of the opera house in Liège
- Le génie du mal, a Lucifer in white marble for the Cathedral of St. Paul in Liège
- Charlemagne (1843), statue in the Basilica of Saint Servatius in Maastricht
- Cenotaph of Saint Hubert of Liège, Basilica of Saint-Hubert (1847)
- The Roman Gladiator, located opposite the M. H. de Young Memorial Museum in San Francisco, to mark the ground-breaking for the 1894 Mid-Winter Exposition
- Le lion amoreux or The Amorous Lion (1851), marble, in the Royal Museums of Fine Arts of Belgium
- Gardel Memorial (1864), a 25-foot pyramid memorial in Mount Vernon Cemetery in Philadelphia, with statues depicting Africa, Asia, Europe, Hope and Faith
- A statue of Isabelle Brunelle (1872) in the garden of the almshouse that she founded in Namur.
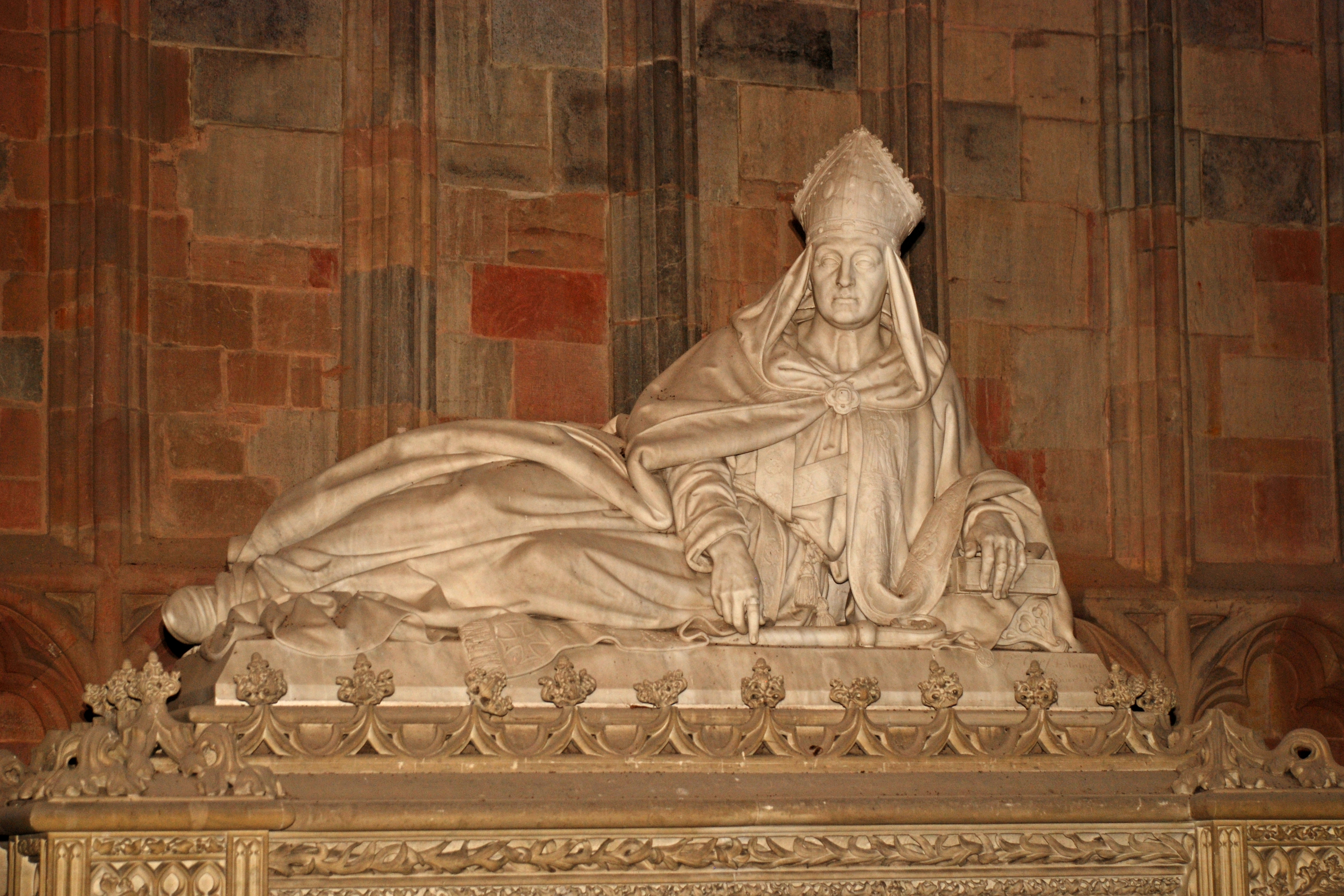
Cenotaph of Saint Hubert of Liège, Basilica of Saint-Hubert (1847)

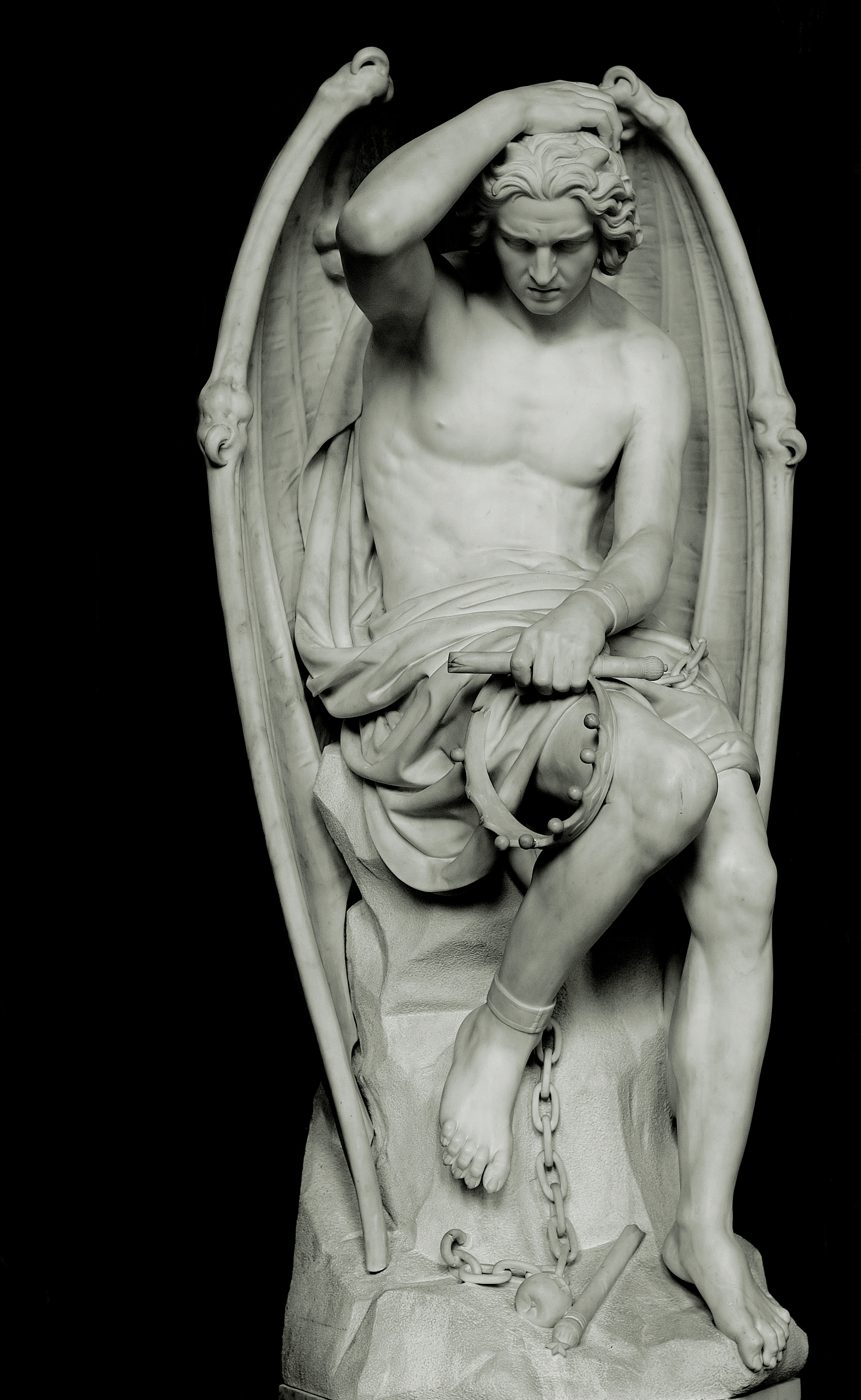
Le génie du mal, Liège (1848)

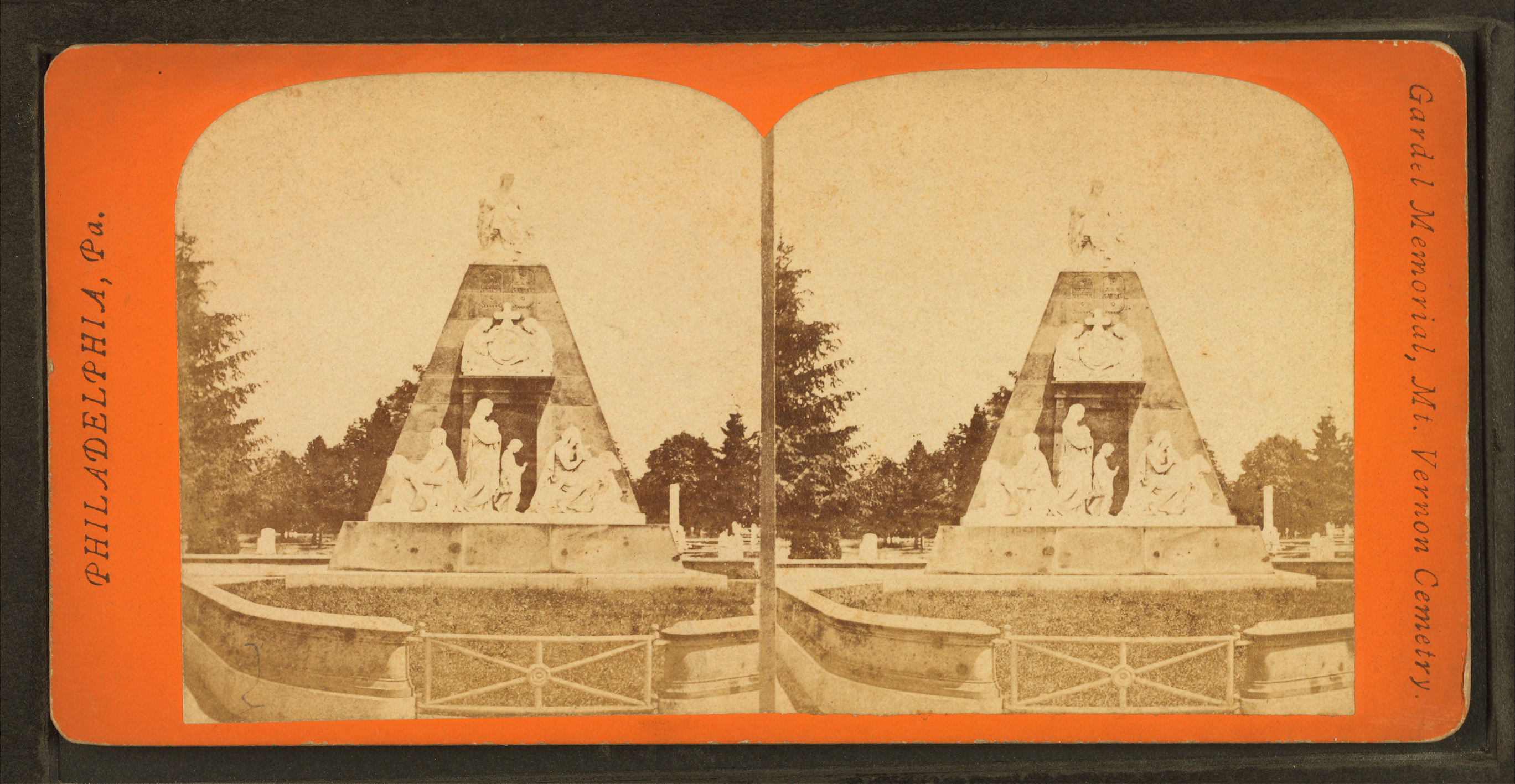
Gardel Memorial in Mount Vernon Cemetery, Philadelphia (1864)

=== Assessment ===
In his lifetime, Geefs' work was considered by some to be marred by "frivolous and inessential" details and "poverty of thought", together with a perceived frigidity of expression in his modelling. He is now regarded as the dominant Belgian sculptor of his time.

He tempered academic stiffness by his flexibility; without being over-bold, he produced natural movements. Yet, he remains, like all the artists of this group, a classicist. These sculptors knew their craft; they had a taste for beautiful forms, but their art was ingenious rather than deeply felt.
