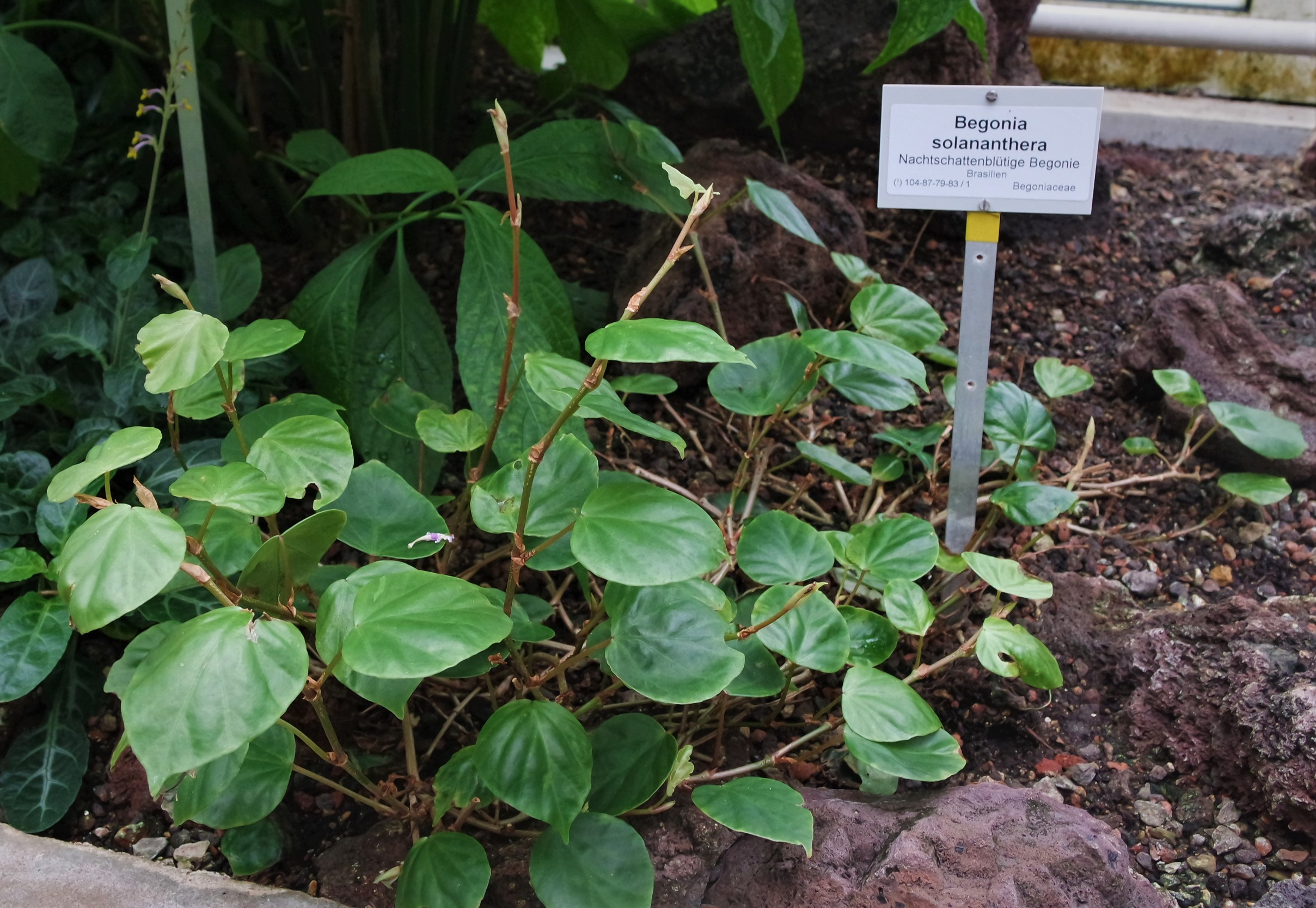

Scientific classification
- Kingdom: Plantae
- Clade: Embryophytes
- Clade: Tracheophytes
- Clade: Spermatophytes
- Clade: Angiosperms
- Clade: Eudicots
- Clade: Rosids
- Order: Cucurbitales
- Family: Begoniaceae
- Genus: Begonia
- Species: B. radicans

Binomial name
- Begonia radicans Vell.

Synonyms
- List: Begonia digwilliana Carrière; Begonia dubia Vell.; Begonia lindeniana Brongn.; Begonia procumbens Vell.; Begonia sandersii A.DC.; Begonia solananthera A.DC.

= Begonia radicans =

Species of flowering plant

Begonia radicans, the Brazilian heart begonia, is a species of flowering plant in the genus Begonia, native to southeastern and southern Brazil. It is an epiphyte with a trailing-scandent growth habit.

== Taxonomy ==
A review of Vellozo’s Flora Fluminensis in 2025 had uncovered that what was known as Begonia solananthera was synonymous with what was originally described as Begonia radicans by Vellozo, and what was known as Begonia radicans had its name misapplied onto a separate species, leading to the formerly defunct name Begonia limmingheiana to be reinstated for it to be assigned to.
