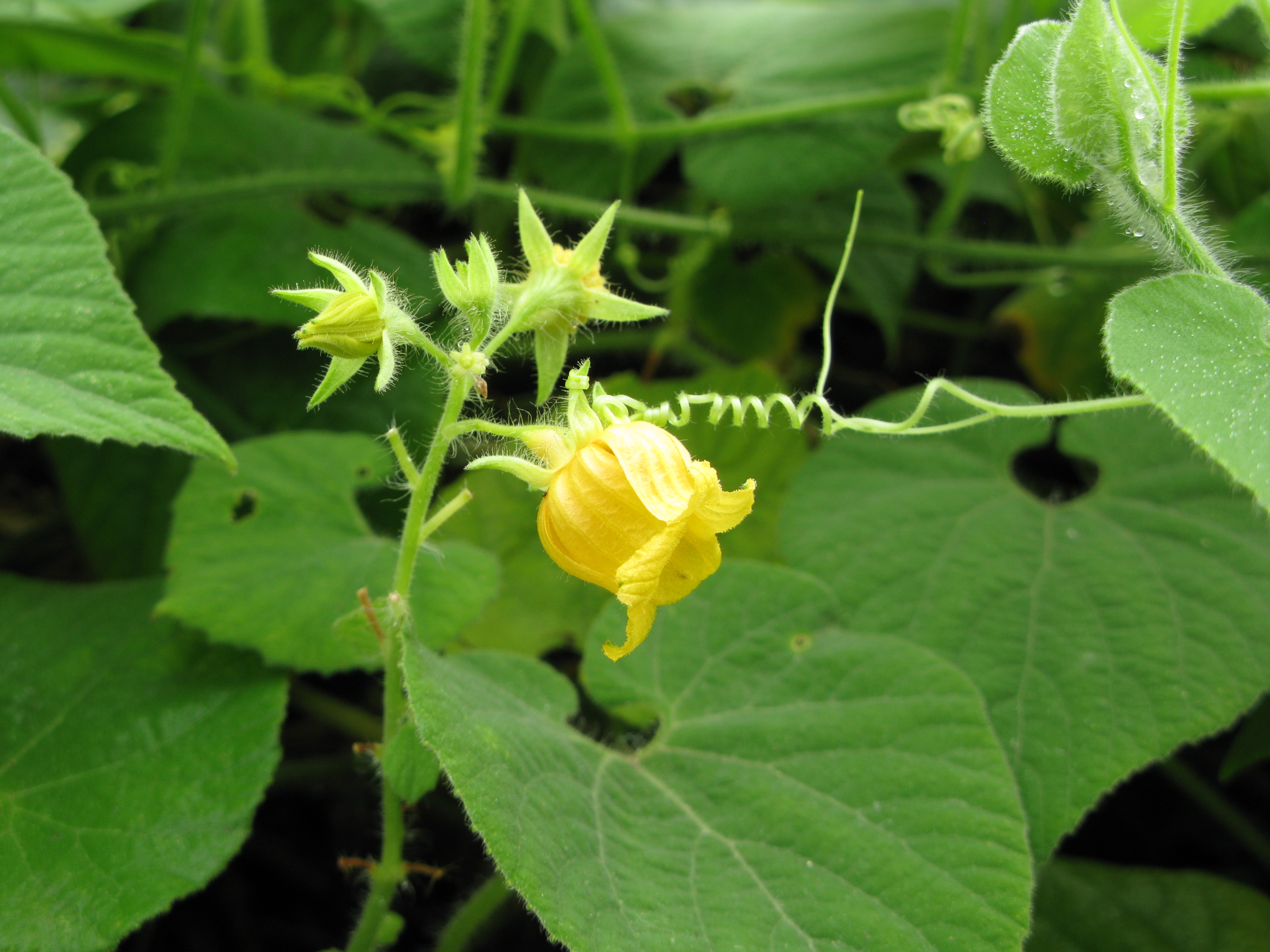
- Thladiantha nudiflora

Scientific classification
- Kingdom: Plantae
- Clade: Tracheophytes
- Clade: Angiosperms
- Clade: Eudicots
- Clade: Rosids
- Order: Cucurbitales
- Family: Cucurbitaceae
- Subfamily: Cucurbitoideae
- Tribe: Thladiantheae
- Genus: Thladiantha; Bunge

Species
- See text

= Thladiantha =

Genus of Cucurbitaceae plants

Thladiantha is a genus of flowering plants in the family Cucurbitaceae, native to the Indian subcontinent, Southeast Asia, and China. They are dioecious, perennial herbs. The best known species is Thladiantha dubia.

== Description ==
Extrafloral nectaries have been reported on T. cordifolia.

== Species ==
Species currently accepted by The Plant List are as follows:

- Thladiantha africana C. Jeffrey → Siraitia africana (C.Jeffrey) A.M.Lu & Zhi Y.Zhang
- Thladiantha capitata Cogn.
- Thladiantha cordifolia (Blume) Cogn.
- Thladiantha davidii Franch.
- Thladiantha dentata Cogn.
- Thladiantha dimorphantha Hand.-Mazz.
- Thladiantha dubia Bunge
- Thladiantha grandisepala A.M. Lu & Zhi Y. Zhang
- Thladiantha henryi Hemsl.
- Thladiantha hookeri C.B.Clarke
- Thladiantha indochinensis Merr.
- Thladiantha lijiangensis A.M. Lu & Zhi Y. Zhang
- Thladiantha longifolia Cogn. ex Oliv.
- Thladiantha longisepala C.Y. Wu
- Thladiantha maculata Cogn.
- Thladiantha medogensis A.M. Lu & J.Q. Li
- Thladiantha montana Cogn.
- Thladiantha nudiflora Hemsl.
- Thladiantha oliveri Cogn. ex Mottet
- Thladiantha palmatipartita A.M. Lu & C. Jeffrey
- Thladiantha punctata Hayata
- Thladiantha pustulata (H. Lév.) C. Jeffrey ex A.M. Lu & Zhi Y. Zhang
- Thladiantha sessilifolia Hand.-Mazz.
- Thladiantha setispina A.M. Lu & Zhi Y. Zhang
- Thladiantha tomentosa (A.M. Lu & Zhi Y. Zhang) W. Jiang & H. Wang
- Thladiantha villosula Cogn.
