= Fanny Geefs =

Belgian painter

- Fanny Geefs, circa 1830
- Born: Isabelle Marie Françoise Corr; 1807
- Died: 1883 (aged 75–76)
- Known for: Painting
- Spouse: Guillaume Geefs (m. 1836)

Fanny Geefs (1807–1883) was a Belgian painter of Irish descent.

== Life and work ==
Born Isabelle Marie Françoise Corr in either Dublin or Brussels, she studied art as a child. In the 1830s, she studied with François-Joseph Navez. As well as portraiture, she painted religious and historical scenes such as Our Lady Appearing to the Oppressed, which hangs in the Church of the Holy Family in Schaerbeek. She married successful sculptor Guillaume Geefs in 1836.

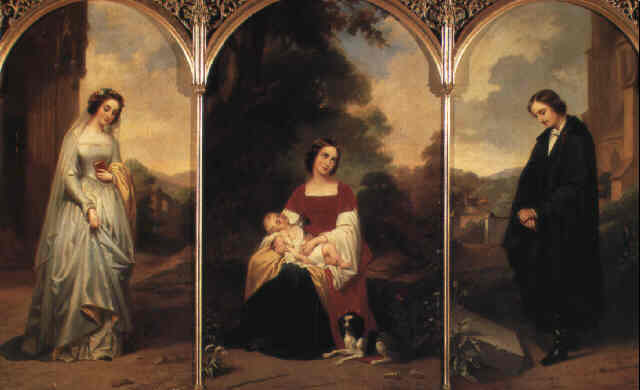
The Life of a Woman: Pity – Love – Sorrow by Geefs

She worked on commissions for the Belgian royal family, including several portraits of Queen Louise-Marie.

Her triptych, La Vie d'Une Femme: La Piété, l'Amour et la Douleur (The Life of a Woman: Pity – Love – Sorrow), was an influence on Charlotte Brontë in her autobiographical novel Villette, set in Brussels.

On her death in 1883, the Royal Library of Belgium purchased a large collection of her works.

She was the sister of Irish engraver Erin Corr.
