= Charles François Antoine Morren =

Belgian botanist (1807–1858)

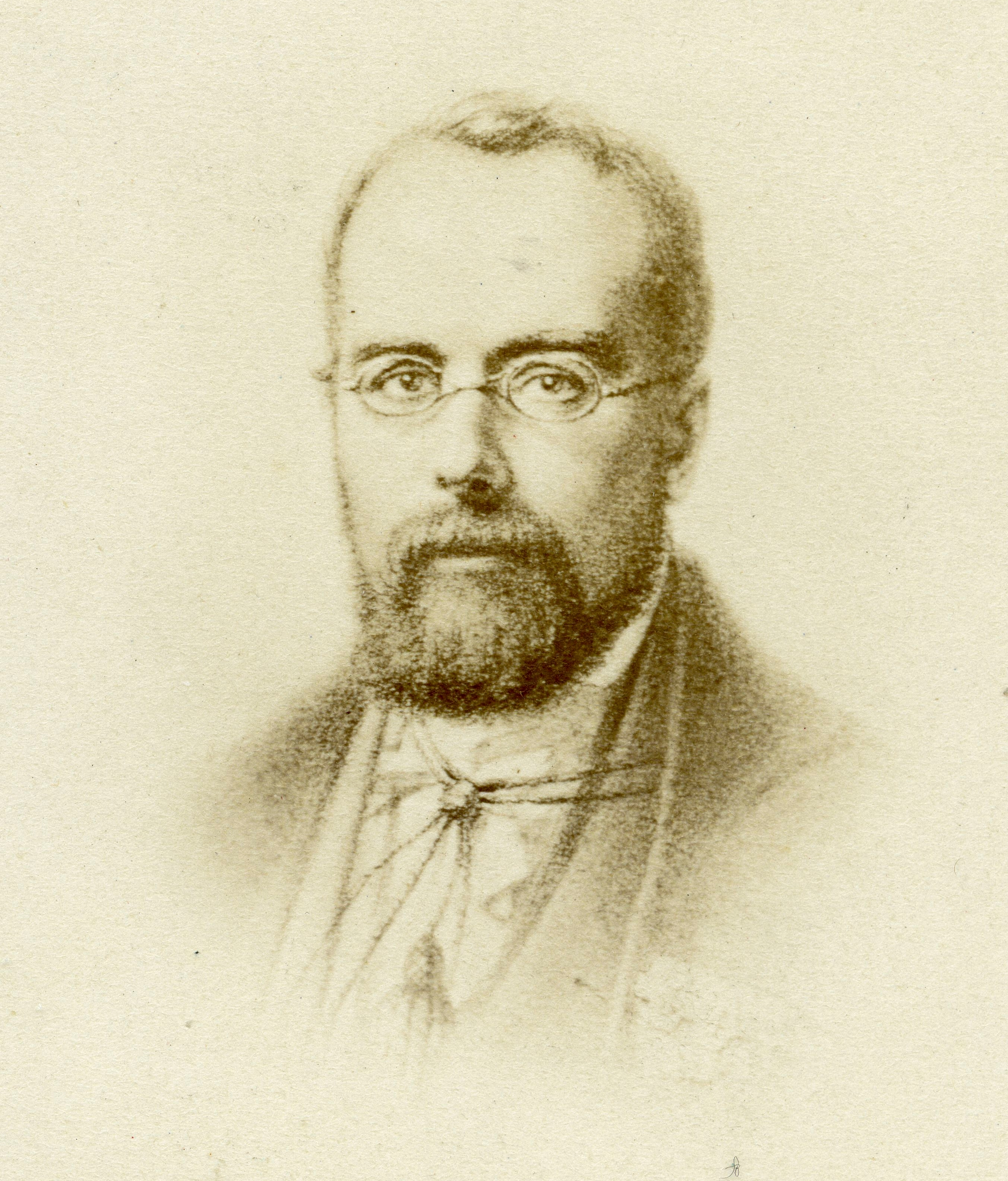

Charles François Antoine Morren (3 March 1807 in Ghent – 17 December 1858 in Liège), was a Belgian botanist and horticulturist, and Director of the Jardin botanique de l'Université de Liège. Morren is credited with introducing the term "phenology" in 1853. His position at the University of Liege was taken up in 1858 by his son Charles Jacques Édouard Morren.

== Life and work ==
Morren was born in Ghent and went to study in Brussels where he was a student of Abbé Van Brabant. He also attended the lectures of Adolphe Quetelet at the Athénée, as well as those by Dekin on natural history, Laisné on chemistry, Jean Kickx (1775–1831) and Pierre-Léonard Vander Linden. He taught physics at Ghent University between 1831 and 1835. At the same time he studied medicine and graduated in 1835. He became Professor extraordinarius of botany at the University of Liège from 1835 to 1837, and full professor from 1837 to 1854.

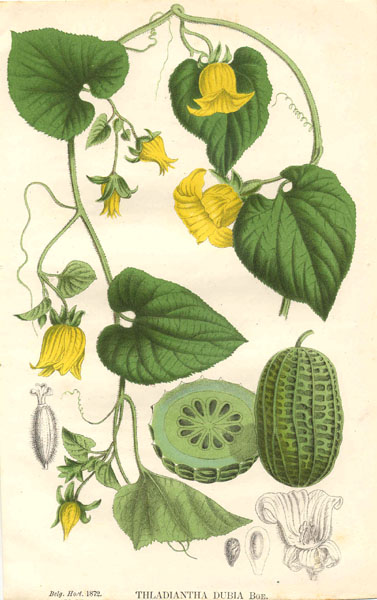
Thladiantha dubia from La Belgique horticole

Pollination of Vanilla orchids is required to make the plants produce the pods from which vanilla extract is obtained. In 1837, Morren was among the first to publish a method for artificial pollination of Vanilla, but his method proved financially unworkable and was not deployed commercially.

Morren was an early promoter of Bordeaux mixture as a fungicide for crops.

Morren also coined the term phenology, which refers to the scientific discipline that studies the seasonal cycles of animals and plants. Quetelet had established a network to observe plant flowering (referred to as anthochronology following Carl Joseph Kreutzer) but Morren was critical of the methodology and critiqued the vagueness of the "period of plant flowering", arguing on the subject for over a decade. Morren first used the term phenology on 16 December 1849 during a public lecture at the Academy of Brussels. The first use of the term phenology in a scientific paper dates back to 1853 when Morren published "Souvenirs phénologiques de l'hiver 1852–1853” ("Phenological memories of the winter 1852–1853”). He created the term from the Greek roots φαίνω, meaning to show, to bring to light, make to appear, and λόγος, meaning study. This paper describes an exceptionally warm winter when plants exhibited unusually phenological patterns.

When he died in 1858, his position was taken over by his son Charles Jacques Édouard Morren. Morren and his son produced the journal La Belgique Horticole (35 volumes, 1851–1885).

This botanist is denoted by the author abbreviation C.Morren when citing a botanical name.

== Publications ==
- Morren, C. (1838). Recherches sur le mouvement et l'anatomie du Stylidium graminifolium. Mem. Acad. Roy. Scien. et belles lett., Brux.
- Morren, C. (1853) Souvenirs phénologiques de l'hiver 1852–1853. Bulletin de l'Académie royale des Sciences, des Lettres et des Beaux-Arts de Belgique. Tome XX, 1e partie, pp. 160–186.
