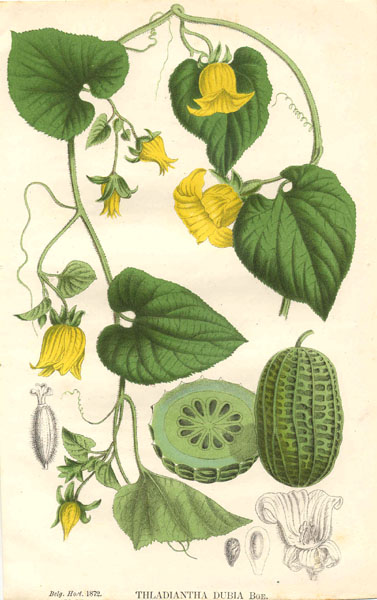

Scientific classification
- Kingdom: Plantae
- Clade: Tracheophytes
- Clade: Angiosperms
- Clade: Eudicots
- Clade: Rosids
- Order: Cucurbitales
- Family: Cucurbitaceae
- Genus: Thladiantha
- Species: T. dubia

Binomial name
- Thladiantha dubia Bunge

= Thladiantha dubia =

Species of flowering plant

Thladiantha dubia, the Manchu tubergourd, goldencreeper, wild potato, red hailstone, or (French) thladianthe douteuse, is a herbaceous perennial climbing vine of the gourd family. It is native to Russia, northern China, and Korea, but has been introduced to Japan, southeast Europe (Austria, Romania, Germany), the Galapagos Islands, and scattered locations in North America (Manitoba, Ontario, Quebec, Connecticut, Illinois, Massachusetts, Minnesota, New Hampshire, New York, Wisconsin). It is occasionally grown as a medicinal plant, or as an ornamental in North America (the US and Canada).

Like other members of the genus, it is dioecious. It grows from a tuber and spreads vegetatively by sending out underground rhizomes that produce new tubers.
