= Médard Tytgat =

Belgian artist

Médard Tytgat (8 February 1871 – 11 January 1948) was a Belgian painter, lithographer, book illustrator and poster artist known for portraits, nudes, and landscapes. He was born in Bruges. From 1890 to 1894, he studied at the Académie Royale des Beaux-Arts of Brussels with Jean-François Portaels. He took part in the art competitions at the 1924 Summer Olympics. He died in Brussels.

Tytgat was considered a mediocre painter, but was more highly regarded as an illustrator. His younger brother, Edgard Tytgat, was also an artist. A grandson, Médard-Siegfried Tytgat (1916–1997), was a painter.
