= Joseph Geefs =

Belgian sculptor

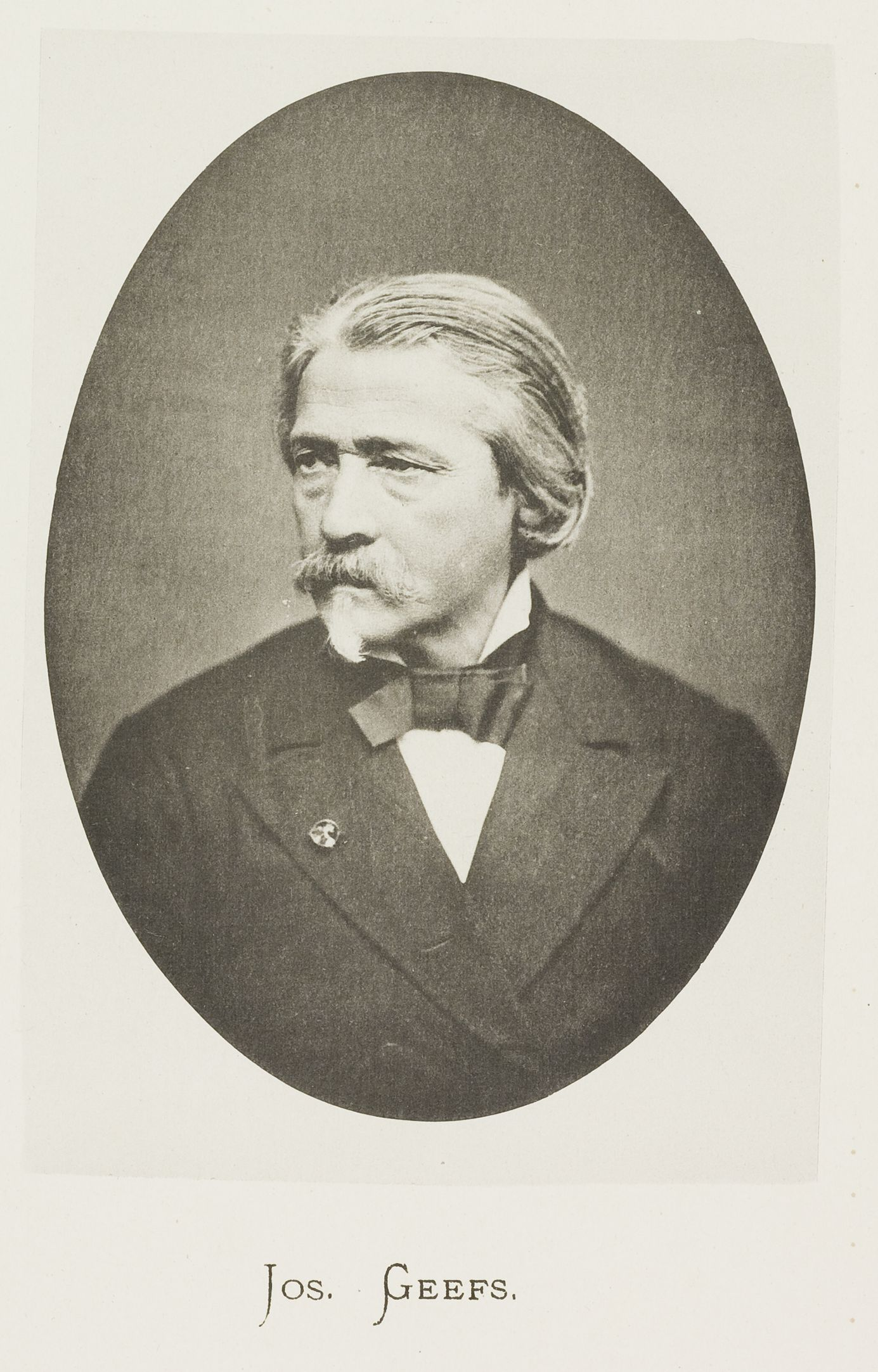
Joseph Geefs

Joseph Germain Geefs or Jozef Germain Geefs (23 December 1808 – 9 October 1885) was a Belgian sculptor. Also his six brothers Guillaume Geefs, Aloys Geefs, Jean Geefs, Théodore Geefs, Charles Geefs and Alexandre Geefs were sculptors.

== Life ==
Joseph Geefs was born in Antwerp, where he studied at the Royal Academy of Fine Arts, going on to École des Beaux-Arts de Paris and winning the Prix de Rome in 1836. In 1841, he became a lecturer in sculpture and anatomy at the Academy in Antwerp (his pupils included Bart van Hove and Jef Lambeaux), rising to be its director in 1876. He was made an officer of the Order of Leopold in 1859 by King Leopold I.

Geefs married a daughter of the architect Lodewijk Roelandt and probably produced the portrait medallion on his gravestone. Geefs died in Antwerp, aged 76, and was buried in Berchem.

== Honours ==
- 1881: Grand Officer in the Order of Leopold.
- Knight Commander of the Order of the White Falcon.
- Officer in the Order of the Oak Crown.
- Officer in the Order of the Zähringer Lion.
- Knight in the Order of the Immaculate Conception of Vila Viçosa.

== Selected works ==
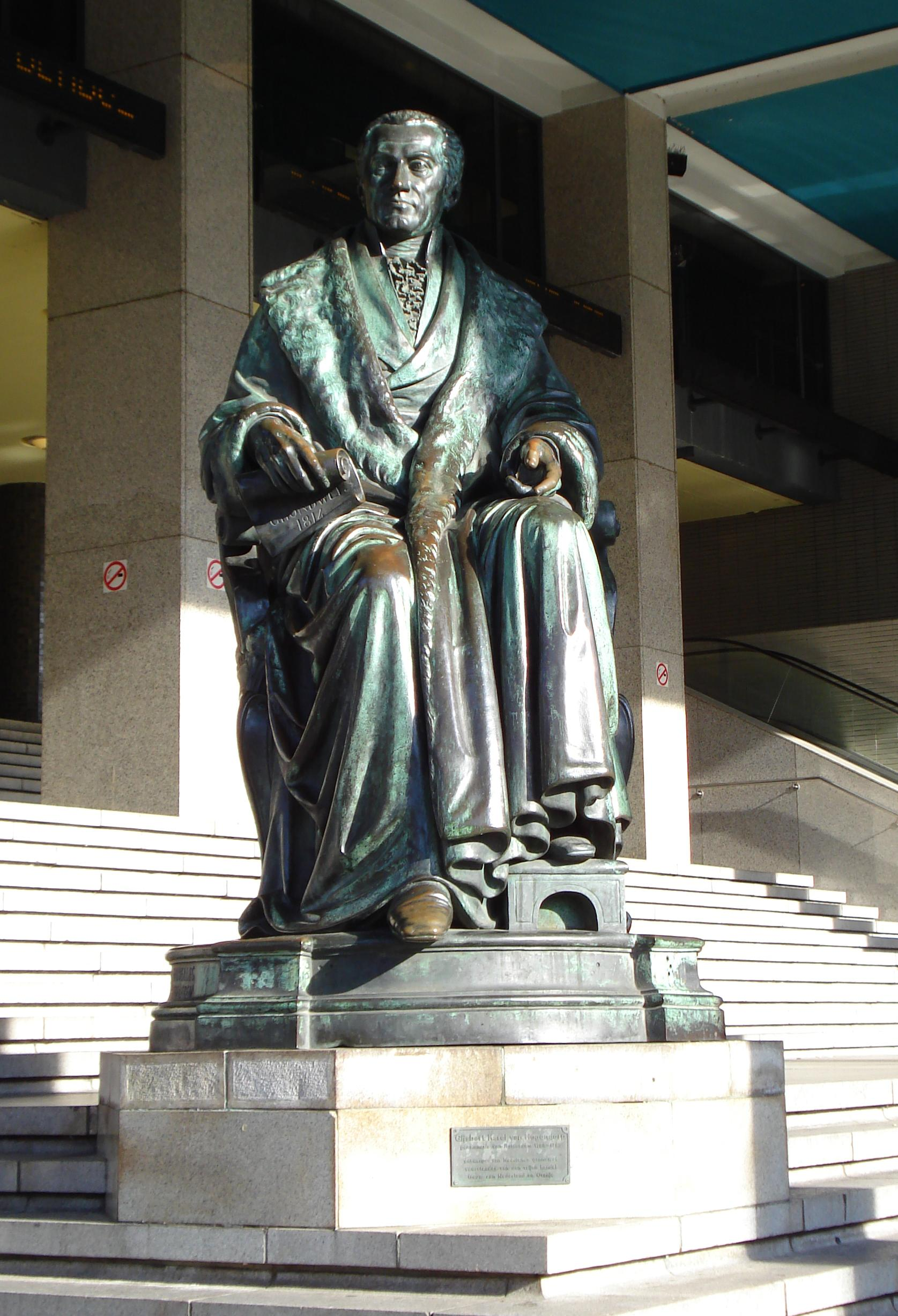
Statue of Gijsbert Van Hogendorp by Josef Geefs (1867)

=== Belgium ===
==== Antwerp ====
- Indian rider attacked by two jaguars (1869) and Hunter with booty, in Antwerp Zoo
- Equestrian statue of Leopold I of Belgium, in Leopoldstraat (1872)

==== Brussels ====
- L'ange du Mal (The Angel of Evil), Royal Museums of Fine Arts of Belgium

==== Mechelen ====
- Stations of the cross (1867) and images (1867–1871) in Saints Peter and Paul Church

=== Netherlands ===
==== Heiligerlee ====
- Monument to Adolf van Nassau (1873), to a design by Johannes Hinderikus Egenberger

==== Rotterdam ====
- Gijsbert Karel van Hogendorp (1867), Coolsingel

==== Tilburg ====
- Portrait medallion of William II of the Netherlands on an obelisk (1874)
