= Charles Jacques Édouard Morren =

Belgian botanist (1833–1886)

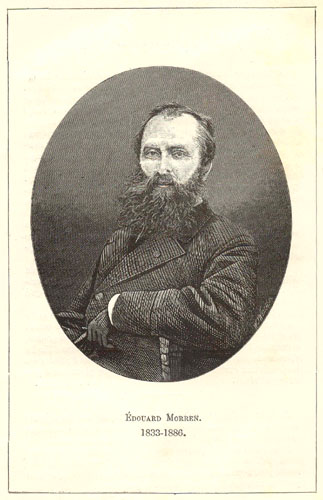
- Born: 2 December 1833; Ghent, Belgium
- Died: 22 June 1929 (aged 96); Liège, Belgium
- Scientific career
- Fields: Botany
- Institutions: University of Liège Botanical Garden
- Author abbrev. (botany): E.Morren

Charles Jacques Édouard Morren (2 December 1833 – 28 February 1886) was a Belgian botanist, professor of botany and director of the Jardin botanique de l'Université de Liège from 1857 to 1886. His special field of study was the Bromeliaceae on which family he was the recognized authority. He was the son of Charles François Antoine Morren.

He was editor of the journal La Belgique Horticole in which he published descriptions of numerous new species. He was working on a monograph of the Bromeliaceae when death intervened at a relatively youthful 53 years. His manuscripts and commissioned watercolor plates were sold to Kew Gardens by his widow shortly after his death and examined by John Gilbert Baker and Carl Christian Mez, who described numerous unpublished new species. Baker made extensive use of these paintings in the preparation of his Handbook of the Bromeliaceae which was published in 1889.

Morren employed four artists to work on the plates - Marie Jean Guillaume Cambresier, R. Sartorius, Francois Stroobant (1819–1916) and François De Tollenaere. Their style later heavily influenced Margaret Mee's paintings.

== Bibliography ==
Brummitt, R. K.; C. E. Powell (1992). Authors of Plant Names. Royal Botanic Gardens, Kew. ISBN 1-84246-085-4.
