= Hendrik Frans de Cort =

Flemish painter (1742–1810)

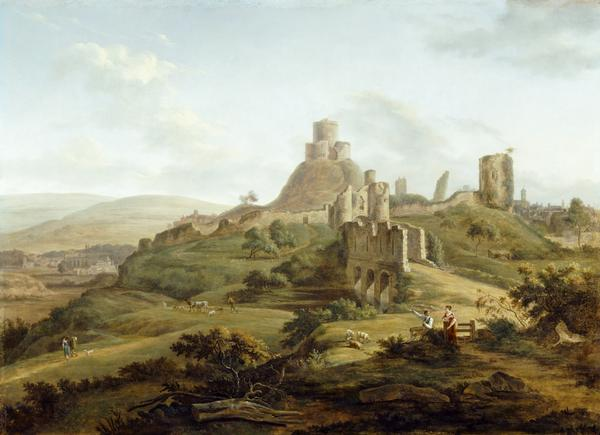
Launceston Castle, Cornwall

Hendrik de Cort or Hendrik Frans de Cort (1742 in Antwerp – 28 June 1810 in London) was a Flemish landscape painter and draughtsman. His international career brought him to Antwerp, Paris, England and Wales. He is mainly remembered for his topographical paintings and drawings of English castles, country houses, parks and ruins.

== Life ==
Hendrik de Cort studied in Antwerp under Henricus Josephus Antonissen and Willem Jacob Herreyns. In 1770 he became a master in the Antwerp Guild of Saint Luke. When Archduke Maximilian Francis of Austria travelled through the Austrian Netherlands in 1774 he appointed de Cort as his personal painter, possibly at the urging of Prince Charles Alexander of Lorraine, the then governor of the Austrian Netherlands.

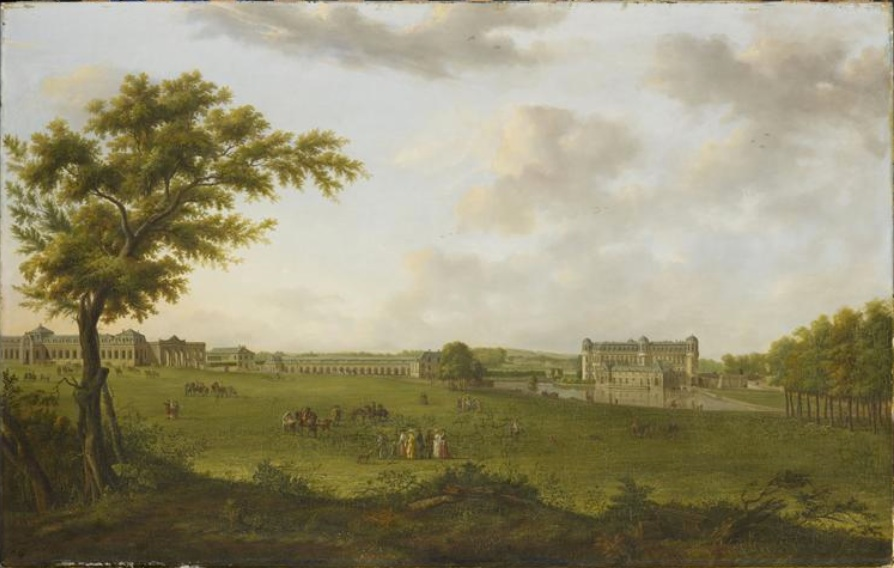
Chantilly in 1781, View from the Lawn

He moved to Paris after 1776. He was received (reçu) into the Académie royale de peinture et de sculpture in 1779. He became the ‘ordinary’ painter to Louis Joseph, Prince of Condé for whom in 1781 he painted topographical views of the Château de Chantilly.

De Cort returned to Antwerp in 1782. Here he was one of the founders in 1788 of a society of artists known as the Genootschap ter aanmoediging der Schoone Kunsten, known under its short form as the Konstmaatschappij (the 'Art Society'). Other founders included Balthasar Paul Ommeganck, Pieter Faes, Miss Herry, Jan Josef Horemans the Younger, Ferdinand Verhoeven, Hendrik Aarnout Myin, Frans Balthazar Solvyns, Mattheus Ignatius van Bree, Maria Jacoba Ommeganck, Marten Waefelaerts and many others. The purpose of the society was the promotion and appreciation of the artworks of its various members in an informal setting.

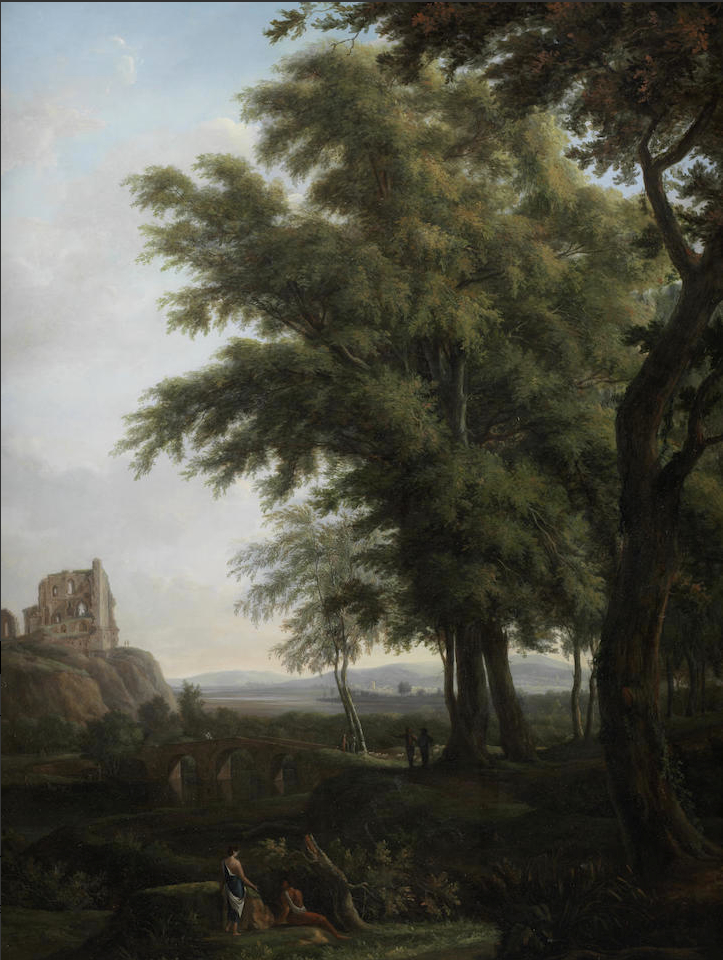
Figures in a classical landscape, with Chepstow Castle on the horizon

De Cort would not remain a member of the society for long as he left Flanders after the Brabant Revolution of 1789. He settled in London c. 1790 and remained in England for the rest of his life. There he built up a highly successful practice as a painter of country houses, castles, cathedrals and other views. He gained many commissions from the nobility and other important patrons. He thus stood in a long tradition of Flemish painters who made topographical paintings of the estates of the British nobility, which includes artists such as Jan Siberechts, Peter Tillemans and Pieter Andreas Rijsbrack. Many of his works were exhibited at the Royal Academy and the British Institution between 1790 and 1806.

He died in London.

== Work ==
De Cort's work consists solely of landscape and topographical paintings and drawings. His early landscapes from the time before he moved to England were often made in collaboration with other Flemish artists such as Balthasar Paul Ommeganck and Petrus Johannes van Regemorter who painted the figures and animals.

De Cort is known for his topographical views of English and Welsh landscapes. These were painted in an Italianate idiom indebted to the style of Gaspar Dughet. He often painted on specially prepared mahogany panels. His style was described by the painter Joseph Farington as follows: 'his ground prepared light, this to draw his outline with black lead pencil, then to pass oil over it, and on that tint to glaze his shadows and embody his lights'. Some traces of under drawing and pentimenti are visible in this work.’

He would adjust some of the details of his landscape subjects for maximum effect. For instance, in his Launceston Castle, Cornwall he painted the main towers and buildings as protruding from behind, even where they would not normally have been visible from this viewpoint.

To complete his many commissions de Cort travelled far and wide and made many preparatory wash drawings. A number of these are in the collections of the British Museum and the Ashmolean Museum. The collection of the Stedelijk Prentenkabinet (Municipal Cabinet of Prints) of the Plantin-Moretus Museum in Antwerp holds a sketch book of de Cort containing mainly drawings of castles from the time he was still residing in his home country.
