= Pieter Faes =

Flemish painter (1750–1814)

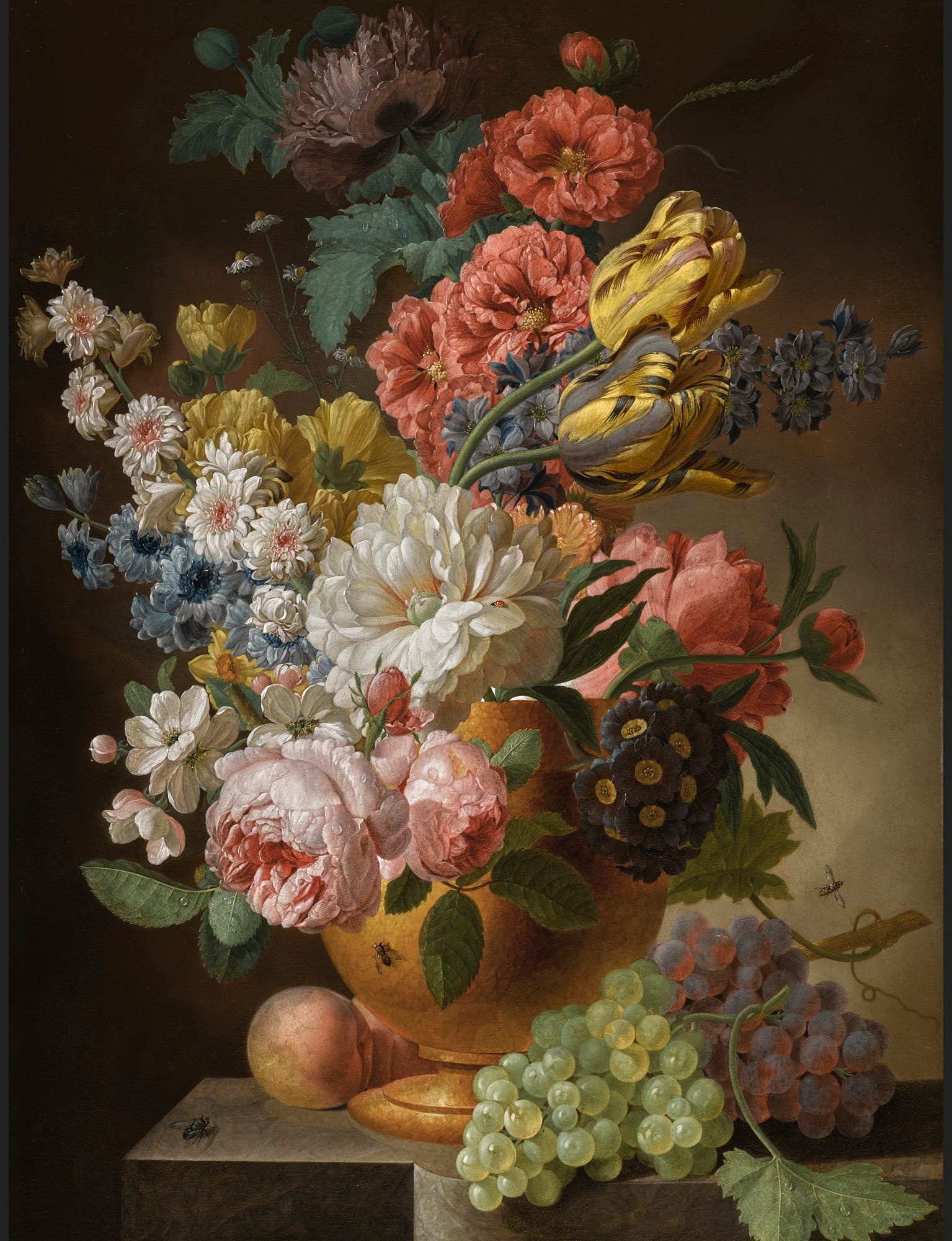
Still life of flowers in an urn on a stone ledge, with peaches and grapes

Pieter Faes or Peeter Faes (14 July 1750 – 22 December 1814) was a Flemish painter of still lifes of flowers and fruit. He worked in a decorative style close to that of Jan van Huysum.

== Life ==
He was born in the village of Meer (now part of Hoogstraten, it was then part of the Austrian Netherlands). He studied at the Academy of Antwerp. At the academy he became acquainted with Georges Frédéric Ziesel and Jan Frans Eliaerts who specialised in flower pieces like him.

He was one of the founders in 1788 of a society of artists known as the Konstmaatschappij (the 'Art Society'). Other founders included Hendrik Frans de Cort, Balthasar Paul Ommeganck, Willem Schaeken, Antoon Herry, Jan Josef Horemans the Younger, Bartholomeus Jan van Hulst, Jan Baptist Beguinet, Hendrik Aarnout Myin, Hendrik Blomaert, Frans Balthasar Solvyns, Ignatius Jozef van den Berghe, Godfried Frans Bex and the amateur A. Renodi. The first exhibition of the society was held in Antwerp in 1789. Faes exhibited two flower pieces at this exhibition. Faes was actively involved in the management of the Konstmaatschappij and helped locate premises for it. Other artists including Mattheus Ignatius van Bree, Maria Jacoba Ommeganck, Marten Waefelaerts and many others later joined the Konstmaatschappij. At the end of 1800 the pre-existing artist organisation Konstmaatschappij was merged with the newly established Genootschap der Kunsten. The merged organisation held meetings so members could discuss each other's works, invited older artists to train the younger generation and organised an annual exhibition of its members' works.

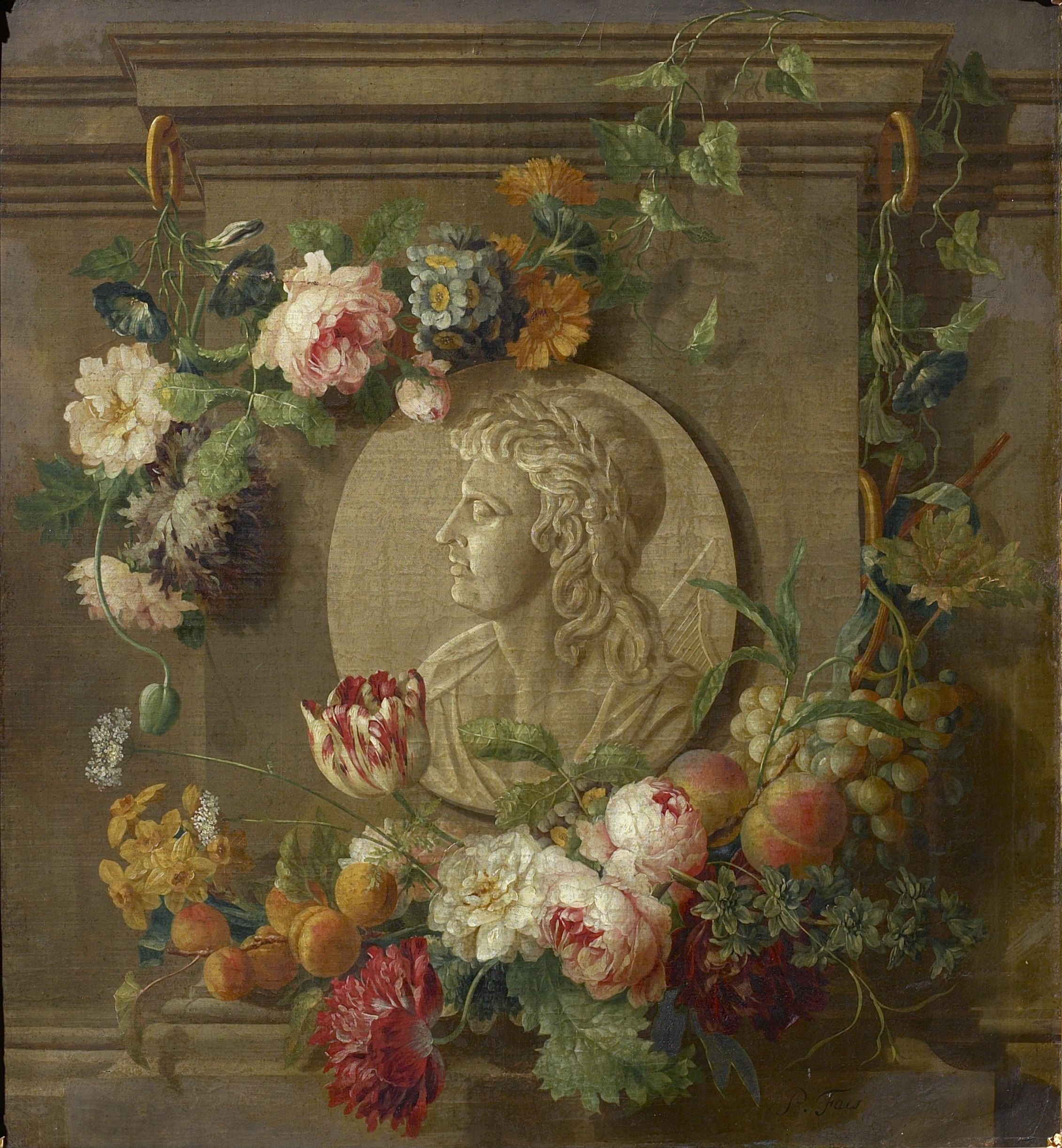
Medallion with Apollo surrounded by fruits and flowers

His work was very well received and his patrons included Maria Christina, the joint regent of the Austrian Netherlands. She took many of his paintings back to Vienna upon her return.

Through marriage he was linked to the Antwerp neo-classicist painter Andries Cornelis Lens. He died in Antwerp.

== Work ==
His work continued the manner of painting flowers and fruit of Jan van Huysum. His paintings show a fine touch and a harmonious palette. He worked in the decorative style of the Antwerp flower artists who worked in Paris such as Jan Frans van Dael and Jan Frans Eliaerts. His style was polished but dry.

His flower paintings served as models for the Flemish painter Jean-Baptiste Berré.
