= Jan Josef Horemans the Younger =

Flemish painter (1714–1792)

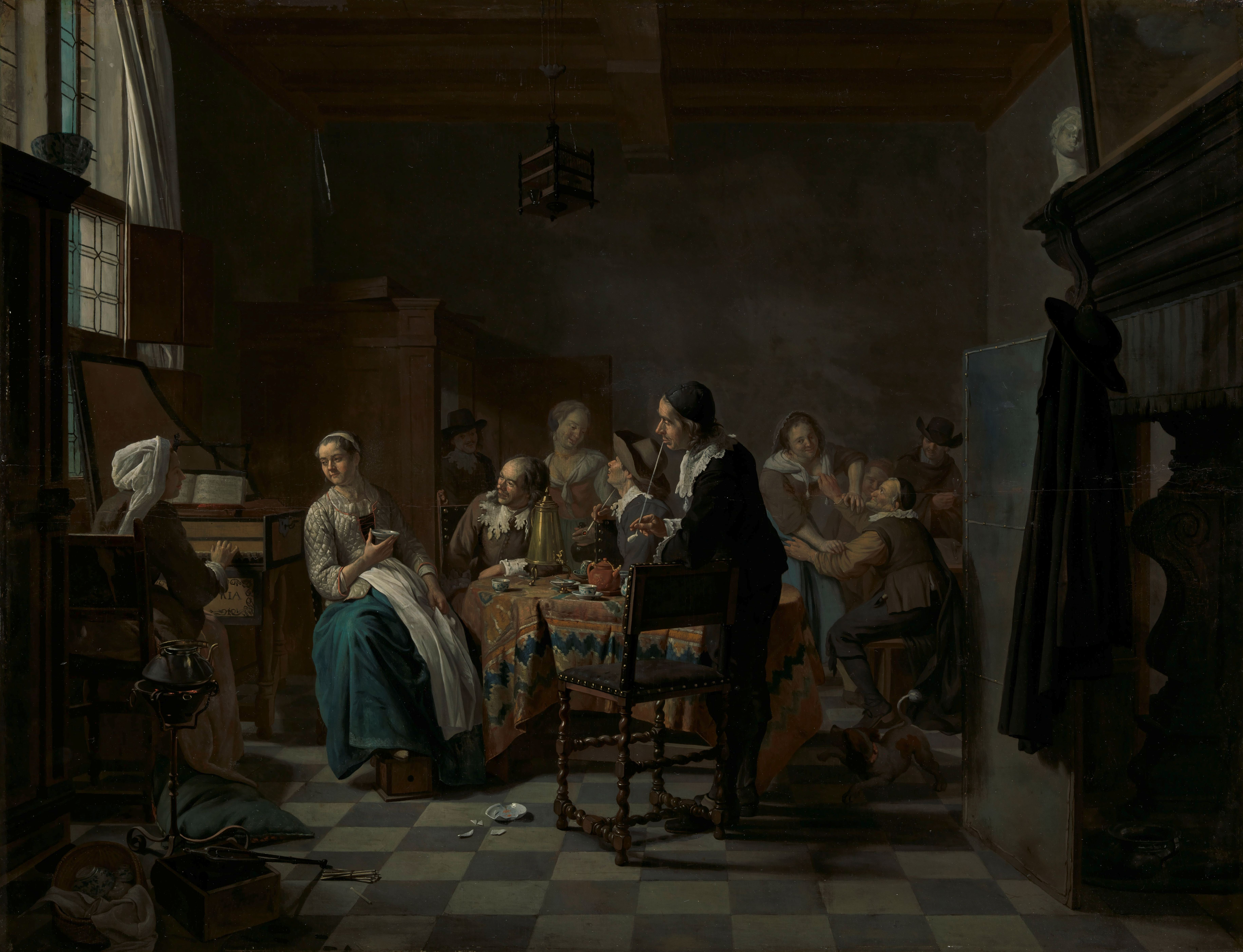
The new song

Jan Josef Horemans the Younger (baptised 15 January 1714 – 9 February 1792) was an 18th-century Flemish painter. He is mainly known for his genre scenes but also painted harbor views, equestrian paintings, portraits and still lifes.

== Life ==
Jan Josef Horemans the Younger was born in Antwerp as the son of Jan Josef Horemans the Elder and Maria-Fransisca van der Voort. He was likely a pupil of his father, a prolific genre painter.

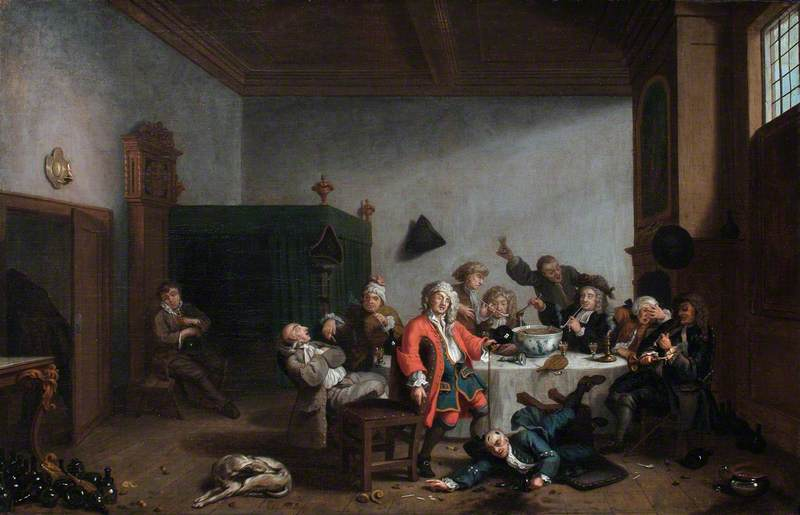
A merry party

Jan Josef Horemans became a master of the Guild of St Luke in Antwerp on 10 February 1767 and was dean of the Guild on two occasions (1768–9 and 1775–6). He was also a member of the Antwerp Academy.

In 1788 he was the co-founder of a society of artists known as the Genootschap ter aanmoediging der Schoone Kunsten ("Society for the encouragement of the fine arts'), known under its short form as the Konstmaatschappij (the 'Art Society'). Other founders included Hendrik Frans de Cort, Pieter Faes, Miss Herry, Balthasar Paul Ommeganck, Ferdinand Verhoeven, Hendrik Aarnout Myin, Frans Balthasar Solvyns, Mattheus Ignatius van Bree, Maria Jacoba Ommeganck, Marten Waefelaerts and many others. The society's goal was to provide opportunities for the promotion and appreciation of the artworks of its various members in an informal setting. The first exhibition of the society was held in Antwerp in 1789. Horemans resigned as a member on 10 October 1791.

He was the teacher of Johan Herman Faber. He died in Antwerp.

== Work ==
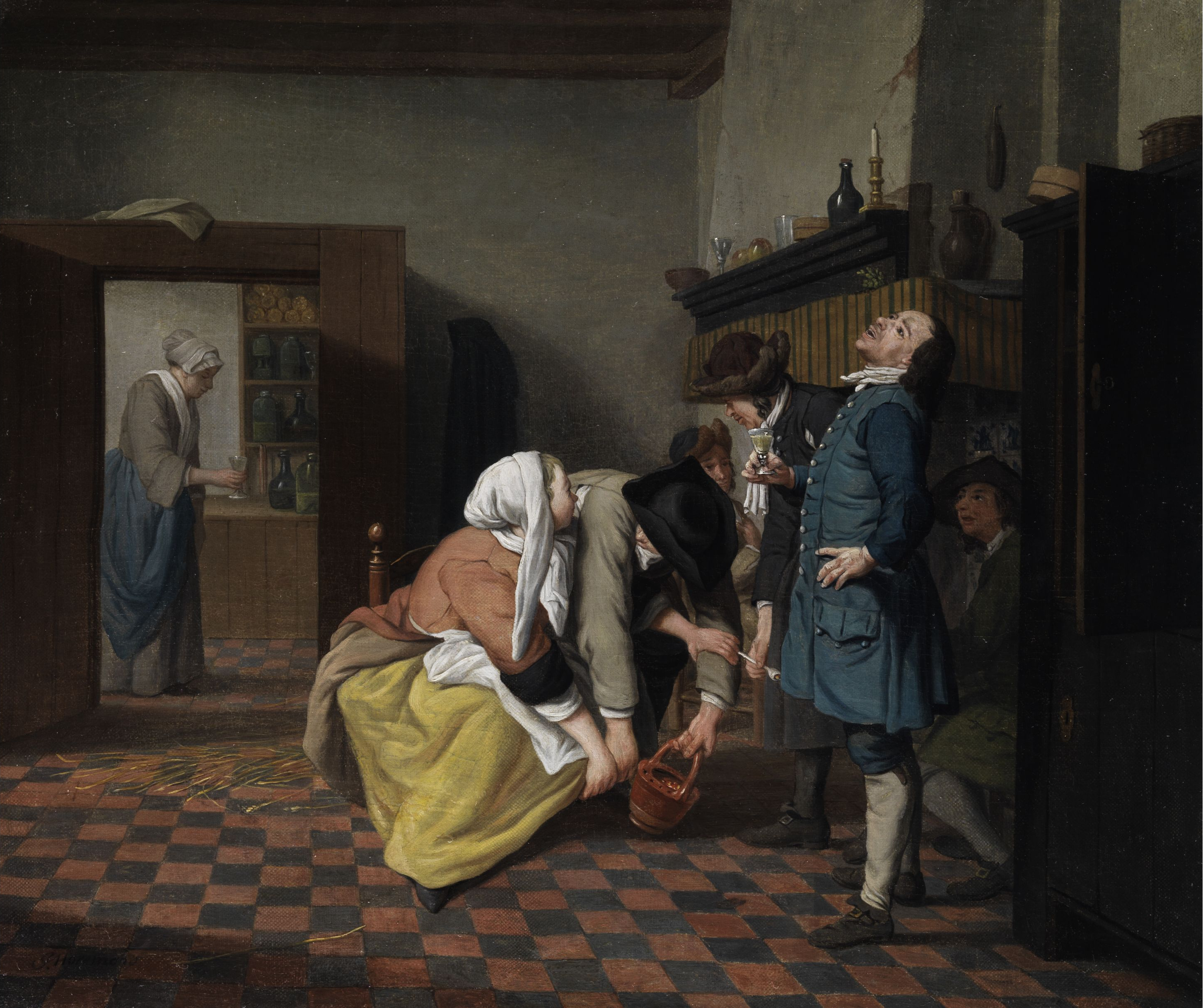
The smoking prohibition

Jan Josef Horemans was a flexible artist who painted genre scenes, harbor views, equestrian paintings, portraits and still lifes.

Most typical are his interior scenes but he also painted a number of scenes of vendors selling their wares. Characteristic of his works are the sharply delineated figures.

His genre scenes are regarded as promoting bourgeois virtues. Continuing in the steps of his father he recreated the atmosphere of his age in a multitude of small paintings that are pleasantly animated and have an old-fashioned charm. He also signed in the same way as his father, but his style was more distinguished and sensitive. His lighter palette earned him the nickname 'le clair'.
