= Frans Balthazar Solvyns =

Belgian painter, brought print-making to India (1760–1824)

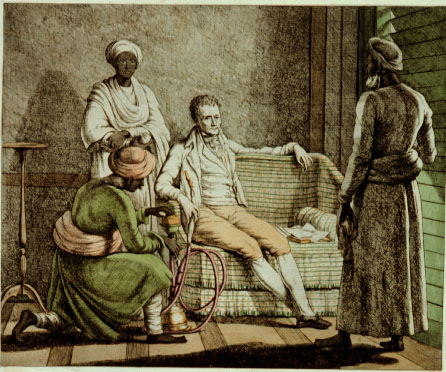
Self-portrait

Frans Balthazar Solvyns or François Balt(h)azar(d) (6 July 1760 – 10 October 1824) was a Flemish marine painter, printmaker and ethnographer. While living and working in India from 1791 to 1803, he made many drawings of the manners and customs of the Indians, especially of Calcutta, which he later etched and published. He is, along with Thomas Daniell, considered one of the early pioneers in the field of print-making in India.

His collection of etchings provide a portrait of Calcutta's 18th century history, and the people and customs of Bengal. His encyclopaedic and systematic approach made him a pioneer of the systematic ethnography of the Indian population. His work had an important influence on 19th century Indian painting.

== Life ==
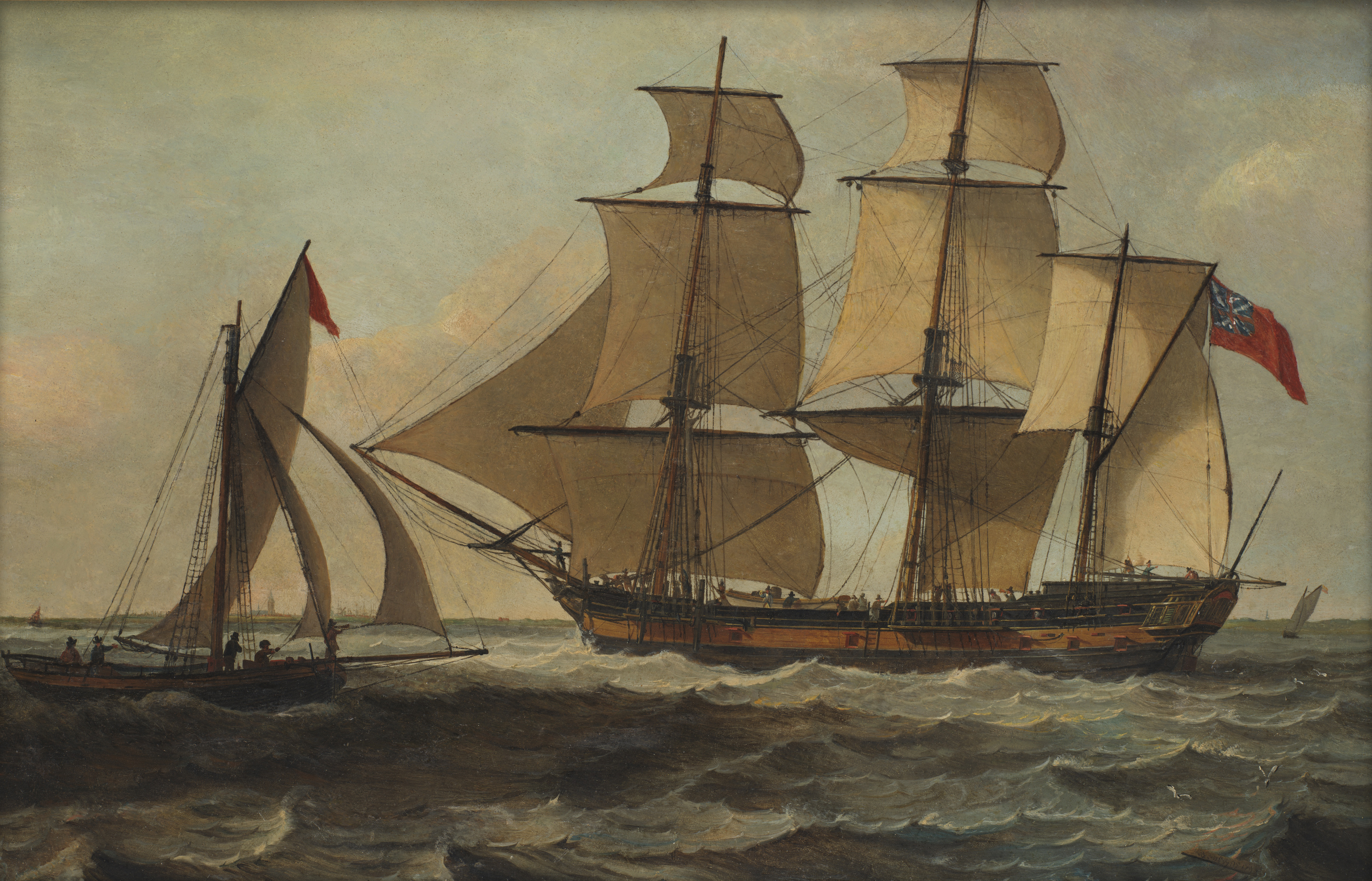
Portrait of Il Netunno, later Marquis Cornwallis

Solvyns was born in Antwerp in 1760 as the son of Maximiliaan (Maximilianus) Solvyns, a merchant, and Maria Elisabeth Abeloos. He studied from 1775 to 1778 at the Academy of Fine Arts in Antwerp under the guidance of Andreas Bernardus de Quertenmont. On 30 April 1778 he enrolled in Paris at the Ecole de l'Académie royale de peinture et de sculpture.

He pursued a career as a marine painter. His work as a painter and graphic artist enjoyed the appreciation of the Austrian governor-general at the court in Brussels. This led to government commissions to paint harbour views, including paintings of Antwerp shipping companies. The government's appreciation was also reflected in his appointment - at the age of sixteen - as captain of Fort Lillo on the left bank of the river Scheldt in Antwerp. Maria Christina, Duchess of Teschen, wife of the governor general of the Austrian Netherlands Albert Casimir, Duke of Teschen, particularly favoured him. Thanks to her intervention, he was appointed captain of Laken Castle, the residence of the governor general near Brussels. As his appointment was purely honorary, Solvyns was free to pursue his artistic career. He was commissioned by the government to make a large painting of the port of Ostend. The painting was successful and was soon copied and widely distributed through the print he asked the Frenchman Robert Daudet to make after the painting. The governor general commissioned him to make a painting of the city and port of Antwerp depicting the occasion on which the Imperial banner had been hoisted on the river Scheldt. He was later appointed captain of the frigate that guarded the Scheldt with effect from 10 August 1786. This position carried the benefit of a spacious home in Antwerp.

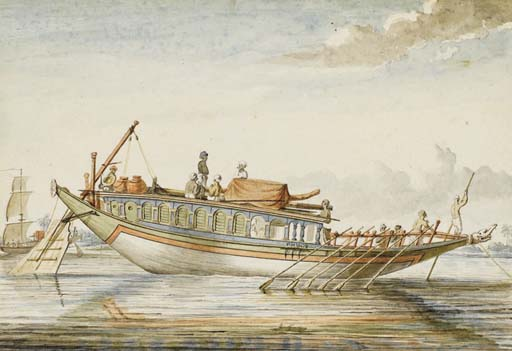
Budgerow

He was one of the founders of a society of artists known as the Genootschap ter aanmoediging der Schoone Kunsten (known under its short form as the Konstmaatschappij (the 'Art Society')), which was established in Antwerp on 12 November 1788. Other founders included Balthasar Paul Ommeganck, Pieter Faes, Miss Herry, Jan Josef Horemans the Younger, Ferdinand Verhoeven, Hendrik Aarnout Myin, Hendrik Frans de Cort, Mattheus Ignatius van Bree, Maria Jacoba Ommeganck, Marten Waefelaerts and many others. The objective of the society was the promotion and appreciation of the artworks of its various members in an informal setting

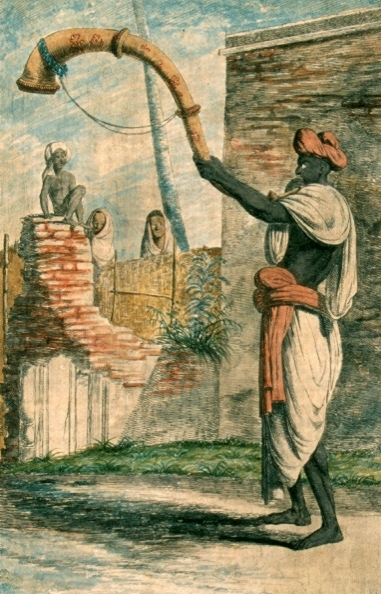
Ramsinga

After the Brabant Revolution and the forced departure of the Austrians from the Austrian Netherlands in 1789, he decided to board in Ostend the ship Etrusco which set sail for Bengal in 1790. He arrived in Calcutta in 1791. He initially worked as journeyman artist making decorations for the upper middle class in the British factory, ensuring the luster of their festivals and spectacles, restoring works of art and decorating carriages. Solvyns made several trips through the interior of the Indian subcontinent. Inspired by the British Orientalist and Sanskrit scholar Sir William Jones who had founded the Asiatic Society, he devised in 1794 the scheme to create a series of etchings that depict the everyday life of the inhabitants of the subcontinent.

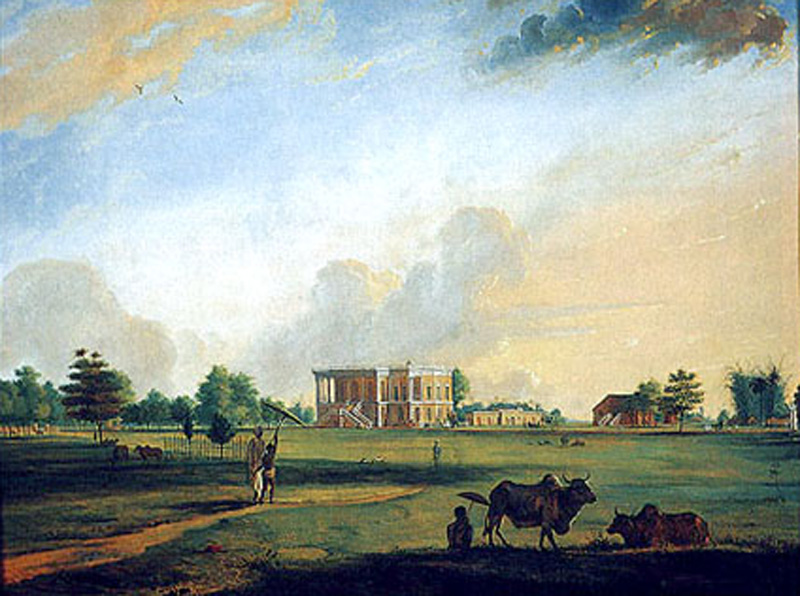
The Residence of Richard Goodlad at Baruipur

He published his first collection of about 250 etchings under the title A Collection of Two Hundred and Fifty Coloured Etchings: Descriptive of the Manners, Customs and Dresses of the Hindoos in Calcutta in 1796. More etchings followed in 1799. His etchings covered the castes and their professions, costumes, means of transportation, modes of smoking, fakirs, musical instruments, and festivals. The project was a financial failure. The reason for the failure may have been that according to the prevailing European artistic tastes of his time his drawings were too monotonous and somber in colour. The themes themselves appealed to the popular imagination, and Edward Orne, a publisher in London, published in 1807 without permission of Solvyns a successful pirate version, dedicated to the costumes, with redesigned prints in warmer colours.

After the failure of his project Solvyns returned to Europe in 1803. Solvyns married the wealthy Mary Anne Greenwood, daughter of an English family residing in Ghent. The couple had three children. Their youngest son Hendrik (Henri) Solvyns acquired fame as a Belgian diplomat and was later ennobled. In France, he reworked his etchings for a bilingual French/English edition (translated into English by his wife) entitled Les Hindous, which was published in Paris in four volumes between 1808 and 1812 with the financial assistance of his wife. The publication comprised 48 parts with a total of 288 colour-printed plates, all finished by hand. This publication was again a commercial failure possibly as a result of the unrest caused by the Napoleonic Wars, its high cost of production and the lack of interest among the local populace. The publication was to become an influential model for the so-called 'Company style' of Indian painting in the 19th century with its drawings of 'occupations' for the British serving in India.

After the Kingdom of the Netherlands, which included the former Austrian Netherlands, was formed in 1814 Solvyns returned to his birthplace Antwerp. William I of the Netherlands appointed him Captain of the Port in recognition of his accomplishments as an artist. Solvyns died in Antwerp on 10 October 1824.

== Works ==
- A Collection of Two Hundred and Fifty Coloured Etchings: Descriptive of the Manners, Customs and Dresses of the Hindoos, Calcutta, 1796, 1799.
- A Catalogue of 250 Coloured Etchings; Descriptive of the Manners, Customs, Character, Dress, and Religious Ceremonies of the Hindoos, Calcutta: Mirror Press, 1799 (a 28 page-brochure).
- Les Hindoûs, 4 vols. Paris: Chez L'Auteur, 1808–1812.
- The Costume of Indostan [pirated edition], London: Edward Orme [1804-05], 1807.
