= Balthasar Paul Ommeganck =

Flemish painter (1755–1826)

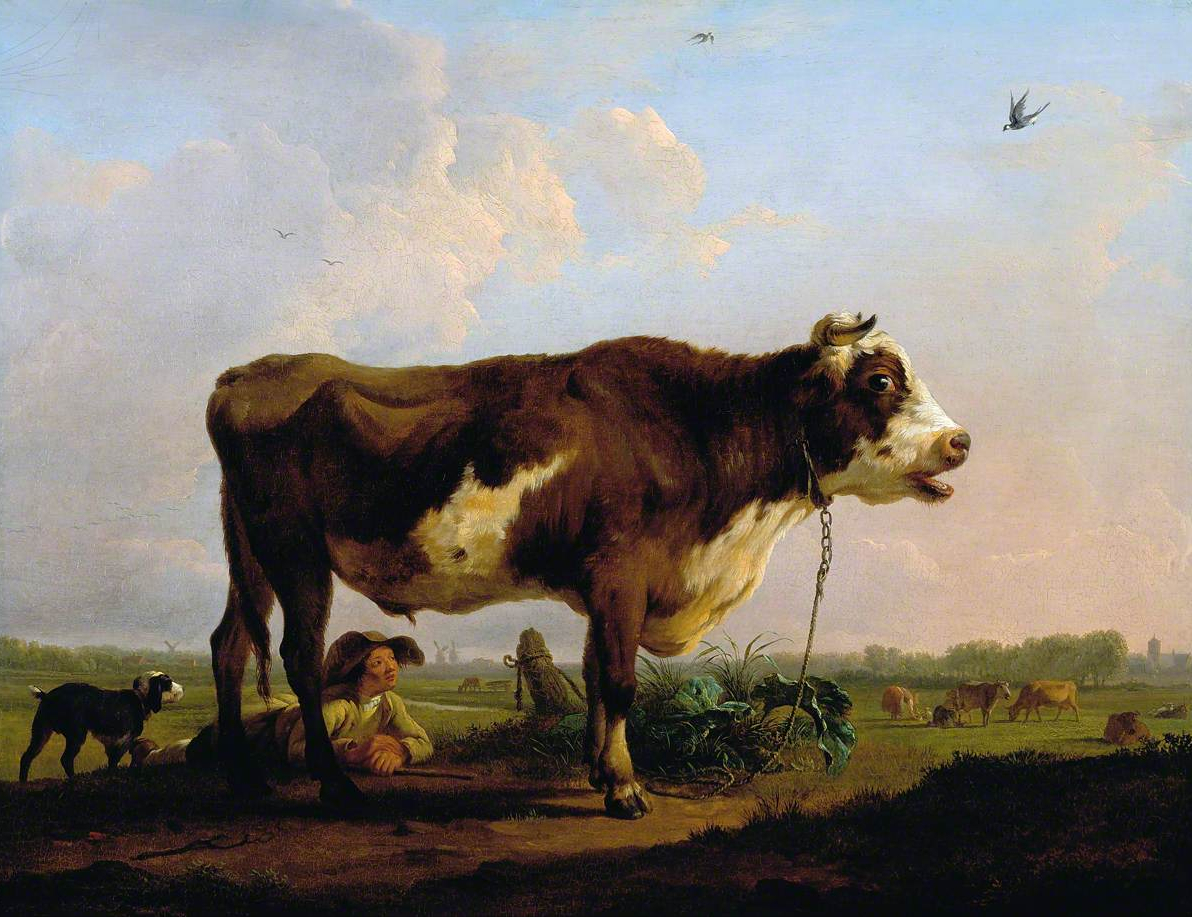
A bull

Balthasar Paul Ommeganck (sometimes also: Paul Balthasar Ommeganck) (1755–1826) was a Flemish painter of landscapes and animals active in Antwerp. Through his work and his role as an art teacher and founder of art institutions he gave an important impetus to the revitalization of landscape painting in the Low Countries.

== Life ==
He was born in Antwerp in 1755 as the fourth child of Paulus Ommeganck and Barbara Laenen. He was registered in the Antwerp Guild of Saint Luke as a pupil of the respected painter Hendricus Josephus Antonissen from 1767. At the same time he also attended classes at the Antwerp Academy where he obtained a second prize for drawing after the Antique in March 1771. He specialized in landscapes and the rendering of the coat of animals in particular of sheep.

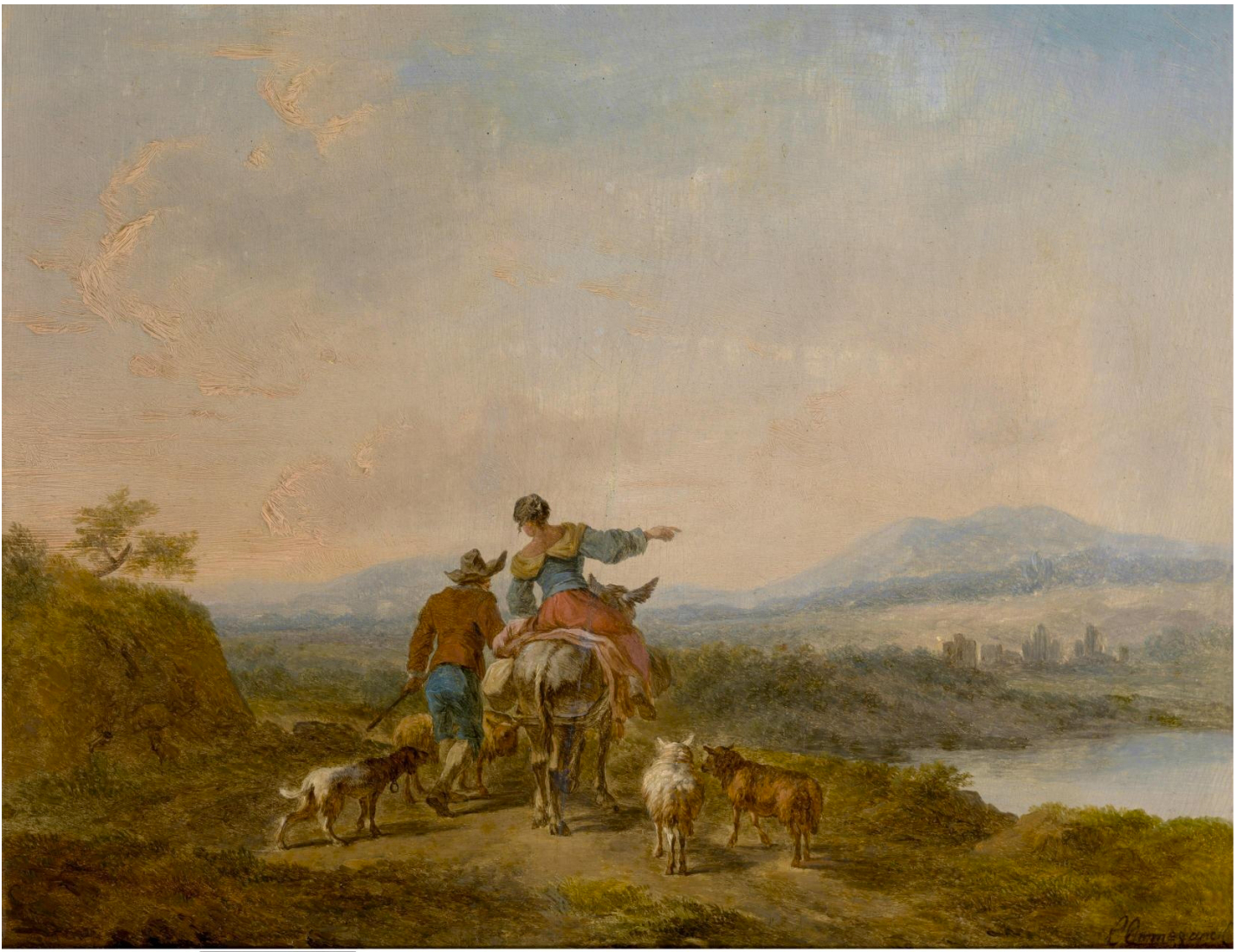
Landscape with figures

On 26 June 1781 he married Petronilla Isabella Maria Jacoba Parrin in Antwerp. They had two sons and seven daughters, one of which was the animal painter Johanna Maria Ommeganck.

He was one of the founders in 1788 of a society of artists known as the Konstmaatschappij (the 'Art Society'). Other founders included Hendrik Frans de Cort, Pieter Faes, Jan Frans Josef Mertens, Willem Schaeken, Antoon Herry, Jan Josef Horemans the Younger, Bartholomeus Jan van Hulst, Jan Baptist Beguinet, Hendrik Aarnout Myin, Hendrik Blomaert, Frans Balthasar Solvyns, Ignatius Jozef van den Berghe, Godfried Frans Bex and the art lover A. Renodi. The first exhibition of the society was held in Antwerp in 1789. Ommeganck contributed 4 works to this first exhibition. Artists who would later join included Mattheus Ignatius van Bree, Maria Jacoba Ommeganck, Marten Waefelaerts and many others.

In 1789 he became dean of the Guild of St. Luke of Antwerp, the penultimate dean as the Guild was dissolved by the French occupiers in 1794. In 1796 he was appointed professor at the Antwerp Académie de peinture, sculpture et architecture d'Anvers.

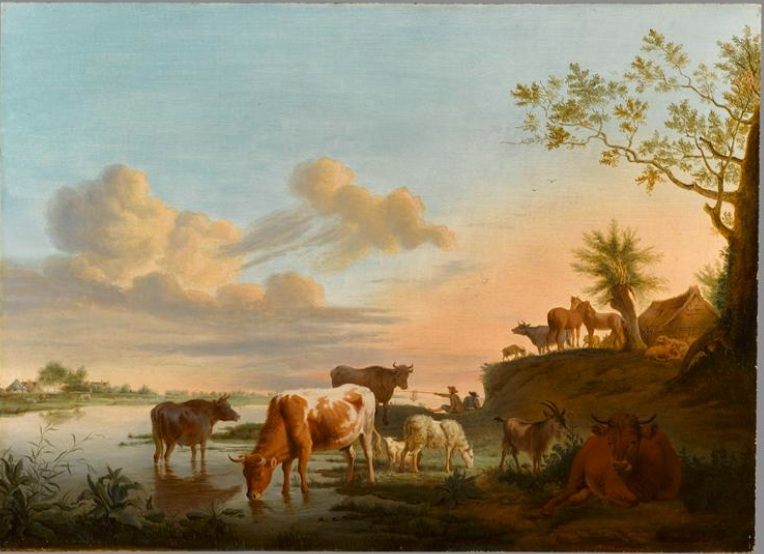
Grazing cows, sheep, goats and horses

In 1799 a painting of Ommeganck won the first prize for landscapes in Paris. Ommeganck had not wished to participate in the Paris competition but the painting was submitted by a friend without his knowledge. In 1809 he became a corresponding member of the Institut de France, which had been established on 25 October 1795 to group France's five académies. He was also a member of the Academies of Amsterdam, Brussels, Ghent, Munich and Vienna.

In 1800 he was invited to become together with Willem Jacob Herreyns a teacher of the members of the newly established Genootschap der Kunsten ((Society for the arts')). This was an organisation set up at the initiative of Mattheus Ignatius van Bree and included initially Jan van Bree, Jean-Baptiste Berré. Lambrecht Dentijn, Jan Carpentero, Ferdinand Verhoeven, Peter Iven, Michiel Dierickxen, Jan Peeters and others. The members undertook to meet to show and discuss their works and enjoy the tuition of the older generation of painters. At the end of 1800 the Konstmaatschappij which had been established in 1788 was merged with the Genootschap der Kunsten. The merged organisation would organise an annual exhibition of its members' works.

He was one of the commissioners who were appointed by the Dutch government in 1815 to recover from France the objects of art which France had stolen during the occupation. In 1816 he became fourth class member of the Royal Institute of the Netherlands.

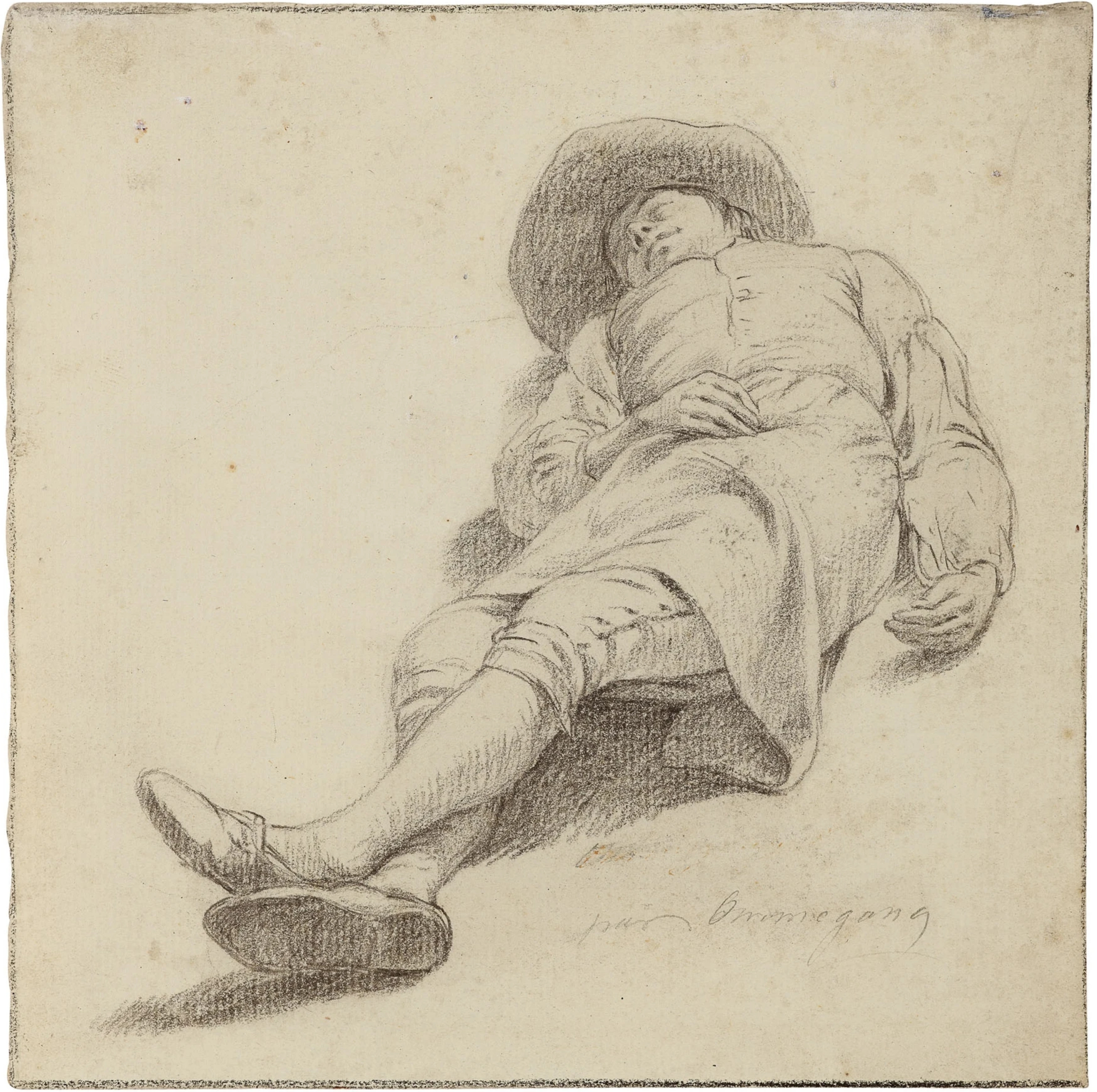
Young man with a hat sleeping on his back

His students included Jan Baptiste de Jonghe, Frédéric Théodore Faber, Pieter Martinus Gregoor, Jacob van Kouwenhoven, Hendrik Aarnout Myin, Ignatius Josephus van Regemorter, Adrianus de Visser, Eugène Joseph Verboeckhoven, Julien-Joseph Ducorron and his sister Maria Jacoba Ommeganck.

He died in Antwerp.

== Work ==
Ommeganck was very successful during his lifetime and his works demanded high prices. His main contribution to landscape painting was the combination in his works of the light found in the work of the Dutch Italianate painters of the 17th century with detailed observation of nature. He was thus able to find a synthesis between realism and an idealized representation of nature. His work shows a painstaking attention to detail, a sure line and subtle use of colour. His preferred subjects were undulating landscapes. He painted mainly on panel.

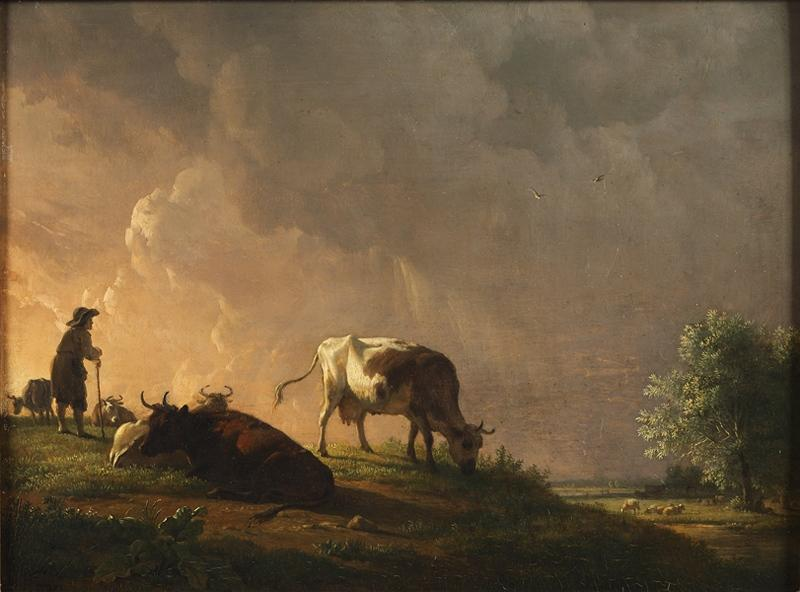
Shepherd and flock

Ommeganck renewed the Belgian landscape tradition through his careful observation of the local picturesque landscape. This he combined with an interest in representing atmospheric conditions and the warm light of the rising or setting sun. The concept of the ideal landscape influenced the compositions of his works. This preoccupation was linked to a more direct curiosity for the landscape, which led him towards a topographical and descriptive representation of the landscape. Ommeganck's style was widely followed in the 18th and early 19th century. Later art critics have not always been equally positive about the work of Ommeganck. Some have made the reproach that by embedding itself in the classic tradition and through its preference for the contrived, picturesque and the conventional, the landscape tradition of Ommeganck represents a 'hopeless traditionalism'.

He also made a few portraits such as that of the Painter Jean-Baptiste Berré (Royal Museum of Fine Arts Antwerp).

He was a skilled draughtsman and also worked as a sculptor producing some clay models of sheep and cows.
