= Ommeganck =

Ommeganck may refer to:

- Balthasar Paul Ommeganck (1755–1826), Flemish painter
- Maria Jacoba Ommeganck (1760–1849), Flemish painter
- Ommegang, generic name for various Low Countries medieval pageants
