= Jan Frans Eliaerts =

Flemish painter (1761–1848)

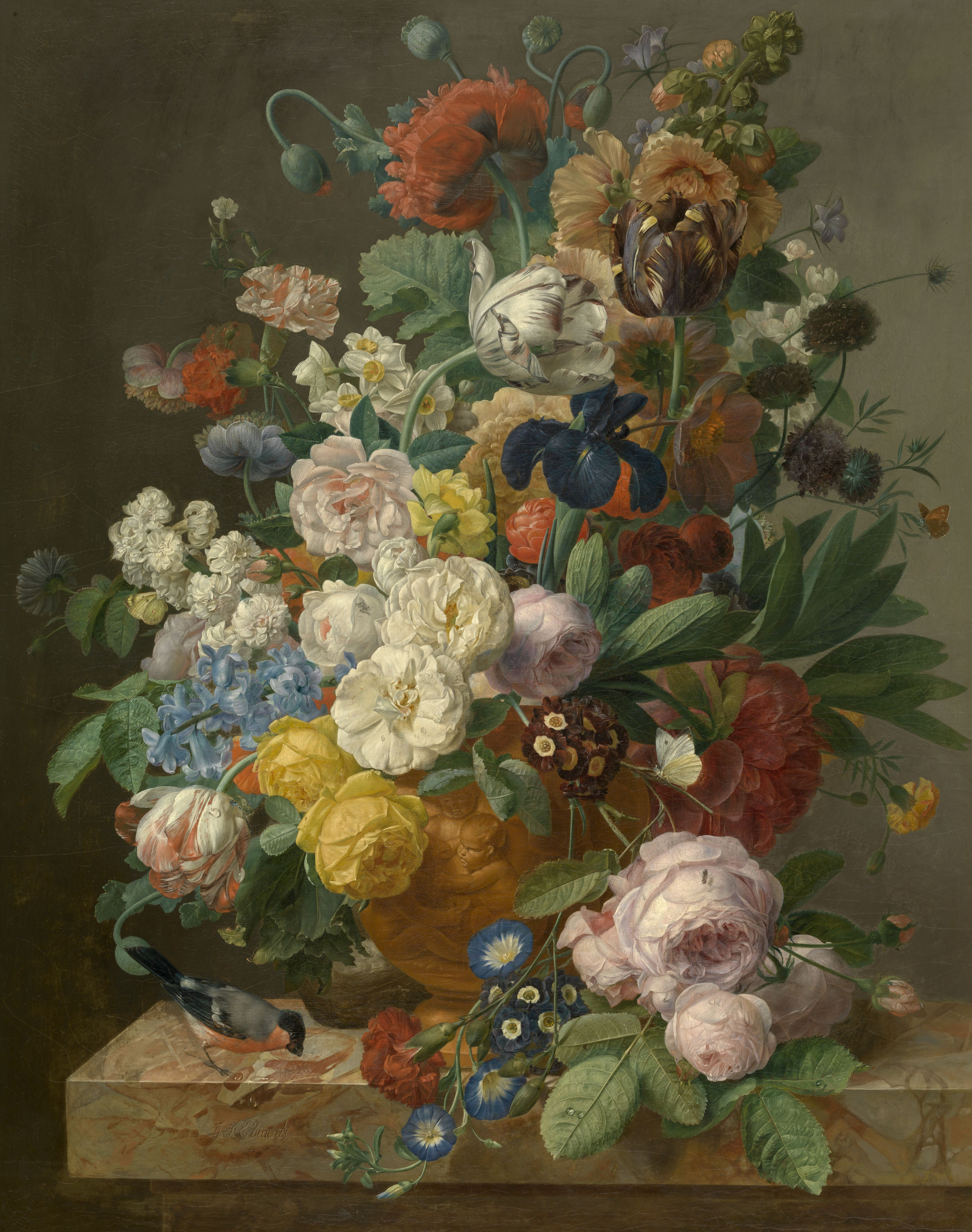
Bouquet of Flowers in a Sculpted Vase, now in the Royal Museum of Fine Arts, Antwerp

Jan Frans Eliaerts (30 December 1761 - 17 May 1848) was a Flemish painter of animals, flowers, and fruit who migrated to France where he was active most of his life.

== Life ==
Eliaerts was born in Deurne near Antwerp. He studied at the Academy of Antwerp. Here he became acquainted with Georges Frédéric Ziesel and Pieter Faes who specialised in flower pieces like him. He moved to Paris where he was a teacher at the Institut du Légion d'Honneur in the Paris suburb of Saint-Denis.

He regularly took part in the Paris salons and won various awards (silver medals in Lille, 1822, and Douai in 1827 and 1831). He also created cartons for tapestries of the Gobelin factory. At the end of his life he decided to return to Antwerp where he died.

== Work ==
His flower paintings are in the tradition of the Baroque tradition of flower painting developed by Daniel Seghers, Jan Philip van Thielen and Jan van Huysum and show parallels with the work of Jan Frans van Dael. Together with Georges Frédéric Ziesel and Pieter Faes he was the principal heir of this tradition in Belgium.

Eliaerts also painted some genre pieces, which were set in a scene with flowers.

The majority of his works are located in France. The Royal Museum of Fine Arts in Antwerp has a flower piece by him.
