= Philippe-Jacques van Bree =

Flemish painter

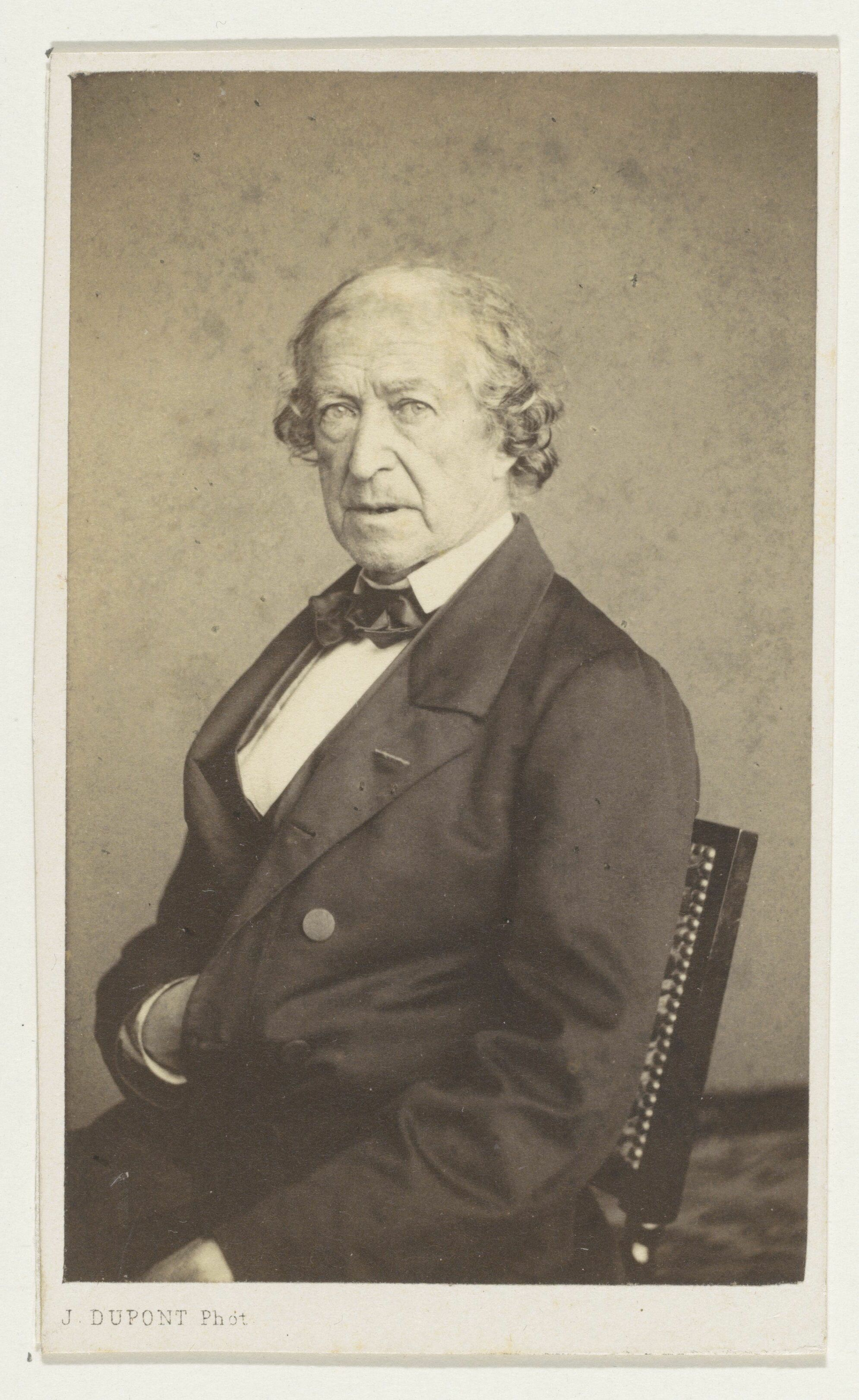
- Born: Philippe-Jacques van Bree; 13 January 1786; Antwerp, Austrian Netherlands
- Died: 16 February 1871 (aged 85); Saint-Josse-ten-Noode, Belgium
- Notable work: Workshop of female painters; The first pose. The Artist's studio in Rome; Close to the fountain

Philippe-Jacques van Bree was a Belgian painter and scholar of his brother Mattheus, was born at Antwerp in 1786.

== Biography ==
He studied at Antwerp, in Paris (where he became a scholar of Anne-Louis Girodet de Roussy-Trioson), and at Rome; and also visited Germany and England. He employed himself on historical, fancy, and architectural subjects. Of the last, the Belgian Government purchased his View of the Interior of the Church of St. Peter at Rome, and presented him with a gold medal in addition to the price.

He was made conservator of the Royal Museums of Fine Arts in Brussels. He died in Saint-Josse-ten-Noode in 1871.

== Gallery ==
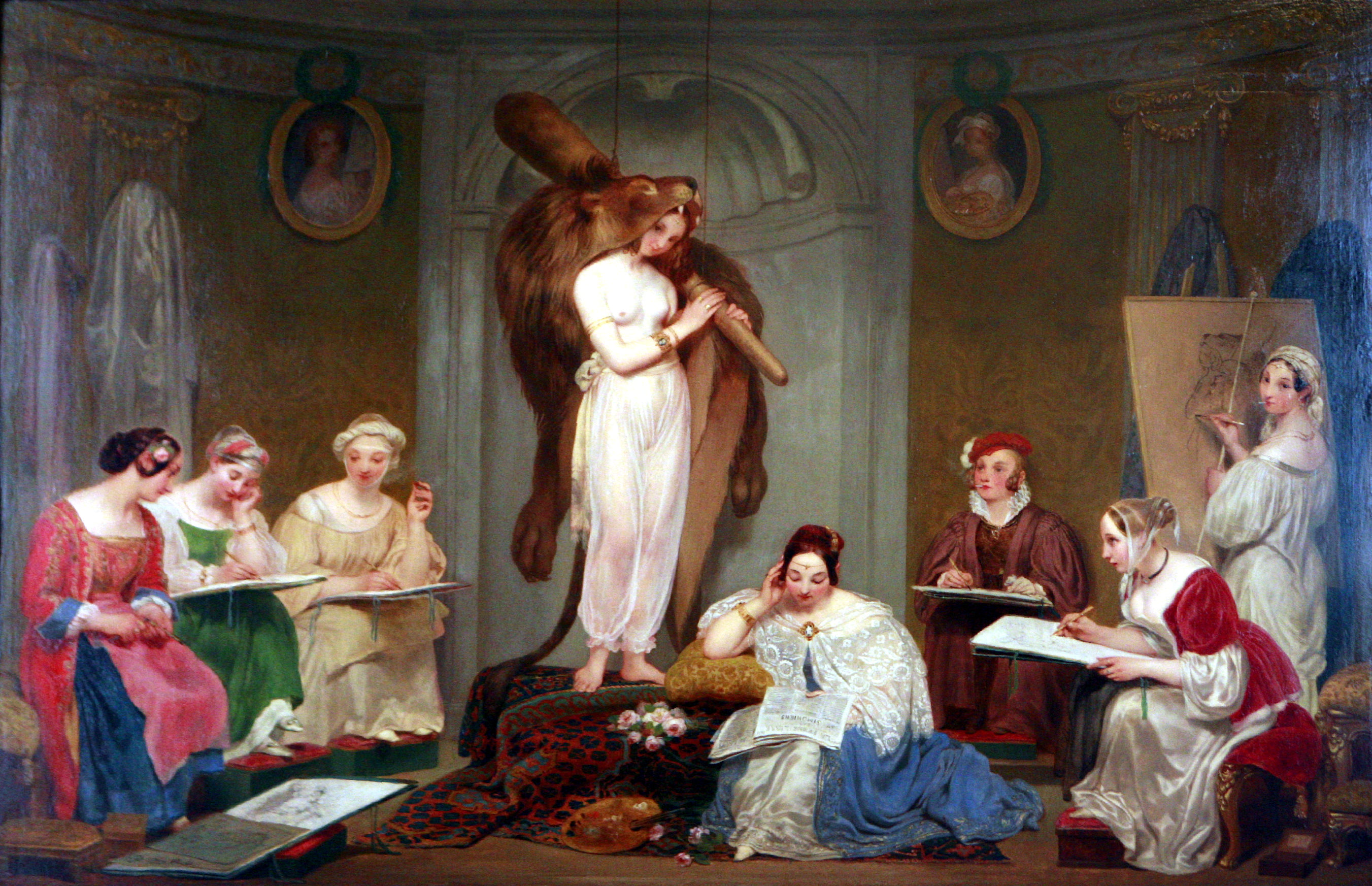
Workshop of female painters (Royal Museums of Fine Arts of Belgium)

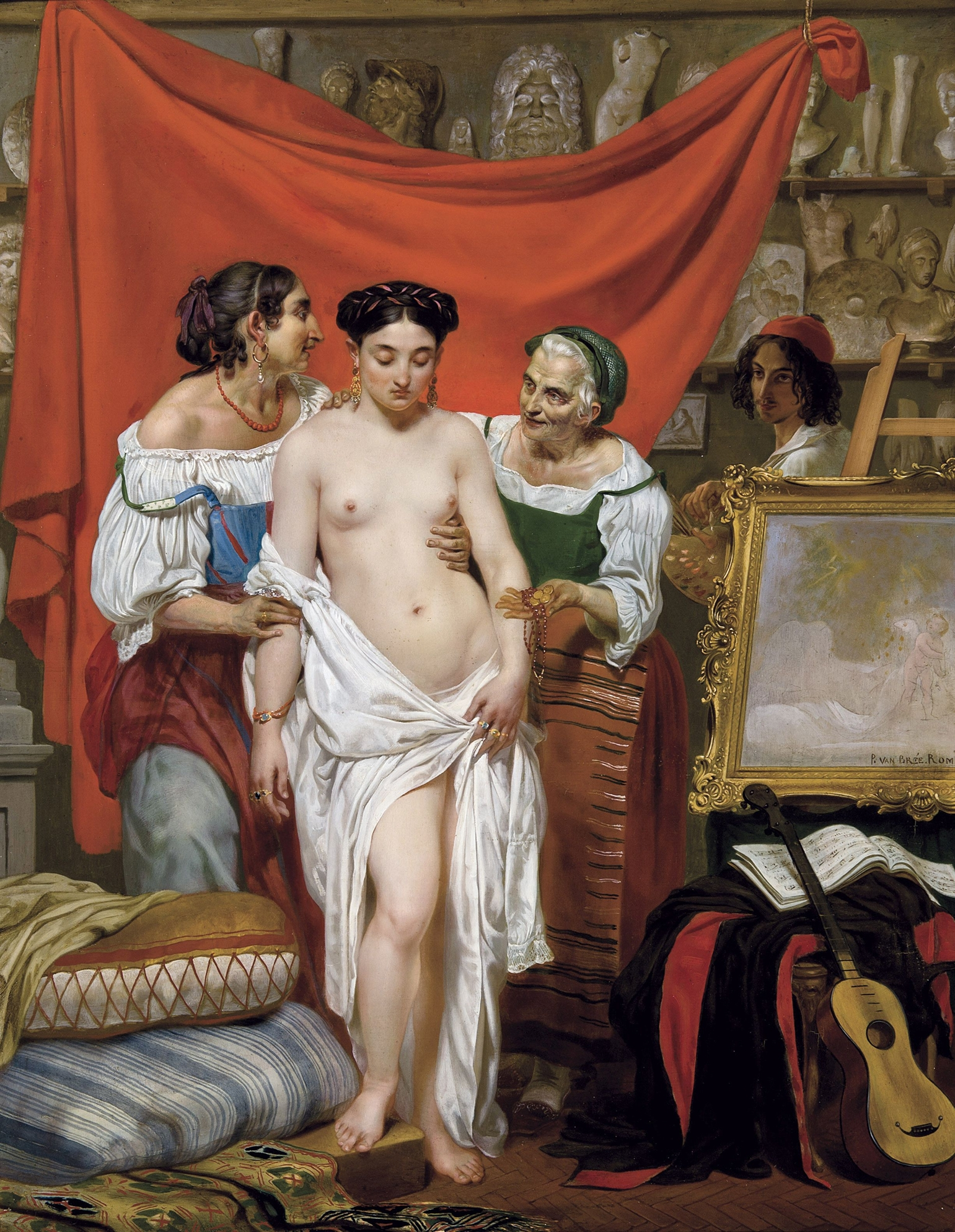
The first pose. The Artist's studio in Rome, 1833
Private collection

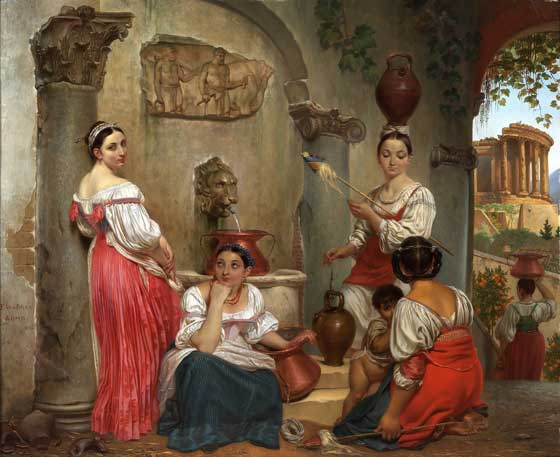
Close to the fountain, 1832.
Private collection
