= Frédéric Théodore Faber =

Painter (1782–1844)

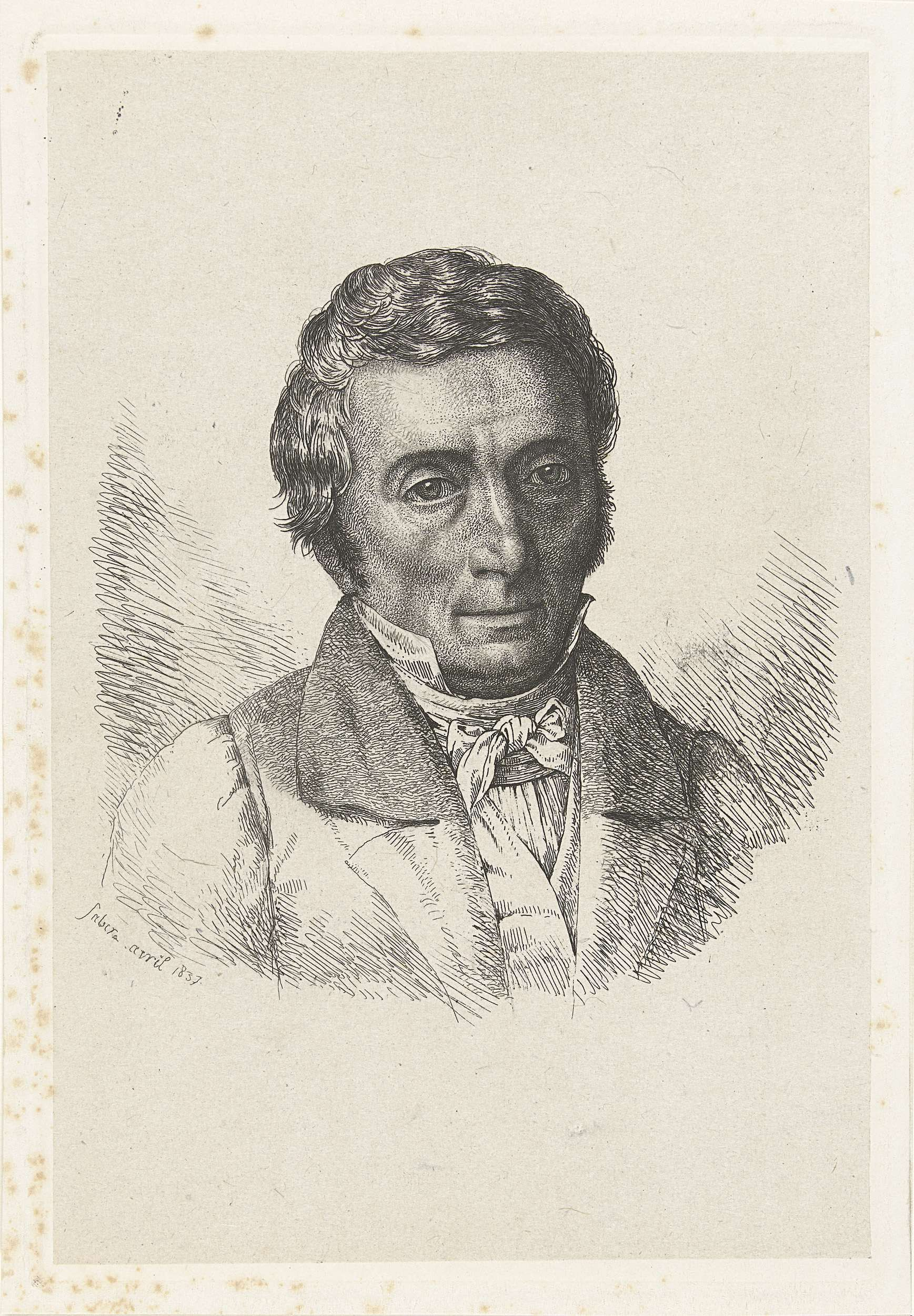

Frédéric Théodore Faber, a Belgian landscape and genre painter, born at Brussels, Austrian Netherlands in 1782. He was first instructed by his father, but in 1799 he went to Antwerp, and studied under Balthasar Paul Ommeganck. He afterwards established at Brussels a china manufactory, and abandoned painting on canvas for painting on porcelain. He also etched upwards of a hundred plates of landscapes and animals, some after his own designs, and others after Ommeganck, De Roy, and Van Assche. He died in 1844.

A significant set of pieces painted by this virtuoso is exhibited at the Museum of Decorative Arts François Duesberg (Mons - Belgium).
