= Jean-Baptiste Berré =

Flemish painter (1777–1839)

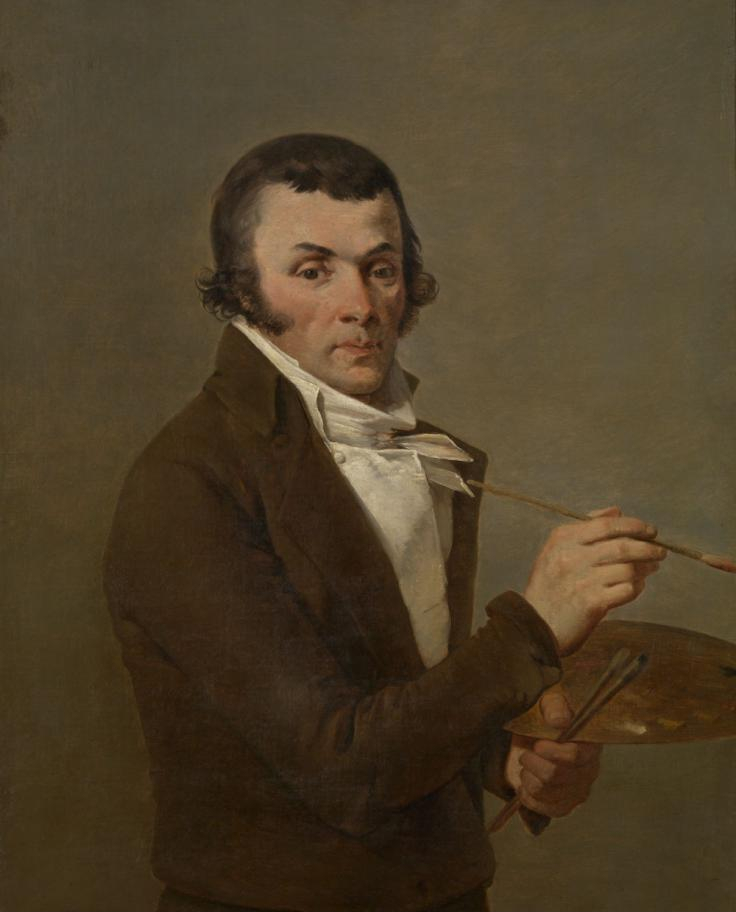
Jean-Baptiste Berré

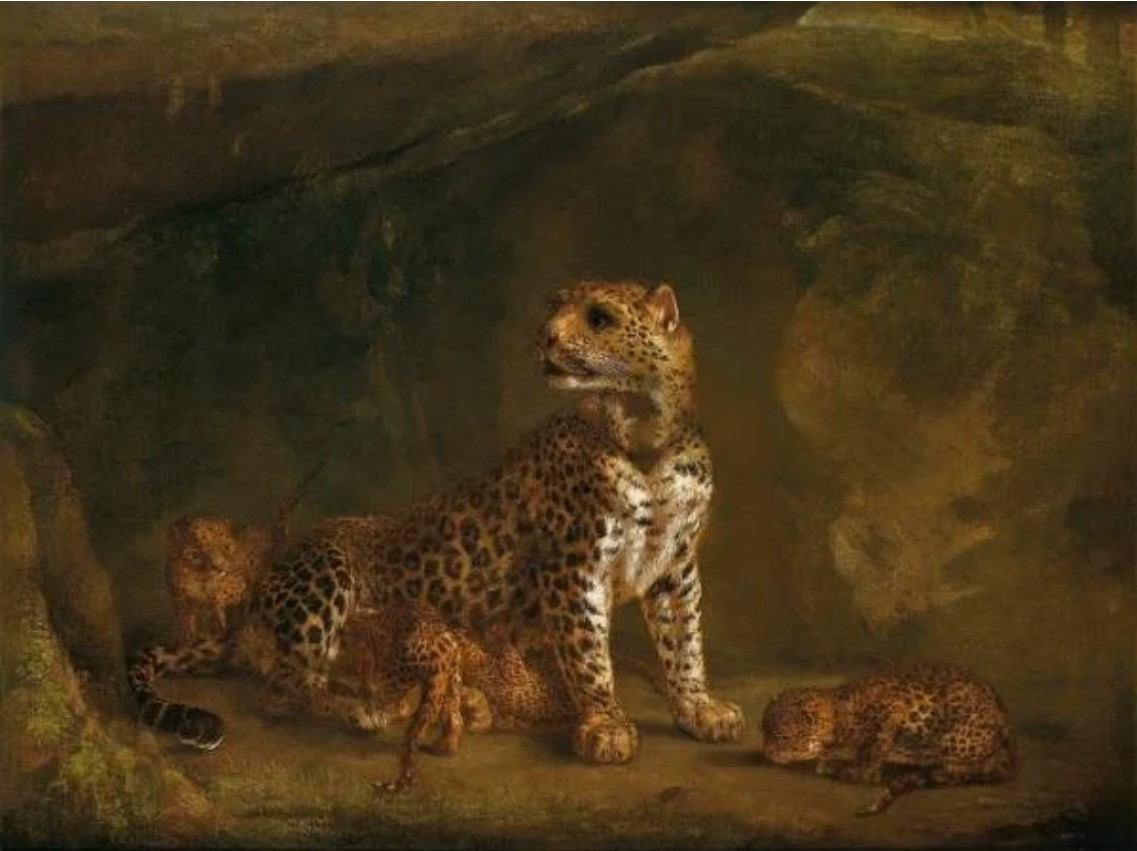
A leopard and her cubs

Jean-Baptiste Berré or Jan Baptist Berré Antwerp, 11 February 1777 – Paris, 6 May 1839) was a Flemish painter and sculptor. He trained in Antwerp where he painted mainly still lifes. He later moved to Paris where he made a name as an animalier painter and sculptor. His patrons included members of the court during the First French Empire and the First Restoration. He was employed as an official painter at the Jardin du Roi in Paris. In this role he was chosen as one of the artists invited to portray Sarah Baartman, the 'Hottentot Venus', in 1815.

== Life ==
Berré was born in Antwerp on 11 February 1777. He entered the studio of a decorative painter at a very young age. At the same time spent time copying old master paintings. He enrolled at the Academy of Antwerp where he studied, among others, with Balthasar Paul Ommeganck, a renowned animal painter.

In 1800 he became a member of the newly established Genootschap der Kunsten (Society for the arts). This was an organisation set up at the initiative of Mattheus Ignatius van Bree and included initially Berré himself, Jan van Bree, Lambrecht Dentijn, Jan Carpentero, Ferdinand Verhoeven, Peter Iven, Michiel Dierickxen, Jan Peeters and others. The members undertook to meet monthly to show and discuss their works and enjoy the tuition of the older generation of painters such as Ommeganck and Willem Jacob Herreyns who were invited to act as teachers of the members. At the end of 1800 the pre-existing artist organisation Konstmaatschappij, which had been established in 1788, was merged with the Genootschap der Kunsten. The merged organisation would organise an annual exhibition of its members' works. From 1802 onwards Berré regularly participated in the Antwerp and Ghent Salons. He presented a religious painting (a Mater Dolorosa) in Antwerp in 1802. The majority of his works consisted of still lifes, landscapes and animals.

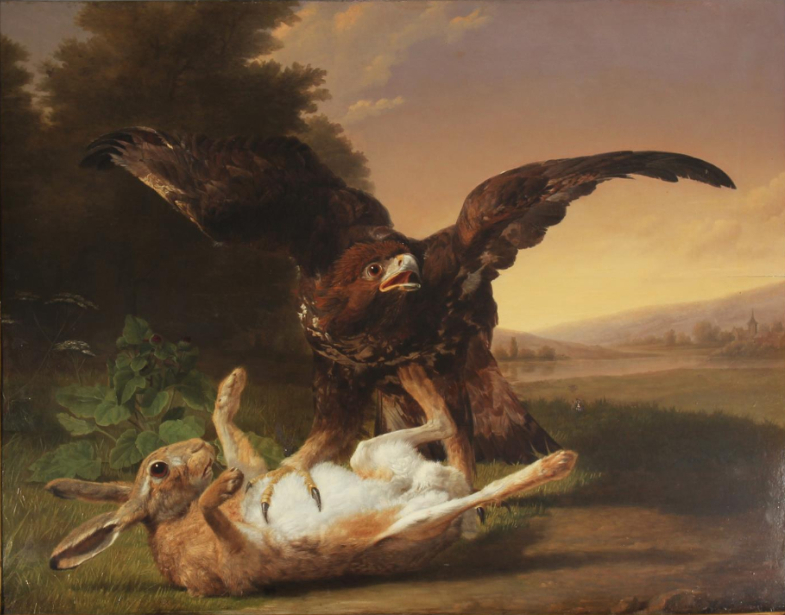
Eagle catching a hare

Berré left Antwerp for Paris in 1808. He took part in the exhibition at the Napoleonic Museum in the same year. He earned his living by reproducing his own paintings on serving trays. The story goes that Empress Josephine noticed one of these objects at a picnic. This resulted in a demand for his work from France's high society. At the Salon of 1810, he exhibited a Lioness with lion cubs on varnished sheet metal, commissioned by the Empress. Finding success with the theme of wild animals, Berré started to concentrate on representations of wild animals such as lions, tigers, snakes, etc. which he studied from nature at the Jardin du Roi. This subject appealed to the taste for exoticism of his bourgeois clientele. At the same time he still painted landscapes and domestic animals with pastoral scenes. He was given a lodging and place for a workshop at the Jardin du Roi in 1812. The French naturalist Pierre Antoine Delalande took art classes from him there.

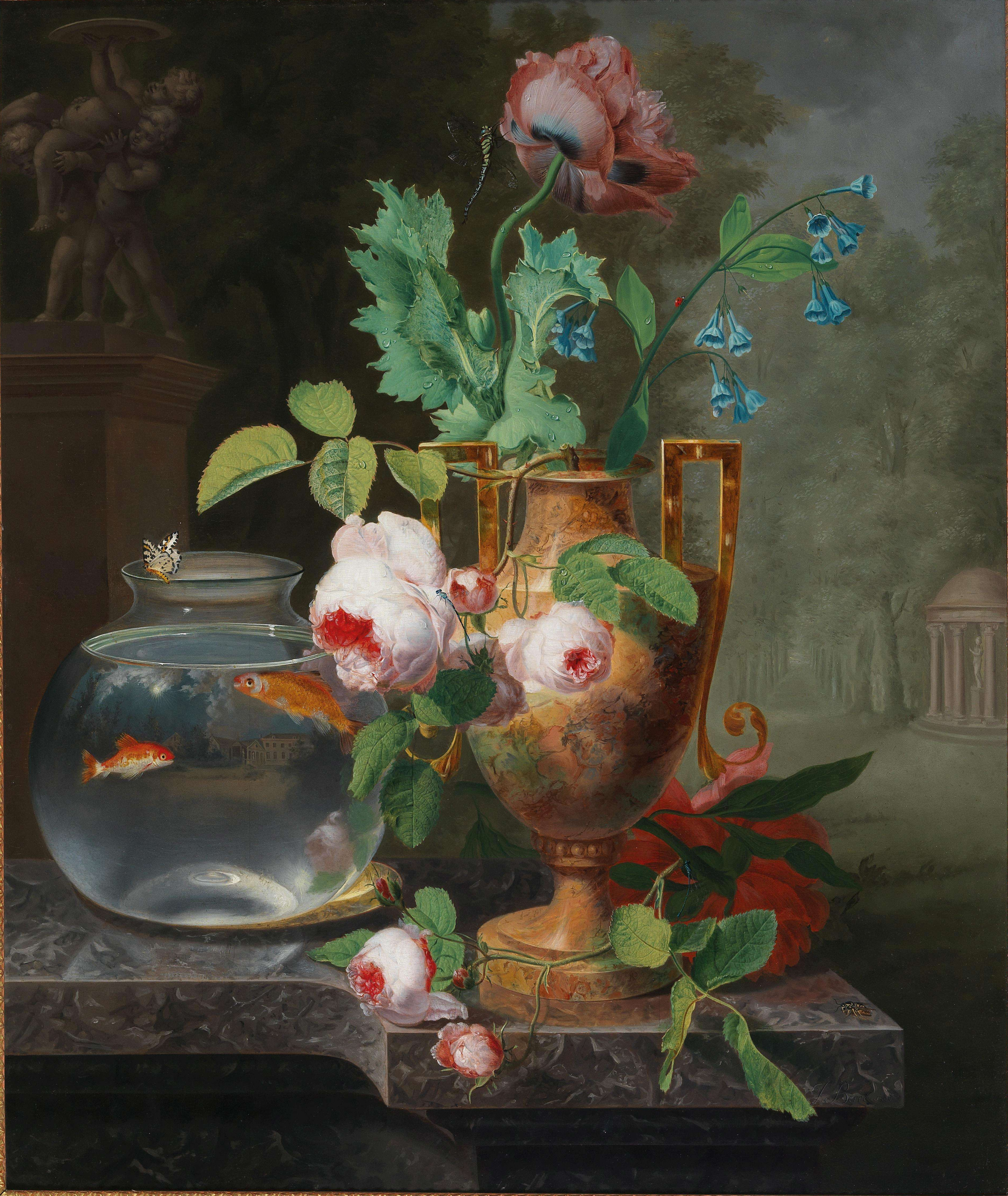
Still Life with flowers in a vase and a goldfish bowl

He sent his works to various exhibitions organized in his home country. He sent the Royal Eagle about to snatch a lamb to the Brussels Salon of 1811, the Monkey and the Cat to the Ghent Salon of 1812, Dogs and Swans to the Ghent Salon of 1814, Stags and Hinds in a Forest to the Brussels Salon of 1821, a Landscape with an Oxen Cart to the Amsterdam Salon of 1822 and Resting Animals and Figures to the Ghent Salon of 1823. His works fetched high prices and were collected throughout Europe. At the Paris Salon of 1814 he exhibited the painting Romulus and Remus suckled by the she-wolf. This harmless painting became politically charged at one point when Berré produced copies of it showing an imperial eagle killing all kinds of animals.

In the spring of 1815, Berré formed together with Léon de Wailly and Nicolas Huet the team of resident artists of the National Museum of Natural History in Paris who were tasked with painting a portrait of Saartjie Baartman. Saartjie Baartman was a Khoisan maidservant from the Cape Colony who at the age of 21 years had been smuggled to London. Here she had become a stage performer who attracted a large public because of her ethnic features including a very large buttocks. In 1814 she came to France. A panel of leading scientists and naturalists led by Georges Cuvier conducted a 'scientific' research of Baartman. As part if this, the three resident artists produced their portraits. The delicate watercolour portraits which they made of her figure were widely reproduced and became collectible popular art.

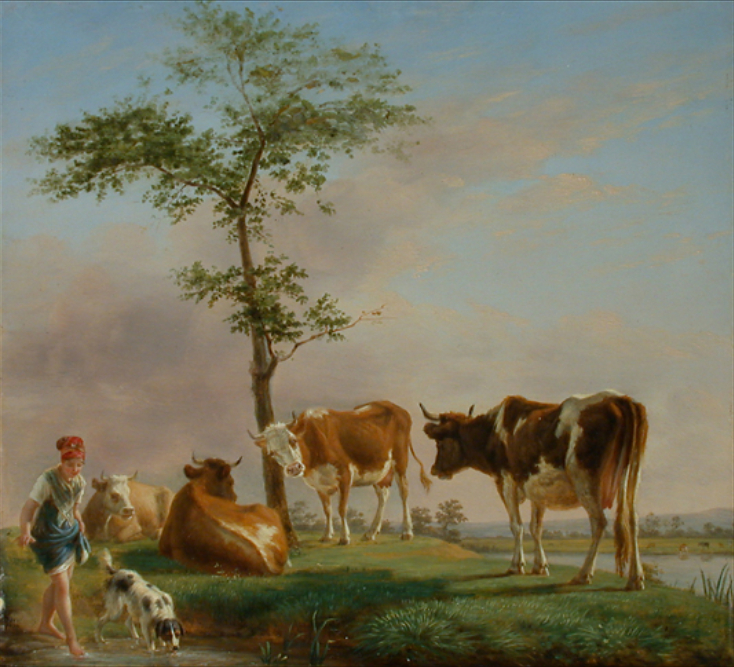
Cows in the pasture with shepherdess and a dog

His success did not diminish with the fall of the Empire in 1815. In 1817 he made a painting showing a visit made by the Duke and Duchess of Berry to the menagerie of the Royal Garden, on the occasion of the arrival in Paris of one of the first elephants from India. His paintings were present in all the major collections of the First Restoration and are currently distributed in many French provincial museums. In 1825 he was made an honorary member of the Royal Society of Brussels.

He remained in Paris for the rest of his career and died there on 6 May 1839.

== Work ==
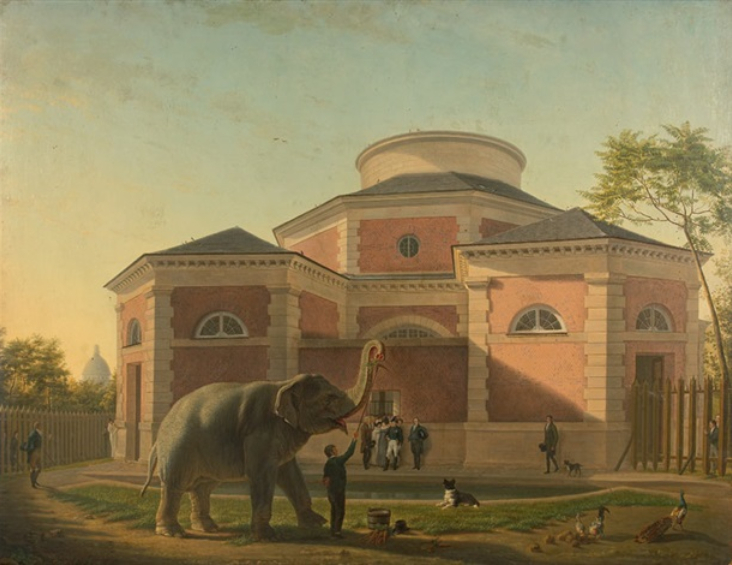
The elephant of the Royal Garden

Berré painted still lifes, landscapes and animals. His works were appreciated for their finish and the perfection of their execution.

He was known for the technical quality and finish of his works. Berré's bright and warm colours are in the tradition of Dutch and Flemish painting. The study of nature allowed him to render animals with great fidelity. He typically did not paint the staffage in his works but asked specialist painters to take care of this. Thus in his Romulus and Remus suckled by the she-wolf exhibited in Paris in 1814, the two figures are believed to be by the hand of Mattheus Ignatius van Bree.

Berré also worked as a sculptor. His sculptural work consists entirely of the representation of animals in plaster or bronze.
