= Maria Jacoba Ommeganck =

Flemish painter

- Born: 1760; Antwerp, Austrian Netherlands
- Died: December 16, 1849 (aged 88–89); Antwerp, Belgium
- Known for: Painting
- Movement: Neoclassicism
- Spouse: Hendrik Arnold Myin (m. 1786)

Maria Jacoba Ommeganck (1760 – 16 December 1849) was a Flemish neoclassicistic animal painter, specializing in pictures with cattle.

Ommeganck was born in Antwerp in 1760 and baptized on 14 August of that year. She was a daughter of Paul and Barbara Ommeganck Laenen and sister of painter Balthasar-Paul Ommeganck (1755–1826). In May 1786 she married painter Hendrik Arnold Myin (1760–1826). Maria Jacoba Ommeganck died in Antwerp on 16 December 1849.

Maria Jacoba Ommeganck, probably pupil of her famous brother, practiced painting as fine art dilettante. In 1788 she was co-founder of the Antwerp artist group Konstmaetschappije "tot Nut, Baet en Dienst”, together with her brother, Hendrik Frans de Cort, Frans Balthazar Solvyns, Pieter Faes, Mattheus Ignatius van Bree and Marten Waefelaerts.
