= Jules Victor Génisson =

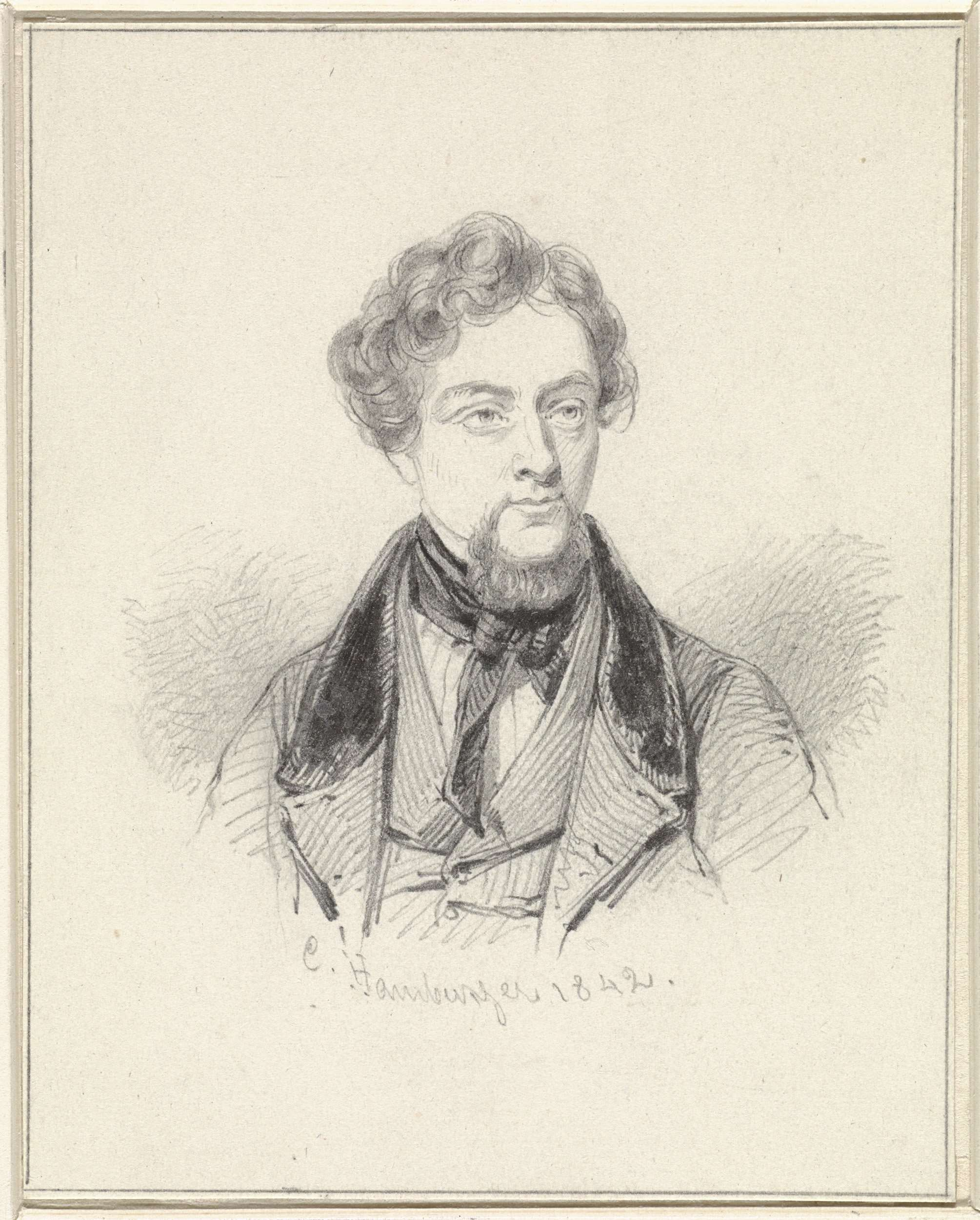
- Self portrait
- Born: Jules Victor Génisson; 24 February 1805; Saint-Omer, France
- Died: 10 October 1860 (aged 55); Bruges, Belgium
- Education: Royal Academy of Fine Arts of Antwerp
- Occupation: Painter

Interior of the Cathedral of Amiens, 1842, now in the Pinacoteca do Estado de São Paulo

Jules Victor Génisson (French pronunciation: [ʒyl viktɔʁ ʒenisɔ̃]; 24 February 1805 – 10 October 1860) was a Belgian painter, chiefly known for his architectural painting.

== Biography ==
Born in Saint-Omer, in Northern France, in 1805, he studied at the Royal Academy of Fine Arts in Antwerp under Mattheus Ignatius van Bree. He travelled extensively throughout Western Europe, painting large sized church interiors. He was a teacher of Joseph Maswiens and of his own son Georges-Paul Génisson.

He died in Bruges in 1860.
