= Hendrik-Jozef Antonissen =

Flemish painter

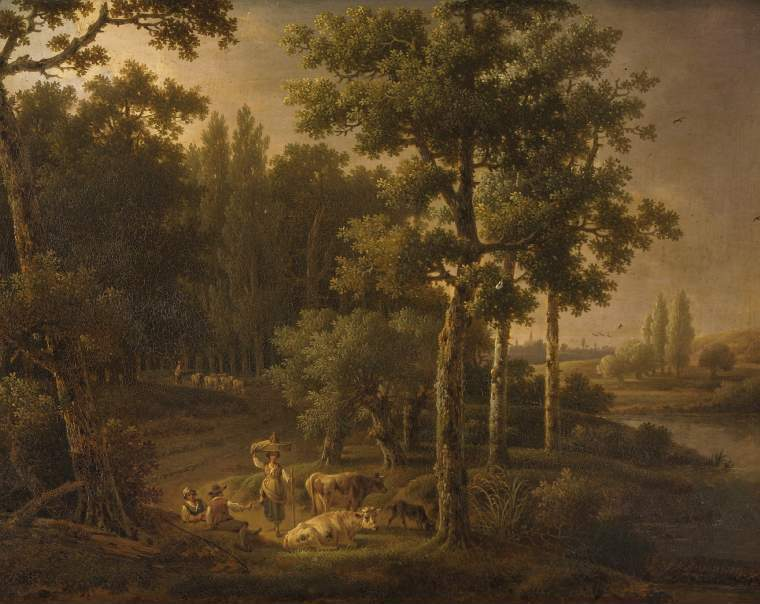
Henricus Josephus Antonissen – Landscape with flocks

Hendrik-Jozef Antonissen (9 June 1737 – 4 April 1794) was a Flemish painter of landscapes and cattle from the Austrian Netherlands in the Holy Roman Empire.

== Life ==
Antonissen was born at Antwerp in 1737. He entered the studio of Balthazar Besohey in 1752–53, and three years later he was free of the Guild at Antwerp of which he was twice Dean. His works are mostly in private collections on the Continent. In the Stadel Gallery at Frankfort there is a Landscape with Cattle by him, signed and dated 1792. He died at Antwerp, in 1794. He had many pupils, including Balthasar Paul Ommeganck.
