= Ignatius Josephus van Regemorter =

Flemish painter

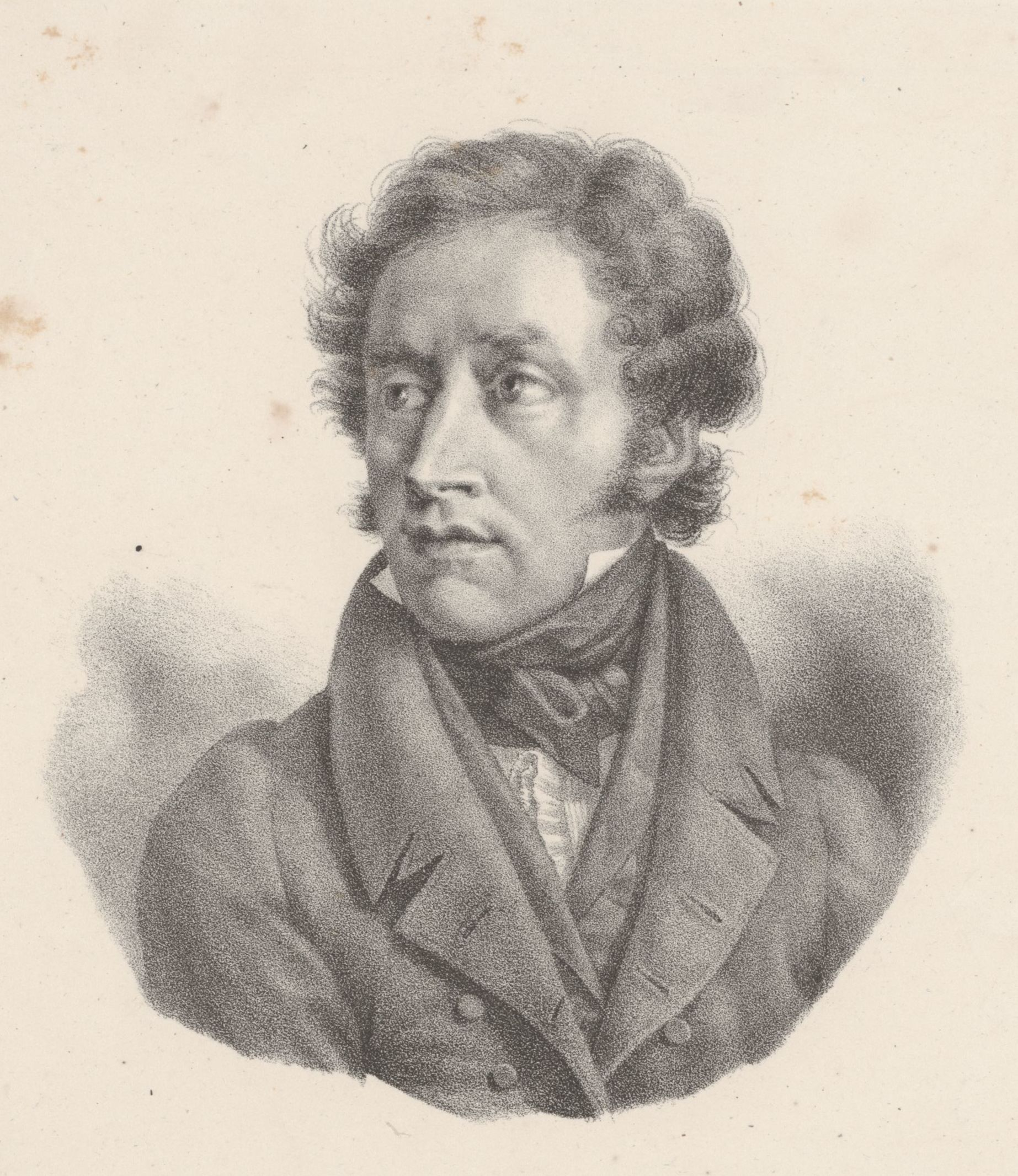
Ignatius Josephus van Regemorter, by Guillaume Philidor Van den Burggraaff

Ignatius Josephus van Regemorter was a Flemish historical, landscape, and genre painter and engraver, born at Antwerp in 1785. He studied under his father, Petrus Johannes, also in Paris, Antwerp, Brussels, and Ghent. He died at Antwerp in 1873.

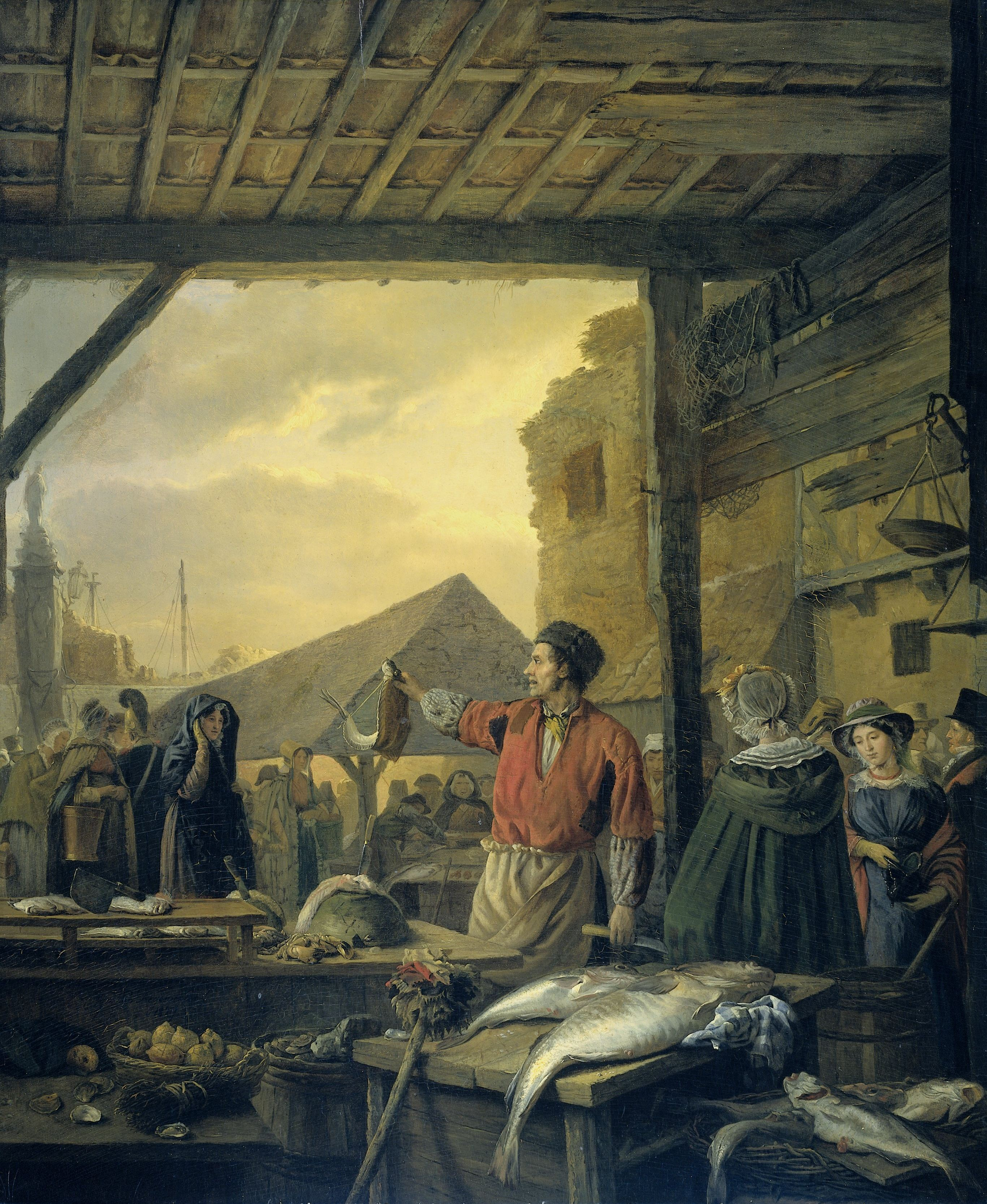
Fish market in Antwerp (1827), Rijksmuseum Amsterdam

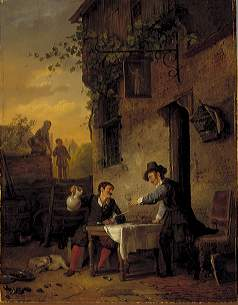
Jan Steen and Frans van Mieris (1828), Amsterdam Museum

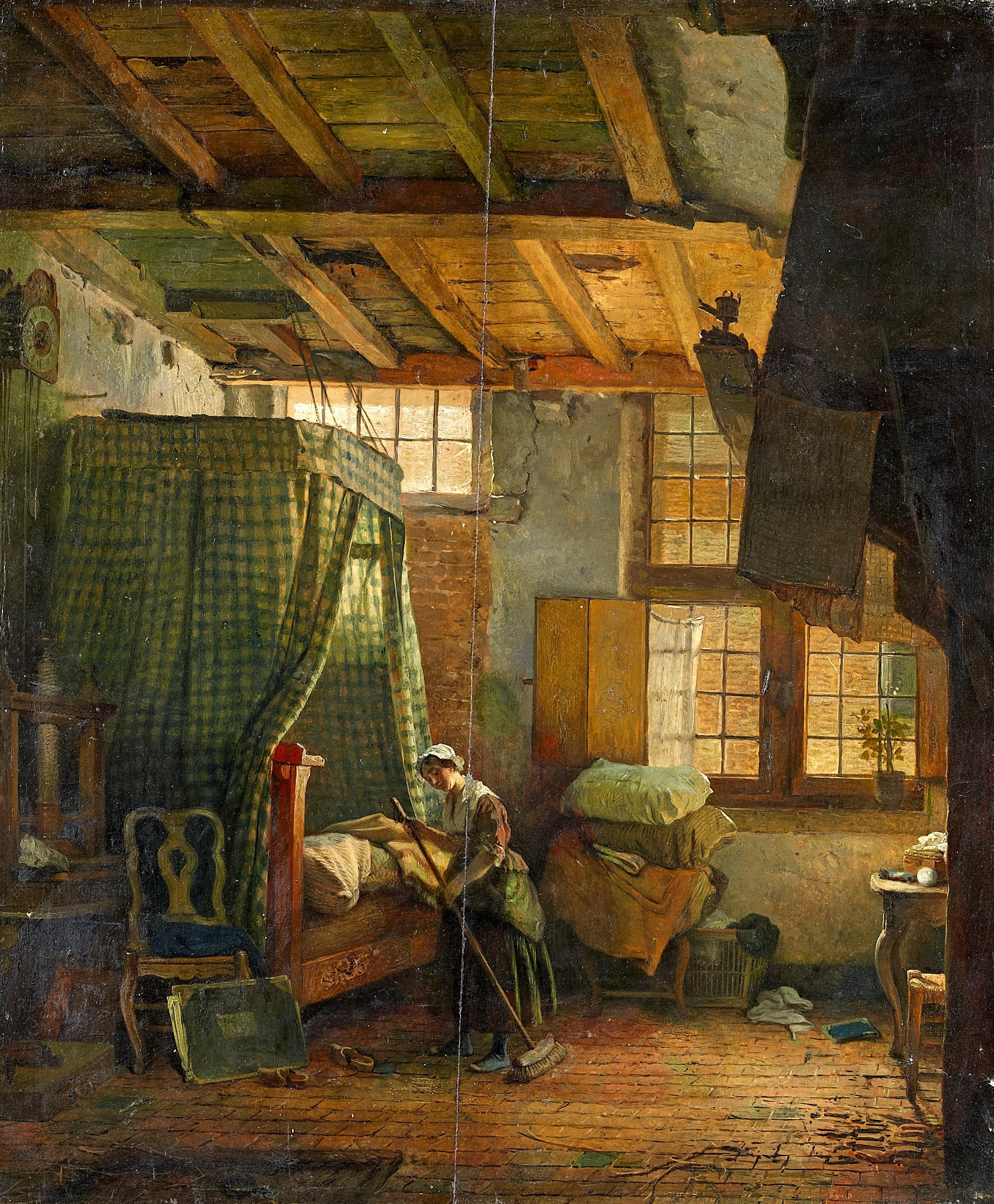
The chambermaid's household
