= Petrus Johannes van Regemorter =

Flemish painter

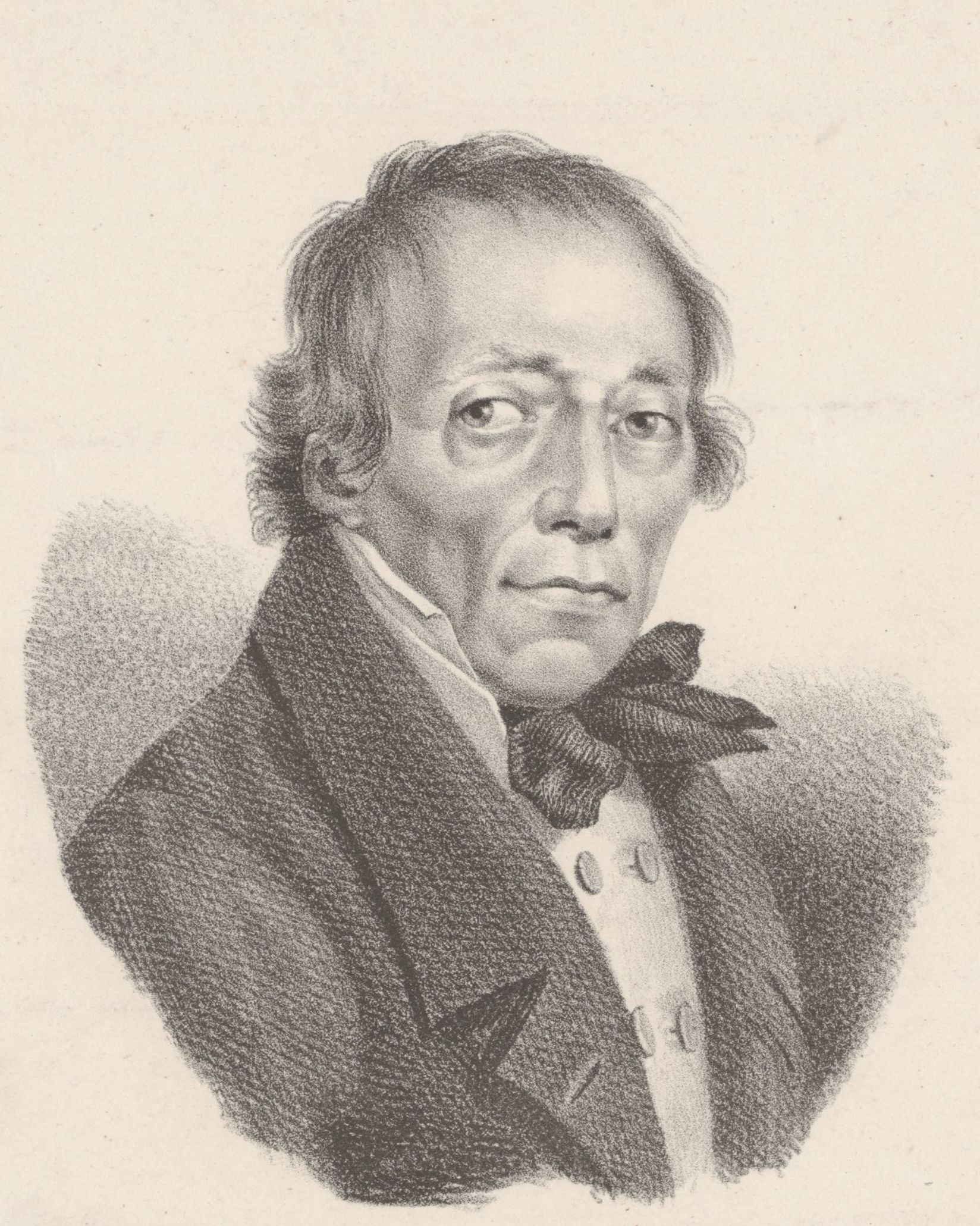
Petrus Johannes van Regemorter, by Guillaume Philidor Van den Burggraaff

Petrus Johannes van Regemorter (8 September 1755 – 17 November 1830) was a Flemish landscape and genre painter, born in Antwerp. He was a pupil of the Royal Academy of Fine Arts, but frequently studied pictures from private collections. He became a professor in the academy, and dean in the Painters' Guild in 1786. Many artists of note studied under him, and he had a large practice as a picture-restorer. In 1814 he was engaged in bringing back the pictures taken by the French to Paris. He died in 1830. In the Antwerp Museum is a Shepherd and Flock by him. He excelled in painting moonlights.

His son, also his pupil, was the painter Ignatius Josephus van Regemorter.
