= Georges Frédéric Ziesel =

Flemish painter

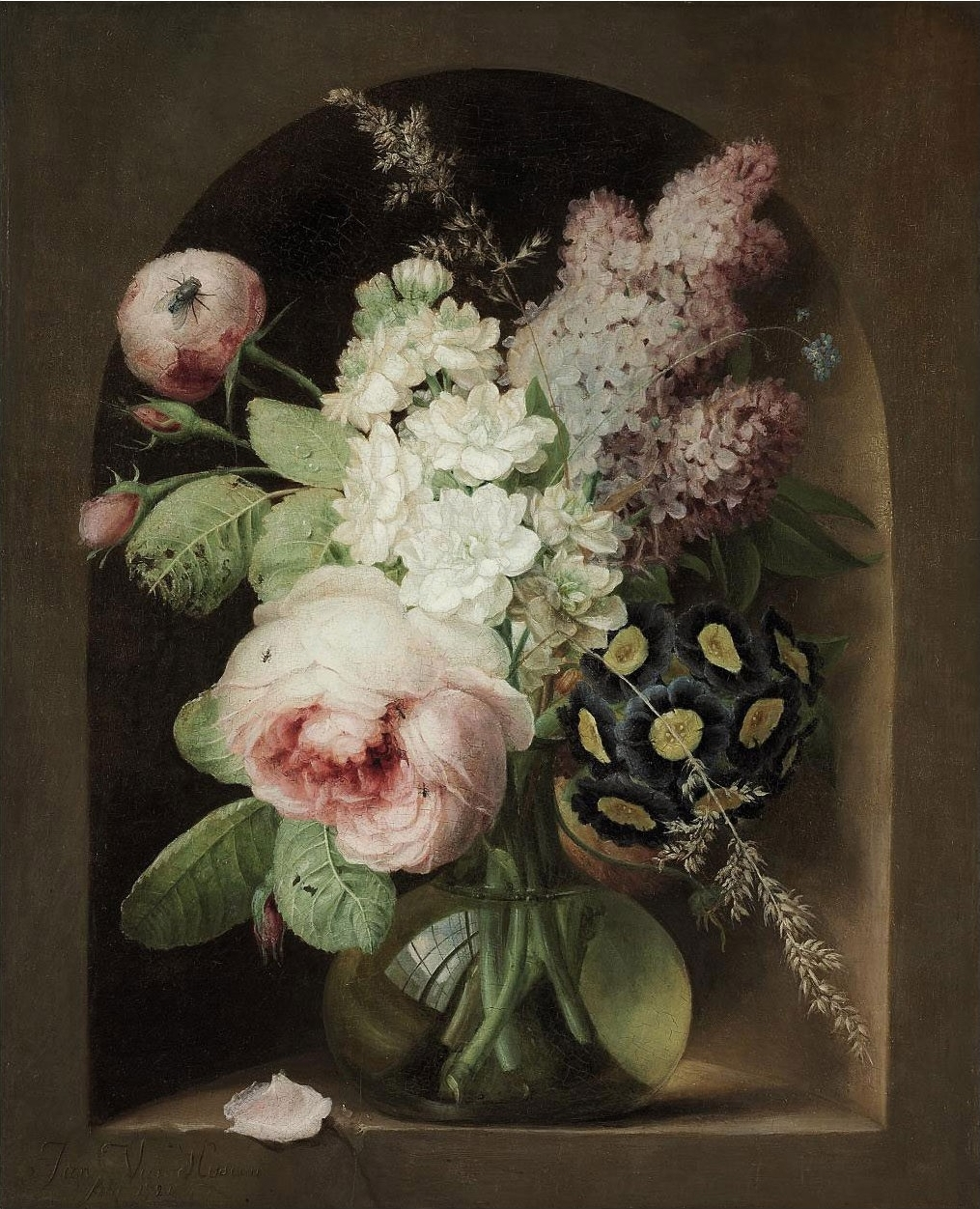
- Still-life painting by Ziesel of roses and other flowers in a glass vase in a stone niche
- Born: 15 April 1757; Hoogstraten
- Died: 26 June 1809 (aged 52); Antwerp
- Occupation: painter
- Known for: follower of Jan van Huysum
- Notable work: flower and still-life paintings

Georges Frédéric Ziesel (1757–1809), was a Flemish flower and still life painter.

== Biography ==
He was born in Hoogstraten on 15 April 1757 and became a follower of Jan van Huysum.

He died in Antwerp on 26 June 1809.
