= Marten Waefelaerts =

Flemish painter

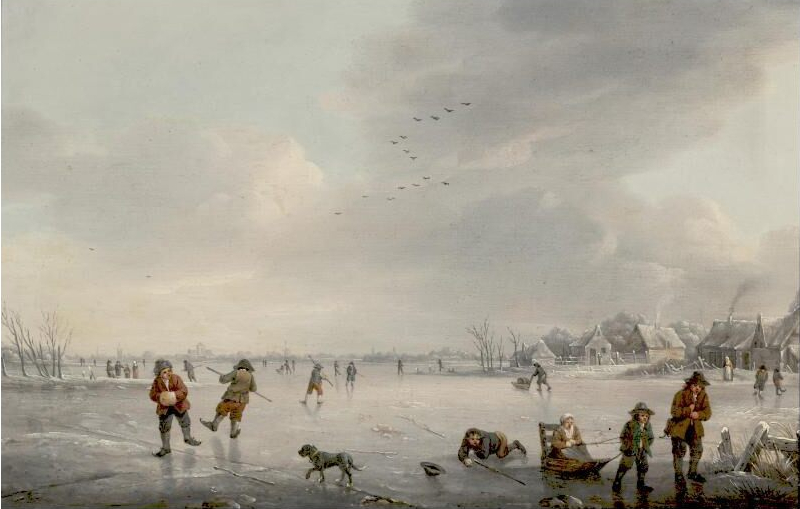
Winter landscape with ice skaters

Marten Waefelaerts (1748 - 1799) was a Flemish 18th century landscape painter living most of his life in the Holy Roman Empire. He also painted religious themes, and made engravings. Other spellings of his surname are Waeffelaer and Waffelaerts.

He was probably born in Antwerp, but little is known about his early years.

He worked in the years 1790–1800. In 1792, he exhibited three landscapes in Ghent. In 1793, the "Konstmaetschappije" showed four seascapes in the Schermer Hall in Antwerp: Ships at a stream at sunset, Ships in a turbulent river, A Dutch yacht on the Scheldt to Antwerp and The Scheldt view on a quay in Antwerp.
