= Mattheus Ignatius van Bree =

Belgian painter (1773–1839)

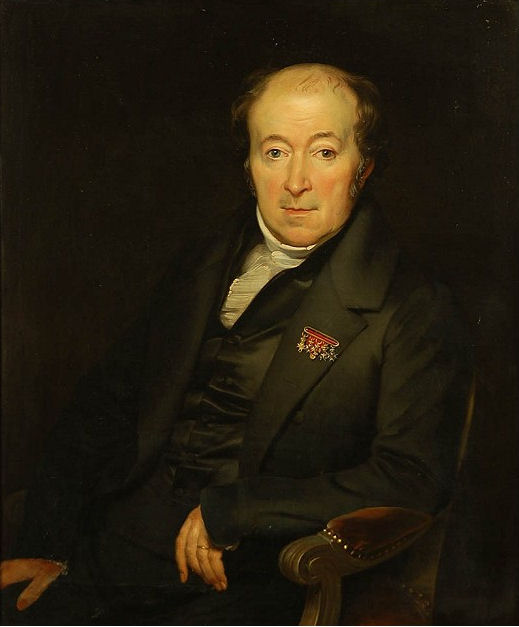
- Portrait of Mattheus Ignatius van Bree by Antoine van Ysendyck
- Born: 22 February 1773; Antwerp
- Died: 15 December 1839; Antwerp
- Occupations: Painter, sculptor, visual artist
- Relatives: Philippe-Jacques van Bree

Signature
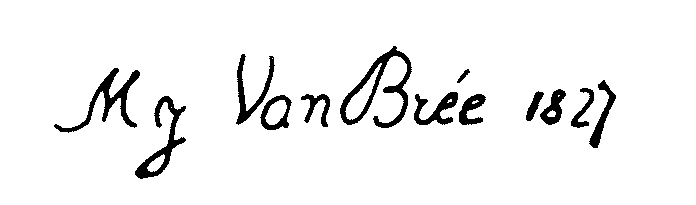

Mattheus Ignatius van Bree (22 February 1773 – 15 December 1839) was a Belgian painter. He was one of the founders of the historical school of painting in Belgium and played an important role as a teacher in the development of 19th-century Belgian art.

== Biography ==
He was first trained from the age of 10 in the local art academy. One of his teachers was Petrus Johannes van Regemorter. He became assistant-professor at the Academy and got his own studio in 1794. He left for Paris in 1797 where he studied with François-André Vincent. He participated that year in the Paris Salon and won second prize in the Prix de Rome with his painting The death of Cato in Utica.

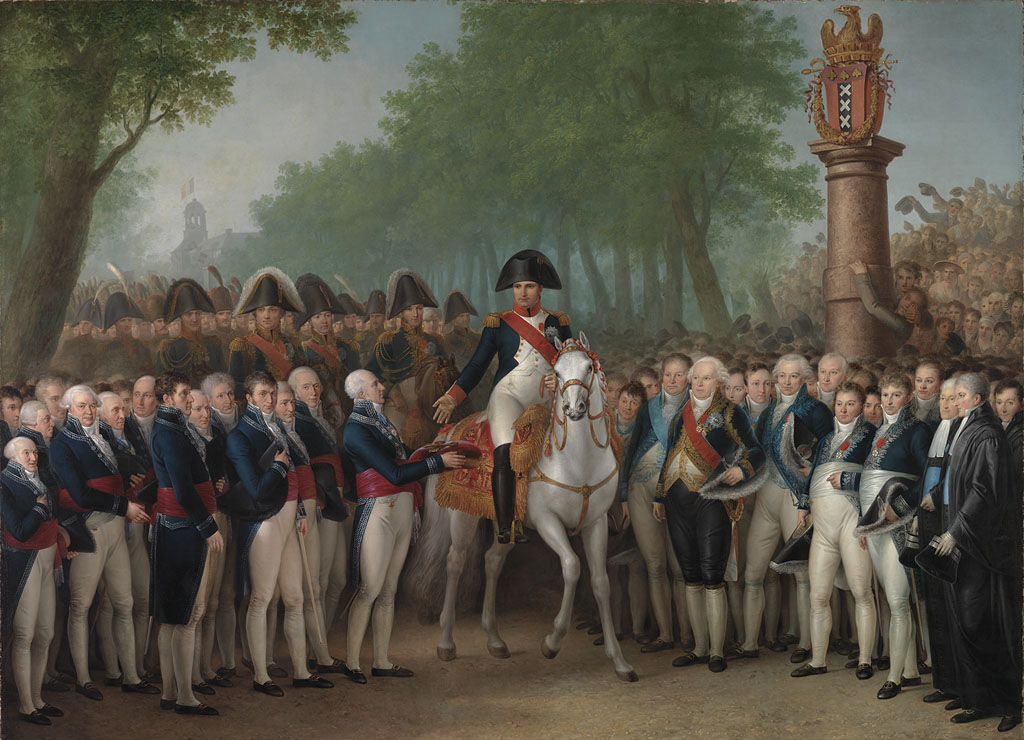
Napoleon's arrival in Amsterdam, 9 October 1811

Shortly afterwards he returned to Antwerp, becoming a teacher at the re-opened Academy in 1804. From 1801 he undertook some important commissions, for example The Arrival of the First Consul Napoleon Bonaparte at Antwerp, 18 June 1803, painted for Josephine de Beauharnais. During the period of French rule he executed historical subjects and portraits in a stark neo-classical style owing much to both David and Vincent. He served as a curator at the Museum of Fine Arts, Antwerp. Van Bree was after the end of French occupation in 1813 a member of the commission responsible for recovering works of art confiscated by the French and was able to retrieve many works by Peter Paul Rubens. In 1821 he travelled to Italy and visited Florence and Rome with his former pupil Ferdinand de Braekeleer the Elder. In Florence he made in the Uffizi drawings after portraits by Leonardo da Vinci and Raphael. In the same year he also published his views on art in Leçons de dessin (Drawing lessons).

In 1827 he became director of the Antwerp Academy after the resignation of Willem Jacob Herreyns. He was a member of several overseas art institutions such as the academies of Amsterdam, Rome, Munich and New York.

He trained some of the eminent painters of the next generation such as Egide Charles Gustave Wappers, Nicaise de Keyser, Jan August Hendrik Leys, Antoine Wiertz, Jules Victor Génisson and Ferdinand de Braekeleer the Elder in whom he instilled his admiration for the masters of the Flemish school, and in particular, Rubens and van Dyck. Egide Linnig who studied under van Bree was not happy with the emphasis placed on history painting by van Bree.

== Work ==
Initially starting out in a French neo-classical style with themes inspired by Antiquity, he changed after the expulsion of the French in 1813 to painting historical pictures based on Dutch and Flemish history. His style also became more reminiscent of Rubens in its use of looser brushwork and a warmer palette. His historical paintings were often of large dimensions and earned him a high reputation in his lifetime. He also painted more small-scale and colourful oil sketches and it is these works that are now most esteemed. He also made a few sculptures.

Among his most important works are The Patriotism of the Burgomaster Van der Werft, in the city hall of Leyden, and The Death of Rubens, in the Royal Museum of Fine Arts, Antwerp.

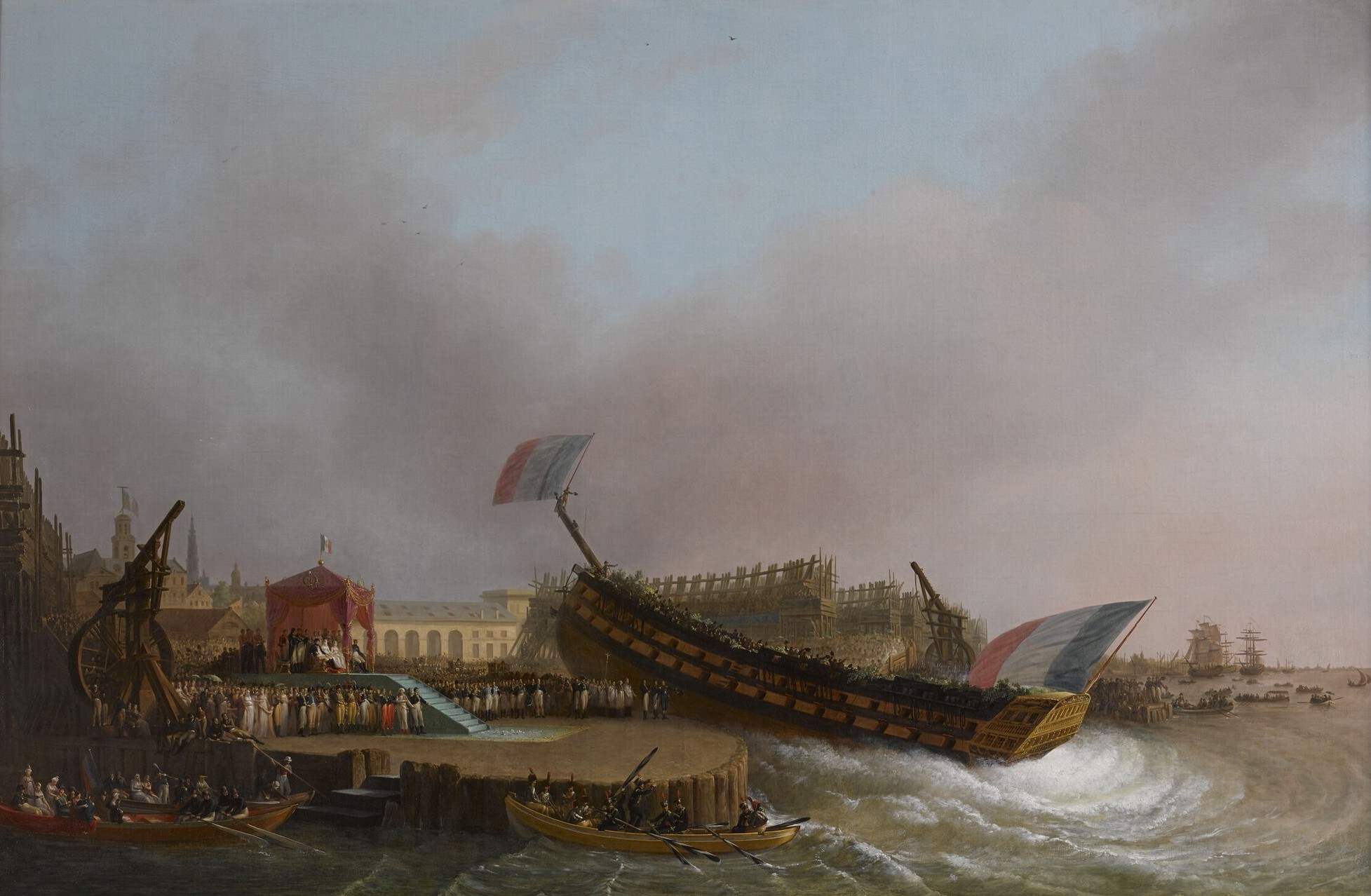
Emperor Napoleon I and the Empress, accompanied by the King and Queen of Westphalia, attending the launch of the 80-gun ship of the line Friedland at the Antwerp naval shipyard on 2 May 1810.
