= 1893 in art =

The year 1893 in art involved some significant events.

== Events ==
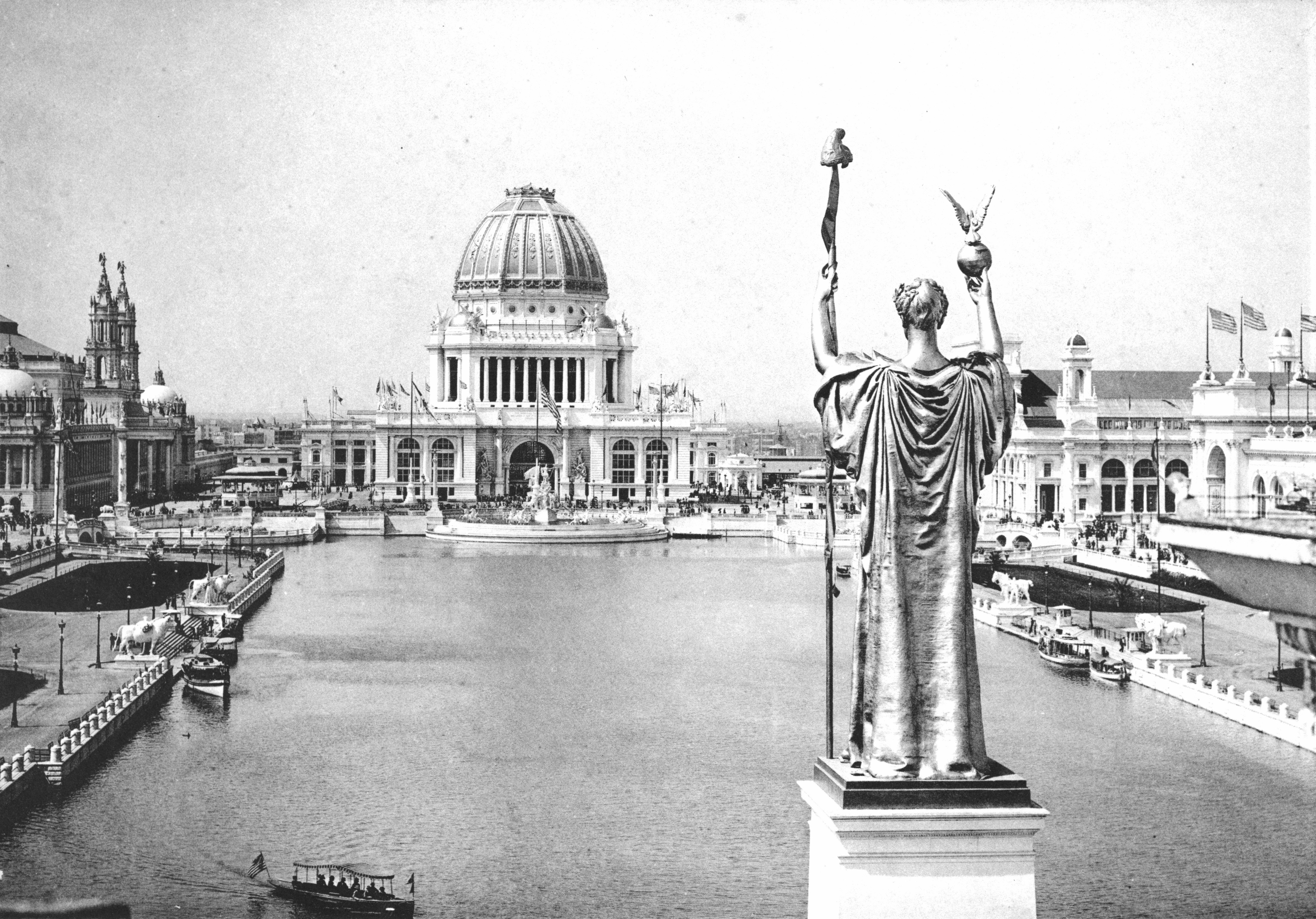
May 1: World's Columbian Exposition (Chicago) with Romanesque statue of Columbia overlooking man-made lake.

- February – Grafton Galleries open in London.
- April – The Studio: An Illustrated Magazine of Fine and Applied Art is first published in London by Charles Holme with Joseph Gleeson White as editor and a cover design by Aubrey Beardsley.
- May 1 – The 1893 World's Fair, also known as the World's Columbian Exposition, opens to the public in Chicago, USA, with a Romanesque statue of Columbia overlooking the man-made lake. The first United States commemorative postage stamps are issued for the Exposition. Among other art exhibits are two bronze calves by Anne Marie Carl-Nielsen.
- June 14 – Opening of Shelley Memorial at University College, Oxford, designed by Basil Champneys with a reclining nude marble statue of Percy Bysshe Shelley by Edward Onslow Ford.
- June 29 – Unveiling of the Shaftesbury Memorial Fountain at Piccadilly Circus in London, with a gilded aluminium statue of Anteros, designed by Alfred Gilbert and cast by Morris Singer.
- Ford Madox Brown completes painting The Manchester Murals in Manchester Town Hall (England).
- The National Sculpture Society is founded in the United States.
- Alois Riegl's Stilfragen: Grundlegungen zu einer Geschichte der Ornamentik is published in Berlin.
- Henri Rousseau gives up his job as a Paris toll collector and moves to a studio in Montparnasse where he lives and paints full-time.
- A 16th century Ardabil Carpet from Persia enters the collection of the South Kensington Museum in London.

== Exhibitions ==
- December – Unter den Linden in Berlin holds an exhibition of Edvard Munch's work, including six paintings entitled Study for a Series: Love, beginning his Frieze of Life cycle.

== Works ==
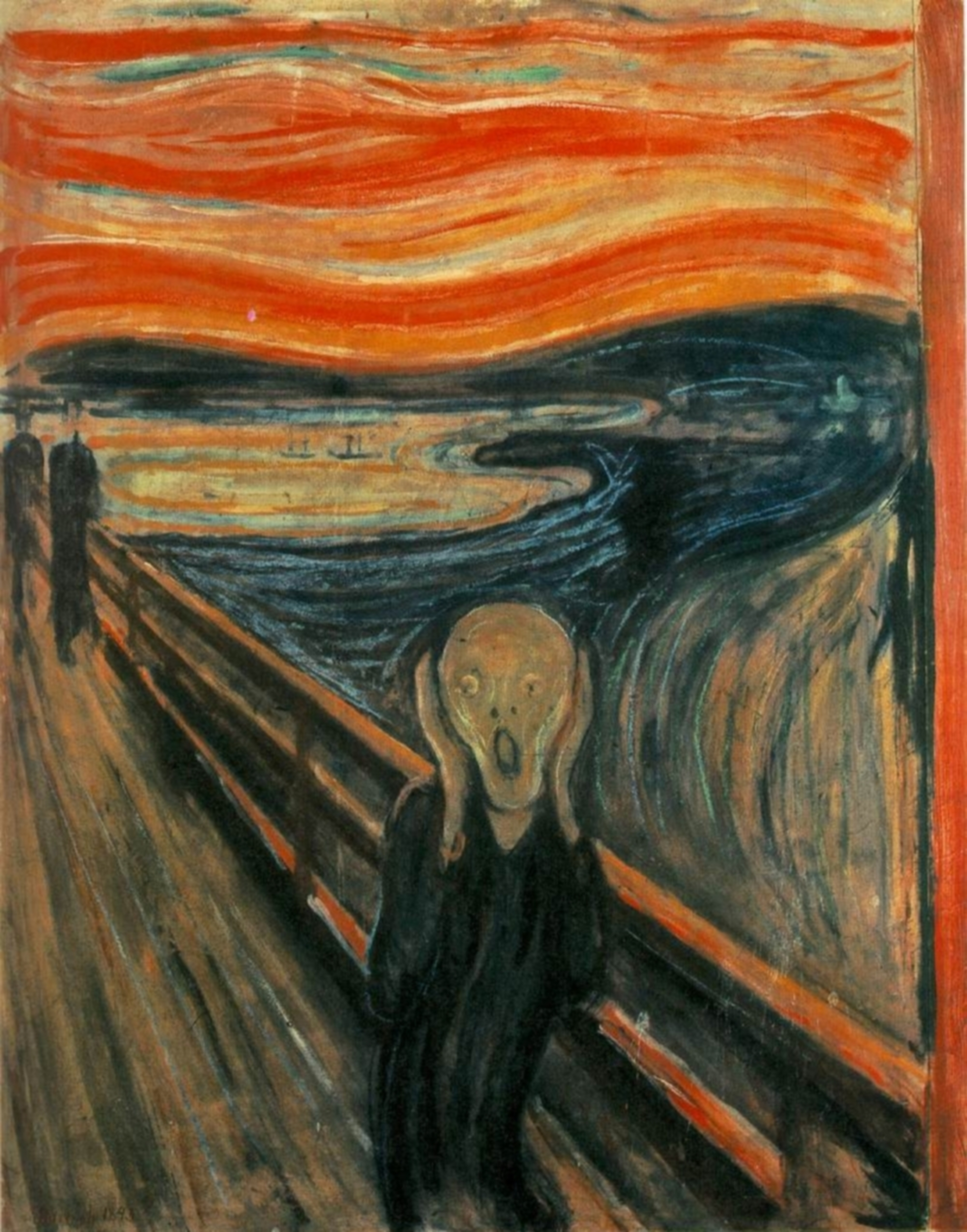
Edvard Munch – The Scream 1893

- Lawrence Alma-Tadema – Unconscious Rivals
- Léon Bakst – Self-portrait
- Charles Burton Barber – A Special Pleader
- Aubrey Beardsley – Illustrations to Malory's Le Morte d'Arthur (J. M. Dent)
- Henrique Bernardelli – Messalini
- Olga Boznańska – Self-portrait
- Edgar Bundy – Antonio Stradivari at work in his studio
- Mary Cassatt – The Child's Bath
- Paul Cézanne – Basket of Apples
- John Collier – A Glass of Wine with Caesar Borgia
- Henri-Edmond Cross – The Evening Air (approximate date)
- Ernesto de la Cárcova – Without Bread or Work
- Frank Dicksee – The Funeral of a Viking
- Albert Edelfelt
  - Larin Paraske
  - Two women with laundry
- Paul Gauguin
  - Otahi
  - Portrait of the artist in a hat
- J. W. Godward
  - A Priestess (nude version)
  - Reflections
  - Yes Or No
- Félix Resurrección Hidalgo – Adios del Sol
- Winslow Homer – The Fox Hunt
- Paul Jamin – Brennus and His Share of the Spoils
- Eero Järnefelt
  - Larin Paraske
  - Under the Yoke (Burning the Brushwood) (Raatajat rahanalaiset)

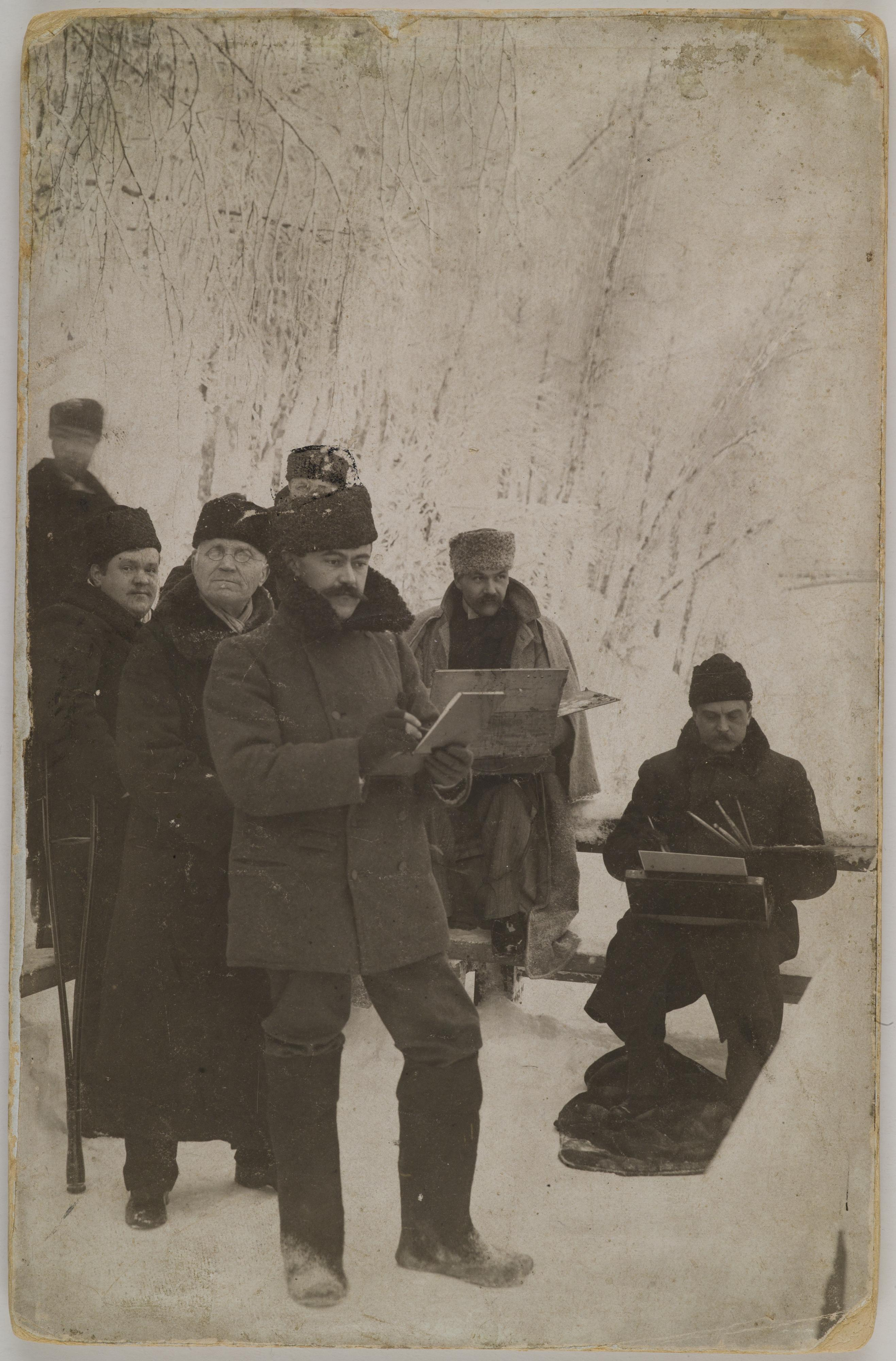
Axel Gallén, Louis Sparre and Albert Edelfelt painting at Imatra, 1893

- Christian Krohg – Leiv Eirikson Discovering America
- Peder Severin Krøyer – Summer Evening on Skagen's Southern Beach (Sommeraften på Skagen Sønderstrand med Anna Ancher og Marie Krøyer)
- Gaston La Touche – L'Ennui
- Princess Louise, Marchioness of Lorne – Statue of her mother Queen Victoria, in Kensington Gardens, London
- Hendrik Willem Mesdag – Bomschuiten in the surf, ready for departure
- John Everett Millais – Portrait of John Hare
- Albert Joseph Moore
  - An Idyll
  - The Loves of the Winds and the Seasons
- Edvard Munch
  - Death in the Sickroom
  - The Scream
  - Starry Night
- Władysław Podkowiński – Frenzy of Exultations
- Odilon Redon – Sita (pastel)
- Augustus Saint-Gaudens – Diana (bronze cast)
- Alfred Stieglitz – photographs
  - The Terminal
  - Winter – Fifth Avenue
- Franz Stuck – The Sin
- Joseph-Noël Sylvestre – François Rude working on the Arc de Triomphe
- Abbott Handerson Thayer – The Virgin
- Henri de Toulouse-Lautrec – Jane Avril (poster)
- Henry Scott Tuke – August Blue
- Raja Ravi Varma – There Comes Papa
- Stanisław Wyspiański – Self-portrait

== Births ==
=== January to June ===
- January 13 – Chaïm Soutine, painter (died 1943)
- February 2 – Sreten Stojanović, Serbian sculptor (died 1960).
- February 10 – Walter Hofer, German art dealer (died c. 1971)
- March 3
  - Ivon Hitchens, English painter (died 1979)
  - Beatrice Wood, American artist and ceramicist (died 1998)
- March 11 – Wanda Gag, children's author and artist (died 1946)
- March 22 – Bernard Fleetwood-Walker, English artist (died 1965)
- March 29 – Dora Carrington, painter and designer (died 1932)
- April 7 – Almada Negreiros, Portuguese artist (died 1970)
- April 9 – Charles E. Burchfield, American scene painter (died 1967)
- April 11 – John Nash, English painter, illustrator, and engraver (died 1977)
- April 20 – Joan Miró, Spanish painter, sculptor and ceramicist (died 1983)
- May 16 – Stella Bowen, Australian painter (died 1947)
- May 31 – Janet Sobel, born Jennie Olechovsky, Ukrainian-born American Abstract Expressionist pioneer of drip painting (died 1968)

=== July to December ===
- July 3 – Sándor Bortnyik, Hungarian painter and graphic designer (died 1976)
- July 8 – Abraham Rattner, American painter and camouflage specialist (died 1978)
- July 26 – George Grosz, German painter and draftsman (died 1959)
- September 2 – Mary Cecil Allen, Australian-born painter (died 1962)
- September 15 – Rene Paul Chambellan, American sculptor (died 1955)
- October 1 – Marianne Brandt, German painter, sculptor and designer (died 1983)
- October 8 – Orovida Camille Pissarro, English painter and etcher (died 1968)
- October 9 – Mário de Andrade, Brazilian writer and photographer (died 1945)
- November 19 – Conrad O'Brien-ffrench, British intelligence officer, mountaineer and painter (died 1986)
- December – Eugène Gabritschevsky, Russian biologist and artist (died 1979)
- December 10 – Russell Johnson, American cartoonist (died 1995)
- December 29 – Berthold Bartosch, Bohemian animator (died 1968)

=== Date unknown ===
- Otto Eppers, American cartoonist (died 1955)
- Henry Matthew Talintyre, British comic strip artist (died 1962)

== Deaths ==
- January 30 – Prince Grigory Gagarin, Russian soldier and painter (born 1811)
- February 21 – John Pettie, Scottish-born painter (born 1839)
- March 16 – William H. Illingworth, American photographer (born 1844)
- April 6 – George Vicat Cole, English painter (born 1833)
- April 18 – Anna Bilińska-Bohdanowicz, Polish painter (born 1857)
- May 8 – Adèle Kindt, Belgian portrait and genre painter (born 1804)
- August 10 – Robert Cornelius, American pioneer of photography (born 1809)
- September 25 – Albert Joseph Moore, English painter (born 1841)
- September 28 – Annie Feray Mutrie, British painter (born 1826)
- October 6 – Ford Madox Brown, French-born English painter (born 1821)
- October 10 – Barthélemy Menn, Swiss plein air painter and draughtsman (born 1811)
- October 13 – Atkinson Grimshaw, English painter noted for nocturnal townscapes (born 1836)
- October 29 – Gustav Mützel, German animal painter (born 1839)
- December 10 – Josephine Calamatta, French painter and engraver (born 1817)
- December 23 – Gunnar Berg, Norwegian painter (born 1863)
