= Oojah =

Comic strip character

Oojah was an Elephant comic strip character as featured in the Daily Sketch Newspaper and various children's books.

== Origins ==
The first Oojah comic strip was issued on 18 February 1919. By the early 1920s, the newspaper was issuing a 4-page 'The Oojah Paper' supplement starting Saturday, 8 October 1921. It later became 'The Oojah Sketch' that ran until 23 November 1929, the 4-page section reduced to 3 pages from 29 April 1922 and 2 pages from 22 July 1922.

Other characters were Snooker, a small black cat who always wears bedsocks and lives with the Great Oojah and Don, a little boy who is the Little Oojah and the Jum-Jarum. Later, additional characters included Jerrywangle (aka Jerry), the Oojah's elephant nephew who was always up to mischief with his tricks, as well as Lord Lion and his family.

The character name for the large elephant that came to be known simply as 'Oojah' is quoted as initially being 'Flip-Flap the Great Oojah'. The 'Oojah House' book gives this description: 'FLIP-FLAP is a magic elephant who lives in a strange animal-country called Oojahland. He is the Great Oojah.' Later annuals and comic strips name him 'Uncle Oojah'.

There are some phrases that are mentioned frequently in the stories, such as exclamations by Snooker the cat with "My Bedsocks!", "My Whiskers!" and The Oojah himself with "Lovey-lovekins!" and "Jimmy-ninnikins!"

== Revival Years ==
The series was revived as the comic strip 'The Wonderful Adventures of Jerry, Don and Snooker' running for 203 episodes from 27 February 1954 to 11 January 1958. 'Jerry's Jolly Jingles' featuring Jerry, Oojah's cousin, ran for another seven months. This was the last issued of the Oojah series.

== The Artists ==
Thomas Maybank (full name Hector Thomas Maybank Webb), born in Beckenham, Kent, on 29 February 1869, was the original artist for the series. He died on 27 March 1929. The 1929 annual featured Maybank's artwork; the 1934 annual featured artwork credited to the initials JHL. Later, H. M. Talintyre (full name Henry Matthew Talintyre) continued the series in the same style until the early 1950s.

== Oojah Annuals and Books ==
The Oojah series' first appearances were in the children's annual 'Once Upon a Time - Hulton's Children's Annual 1920' firstly with a story entitled 'Flip-Flap The Great Oojah' and also one called 'The Pigmy Pirates'. In the 'Once Upon a Time - Hulton's Children's Annual 1921' a 27-page story appeared entitled "Flip-Flap in Wangletown" which included a colour plate entitled "The Band will now Sing a Dance", and secondly with a 23-page story "The Wonder-man" including a further colour plate "The Rabbits were playing 'Oranges and Lemons'". Oojah's third annual appearance was the 1921 issued 'The Joy Book Children's Annual 1922' with a full story entitled 'Flip Flap In London Town'. The stories in all three annuals were told by Flo Lancaster and pictured by Thomas Maybank.

A slim 36-page book of annual size entitled 'Oojah House - The Story of Flip-Flap's Little Mansion' was issued by E. Hulton in 1921-22 featuring just a long Oojah story. The cover states it was part of the 'Oojah Books' series which included a tracing book 'Baby Binky's Birthday' which did not feature Oojah.

The first proper annual was 'The Oojah Annual', issued in 1922 as the undated 1923 annual. This features an advert for the 1923 Joy Book on the back so it could be dated correctly. The undated 1924 Annual features a Portcullis with the cat Snooker with a coffee pot on his head. The undated 1925 Annual features a baby bear being spoonfed. The undated 1926 Annual features Oojah sitting on a stile wearing a hat.

Further annuals and books were issued featuring Thomas Maybank's artwork including the 1927 'The Oojah's Treasure Trunk' (dated from the late 1926 competition ending date inside) and the 1928 issued 'Uncle Oojah's Big Annual' (dated from having a 1929 calendar throughout the book).

Later Oojah Annuals featuring mostly the H. M. Talintyre artwork continued intermittently from the 1930s to the early 1950s.
