= Antoine Brice =

Belgian painter (1752–1817)

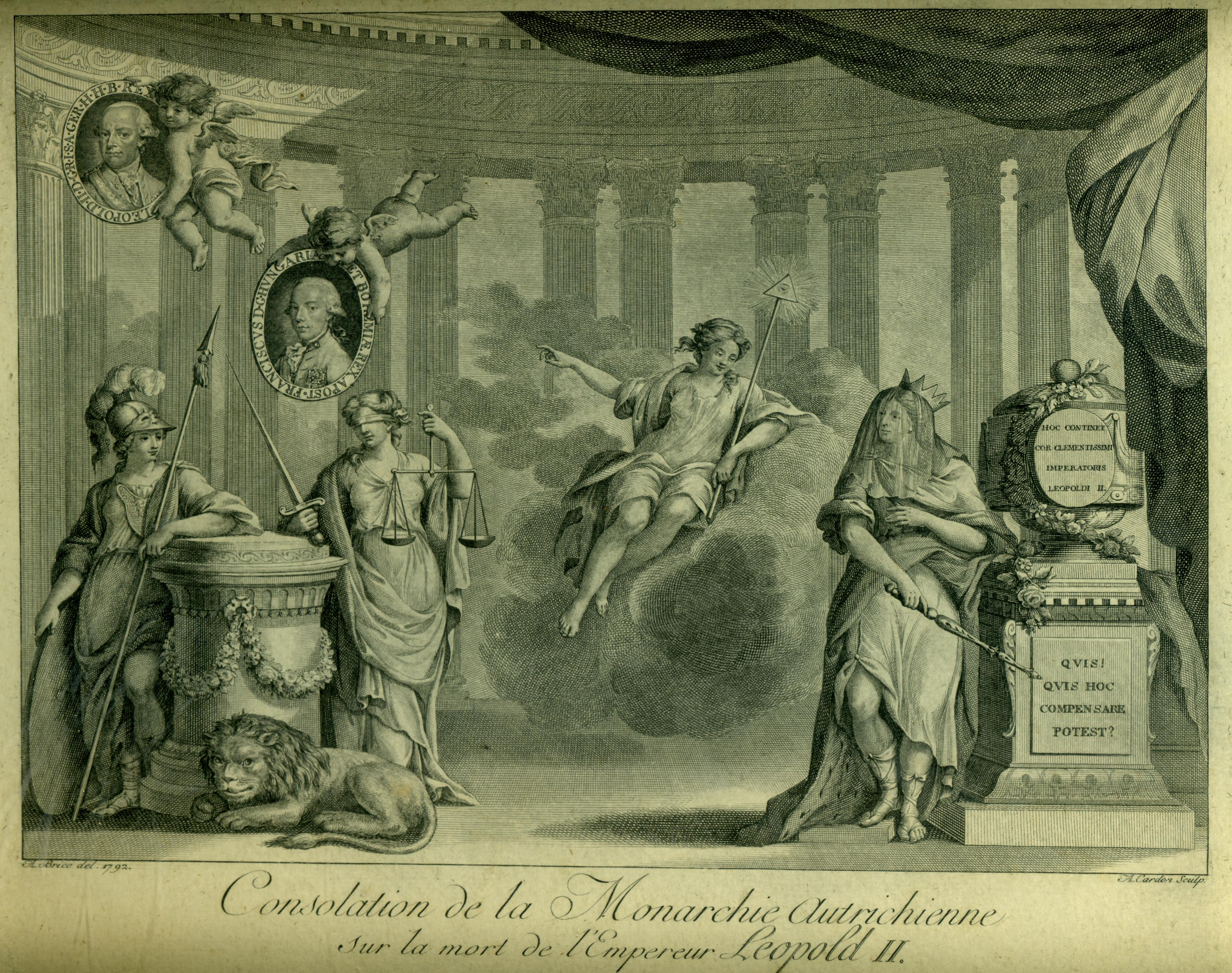
Drawing by Antoine Brice engraved by Antoine Cardon, Consolation of the Austrian Monarchy on the death of emperor Leopold II

Antoine Brice (26 May 1752, in Brussels, Austrian Netherlands – 23 January 1817, in Brussels, United Kingdom of the Netherlands) was a painter from Brussels.

== Life ==
Antoine Brice was the son of the painter Pierre-François Brice, working in the entourage of Prince Charles Alexander of Lorraine, and his own son Ignace also became a painter. Antoine began his training as a painter under his father at the Brussels Court and was made a master by the Corporation of Painters of Brussels on 5 February 1783. In the meantime he had also followed a more classical training at the Academy of Painting, Sculpture and Architecture of Brussels, where he won first prize in 1776. This training and the entourage of the governor-general's court led him, at the end of the 18th century and the end of the Austrian regime in Brussels, to become a kind of official painter to the city's aristocratic circles.

He became a professor at the Brussels academy and there headed a course on classical art and the principals of drawing. His students included Jean Baptiste Madou. In 1810 he joined with the painters Antoine Cardon, Charles Verhulst and François-Joseph Navez to found a "Société des Amateurs d'Arts".
