= Portrait of Jacques-Louis David =

Painting by François-Joseph Navez

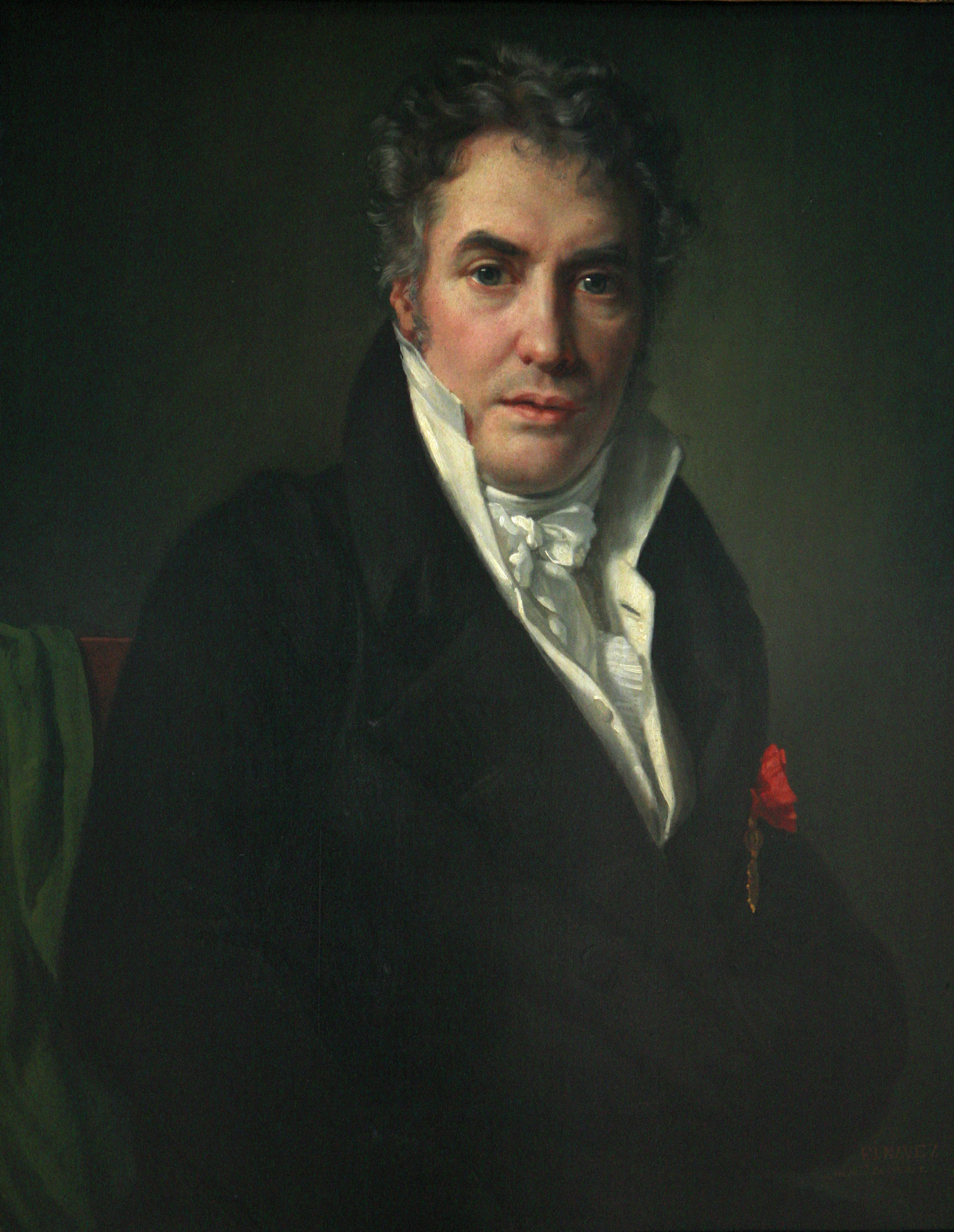
- Artist: François-Joseph Navez
- Year: 1817
- Type: Oil on panel, portrait painting
- Dimensions: 74.5 cm × 59.5 cm (29.3 in × 23.4 in)
- Location: Royal Museums of Fine Arts, Brussels

Portrait of Jacques-Louis David is an 1817 portrait painting by the Belgian artist François-Joseph Navez. It depicts the French painter Jacques-Louis David towards the end of his career. Navez had been David's pupil for several years and accompanied him in his exile to Brussels following the downfall of Napoleon's regime. Although Navez has won a scholarship to Rome, he delayed his departure to spend two further years working with David. He later served as director of Belgian Royal Academy from 1835 to 1862.

Several versions of the painting exist, with one in the Royal Museums of Fine Arts of Belgium in Brussels and another in the Clark Art Institute in Massachusetts.

== Bibliography ==
- Bordes, Phillipe. Jacques-Louis David: Empire to Exile. Yale University Press, 2007.
- Crow, Thomas. Restoration: The Fall of Napoleon in the Course of European Art, 1812-1820. Princeton University Press, 2023.
