= François-Joseph Navez =

Belgian painter (1787–1869)

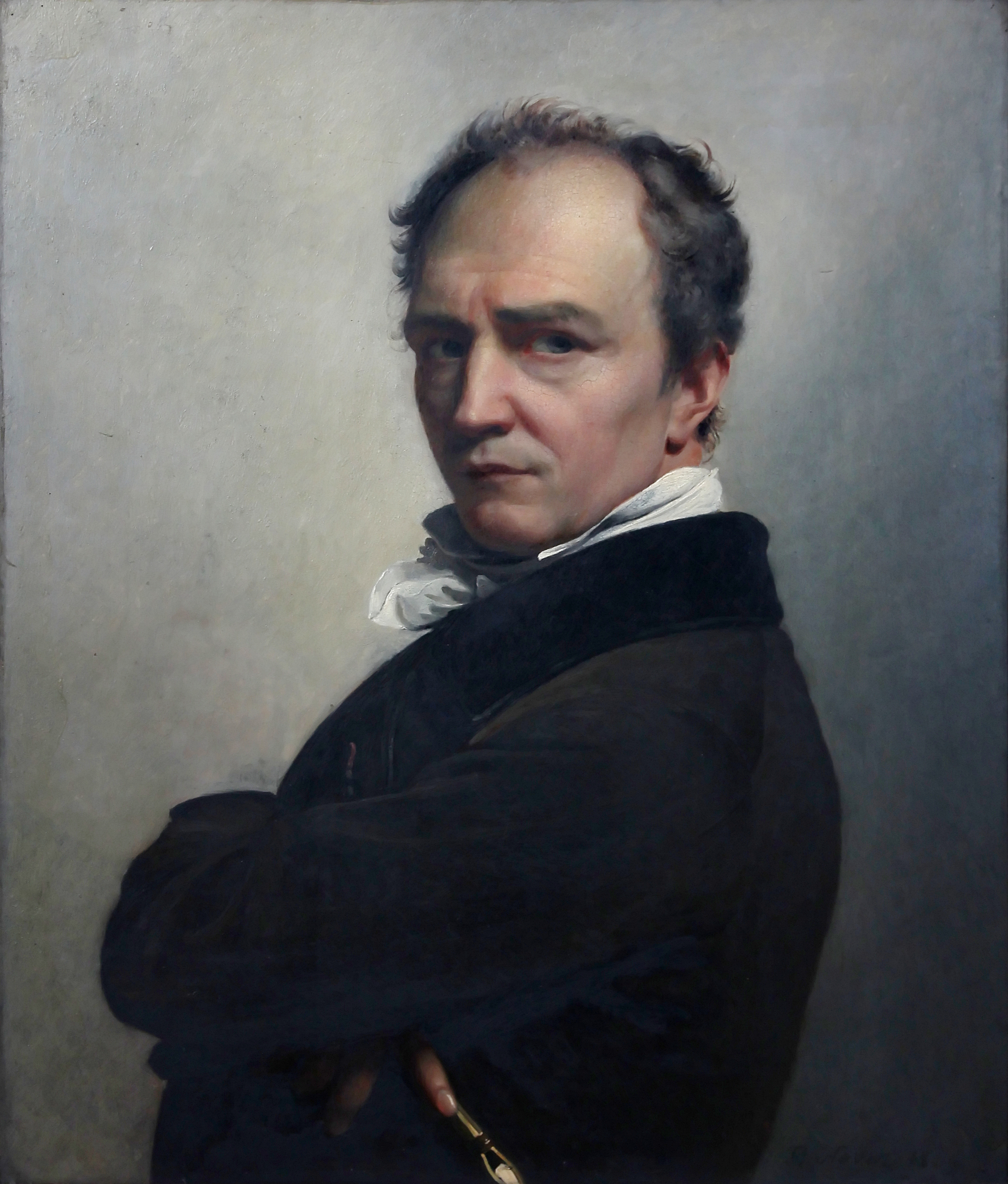
- Self-portrait (1826)
- Born: 16 November 1787; Charleroi, Austrian Netherlands
- Died: 12 October 1869 (aged 81); Brussels, Belgium
- Resting place: Laeken Cemetery
- Education: Brussels Royal Academy of Fine Arts
- Occupation: Painter
- Spouse: Augustine-Flore de Lathuy

François-Joseph Navez (16 November 1787 – 12 October 1869) was a Belgian Neoclassical painter; known for his portraits and genre scenes.

== Biography ==
As the son of an alderman, in a privileged family, he was able to devote himself entirely to art from an early age. From 1803 to 1808, he was a pupil at the Royal Academy of Fine Arts in Brussels, where he studied with Pierre Joseph Célestin François. In 1810, together with Antoine Brice and Antoine Cardon, among others, he helped create the "Société des amateurs d'arts".

In 1812, he was awarded first prize in a contest for history painting. This enabled him to go to Paris, where he worked and studied with Jacques-Louis David from 1813 to 1816. The following year he went to Rome, where he made the acquaintance of Ingres. He would live and work there until 1822.

Upon returning to Belgium, he set up a studio. In 1825, he married Augustine-Flore de Lathuy (1798-1867), the daughter of a judge. When he became established, he began taking students. Alfred Cluysenaar, Fanny Geefs and Auguste Danse were among the more notable. In 1852, his best-known student, Jean-François Portaels, married his daughter Marie-Hélène (1828-1855).

Navez was elected a fourth class member of the Royal Institute of the Netherlands in 1826, he became a supernumerary associate in 1841 and resigned in 1851. In 1830, he was named a member of his alma-mater, the Royal Academy. He was one of the founding members of the Royal Monument Commission, created in 1835. That same year, he was appointed Director of the Royal Academy.

During the 1850s, he lost several close friends and family members. In 1863, he resigned from the Academy, citing health problems. He died in 1869, in the company of Portaels and his wife's relatives, and was interred at Laeken Cemetery. Streets have been named after him in Charleroi and Schaerbeek.

== Main works ==
- 1816: Sainte Véronique de Milan, Museum of Fine Arts, Ghent.
- 1816: La Famille de Hemptinne, Royal Museums of Fine Arts of Belgium, Brussels.
- 1819: Scène de musique, Museum of Grenoble.
- 1821: Scène de brigands, Private collection.
- 1829: La Nymphe Salmacis et Hermaphrodite, Museum of Fine Arts, Ghent.
- 1830: Songe d'Athalie, Royal Museums of Fine Arts of Belgium, Brussels.
- 1831: Portrait d'un jeune homme songeur, Louvre, Paris.
- 1832: Portrait of Theodore-Joseph Jonet and his two daughters, Groeningemuseum, Bruges.
- 1836: Portrait de David, Montreal Museum of Fine Arts.
- 1844: Notre-Dame des Affligés, Church of Saint-Antoine de Padoue, Charleroi.

== Gallery ==
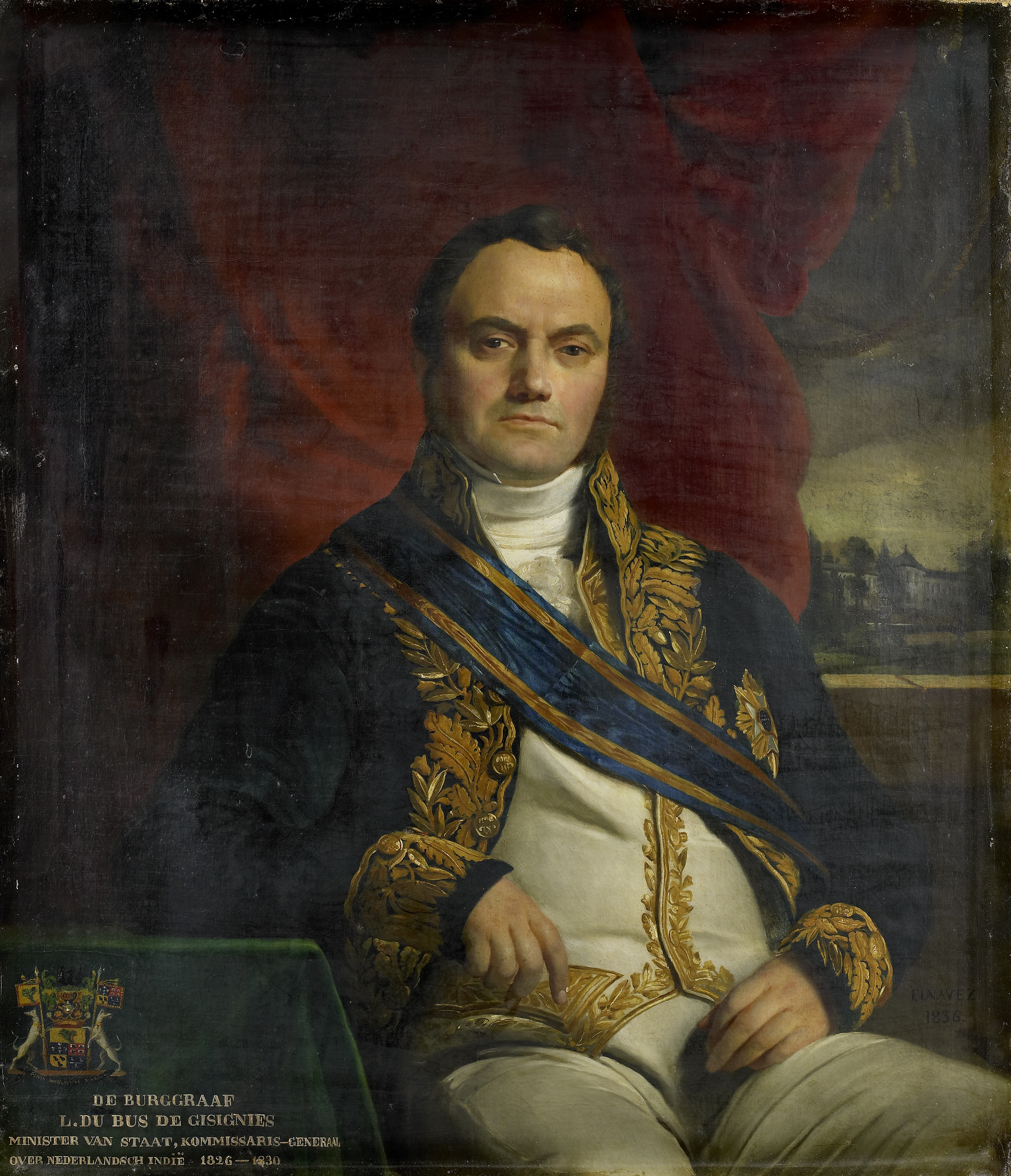
Leonard du Bus de Gisignies (1836)

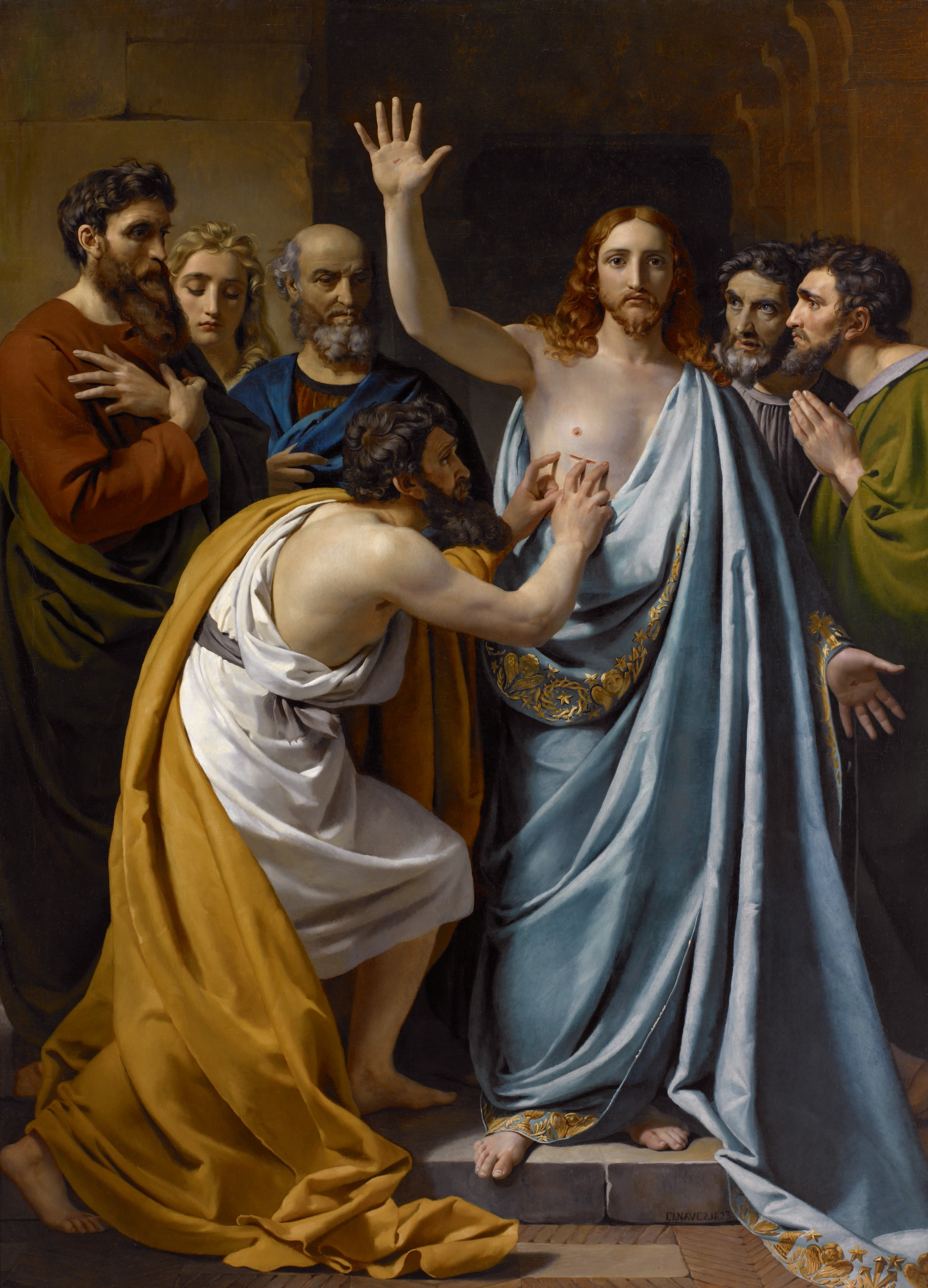
The Incredulity of
St. Thomas (1823)

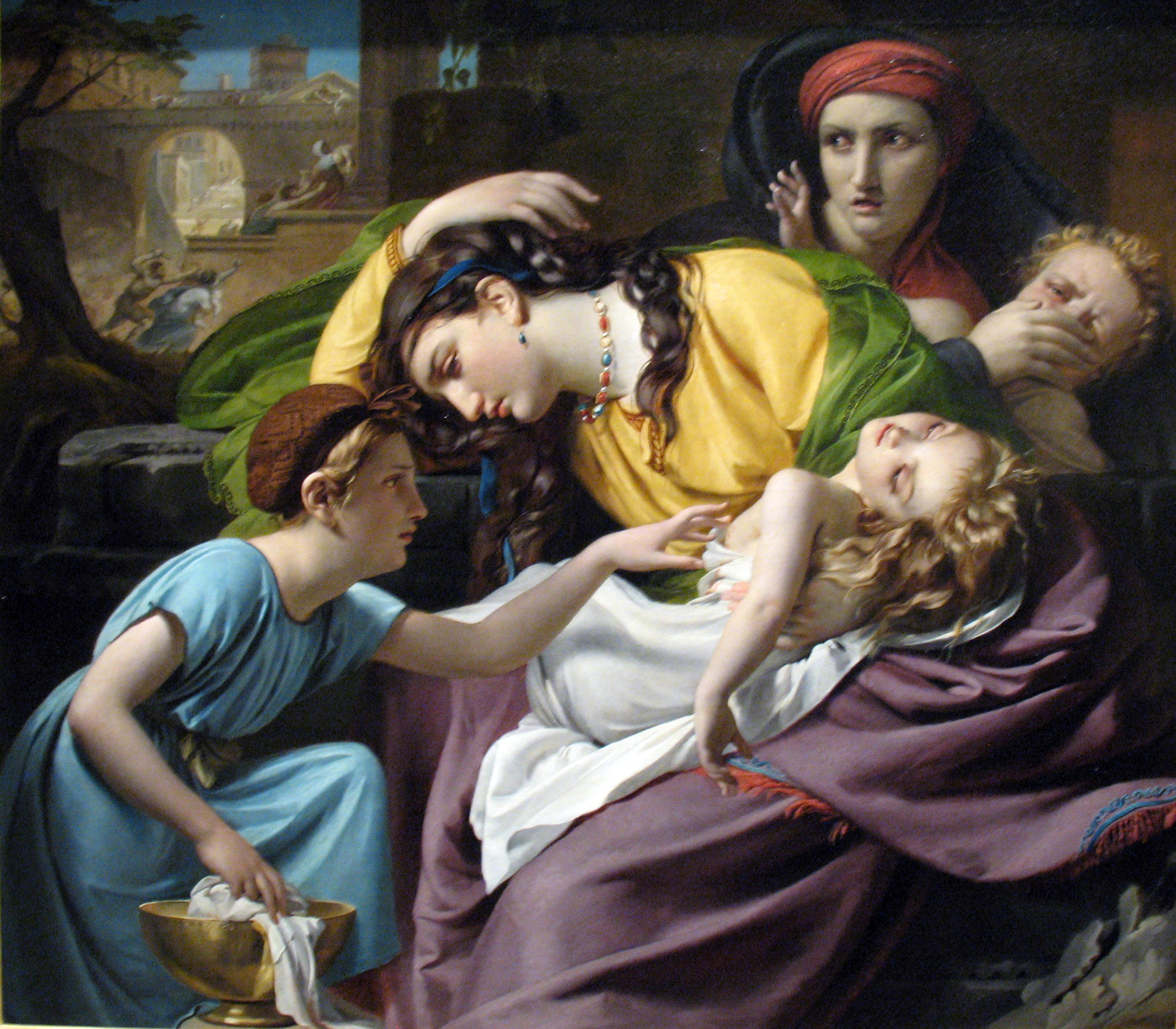
Massacre of the Innocents (1824)

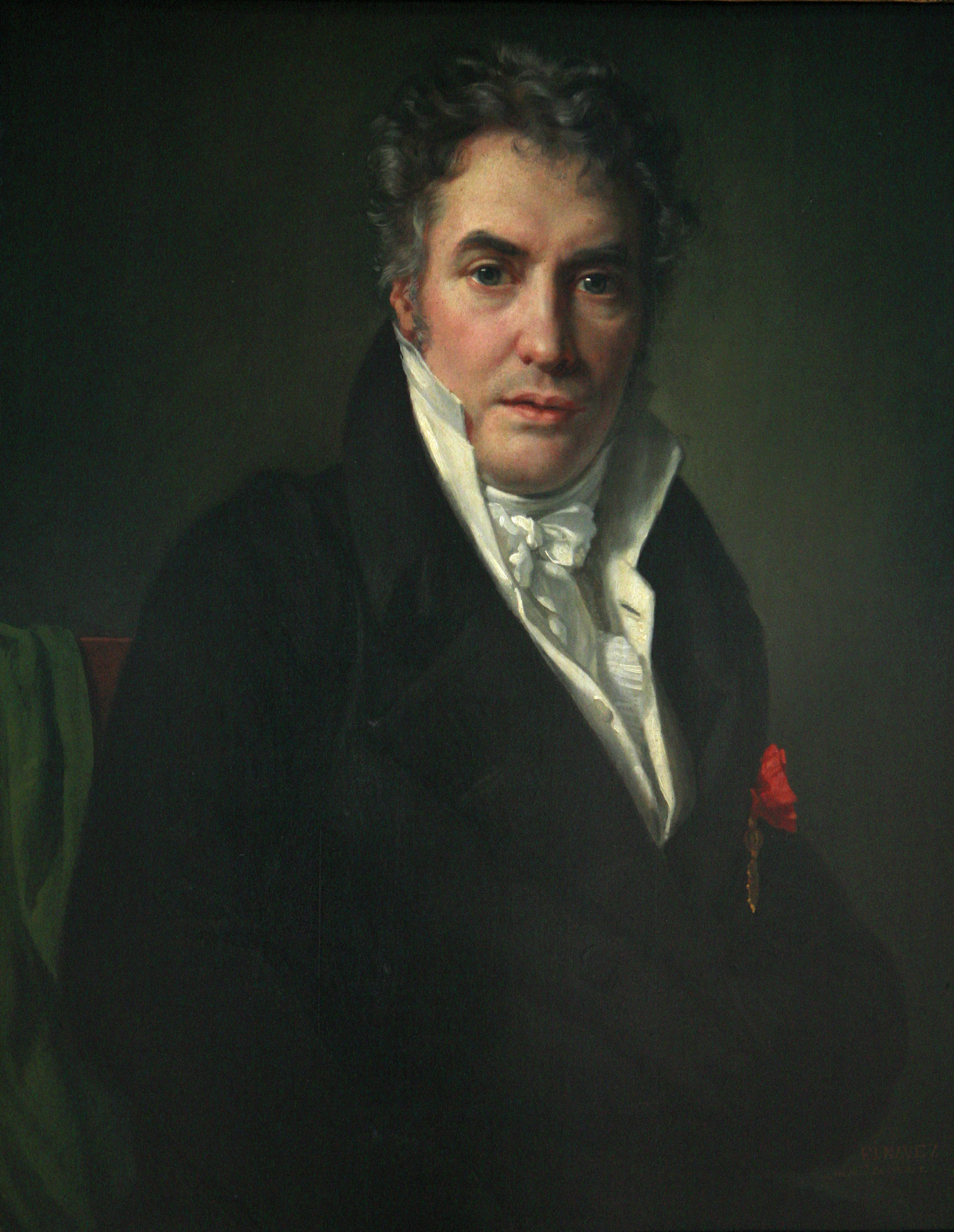
Portrait of Jacques-Louis David (1817)

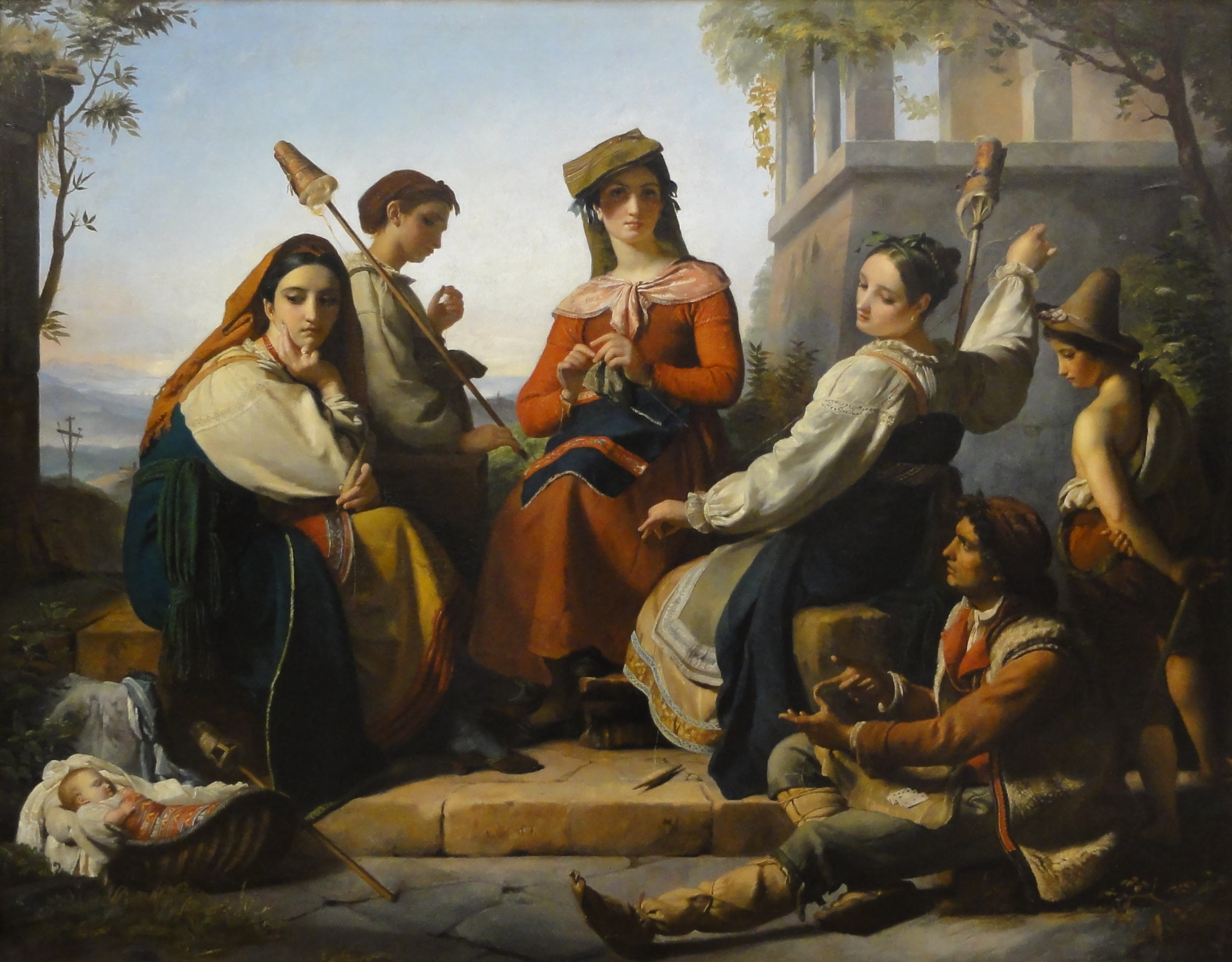
The Spinners of Fondi (1845)

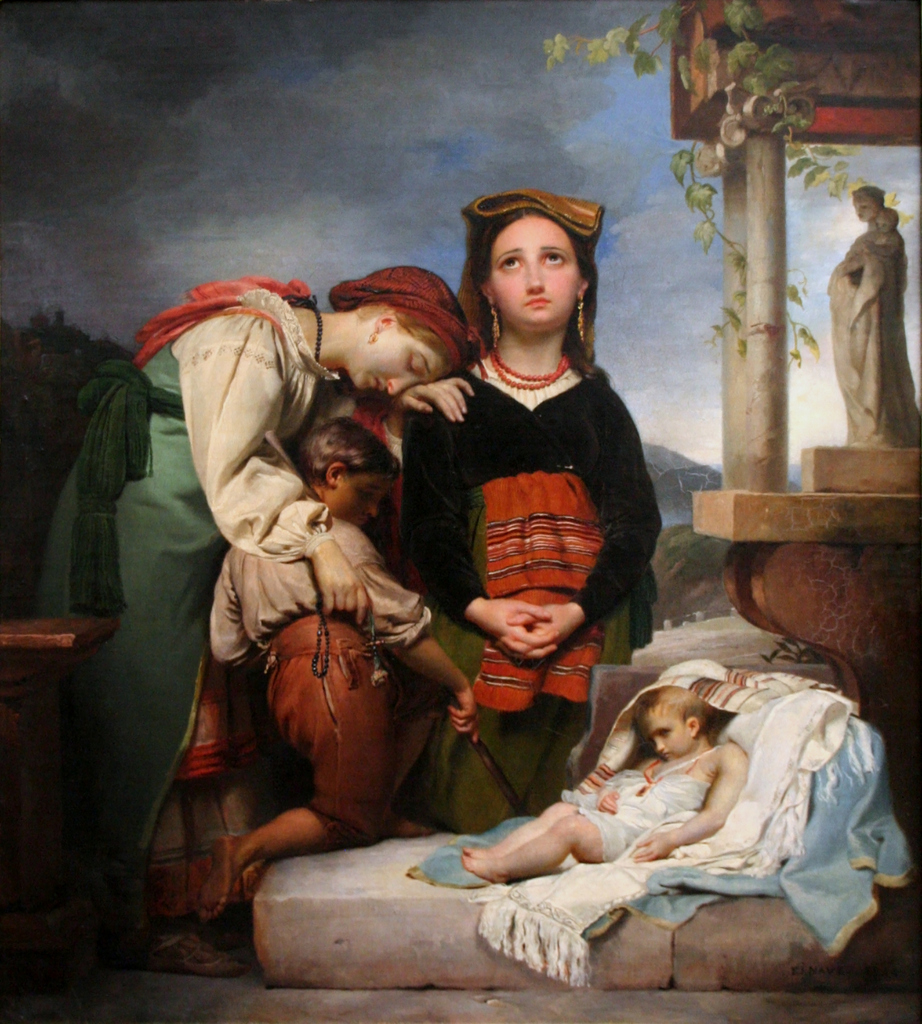
The Sick Child (1844)

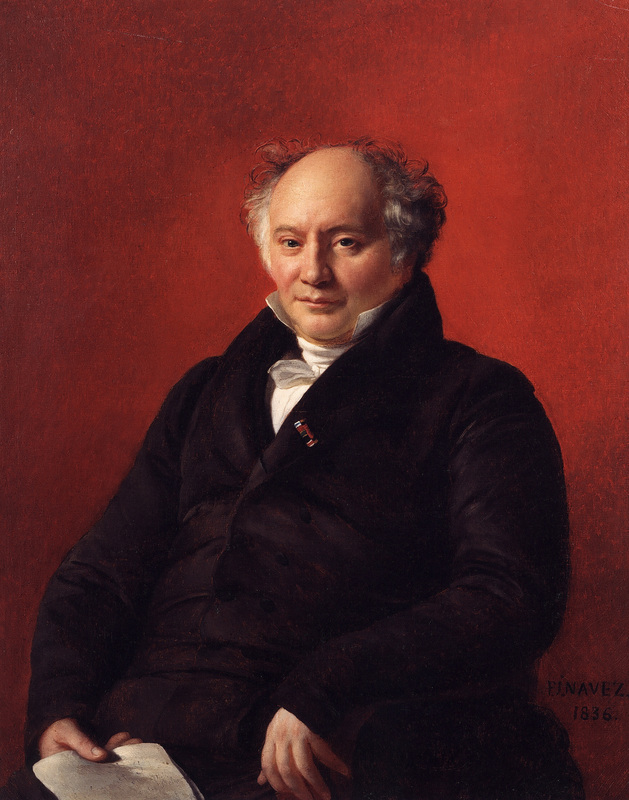
Goswin de Stassart (1836)

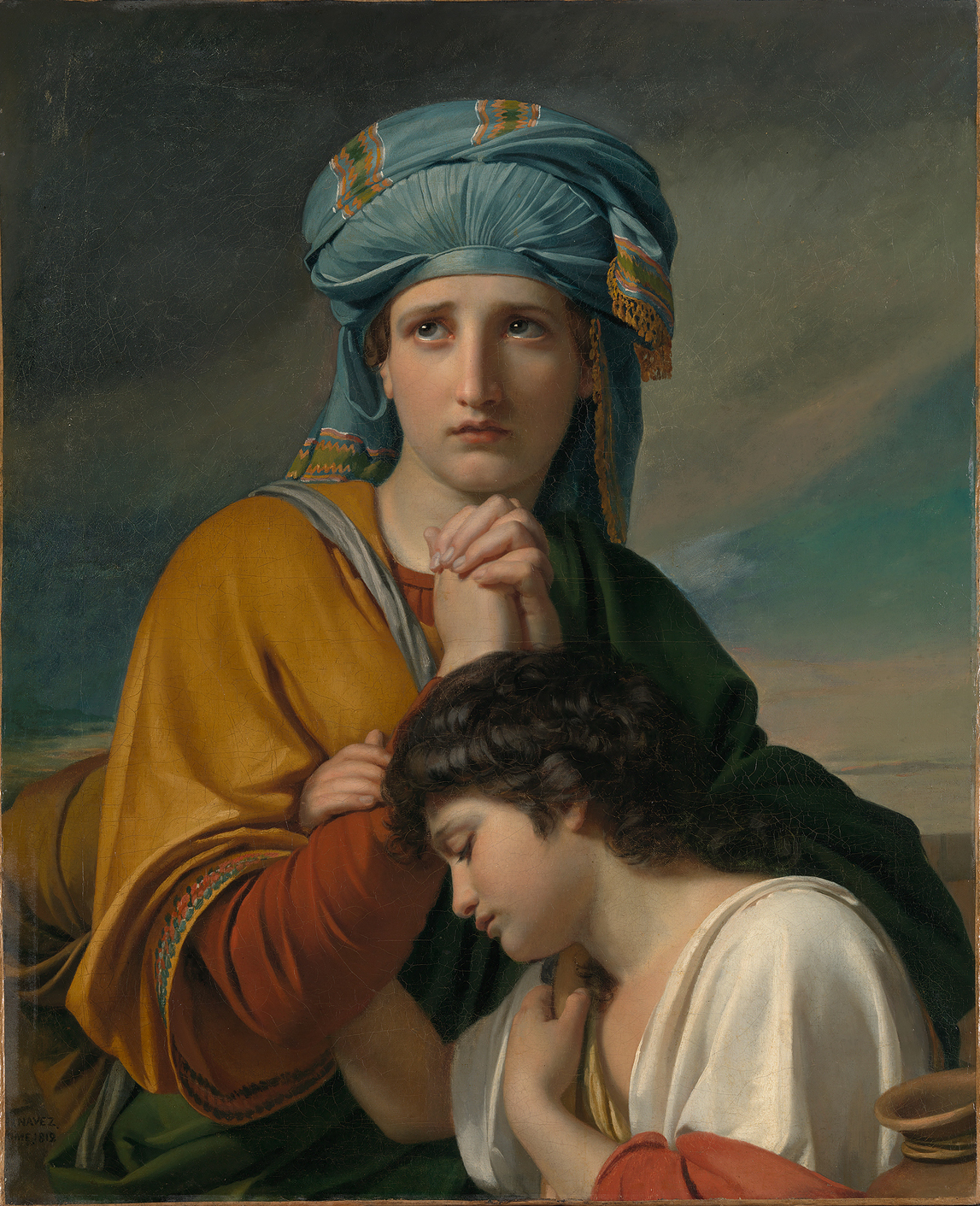
Hagar in the desert (1819)

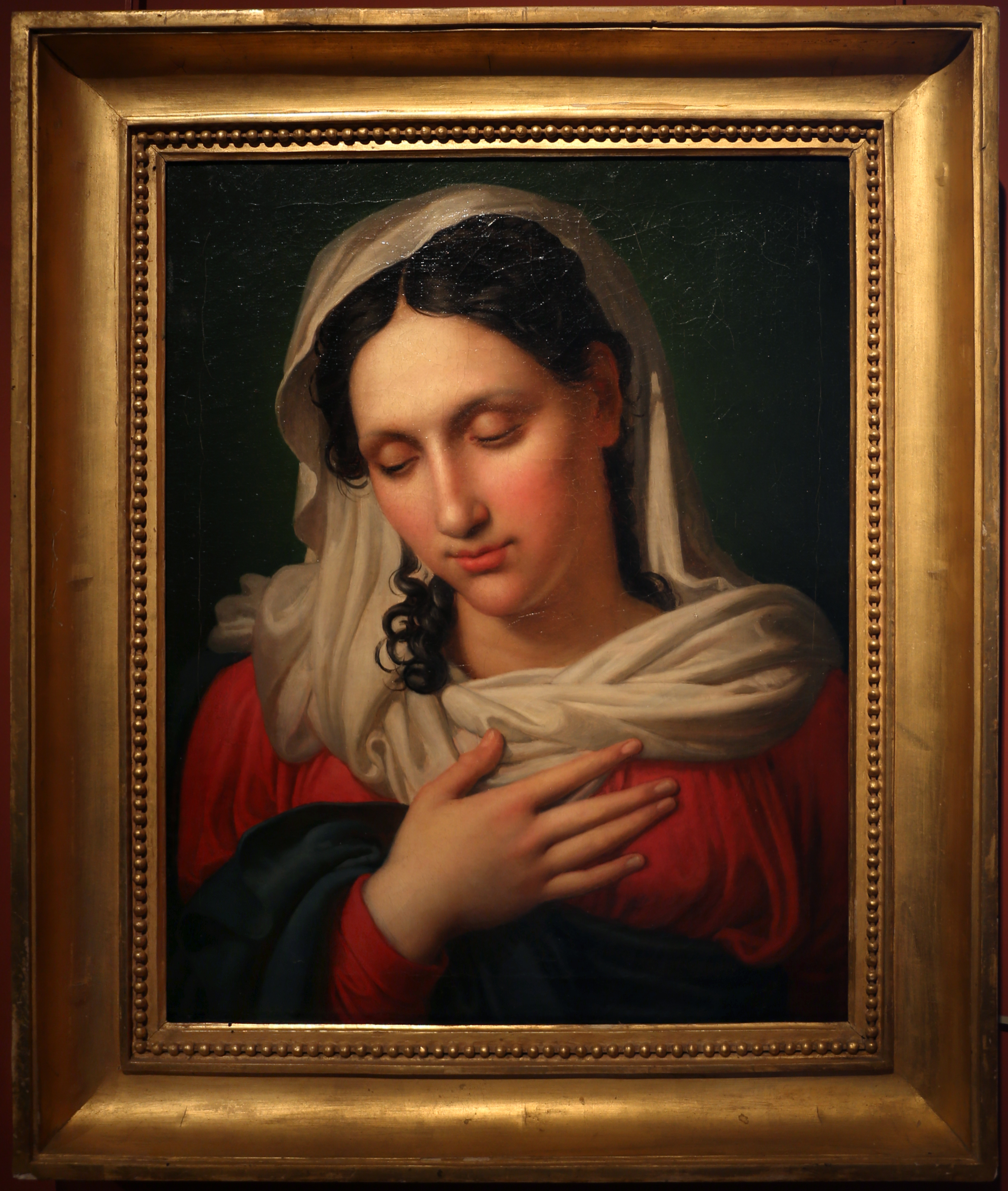
Bust of the Virgin (Our Lady of Sorrows)

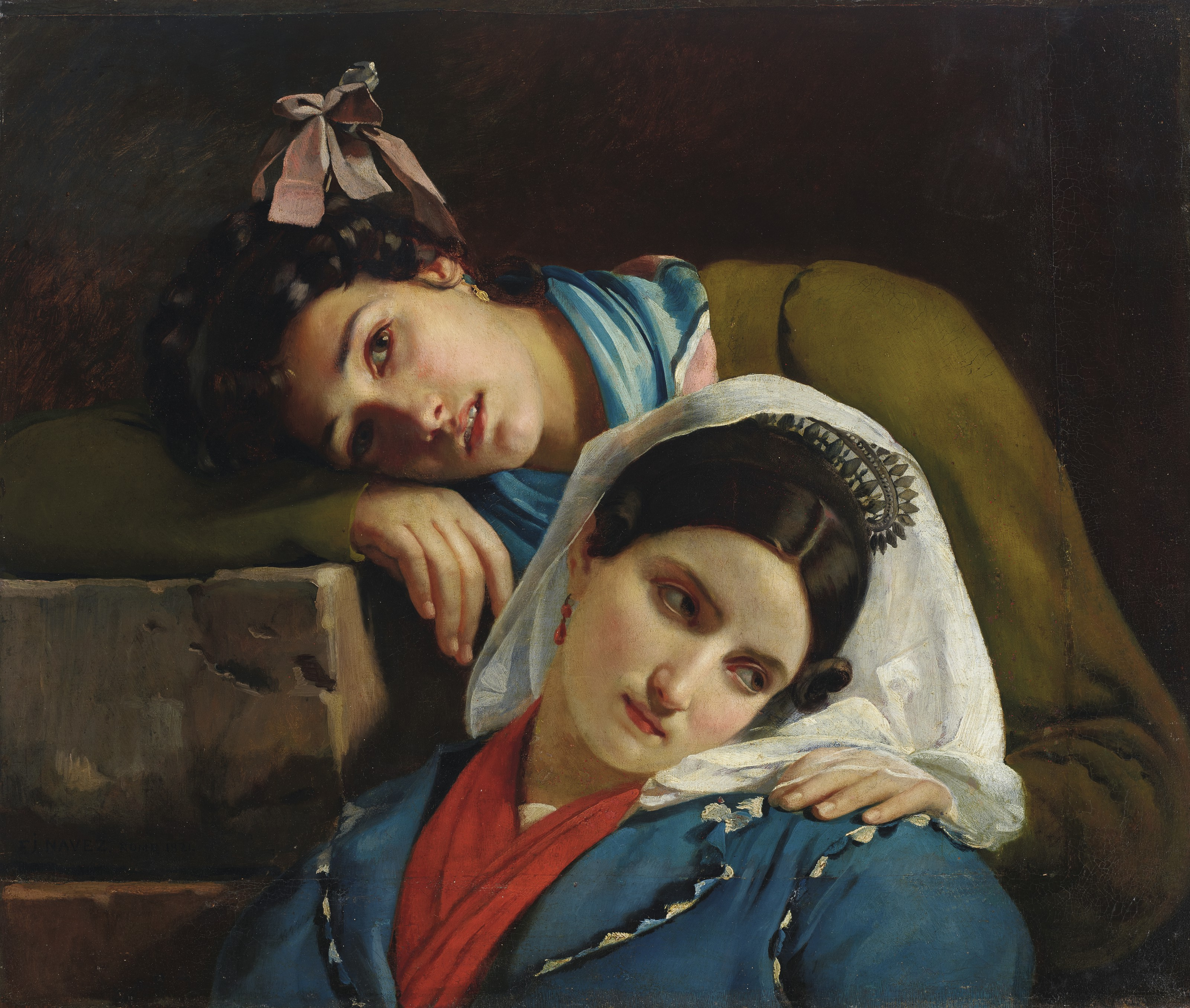
Two Italians (1821)
