= Pierre-François Brice =

French artist (c.1714–1794)

Pierre-François Brice (26 November 1714 (baptised) – 13 May 1794) was a French artist who spent most of his career in what is now Belgium.

== Life ==
Brice was born at Saint-Venant, France. Around 1735, he established himself in Brussels, then capital of the Austrian Netherlands, to devote himself to painting. He was received into the city's Corporation of Painters as a master during 1743–1744. He became painter-decorator to the court of Prince Charles Alexander of Lorraine and painted several interior schemes in his Brussels palace, such as those "paysages chinois" mentioned in the archives. He died in Brussels.

Pierre-François Brice was the father of the painter and engraver Antoine Brice (1752–1817) and the grandfather of Ignace Brice (1795–1866), the "David bruxellois".
