= Ignace Brice =

Belgian painter (1795–1866)

- Born: 2 April 1795; Brussels (Austrian Netherlands)
- Died: 10 August 1866 (aged 71); Saint-Josse-ten-Noode (Belgium)
- Resting place: Laeken Cemetery; Section P.6
- Education: Académie Royale des Beaux-Arts
- Known for: Painting
- Notable work: The Poultryman (Rijksmuseum)
- Style: Genre painting, portrait painting, religious art
- Movement: Neoclassicism
- Spouse: Hortense van Dievoet

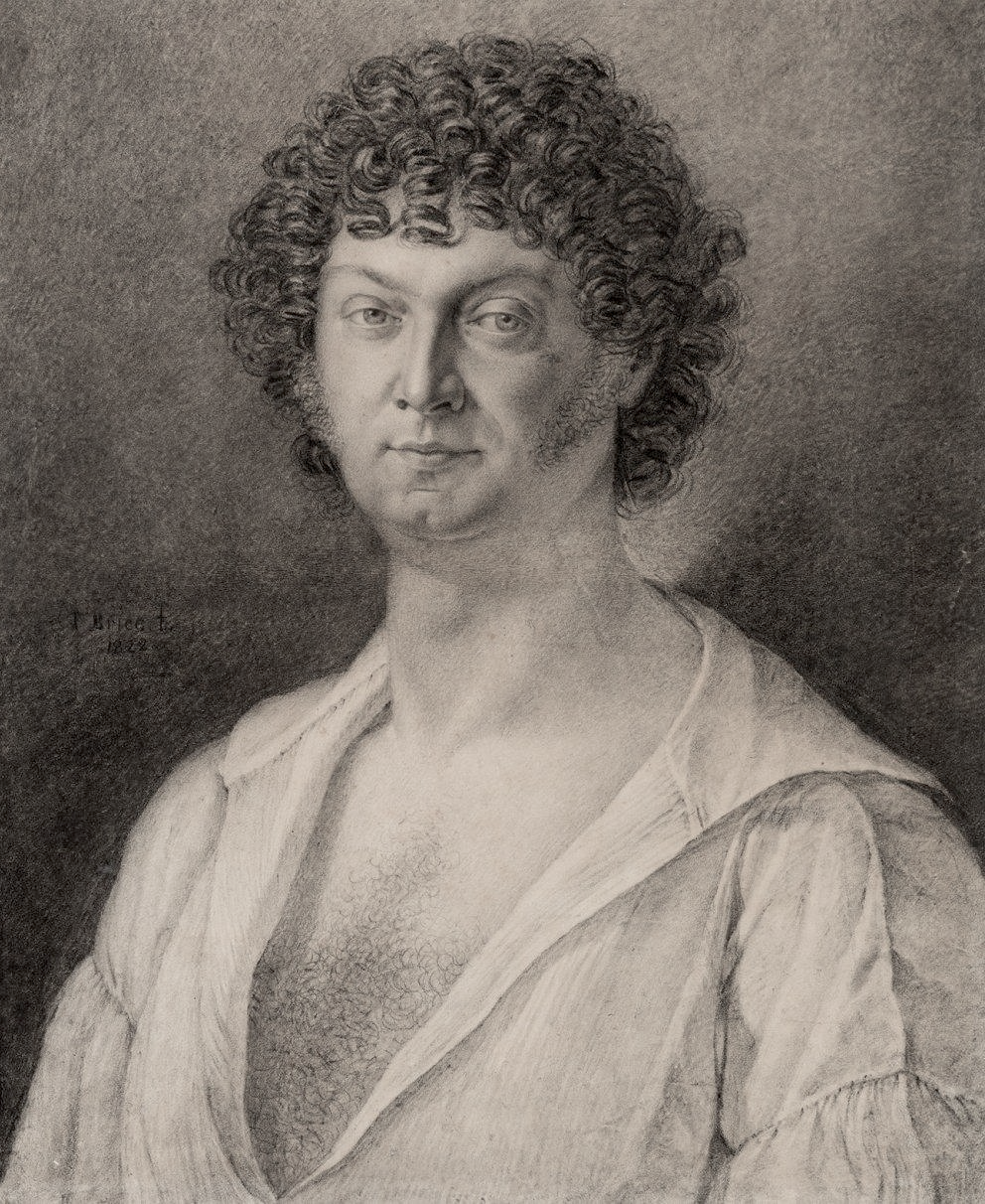
IGNACE BRICE (Belgium, 1795-1866). "Self-portrait," 1822. Charcoal on paper.

Ignace Brice (2 April 1795–10 August 1866) was a neoclassical painter of genre, portraits and religious scenes from Brussels.

== Career ==
Ignace Brice at first studied under his father, Antoine Brice, and at the Académie Royale des Beaux-Arts, where he was strongly influenced by Jacques-Louis David, then in exile in Brussels – Ignace became known as "le David bruxellois". He followed his father as a professor at the Academy, and exhibited in Brussels in 1815, 1824, 1827, 1830 and 1833. He also exhibited in Ghent, Antwerp and Amsterdam, and was one of the founders of the Société des Beaux-Arts de Bruxelles.

He was a genre painter and portraitist, and had a great talent for drawing. His style was sober and classical and, besides David's influence, he reminds the viewer of the Port-Royal painters of the 17th century such as Philippe de Champaigne.

== Family, marriage and issue ==
His father Antoine and his paternal grandfather Pierre-François were both painters. Pierre-François was born in the French village of Saint-Venant, but left to settle in Brussels and become a painter at the court of Prince Charles-Alexandre of Lorraine.

In Brussels on 25 August 1825, Ignace married Hortense van Dievoet (1804–1854), great-grandniece of the Brussels sculptor Peter van Dievoet and of Philippe van Dievoet, known as Vandive, goldsmith to Louis XIV of France.

== Gallery ==
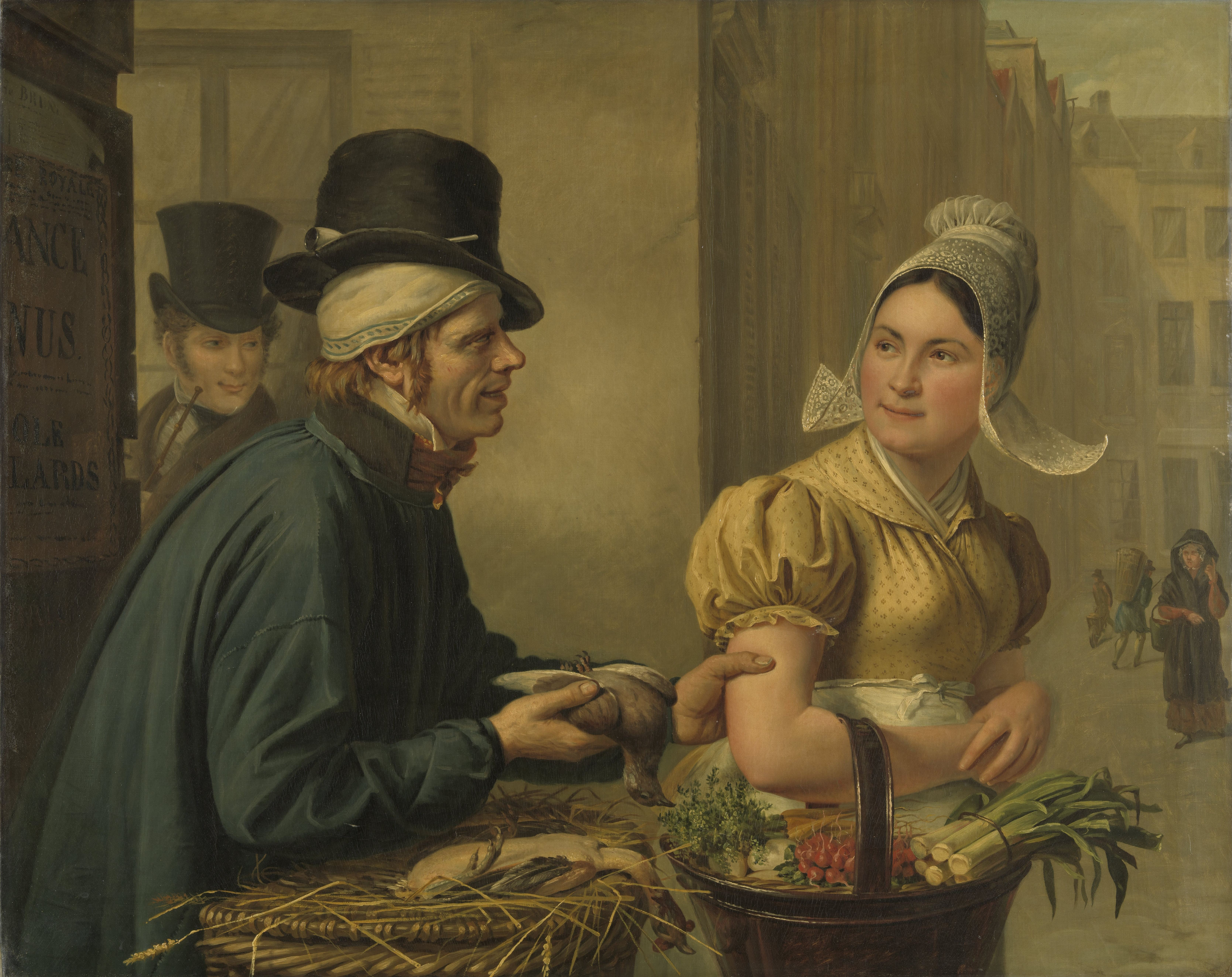
The Poultryman, 1827, now in the Rijksmuseum.

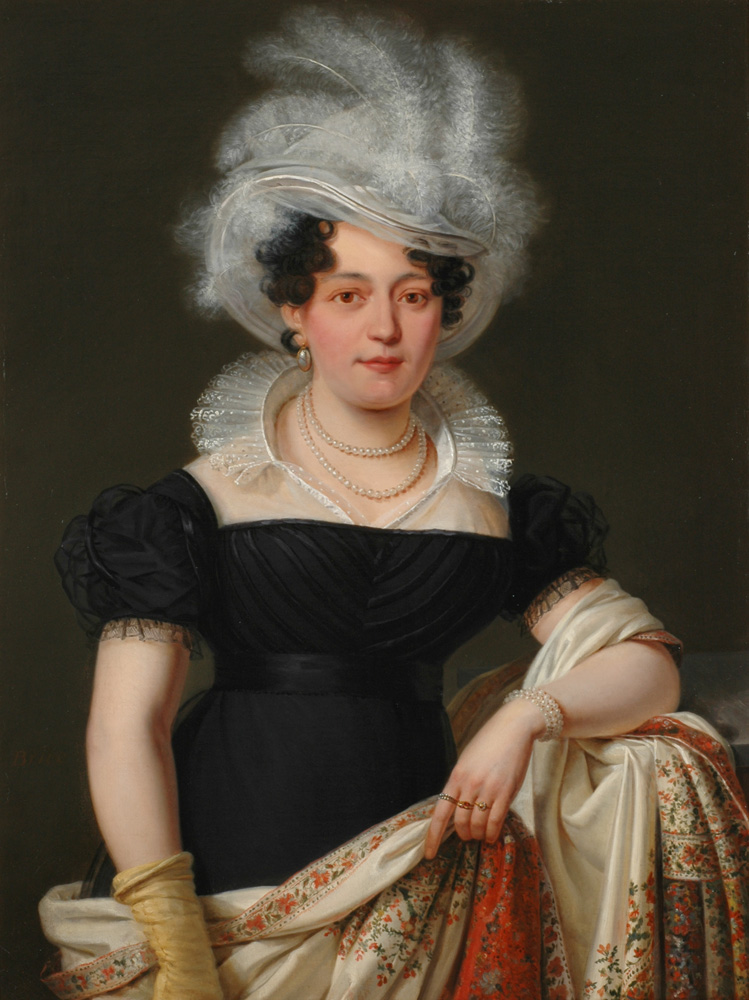
Portrait of a woman with a feather hat, signed "Brice".

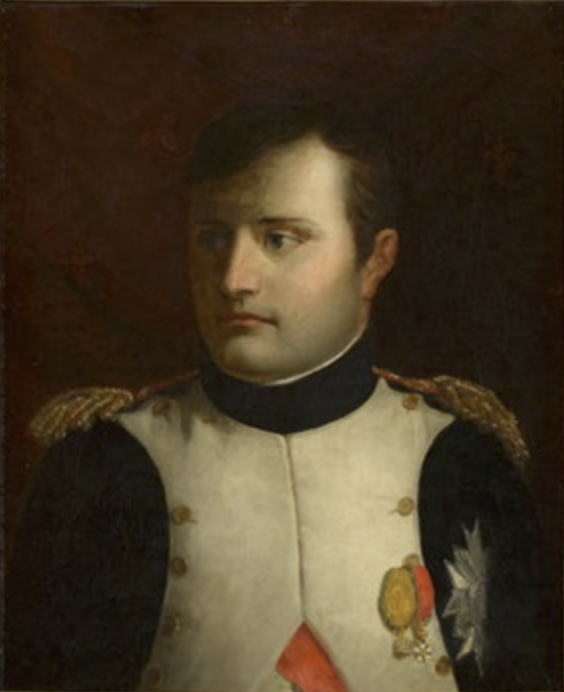
Portrait of Napoleon Bonaparte

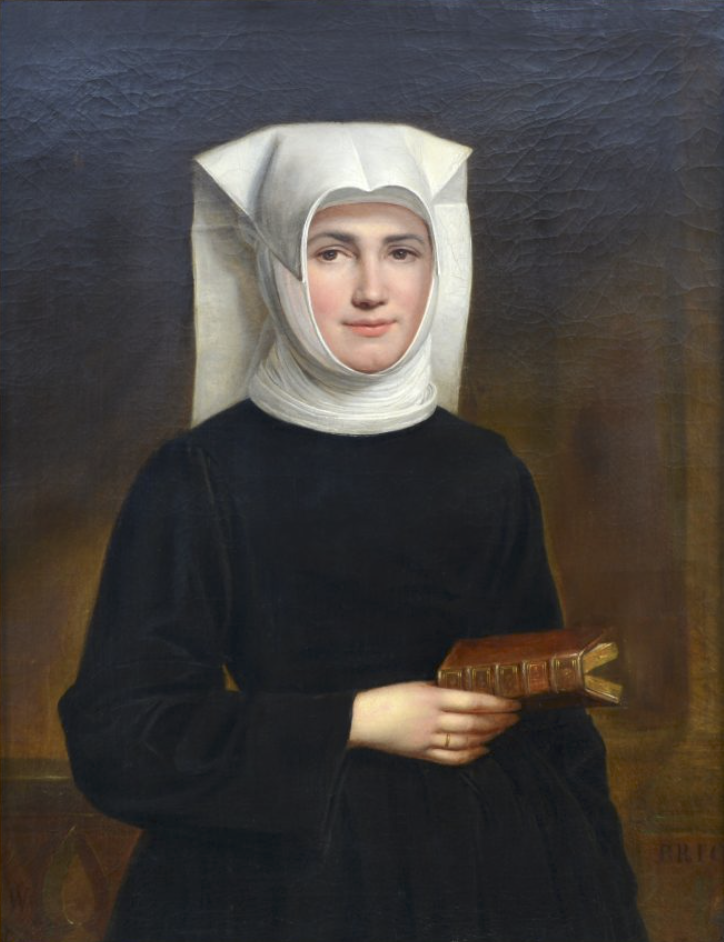
Portrait of a nun holding a book

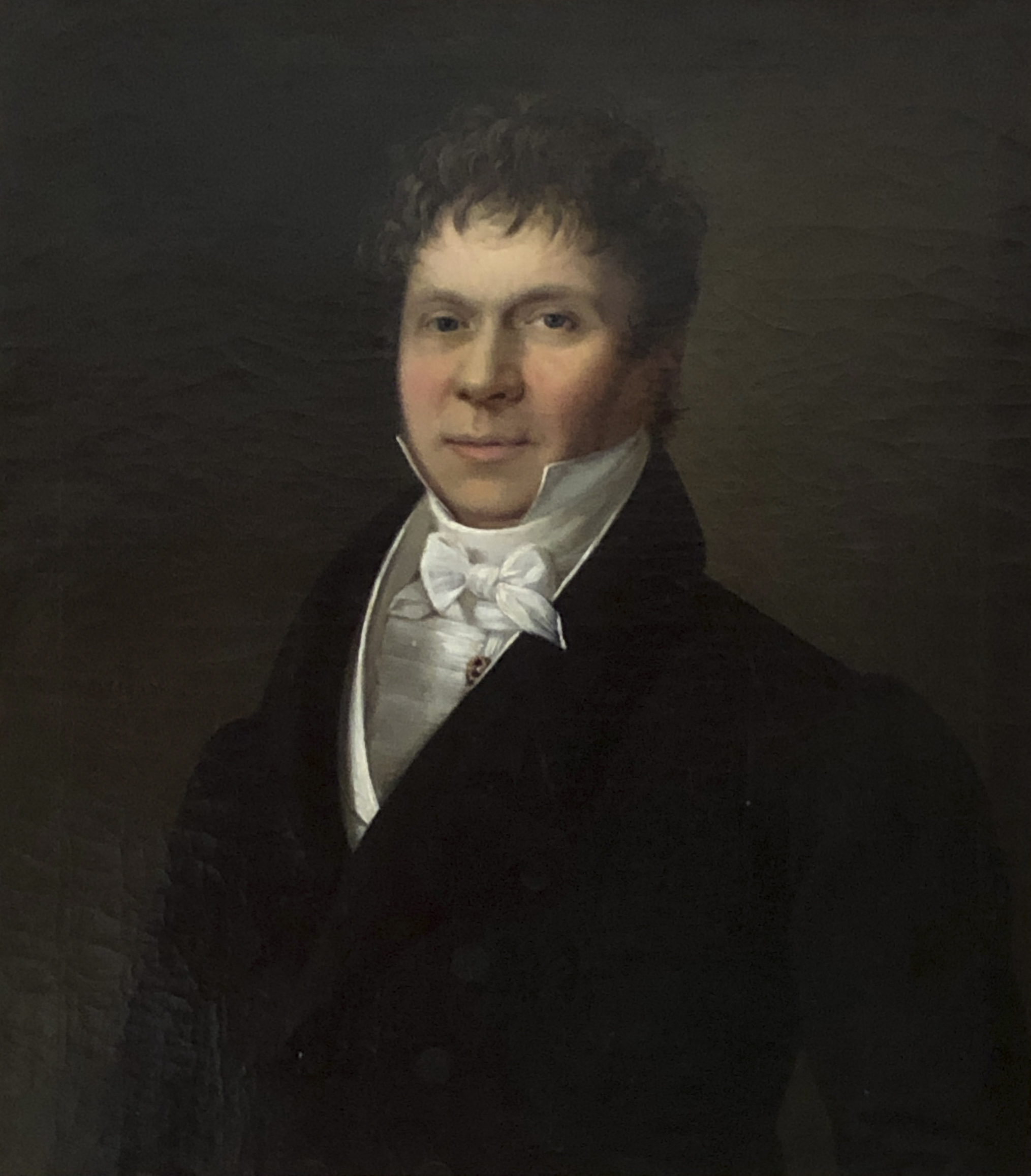
Portrait of Jean-Louis van Dievoet (1777-1854), secretary of the Belgian Supreme Court (1777-1854), oil painting by Ignace Brice, 61 x 70 cm, influenced by Jacques-Louis David.

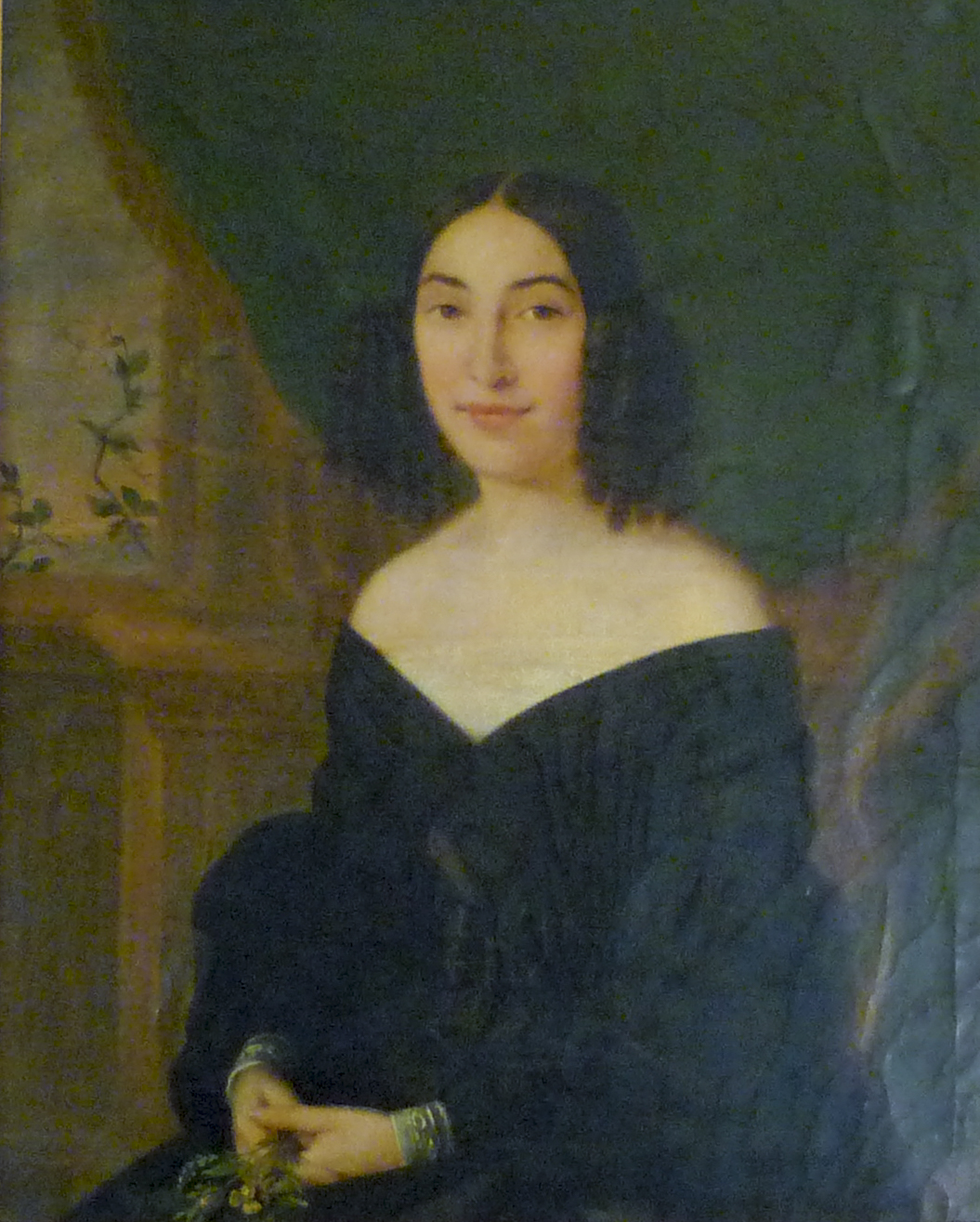
Hortense Poelaert (1815-1900), sister of the architect Joseph Poelaert and wife of Eugène van Dievoet (1804-1858), oil painting by Ignace Brice, 1840. (71 cm x 85 cm)

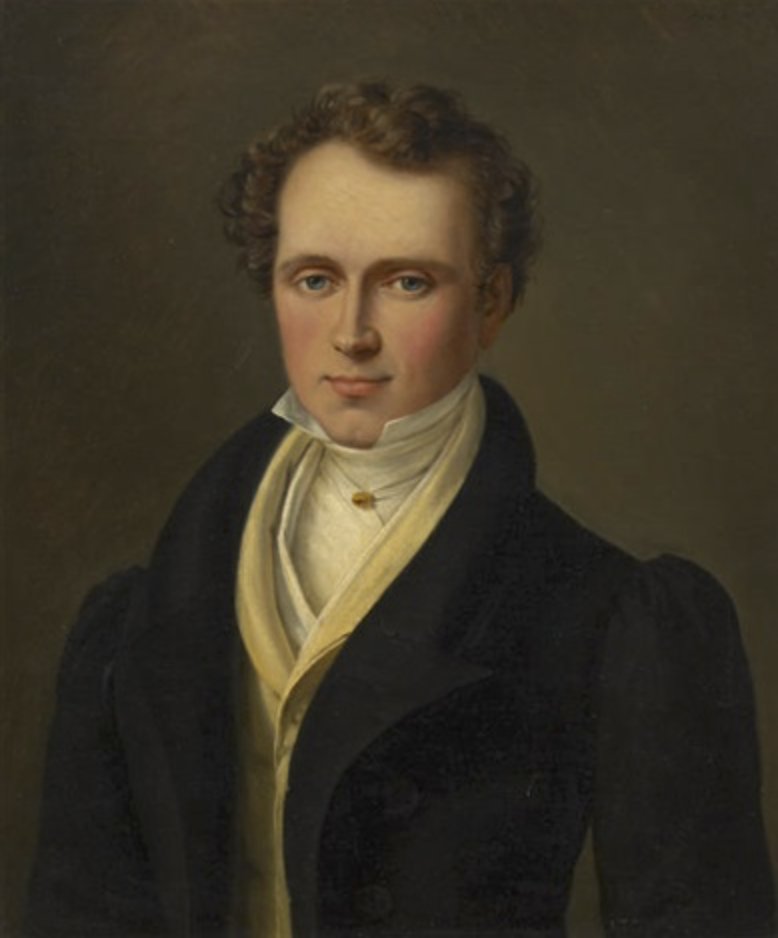
"Portrait of Alphonse"

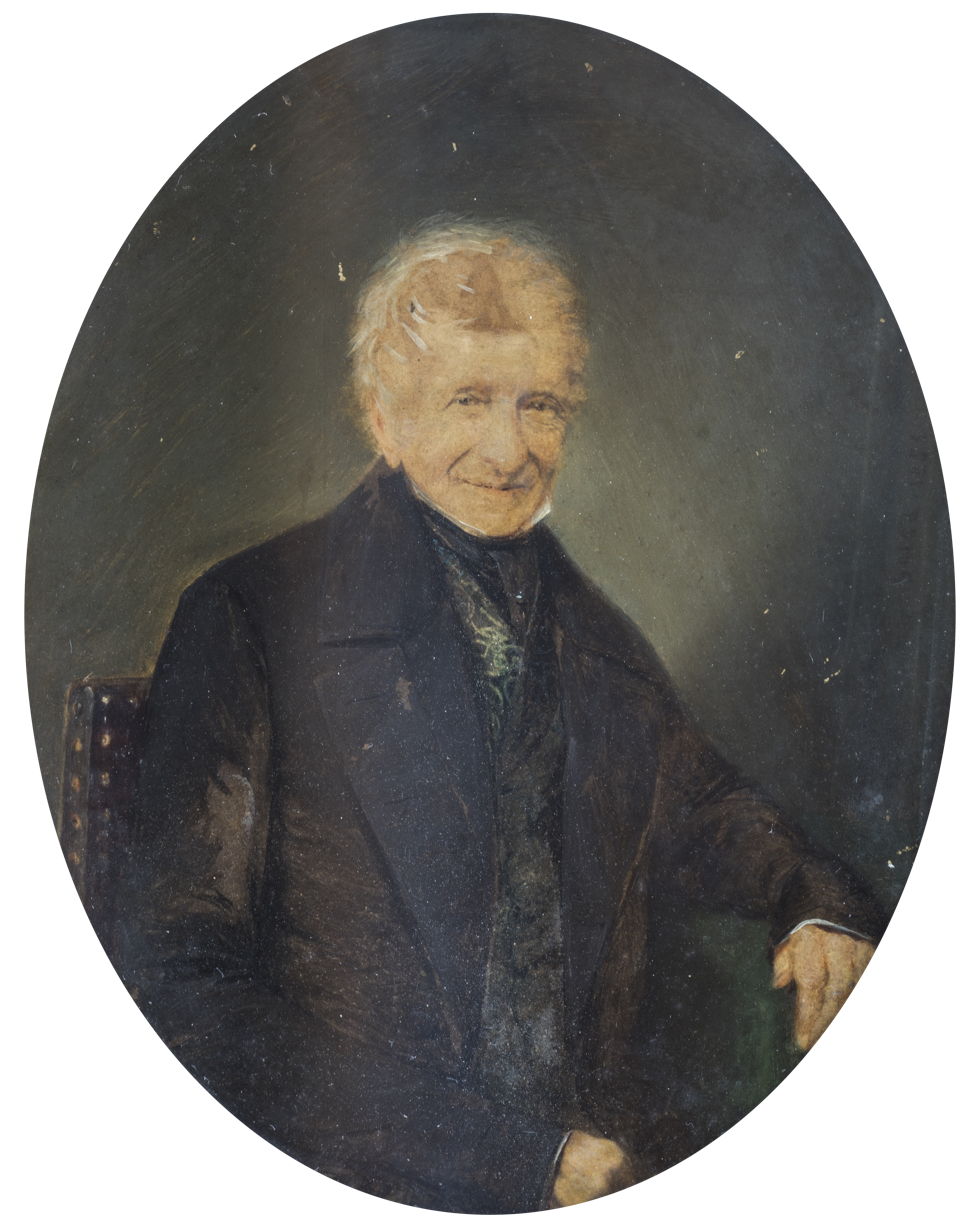
Portrait of his father-in-law Jean-Baptiste van Dievoet (1775-1862) signed "Brice 1856"

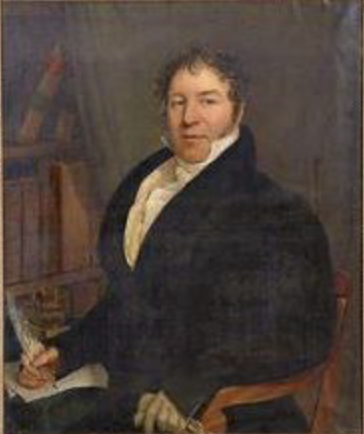
"Writer at his desk"

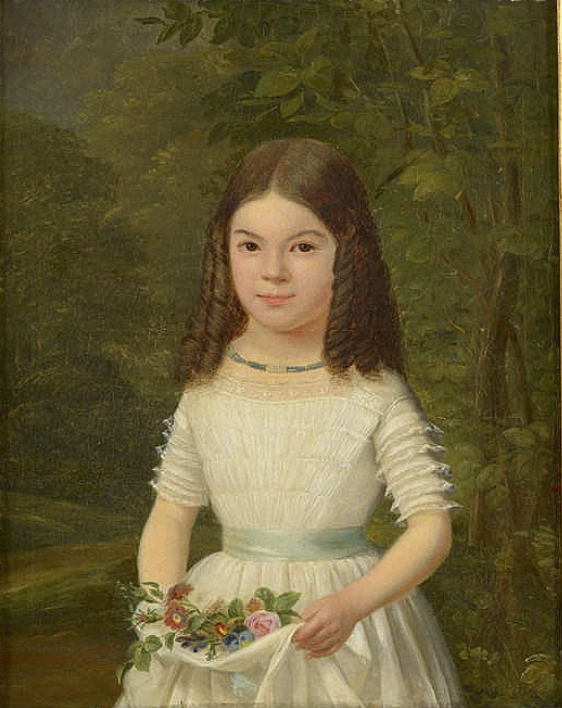
"Little girl holding flowers"

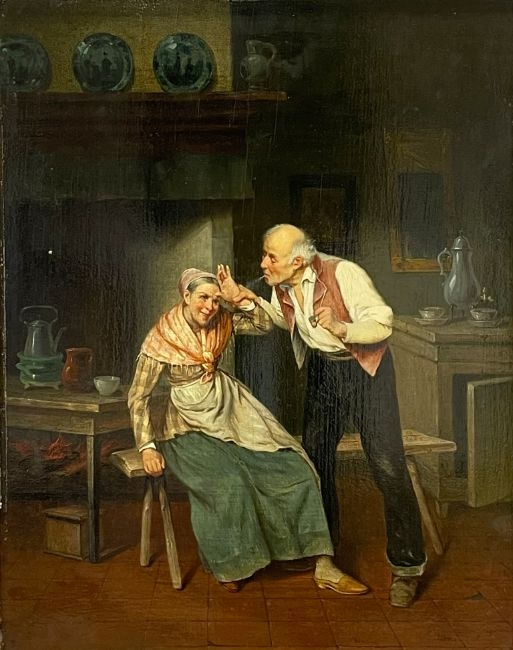
"Humorous interior scene with an elderly couple"

== Works ==
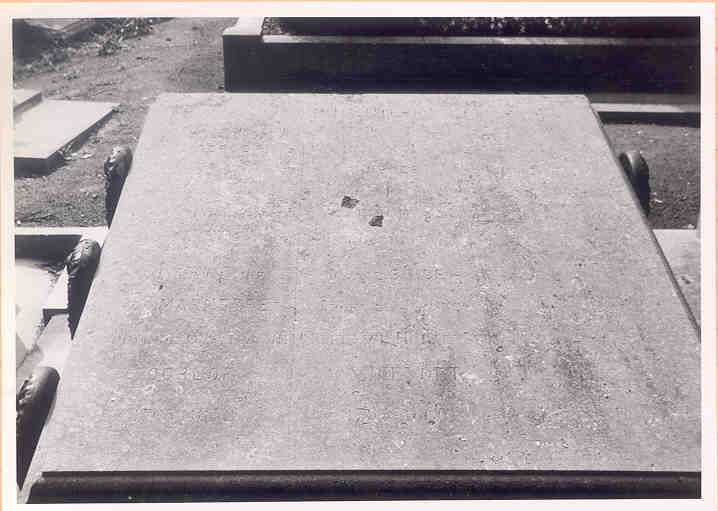
Tomb of Ignace Brice (1795–1866), Laeken cemetery, section P.6.

- Lithographic portrait of Thérèse Langhendries, superior of the hôpital Saint-Jean de Bruxelles
- The young lady with her daughter in a garden, national Salon of 1842
- Portrait of Louis-Xavier Gomand (1803–1875)
- Portrait of Henri Joseph Meeûs, master-brewer, husband of Marie Madeleine van der Borcht.
- The Magician, oil on canvas, 120 x 108 cm.
- Portrait of Adrien Joseph Eugène Oorlof.
- Portrait of Hortense Poelaert (1815–1900), wife of Eugène van Dievoet (1804–1858), 1840, oil on canvas, 71 x 85 cm.
- Portrait of Jean-Louis van Dievoet (1777–1854), secretary to the Parquet de la Cour de Cassation (1777–1854), 61 x 70 cm, influenced by Jacques-Louis David.]
- The Poultryman (1827), painting by Ignace Brice, exhibited at the Brussels salon in 1827, now at the Rijksmuseum in Amsterdam
- The Holy Family surrounded by angels, oils, 1818. (now at the Centre Public d'aide sociale, Brussels).

== Bibliography ==
- (in French) Paul De Zuttere, "Les Brice, peintres à Bruxelles aux XVIIIe et XIXe siècles", in L'Intermédiaire des Généalogistes, Bruxelles, n° 190, 1977, pp. 258–265.
- (in French) Paul De Zuttere, "Contribution à l'œuvre des peintres Antoine et Ignace Brice", in L'Intermédiaire des Généalogistes, Bruxelles, n° 345, 2003, p. 113–121.
- (in French) Messager des sciences historiques, Société royale des beaux-arts et de littérature de Gand, Société royale d'agriculture et de botanique de Gand. Published by P.F. de Goesin-Verhaeghe, 1879: page 469, "Ignace Brice (fils de maître)".

== See also ==
- List of Belgian painters
- Art of Belgium
