= Adèle Kindt =

Belgian painter

Marie-Adélaïde Kindt
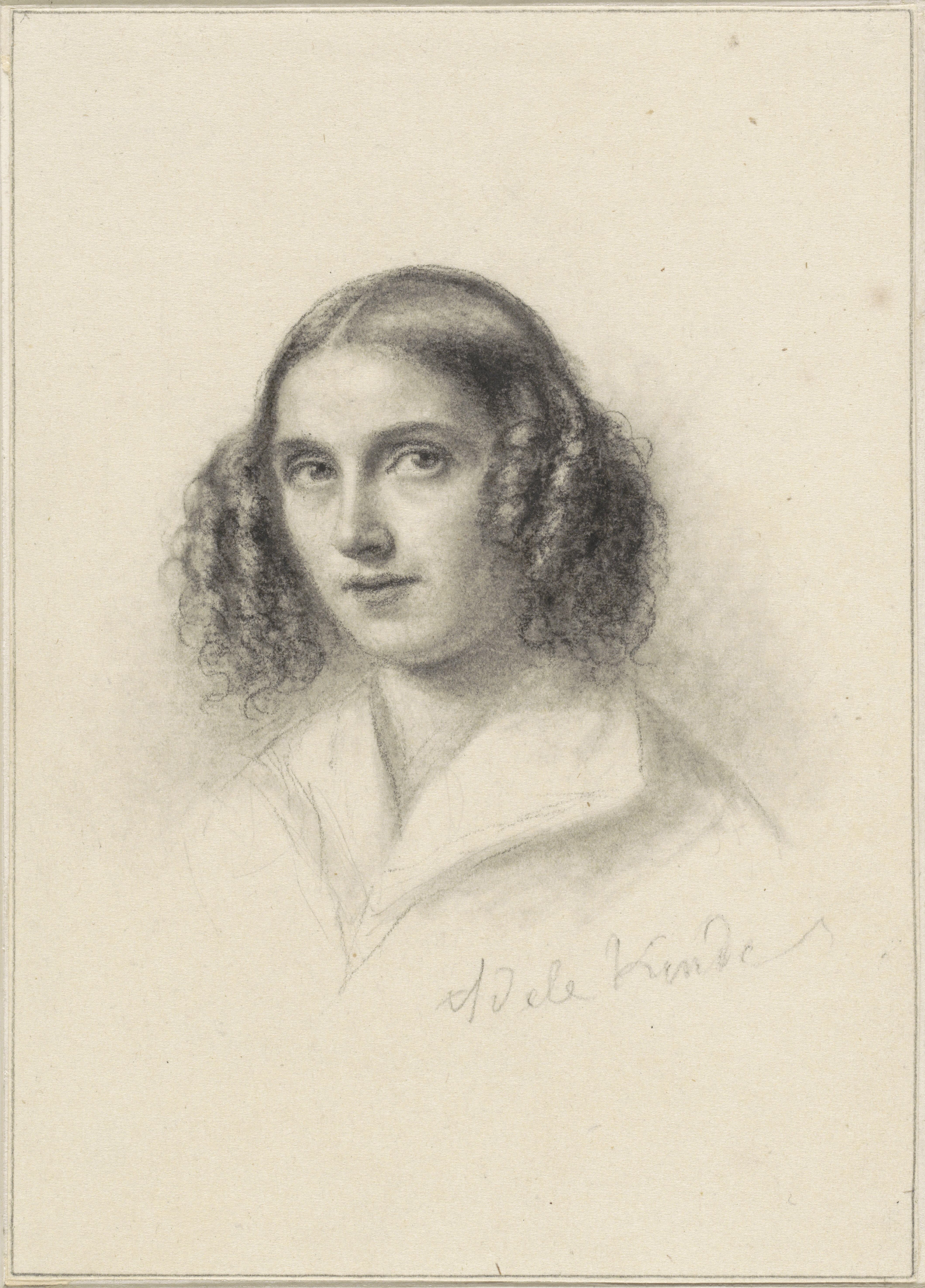
- Self-portrait (c.1820)
- Born: 16 December 1804; Brussels, France (now in Belgium)
- Died: 8 May 1893 (aged 88); Brussels, Belgium
- Known for: Painting
- Movement: Romanticism

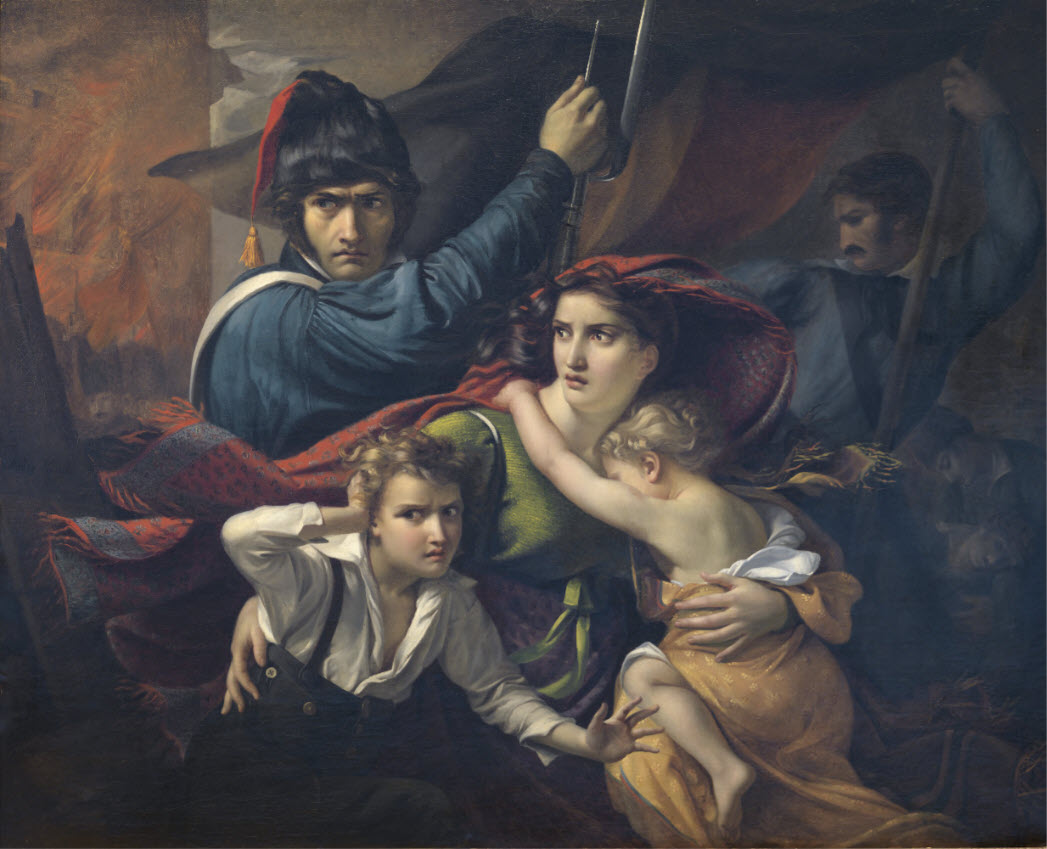
Part of Kindt's Épisode des journées de septembre 1830.

Adèle Kindt (16 December 1804 – 8 May 1893) was a Belgian painter; known primarily for portraits and genre scenes.

== Biography ==
Born in Brussels into a family that produced many female artists, Marie-Adélaïde Kindt was trained in drawing by engraver Antoine Cardon. She studied painting under Sophie Rude and François-Joseph Navez and was encouraged by Jacques-Louis David.

Although trained as a neoclassicist, Kindt produced work informed by Romanticism. Her early works included many historical scenes. Her Épisode des journées de septembre 1830, portraying a scene from the Belgian Revolution of 1830, is considered her masterpiece and is on display in the Brussels city museum on the Grand-Place.

After the 1840s, Kindt painted much less ambitious works, largely portraiture and genre scenes. Although she adapted her style to suit the changing tastes of the public, she never recaptured the success of her early career. She died in Brussels. Her date of death is usually said to have been in 1884, but this has also been described as a "stubborn error" that should be corrected to 8 May 1893. Her death was reported in the newspaper Le Patriote on 12 May 1893, in coverage of registrations of births, deaths and marriages in the city of Brussels.

Her younger sisters Clara and Laurence were landscape painters, as was her sister-in-law Isabelle Kindt-Van Assche.

== Gallery ==
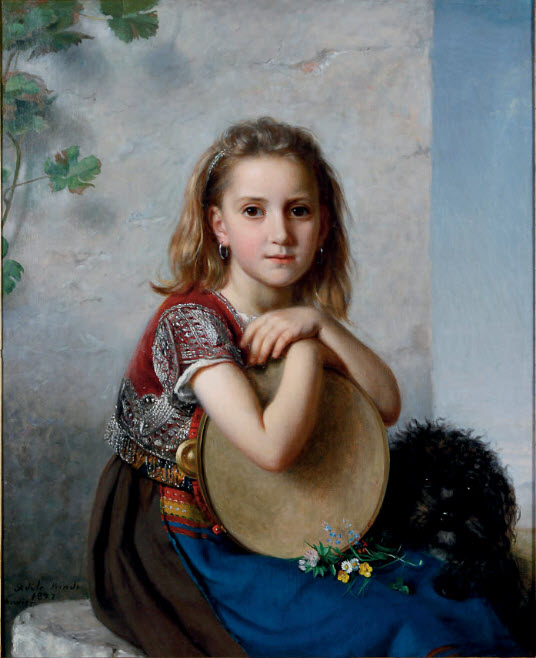
A portrait of a young girl and her dog, 1877

The Fortune Teller, 1828

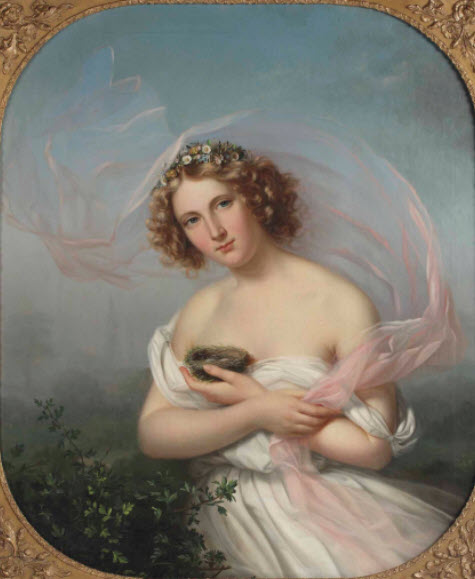
A young girl in a white dress with a pink veil and flowers in her hair, holding a bird's nest with two eggs, 1853

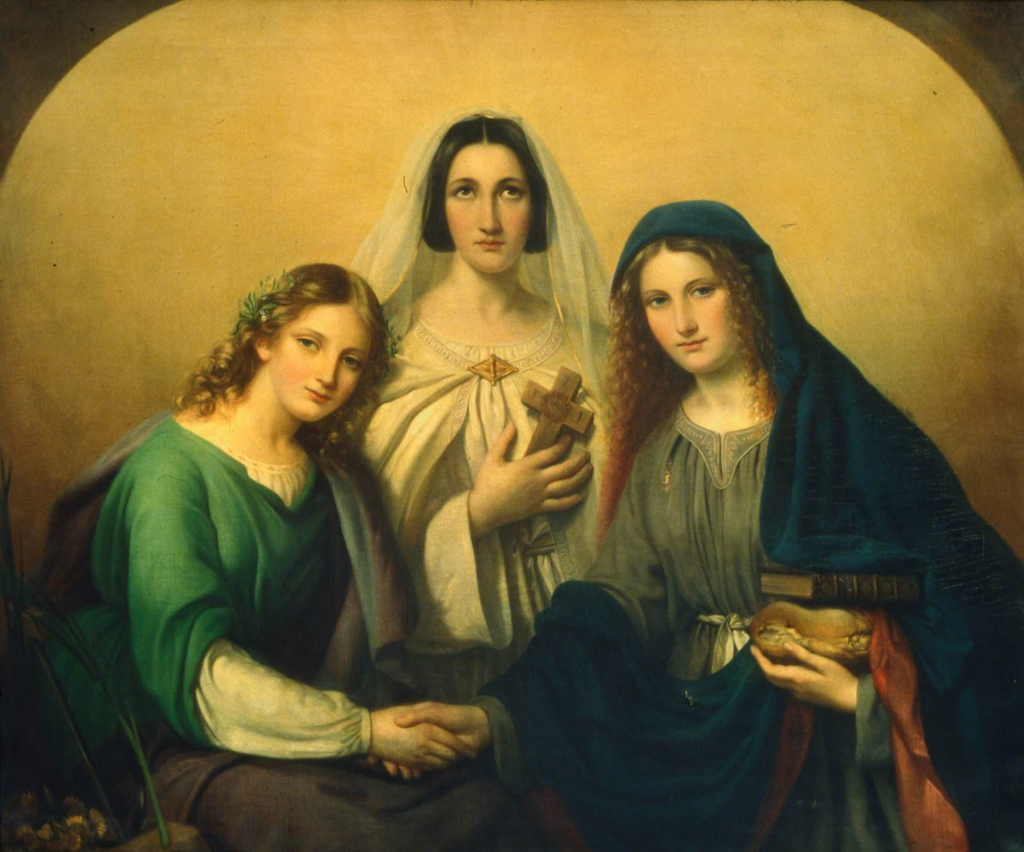
Faith, Hope and Charity, 1840

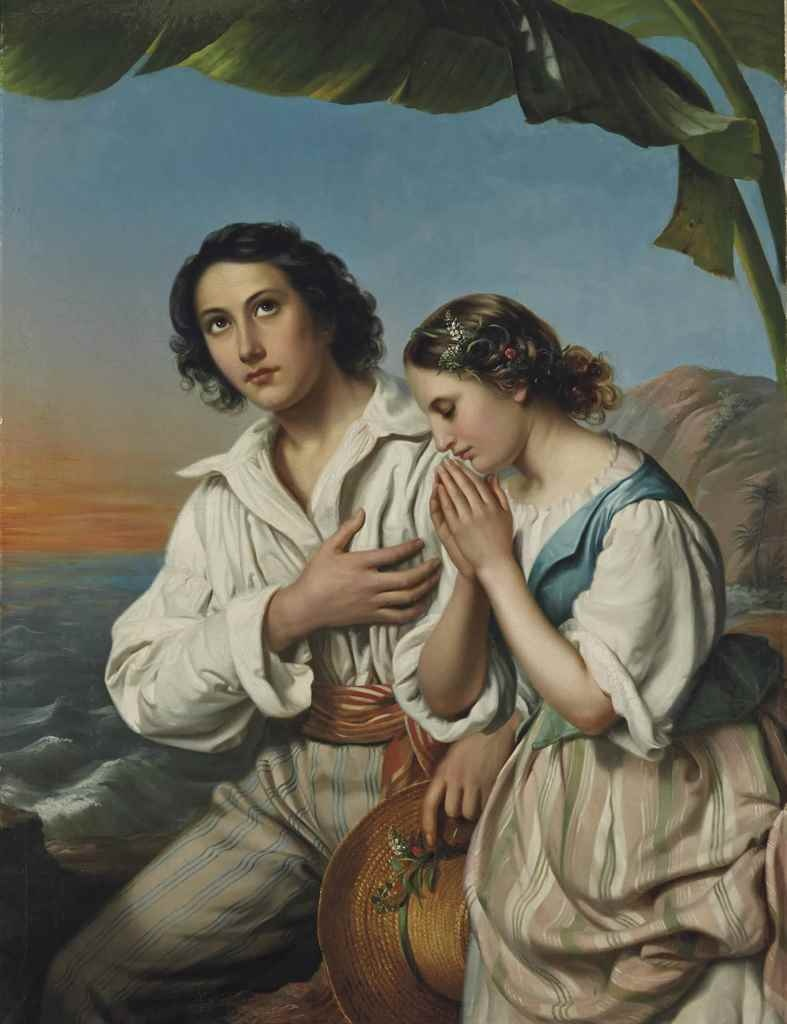
Paul and Virginie, 1840
