= Antoine Cardon =

Belgian painter, portraitist and engraver

Antoine-Alexandre-Joseph Cardon (1739–1822), also known as Cardon the elder to distinguish him from his son Anthony Cardon, was a painter, portraitist and engraver.

== Life ==
Cardon was born in Brussels, 1739. He lived for a long time on rue de Persil (near place Saint-Michel, now known as Place des Martyrs) in the city, which also passed through French and Dutch hands during his lifetime, and shone in the arts under the Austrian, French and Dutch regimes.

He was a student of Hyacinthe de La Peyne, painter to empress Maria Theresa, the sovereign of the Austrian Netherlands, and once followed his teacher to Vienna. Thanks to the protection of Johann Karl Philipp von Cobenzl, Maria-Theresa's minister-plenipotentiary in Brussels, Cardon became a pensionary of the government and was thus able to stay for a time in Rome and Naples.

Recalled to Brussels by Cobenzl, he became a professor at the Royal Academy of Fine Arts and made his artistic career in the city - his pupils included Adèle Kindt. It was there in 1810 that he and Antoine Brice founded an association of professional and amateur artists. In 1822 Cardon was named a member of the Royal Institute of the Netherlands by William II of the Netherlands.

He was a highly enthusiastic member of Freemasonry, then having great success in the nobility of the Austrian Netherlands - his name is among the first initiates of the "loge de l'Union" (third lodge in Brussels, n° 9, inscribed on the tables of 1783 and 1786), and he engraved several Masonic diplomas and emblems.

Cardon died in Brussels.

== Works ==
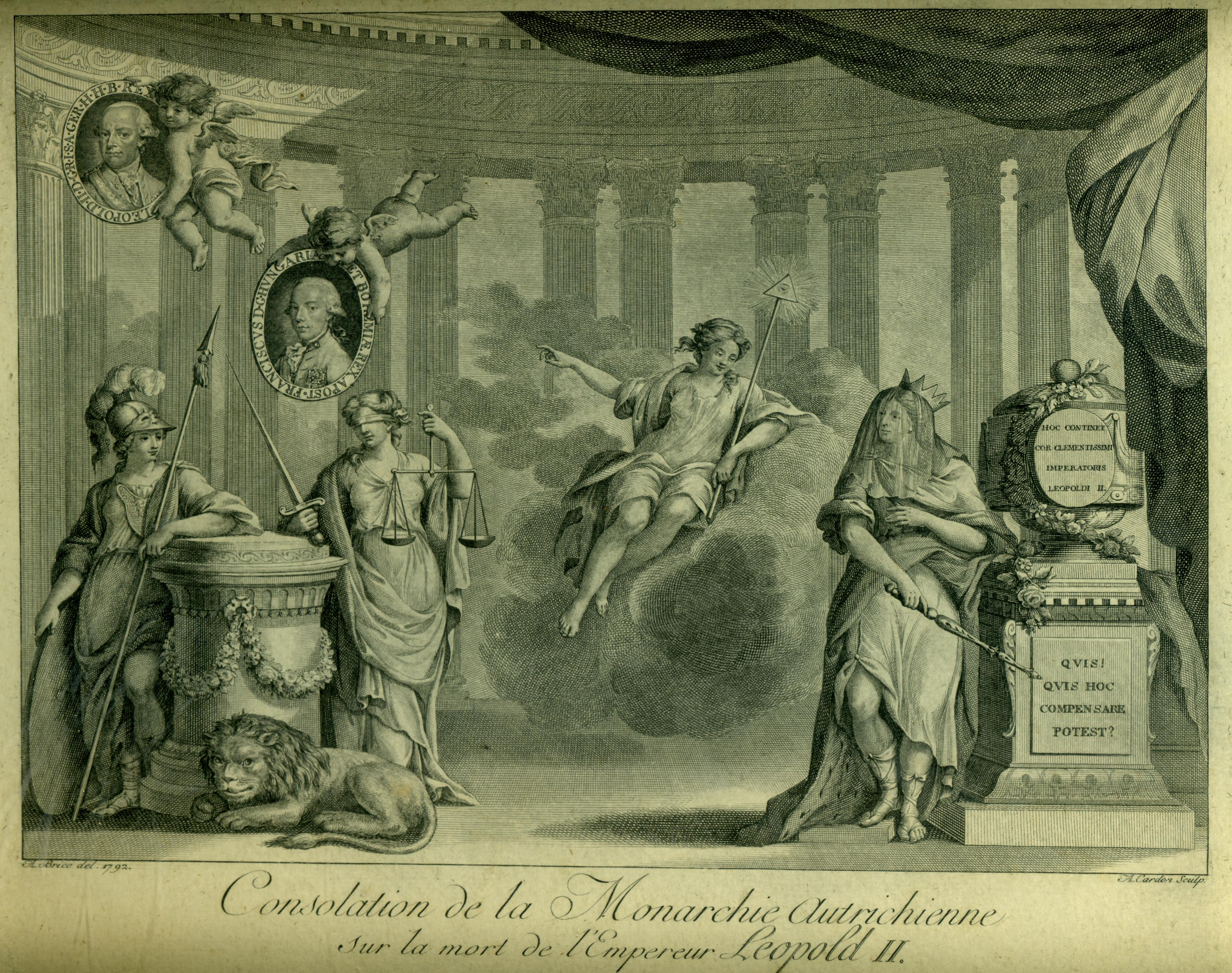
Drawing by Antoine Brice engraved by Cardon, Consolation of the Austrian Monarchy on the death of emperor Leopold II

His secular works include:

- engraving of the painting by Antoine Brice, Consolation of the Austrian Monarchy on the death of emperor Leopold I.
- engravings for d'Hancarville's book on the antiquities collected in Naples by William Hamilton.
- engravings of images after Antoine Watteau.
- portrait of Joseph II engraved after Willem Jacob Herreyns.
- portrait of the prince de Ligne.
- Masonic Diploma of Lodge La Constante Fidelite, Mechelen, Belgium (then Austrian Netherlands)
- engraved portrait of the musician Ignace Vitzthumb.

== Family ==
Antoine Cardon was the father of Philippe Cardon (?–1817) and of the engraver Anthony Cardon the Younger (1772–1813) who set up as an engraver in England in 1790 and died in London.
