= Starry Night (Munch) =

Painting by Edvard Munch

- Stjernenatt (Norwegian)
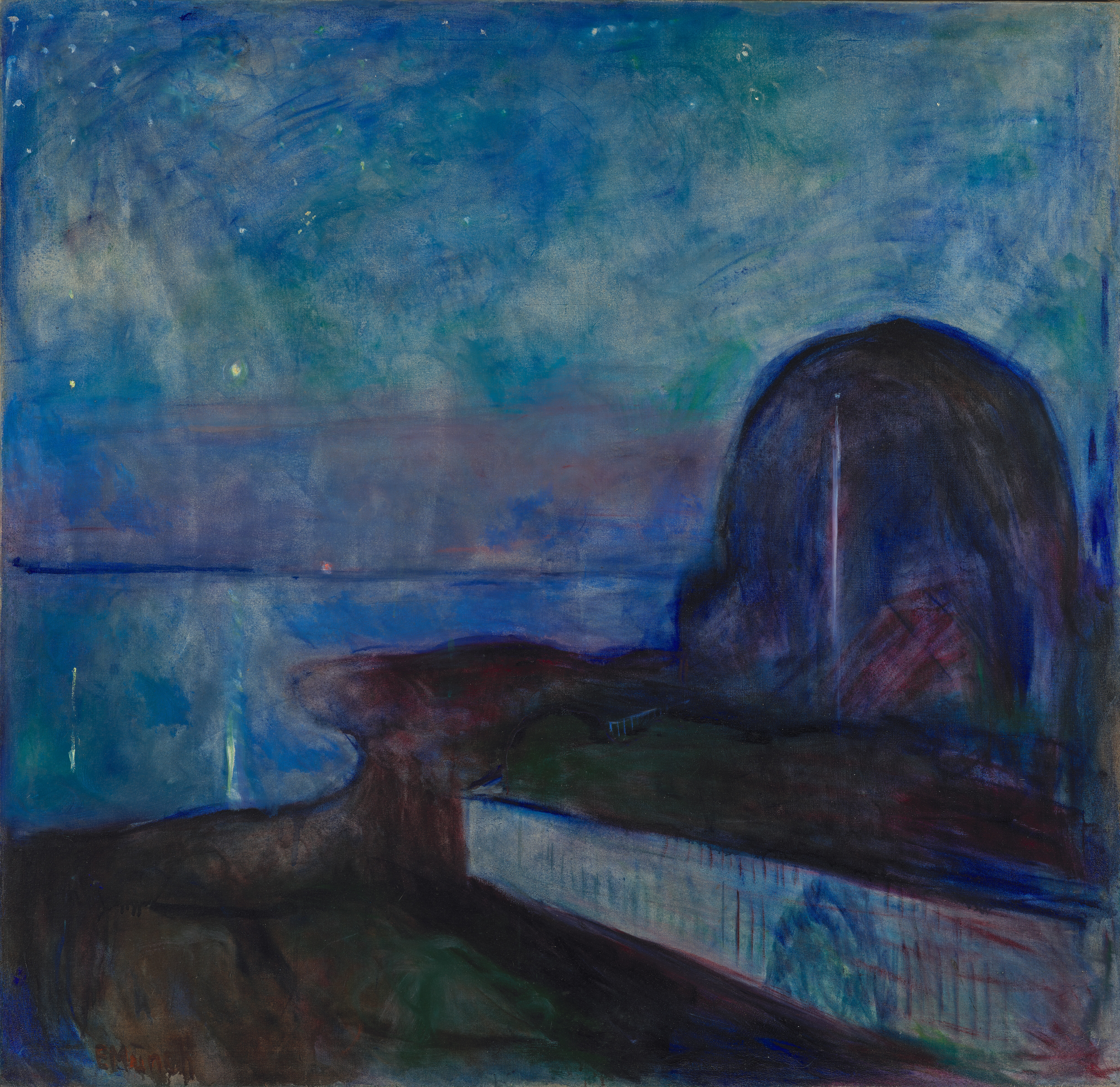
- Artist: Edvard Munch
- Year: 1893
- Medium: Oil on canvas
- Dimensions: 135.6 cm × 140.0 cm (53.4 in × 55.1 in)
- Location: The J. Paul Getty Museum; Los Angeles

Starry Night (Norwegian: Stjernenatt) is an oil-on-canvas painting by the Norwegian artist Edvard Munch, from 1893. This night landscape represents the coastline at Åsgårdstrand, a small beach resort south of Oslo in Norway, where Edvard Munch had spent his summers since the late 1880s. In this painting Munch shows the view from the hotel window where he fell in love for the first time.

== See also ==
- List of paintings by Edvard Munch
- The Starry Night, Vincent van Gogh painting
