= Henry Matthew Talintyre =

British comic strip artist (1893–1962)

Henry Matthew Talintyre (1893–1962) was a British comic strip artist, best known for drawing the elephant character Uncle Oojah for Flo Lancaster's comic series that later became The Wonderful Adventures of Jerry, Don and Snooker.

== Biography ==
Talintyre was born in Gateshead, Durham in 1893.

He served in World War I, then moved to London in the 1920s. He later drew nursery comics for DC Thomson and lived in Dundee, where he lodged in a boarding house with the father of cartoonist Dave Gibbons. Gibbons would later describe him as "something of a bohemian type... very unlike a customs officer." His son, Douglas, recalled that Talintyre and his fellow artists were frustrated by DC Thompson's management style, even smashing a clocking-in machine the company introduced.

Talintyre took over the Oojah comic series after the death of its previous illustrator, Thomas Maybank. The strip ran in Playhour, Pictures and Jack and Jill. This version of the comic renamed The Wonderful Adventures of Jerry, Don and Snooker, which ran in Jack and Jill between 1954 and 1958.

Talintyre also contributed to the early issues of TV Comic, where he drew characters named "Jack and Jill" (unrelated to the characters in the comic of that name).

Talintyre married Gladys Gould, whom he met while living in London. He was involved in several music hall shows. He died in the Chichester area of Britain in 1962, aged 69.
