= Eugène Gabritschevsky =

Russian painter

Eugène (or Eugen) Gabritschevsky (December 1893 – April 5, 1979) was a Russian biologist and artist. He was born into a comfortable family of scientists from Imperial Russia. His father was a bacteriologist, and worked with Louis Pasteur in France and with Robert Koch in Germany.

Gabritschevsky studied biology at the University of Moscow from 1913, specialising in problems related to heredity. He finished his studies successfully and went into research. In 1925, he was invited to the Columbia University in the United States, where he continued his work for two years, and in 1927, he settled in Paris, where he continued his research at the Pasteur Institute. By the age of thirty-three, he was well known in his field for his knowledge on the laws of mutation in the lives of insects.

He was committed to Haar-Eflingen psychiatric hospital in 1931 and diagnosed with schizophrenia. He spent the remainder of his life in the hospital.

In the ensuing thirty years, Gabritschevsky created an extraordinary body of art: thousands of paintings and drawings. His first works look quite academic and are inspired by corals or human figures. As his condition worsened, however, his subjects gradually changed. He started painting ghost-looking silhouettes, large-headed monsters with huge eyes, and then later small beings that look like mutants.

His artistic output continues to have appeal, however, and his paintings have appeared on record sleeves of the Scottish folk band Appendix Out and the American band Mob Trio. In addition, his scientific papers are still held in high esteem, and are often cited.
