= Military history of France =

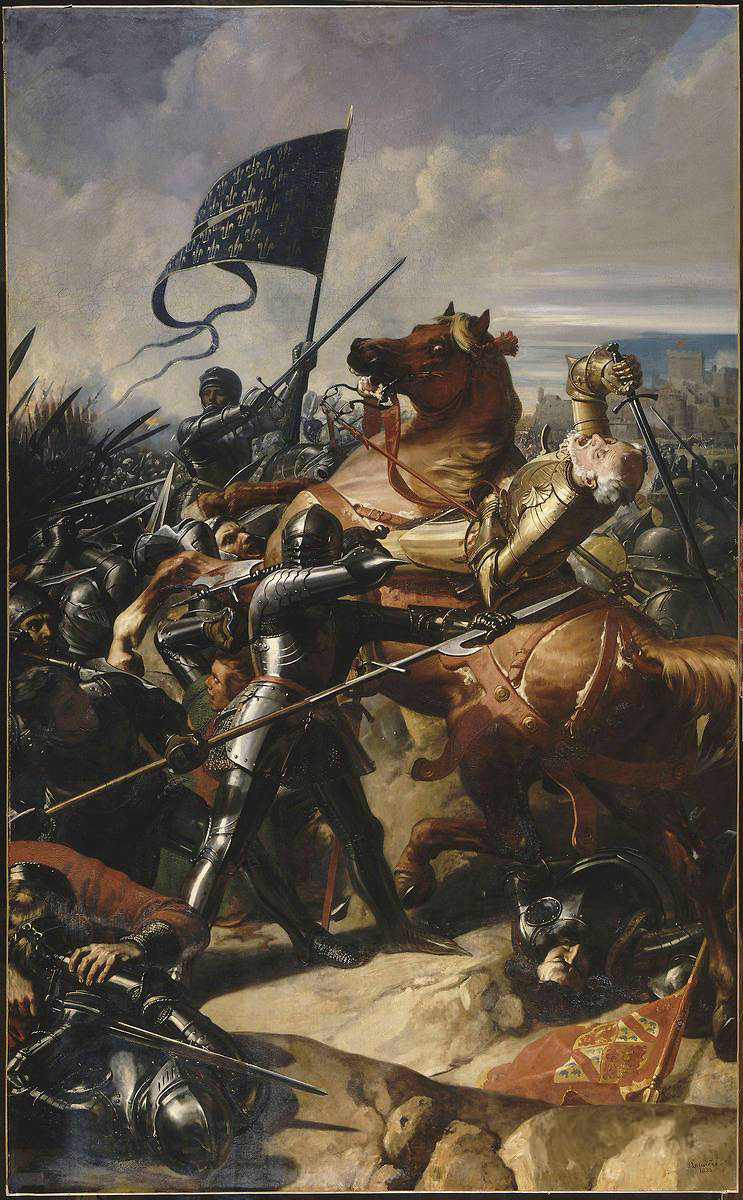
In July 1453, a French army defeated its English opponents at the Battle of Castillon, the last major engagement of the Hundred Years War. The victory at Castillon showcased the power of artillery against charging masses of infantry and allowed the French to capture Bordeaux a few months later. The English subsequently lost their major remaining possessions on the European continent. The 1839 painting The Battle of Castillon is by Charles-Philippe Larivière

The military history of France encompasses an immense panorama of conflicts and struggles extending for more than 2,000 years across areas including modern France, Europe, and a variety of regions throughout the world.

According to historian Niall Ferguson, France is the most successful military power in history. It participated in 50 of the 125 major European wars that have been fought since 1495; more than any other European state. The first major recorded wars in the territory of modern-day France itself revolved around the Gallo-Roman conflict that predominated from 60 BC to 50 BC. The Romans eventually emerged victorious through the campaigns of Julius Caesar. After the decline of the Roman Empire, a Germanic tribe known as the Franks took control of Gaul by defeating competing tribes. The "land of Francia", from which France gets its name, had high points of expansion under kings Clovis I and Charlemagne, who established the nucleus of the future French state. In the Middle Ages, rivalries with England prompted major conflicts such as the Norman Conquest and the Hundred Years' War. With an increasingly centralized monarchy, the first standing army since Roman times, and the use of artillery, France expelled the English from its territory and came out of the Middle Ages as the most powerful nation in Europe, only to lose that status to the Holy Roman Empire and Spain following defeat in the Italian Wars. The Wars of Religion crippled France in the late 16th century, but a major victory over Spain in the Thirty Years' War made France the most powerful nation on the continent once more. In parallel, France developed its first colonial empire in Asia, Africa, and in the Americas. Under Louis XIV France achieved military supremacy over its rivals, but escalating conflicts against increasingly powerful enemy coalitions checked French ambitions and left the kingdom bankrupt at the opening of the 18th century.

Resurgent French armies secured victories in dynastic conflicts against the Spanish, Polish, and Austrian crowns. At the same time, France was fending off attacks on its colonies. As the 18th century advanced, global competition with Great Britain led to the Seven Years' War, where France lost its North American holdings. Consolation came in the form of dominance in Europe and the American Revolutionary War, where extensive French aid in the form of money and arms, and the direct participation of its army and navy led to the independence of the United States. Internal political upheaval eventually led to 23 years of nearly continuous conflict in the French Revolutionary Wars and the Napoleonic Wars. France reached the zenith of its power during this period, dominating the European continent in an unprecedented fashion under Napoleon Bonaparte. However, France was ultimately defeated in 1815, and its borders were restored to the same ones it controlled before the Revolution. The rest of the 19th century witnessed the growth of the Second French colonial empire as well as French interventions in Belgium, Spain, and Mexico. Other major wars were fought against Russia in the Crimea, Austria in Italy, and Prussia within France itself.

Following defeat in the Franco-Prussian War, Franco-German rivalry erupted again in the First World War. France and its allies were victorious this time. Social, political, and economic upheaval in the wake of the conflict led to the Second World War, in which France and the Allies were defeated in the Battle of France and almost half of the country was placed under German military occupation for more than four years. The Allies, including the Free French Forces led by a government in exile, eventually emerged victorious over the Axis powers. As a result, France secured an occupation zone in Germany and a permanent seat on the United Nations Security Council. The imperative of avoiding a third Franco-German conflict on the scale of the first two world wars paved the way for European integration starting in the 1950s. France became a nuclear power and, since the late 20th century, has cooperated closely with NATO, the United States and European partners.

== Dominant themes ==
Animated map of French territory in continental Europe over time. After centuries of warfare and diplomacy, France has the largest territory of any nation in Western Europe.

Historian Niall Ferguson argues that France is the most belligerent military power in history. It participated in 50 of the 125 major European wars fought since 1495; more than any other European state. It is followed by Austria which fought in 47 of them; Spain in 44; and England in 43. Out of the 169 most important world battles fought since 387 BC, France has won 109, lost 49 and drawn 10. In the last few centuries, French strategic thinking has sometimes been driven by the need to attain or preserve the so-called "natural frontiers," which are the Pyrenees to the southwest, the Alps to the southeast, and the Rhine River to the east. Starting with Clovis, 1,500 years of warfare and diplomacy has witnessed the accomplishment of most of these objectives. Warfare with other European powers was not always determined by these considerations, and often rulers of France extended their continental authority far beyond these barriers, most notably under Charlemagne, Louis XIV, and Napoleon. These periods of incessant conflict were characterized by their own standards and conventions, but all required strong central leadership in order to permit the extension of French rule. Important military rivalries in human history have come about as a result of conflict between French peoples and other European powers. Anglo-French rivalry, for prestige in Europe and around the world, continued for centuries, while the more recent Franco-German rivalry required two world wars to stabilize.

Animated map showing growth and decline of the French colonial empire

Starting in the early 16th century, much of France's military efforts were dedicated to securing its overseas possessions and putting down dissent among both French colonists and native populations. French troops were spread all across its empire, primarily to deal with the local population. The French colonial empire ultimately disintegrated after the failed attempt to subdue Algerian nationalists in the late 1950s, a failure that led to the collapse of the Fourth Republic. Since World War II, France's efforts have been directed at maintaining its status as a great power and its influence on the UN Security Council. France has also been instrumental in attempting to unite the armed forces of Europe for their own defense in order to both balance the power of Russia and to lessen European military dependence on the United States. For example, France withdrew from NATO in 1966 over complaints that its role in the organization was being subordinated to the demands of the United States. French objectives in this era have undergone major shifts. Unencumbered by continental wars or intricate alliances, France now deploys its military forces as part of international peacekeeping operations, security enforcers in former colonies, or maintains them combat ready and mobilized to respond to threats from rogue states. France is a nuclear power with the largest nuclear arsenal in Europe, and its nuclear capabilities, just like its conventional forces, have been restructured to rapidly deal with emerging threats.

== Early period ==
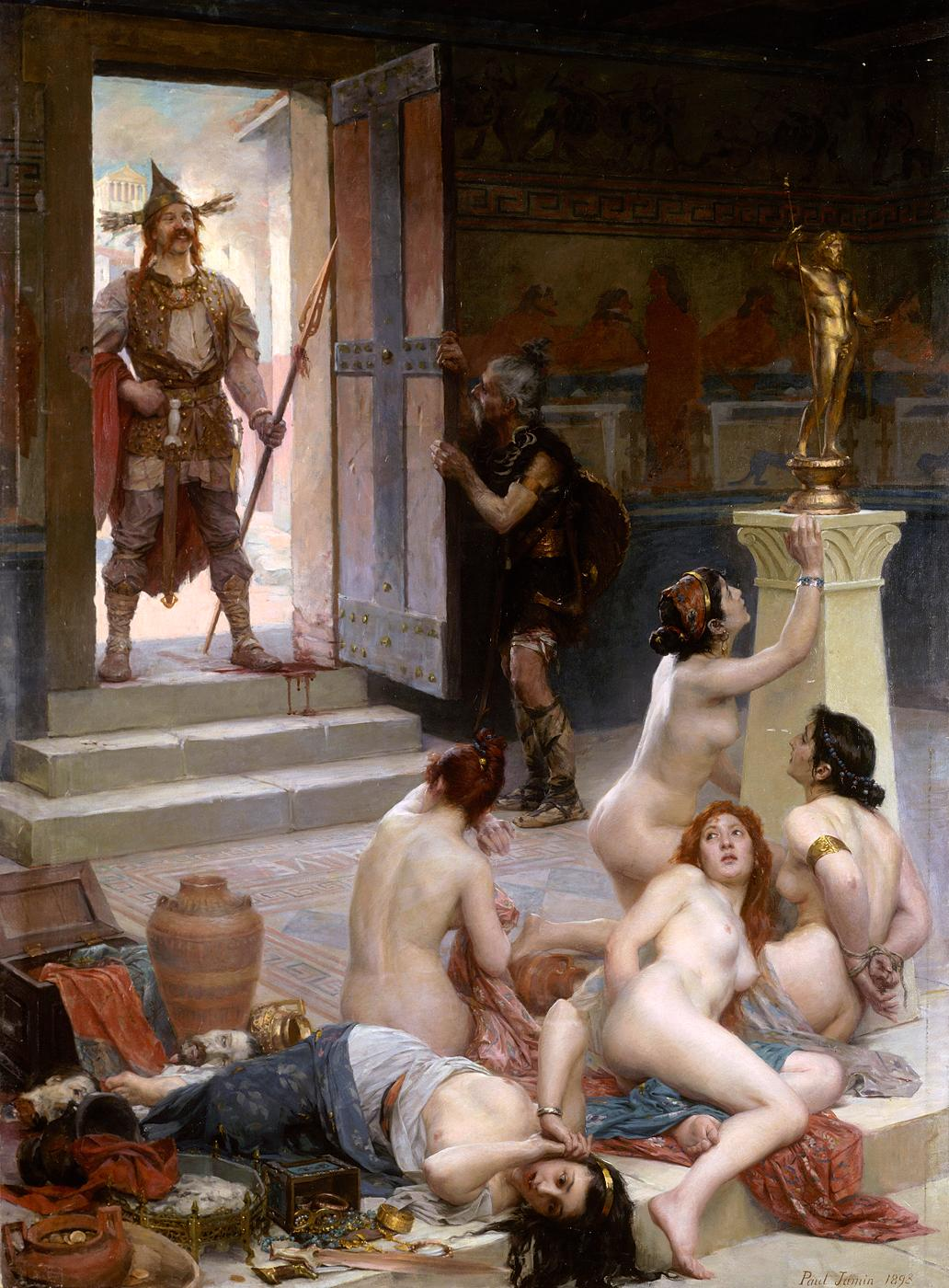
Brennus and His Share of the Spoils by Paul Jamin. Brennus and the sack of Rome as imagined in the 19th century

Around 390 BC, the Gallic chieftain Brennus made his own way through the Alps, defeated the Romans in the Battle of the Allia and sacked Rome for several months. The Gallic invasion left Rome weakened and encouraged several subdued Italian tribes to rebel. One by one, over the course of the next 50 years, these tribes were defeated and brought back under Roman dominion. Meanwhile, the Gauls would continue to harass the region until 345 BC, when they entered into a formal treaty with Rome. But Romans and Gauls would maintain an adversarial relationship for the next several centuries and the Gauls would remain a threat in Italia.

Around 125 BC, the south of France is conquered by the Romans who called this region Provincia Romana ("Roman Province"), which evolved into the name Provence in French. Brennus' sack of Rome was still remembered by Romans, when Julius Caesar conquered the remainder of Gaul. Initially Caesar met with little Gallic resistance: the 60 or so tribes that made up Gaul were unable to unite and defeat the Roman army, something Caesar exploited by pitting one tribe against another. In 58 BC, Caesar defeated the Germanic tribe of the Suebi, which was led by Ariovistus. The following year he conquered the Belgian Gauls after claiming that they were conspiring against Rome. The string of victories continued in a naval triumph against the Veneti in 56 BC. In 53 BC, a united Gallic resistance movement under Vercingetorix emerged for the first time. Caesar laid siege to the fortified city of Avaricum (Bourges) and broke through the defenses after 25 days, with only 800 out of the 40,000 inhabitants managing to escape. He then besieged Gergovia, Vercingetorix's home town, and suffered one of the worst defeats in his career when he had to retreat to suppress a revolt in another part of Gaul. After returning, Caesar surrounded Vercingetorix at Alesia in 52 BC. The townspeople were starved into submission and Caesar's unique defensive earthworks, protruding towards the city and away from it in order to stop a massive Gallic relief force, eventually forced Vercingetorix to surrender. The Gallic Wars were over.

Gallo-Roman culture settled over the region in the next few centuries, but as Roman power weakened in the 4th and 5th centuries AD, a Germanic tribe, the Franks, overran large areas that today form modern France. Under King Clovis I in the late 5th and early 6th centuries, Frankish dominions quadrupled as they managed to defeat successive opponents for control of Gaul. In 486 the Frankish armies under Clovis triumphed over Syagrius, the last Roman official in Northern Gaul, at the Battle of Soissons. In 491 Clovis defeated Thuringians east of his territories. In 496 he overcame the Alamanni at the Battle of Tolbiac. In 507 he scored the most impressive victory in his career, prevailing at the Battle of Vouillé against the Visigoths, who were led by Alaric II, the conqueror of Spain.

Frankish expansion from the early Clovis I' kingdom (481) to the divisions of Charlemagne's Empire (843/870)

Following Clovis, territorial divisions in the Frankish domain sparked intense rivalry between the western part of the kingdom, Neustria, and the eastern part, Austrasia. The two were sometimes united under one king, but from the 6th to the 8th centuries they often warred against each other. Early in the 8th century, the Franks were preoccupied with Islamic invasions across the Pyrenees and up the Rhone Valley. Two key battles during this period were the Battle of Toulouse and the Battle of Tours, both won by the Franks, and both instrumental in slowing Islamic incursions.

Under Charlemagne the Franks reached the height of their power. After campaigns against Lombards, Avars, Saxons, and Basques, the resulting Carolingian Empire stretched from the Pyrenees to Central Germany, from the North Sea to the Adriatic. In 800 the Pope made Charlemagne Emperor of the West in return for protection of the Church. The Carolingian Empire was a conscious effort to recreate a central administration modeled on that of the Roman Empire, but the motivations behind military expansion differed. Charlemagne hoped to provide his nobles an incentive to fight by encouraging looting on campaign. Plunder and spoils of war were stronger temptations than imperial expansion, and several regions were invaded over and over in order to bolster the coffers of Frankish nobility. Cavalry dominated the battlefields, and while the high costs associated with equipping horses and horse-riders helped limit their numbers, Carolingian armies maintained an average size of 20,000 during peacetime by recruiting infantry from imperial territories near theaters of operation, swelling to more with the levies called upon when at war. The Empire lasted from 800 to 843, when, following Frankish tradition, it was split between the sons of Louis the Pious by the Treaty of Verdun.

== Middle Ages ==
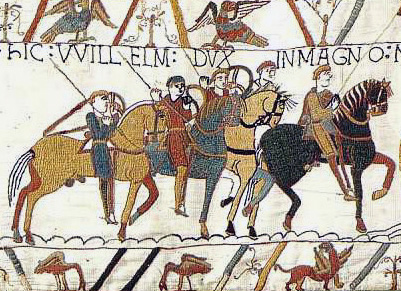
A section of the Bayeux Tapestry chronicling the Norman victory at Hastings

Military history during this period paralleled the rise and eventual fall of the armored knight. Following Charlemagne and the breakdown of the Frankish Empire due to civil war and ceaseless Viking incursions, the larger and more logistically difficult to maintain infantry-based armies were abandoned in favor of cavalry supplemented by an improvement in armor: leather and steel, steel helmets, coats of mail, and even full armor added to the defensive capabilities of mounted forces. A smaller and more mobile elite cavalry force quickly grew to be the most important component of armies within French territories and most of the rest of Europe, with the shock charge they provided becoming the standard tactic on the battlefield when it was invented in the 11th century. At the same time, the development of agricultural techniques allowed the nations of Western Europe to radically increase food production, facilitating the growth of a particularly large aristocracy under Capetian France. The rise of castles, which began in France during the 10th century, was partly caused by the inability of centralized authorities to control these emerging dukes and aristocrats. While all vassals and knights were in theory bound to fight for their sovereign when called upon, this period was marked by many feudal local and regional lords using the knights and levied conscripts below them to fight amongst each other, often in defiance or even outright rebellion towards their sovereign. After campaigns designed for plundering, attacking and defending, castles became the dominant feature of medieval warfare.

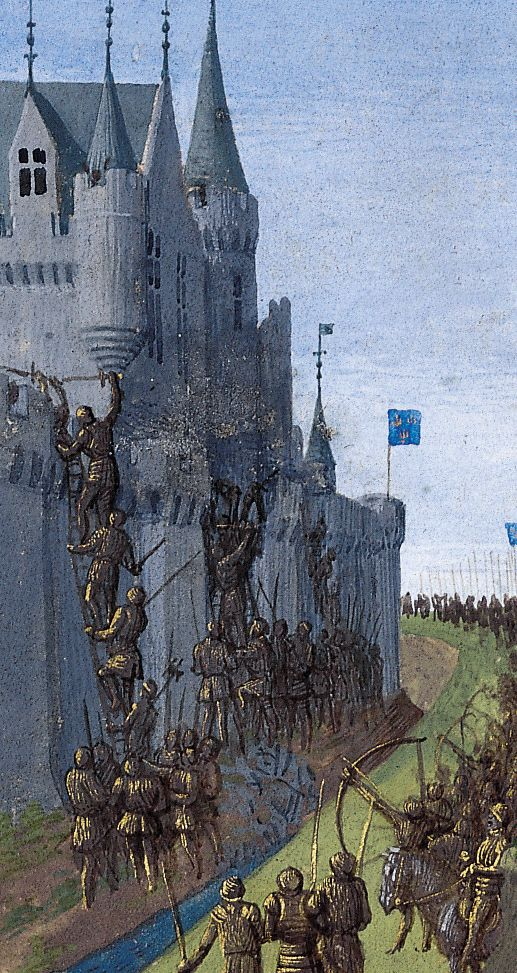
Castles were the most important defensive structures during the Middle Ages, making them a valuable target for any invading army.

During the Crusades, there were in fact too many armored knights in France for the land to support. Some scholars believe that one of the driving forces behind the Crusades was an attempt by such landless knights to find land overseas, without causing the type of internecine warfare that would largely damage France's increasing military strength. However, such historiographical work on the Crusades is being challenged and rejected by a large part of the historical community. The ultimate motivation or motivations for any one individual are difficult to know, but regardless, nobles and knights from France generally formed very sizeable contingents of crusading expeditions. Crusaders were so predominantly French that the word "crusader" in the Arabic language is simply known as Al-Franj or "The Franks" and Old French became the lingua franca of the Kingdom of Jerusalem.

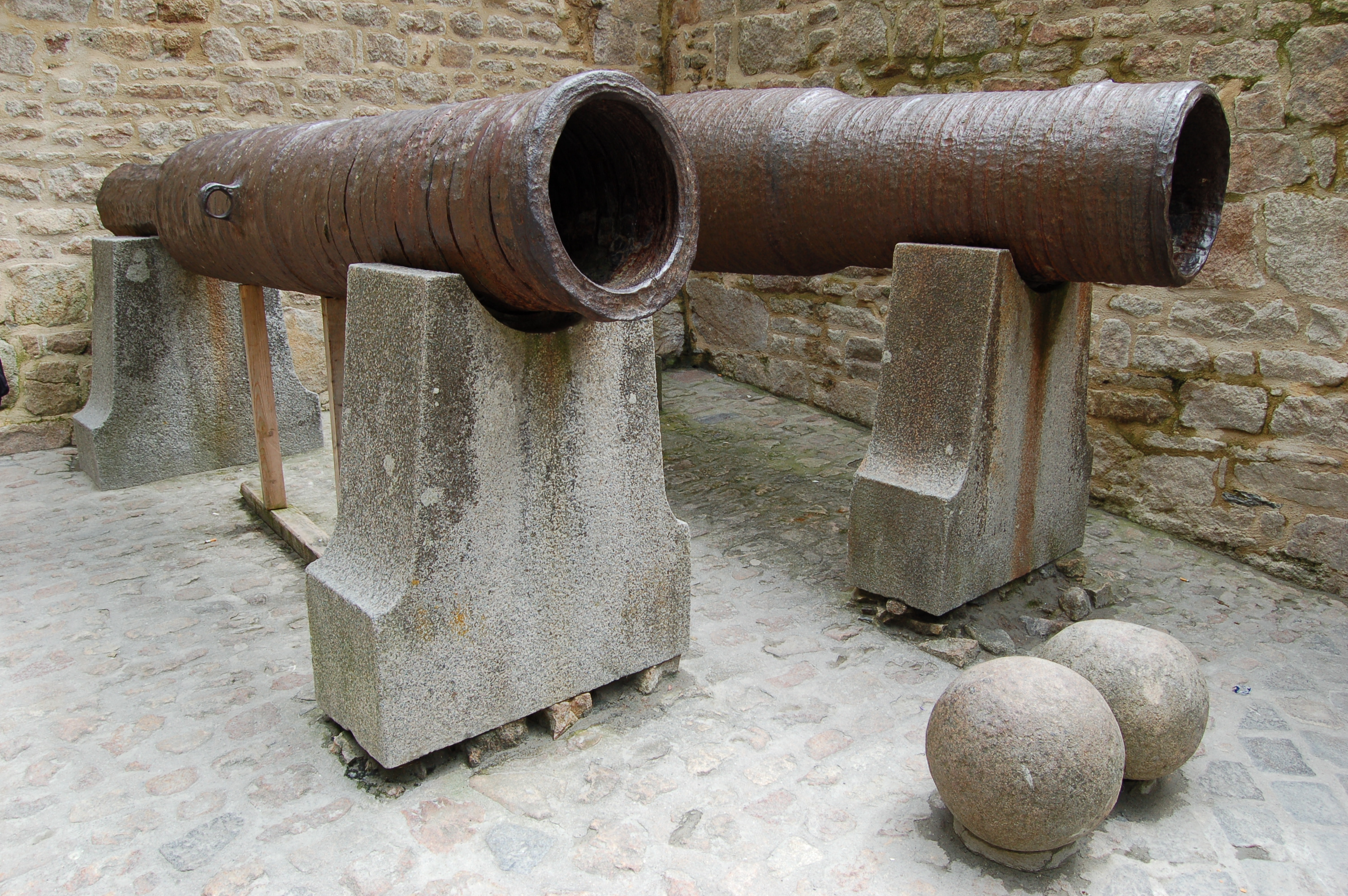
The advent of artillery, like these bombards at the Mont-Saint-Michel, greatly changed the techniques of warfare in the late Middle Ages.

In the 11th century, French knights wore knee-length mail and carried long lances and swords. The Norman knights fielded at the Battle of Hastings were more than a match for English forces, and their victory simply cemented their power and influence. Between 1202 and 1343, France reduced England's holdings on the continent to a few small provinces through a series of conflicts including the Bouvines Campaign (1202-1214), the Saintonge War (1242) and the War of Saint-Sardos (1324).

Improvements in armor over the centuries led to the establishment of plate armor by the 14th century, which was further developed more rigorously in the 15th century. However, by the late 14th century and the early 15th century, socioeconomic calamities such as the Black Death, and political crises such as the Jacquerie peasant revolt, and especially the Armagnac-Burgundian Civil War combined with numerous English invasions, all led to French military power declining during the first two phases of the Hundred Years' War. New weapons, including artillery, and tactics seemingly made the knight more of a sitting target than an effective battle force, but the often-praised longbowmen had little to do with the English success. Poor coordination or rough and soft, muddy terrain led to a number of bungled French assaults. The slaughter of knights at the Battle of Agincourt best exemplified this carnage. The French were able to field a much larger army of men-at-arms than their English counterparts, who had many longbowmen. Despite this, the French suffered about 6,000 casualties compared to a few hundred for the English because the narrow terrain prevented the tactical envelopments envisioned in recently discovered French plans for the battle. The French suffered a similar defeat at the Battle of the Golden Spurs against Flemish militia in 1302. When knights were allowed to effectively deploy and attack their opponents in the open field, however, they could be more useful, as at Cassel in 1328 or, even more decisively, at Bouvines in 1214, and Patay in 1429.

Popular conceptions of the third and final phase of the Hundred Years War are often dominated by the exploits of Joan of Arc, but French resurgence was rooted in multiple factors. French success in the Caroline war had been largely driven by a professional standing army that Charles V of France had been able to create and finance in the aftermath of the disastrous experience with the mercenary routiers who had pillaged much of the country after the 1360 peace. This force, the first standing army in post-classical western Europe, had been disbanded in the tumultuous regency period after 1380. Charles VII reestablished a permanent standing army in 1445 with the Compagnies d'ordonnance—cavalry units with 20 companies of 600 men each. The professional units gave the French a considerable edge in professionalism and discipline, being composed of paid full-time professional soldiers, at a time when the allegiances of the aristocratic knights would often shift to the opposing side. Strong French counterattacks and the withdrawal of Burgundian support for the English turned the tide of the war. The important victories of Orléans, Patay, Formigny and Castillon allowed the French to win back all English continental territories, except Calais, which was later captured by the French.

Equipment of medieval French sergeants was based on their property:

Property worth	Military equipment
L60+	Hauberk, helmet, sword, knife, spear, and shield
L30+	Gambeson, sword, knife, spear, and shield
L10+	Helmet, sword, knife, spear, and shield
L10<	Bow, arrows, and knife

== Ancien Régime ==
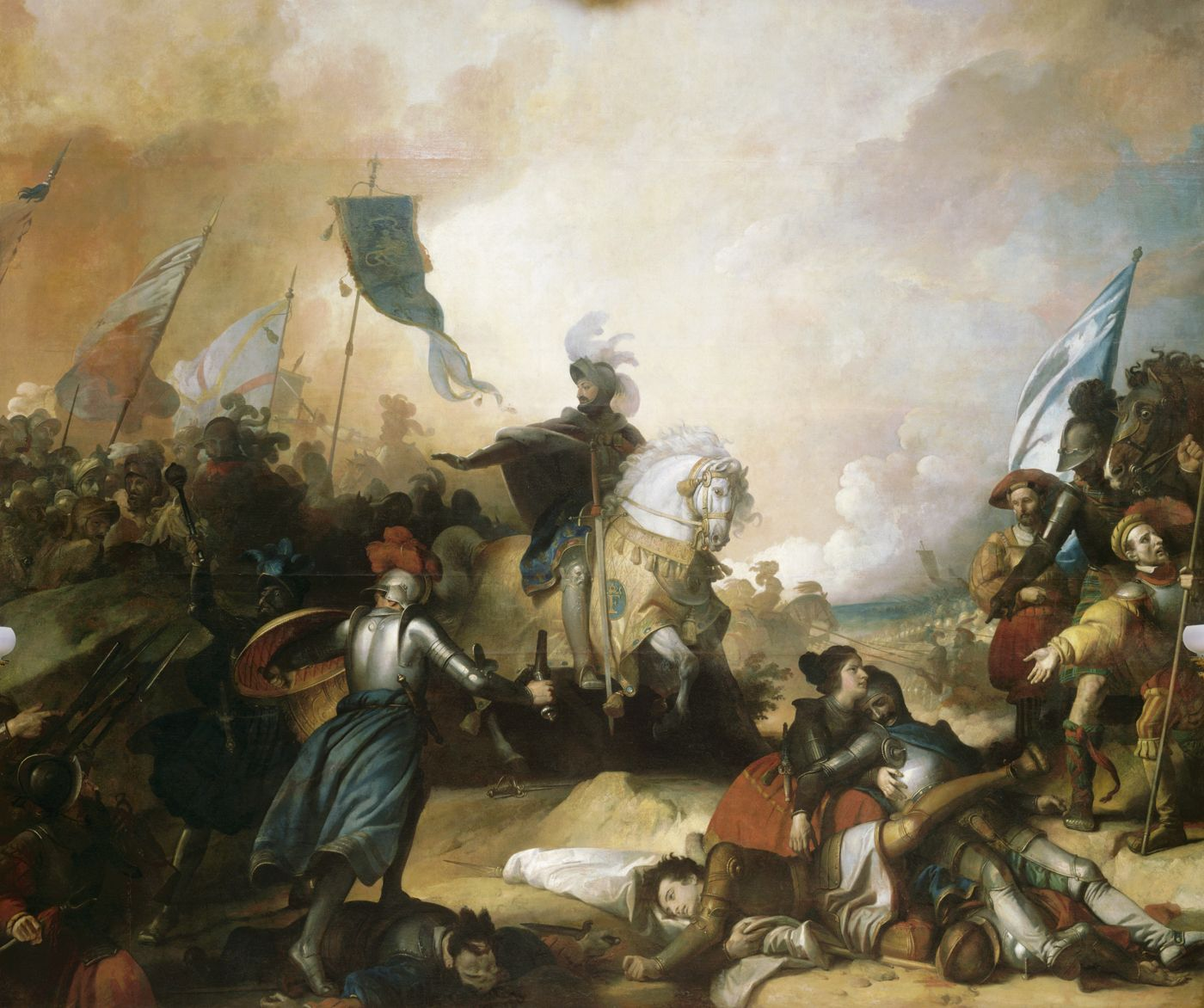
Francis I at the Battle of Marignan (1515)

The French Renaissance and the beginning of the Ancien Régime, normally marked by the reign of Francis I, saw the nation become far more unified under the monarch. The power of the nobles was diminished as a national army was created. With England expelled from the continent and being consumed by the Wars of the Roses, France's main rival was the Holy Roman Empire. This threat to France became alarming in 1516 when Charles V became the king of Spain, and grew worse when Charles was also elected Holy Roman Emperor in 1519. France was all but surrounded as Germany, Spain, and the Low Countries were controlled by the Habsburgs. The lengthy Italian Wars that took place during this period eventually resulted in defeat for France and established Catholic Spain, which formed a branch of the Habsburg holdings, as the most powerful nation in Europe, with their dreaded tercios dominating the European battlefield well into the Thirty Years War. Later in the 16th century, France was weakened internally by the Wars of Religion. As nobles managed to raise their own private armies, these conflicts between Huguenots and Catholics all but demolished centralization and monarchical authority, precluding France from remaining a powerful force in European affairs. On the battlefield, the religious conflicts highlighted the influence of the gendarmes, heavy cavalry units that comprised the majority of cavalrymen attached to the main field armies. The pride of the royal cavalry, gendarme companies were often attached to the main royal army in hopes of inflicting a decisive defeat on Huguenot forces, although secondary detachments were also used for scouting and intercepting enemy troops.

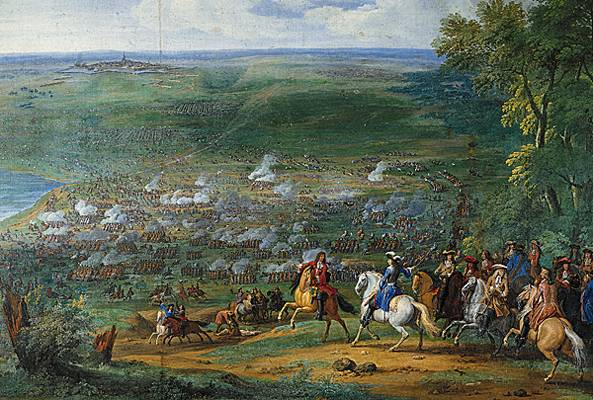
The Battle of Rocroi in (1643)

After the Wars of Religion, France could do little to challenge the dominance of the Holy Roman Empire, although the empire itself faced several problems. From the east it was facing intense warfare against the Ottoman Empire, with which France formed an alliance. The vast Habsburg empire also proved impossible to manage effectively, and the crown was soon divided between the Spanish and Austrian holdings. In 1568, the Dutch declared independence, launching a war that would last for decades and would illustrate the weaknesses of Habsburg power. In the 17th century, the religious violence that had beset France a century earlier began to tear the empire apart. At first France sat on the sidelines, but under Cardinal Richelieu it saw an opportunity to advance its own interests at the expense of the Habsburgs. Despite France's staunch Catholicism, it intervened on the side of the Protestants. The Thirty Years' War was long and extremely bloody, but France and its allies came out victorious, under the leadership of the legendary commanders Condé and Turenne, beginning a long line of unparalleled French marshals who would help usher in a new era of military strategy. After their victory, France emerged as the sole dominant European power under the reign of Louis XIV. In parallel, French explorers, such as Jacques Cartier or Samuel de Champlain, claimed lands in the Americas for France, paving the way for the expansion of the French colonial empire.

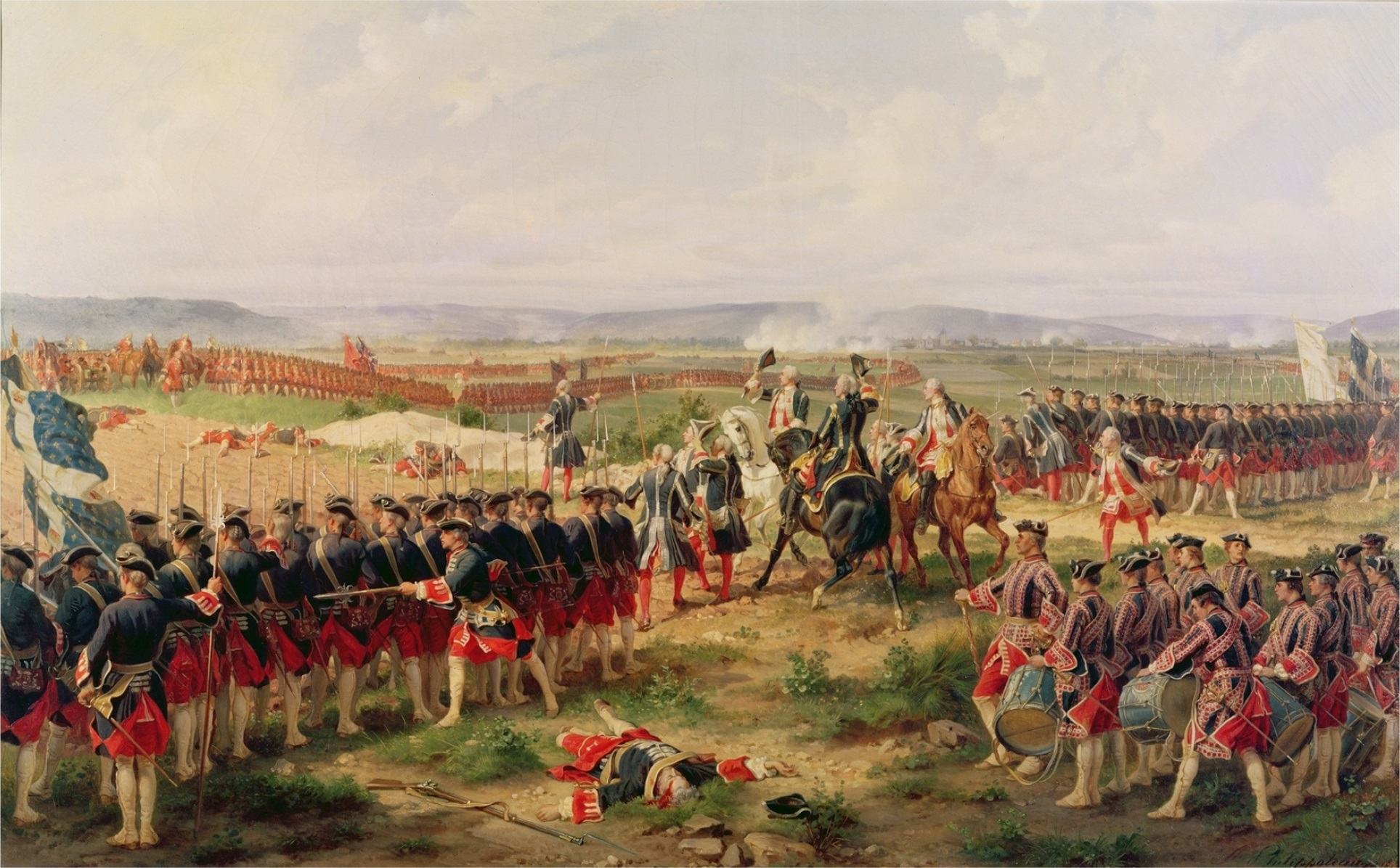
The Battle of Fontenoy (1745), during the War of the Austrian Succession

The long reign of Louis XIV saw a series of conflicts: the War of Devolution, the Franco-Dutch War, the War of the Reunions, the Nine Years War, and the War of the Spanish Succession. Few of these wars were either clear victories or definite defeats, but French borders expanded steadily anyway. The west bank of the Rhine, much of the Spanish Netherlands, and a good deal of Luxembourg were annexed while the War of the Spanish Succession saw the grandson of Louis placed on the throne of Spain. The French strategic situation, however, changed decisively with the Glorious Revolution in England, which replaced a pro-French king with an enemy of Louis, the Dutch William of Orange. After a period of two centuries seeing only rare hostilities with France, England now became a consistent enemy again, and remained so until the 19th century. To stop French advances, England formed coalitions with several other European powers, most notably the Habsburgs. While these armies had difficulties against the French on land, the British Royal Navy dominated the seas, and France lost many of its colonial holdings. The British economy also became Europe's most powerful, and British money funded the campaigns of their continental allies.

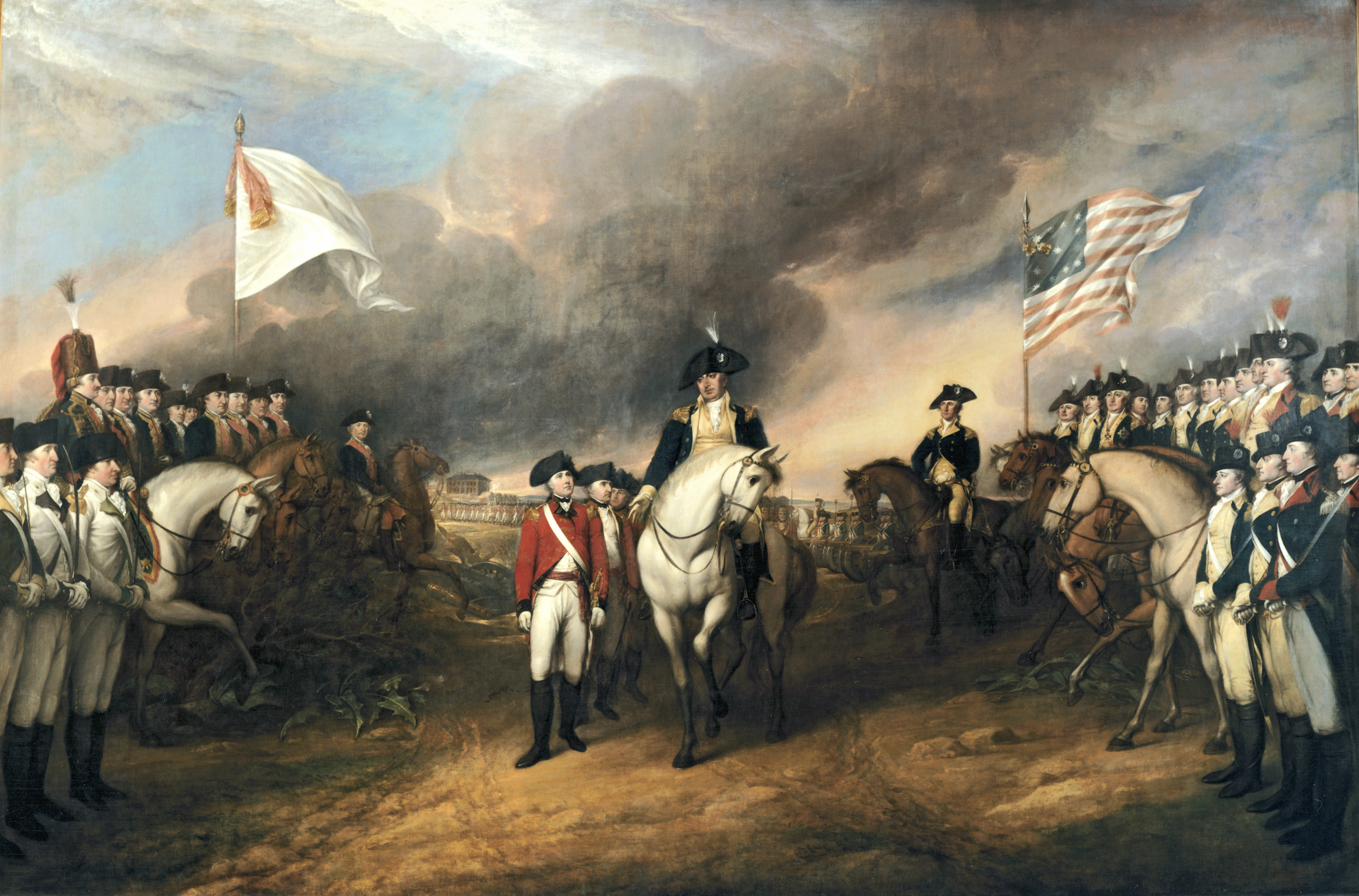
Surrender of Lord Cornwallis to French troops (left) and American troops (right), at Yorktown (1781)

Wars in this era consisted mostly of sieges and movements that were rarely decisive, prompting the French military engineer Vauban to design an intricate network of fortifications for the defense of France. The armies of Louis XIV were some of the most impressive in French history, their quality reflecting militaristic as well political developments. In the mid-17th century, royal power reasserted itself and the army became a tool through which the King could wield authority, replacing older systems of mercenary units and the private forces of recalcitrant nobles. Military administration also made gigantic progress as food supply, clothing, equipment, and armaments were provided in a regularity never before equaled. In fact, the French embedded this standardization by becoming the first army to give their soldiers national uniforms in the 1680s and 1690s.

The 18th century saw France remain the dominant power in Europe, but begin to falter largely because of internal problems. The country engaged in a long series of wars, such as the War of the Quadruple Alliance, the War of the Polish Succession, and the War of the Austrian Succession, but these conflicts gained France little. Meanwhile, Britain's power steadily increased, and a new force, Prussia, became a major threat. This change in the balance of power led to the Diplomatic Revolution of 1756, when France and the Habsburgs forged an alliance after centuries of animosity. This alliance proved less than effective in the Seven Years' War, but in the American Revolutionary War, the French helped inflict a major defeat on the British.

== Revolutionary France ==
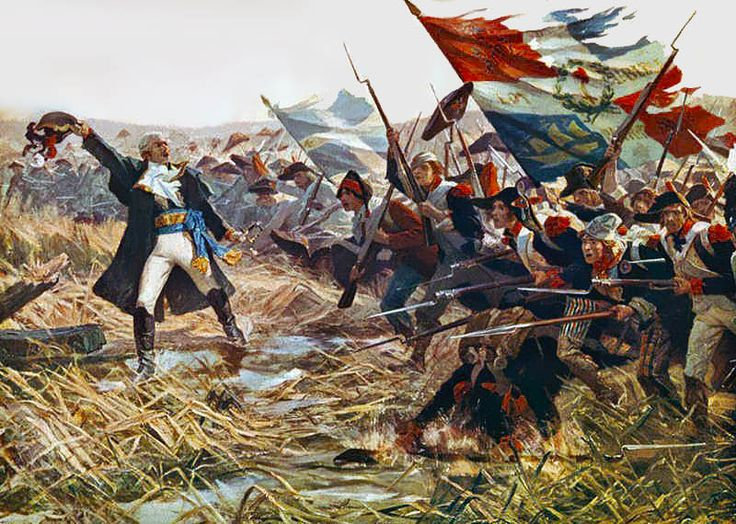
The armies of the Revolution at Jemappes in 1792. With chaos internally and enemies on the borders, the French were in a jittery state in 1792. By 1797, however, they had exported their ideology (and the army that followed it) to the Low Countries and Northern Italy.

The French Revolution, true to its name, revolutionized nearly all aspects of French and European life. The powerful sociopolitical forces unleashed by a people seeking liberté, égalité, and fraternité made certain that even warfare was not spared this upheaval. 18th-century armies—with their rigid protocols, static operational strategy, unenthusiastic soldiers, and aristocratic officer classes—underwent massive remodeling as the French monarchy and nobility gave way to liberal assemblies obsessed with external threats. In 1790 the officer corps was opened to all classes and a new generation of lower birth soldiers rose rapidly in the ranks during the following wars. The fundamental shifts in warfare that occurred during the period have prompted scholars to identify the era as the beginning of "modern war".

In 1791 the Legislative Assembly passed the "Drill-Book" legislation, implementing a series of infantry doctrines created by French theorists because of their defeat by the Prussians in the Seven Years' War. The new developments hoped to exploit the intrinsic bravery of the French soldier, made even more powerful by the explosive nationalist forces of the Revolution. The changes also placed a faith on the ordinary soldier that would be completely unacceptable in earlier times; French troops were expected to harass the enemy and remain loyal enough to not desert, a benefit other Ancien Régime armies did not have. Following the declaration of war in 1792, an imposing array of enemies converging on French borders prompted the government in Paris to adopt radical measures. August 23, 1793, would become a historic day in military history; on that date the National Convention called a levée en masse, or mass conscription, for the first time in human history. By summer of the following year, conscription made some 500,000 men available for service and the French began to deal blows to their European enemies.

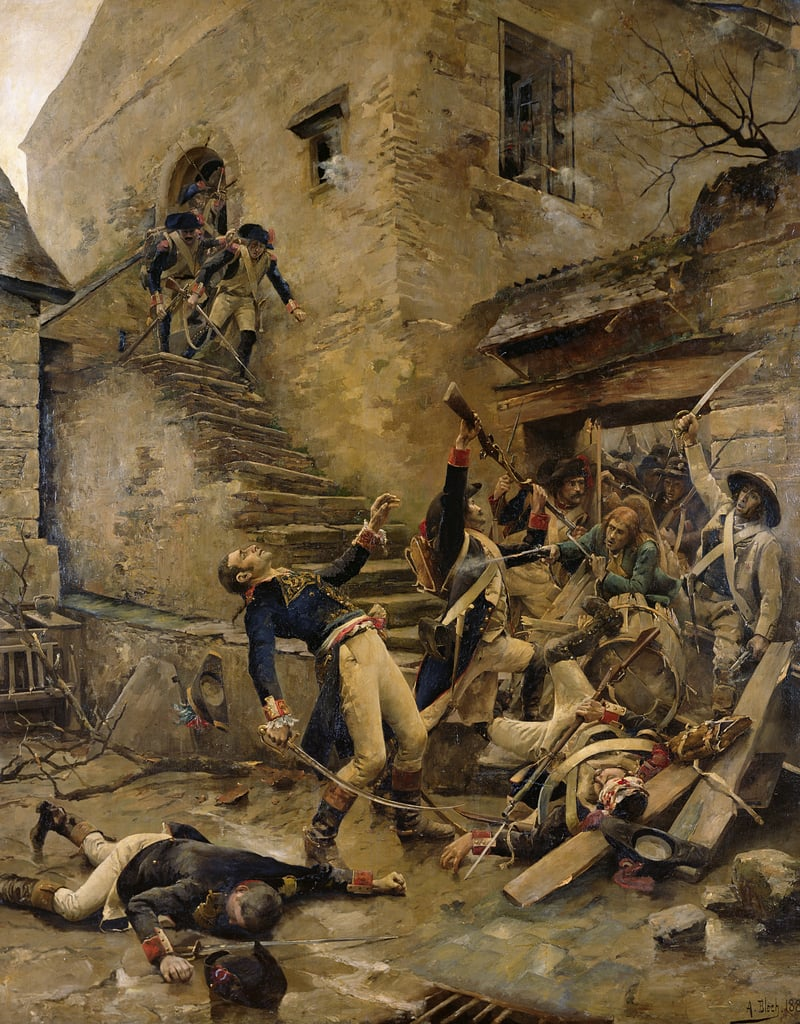
An episode (Battle of Entrames) of the civil war between republicans and royalists during the French Revolutionary Wars

Armies during the Revolution became noticeably larger than their Holy Roman counterparts, and combined with the new enthusiasm of the troops, the tactical and strategic opportunities became profound. By 1797 the French had defeated the First Coalition, occupied the Low Countries, the west bank of the Rhine, and Northern Italy, objectives which had defied the Valois and Bourbon dynasties for centuries. Unsatisfied with the results, many European powers formed a Second Coalition, but by 1801 this too had been decisively beaten. Another key aspect of French success was the changes wrought in the officer classes. Traditionally, European armies left major command positions to those who could be trusted, namely, the aristocracy. The hectic nature of the French Revolution, however, tore apart France's old army, meaning new men were required to become officers and commanders.

Besides opening a flood of tactical and strategic opportunities, the Revolutionary Wars also laid the foundation for modern military theory. Later authors that wrote about "nations in arms" drew inspiration from the French Revolution, in which dire circumstances seemingly mobilized the entire French nation for war and incorporated nationalism into the fabric of military history. Although the reality of war in the France of 1795 would be different from that in the France of 1915, conceptions and mentalities of war evolved significantly. Clausewitz correctly analyzed the Revolutionary and Napoleonic eras to give posterity a thorough and complete theory of war that emphasized struggles between nations occurring everywhere, from the battlefield to the legislative assemblies, and to the very way that people think. War now emerged as a vast panorama of physical and psychological forces heading for victory or defeat.

== Napoleonic France ==
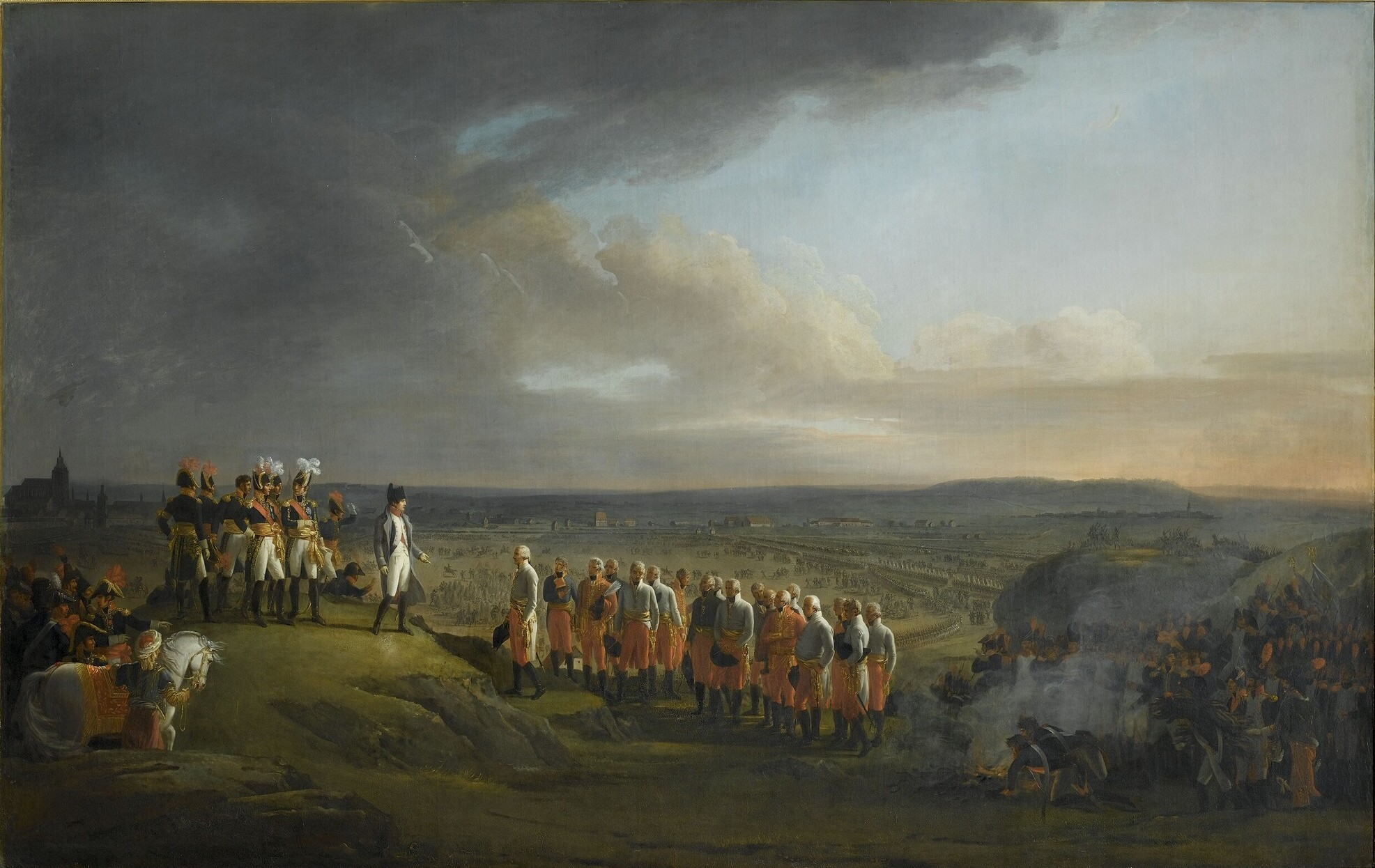
Napoleon and the Grande Armée receive the surrender of Austrian General Mack after the Battle of Ulm in October 1805. The decisive finale of the Ulm Campaign raised the tally of captured Austrian soldiers to 60,000. With the Austrian army destroyed, Vienna would fall to the French in November.

The Napoleonic Era saw French power and influence reach immense heights, even though the period of domination was relatively brief. In the century and a half preceding the Revolutionary Era, France had transformed demographic leverage to military and political weight; the French population was 19 million in 1700, but this had grown to over 29 million in 1800, much higher than that of most other European powers. These numbers permitted France to raise armies at a rapid pace should the need arise. Furthermore, military innovations carried out during the Revolution and the Consulate, evidenced by improvements in artillery and cavalry capabilities on top of better army and staff organization, gave the French army a decisive advantage in the initial stages of the Napoleonic Wars. Another ingredient of success was Napoleon Bonaparte himself—intelligent, charismatic, and a military genius, Napoleon absorbed the latest military theories of the day and applied them in the battlefield with deadly effect.

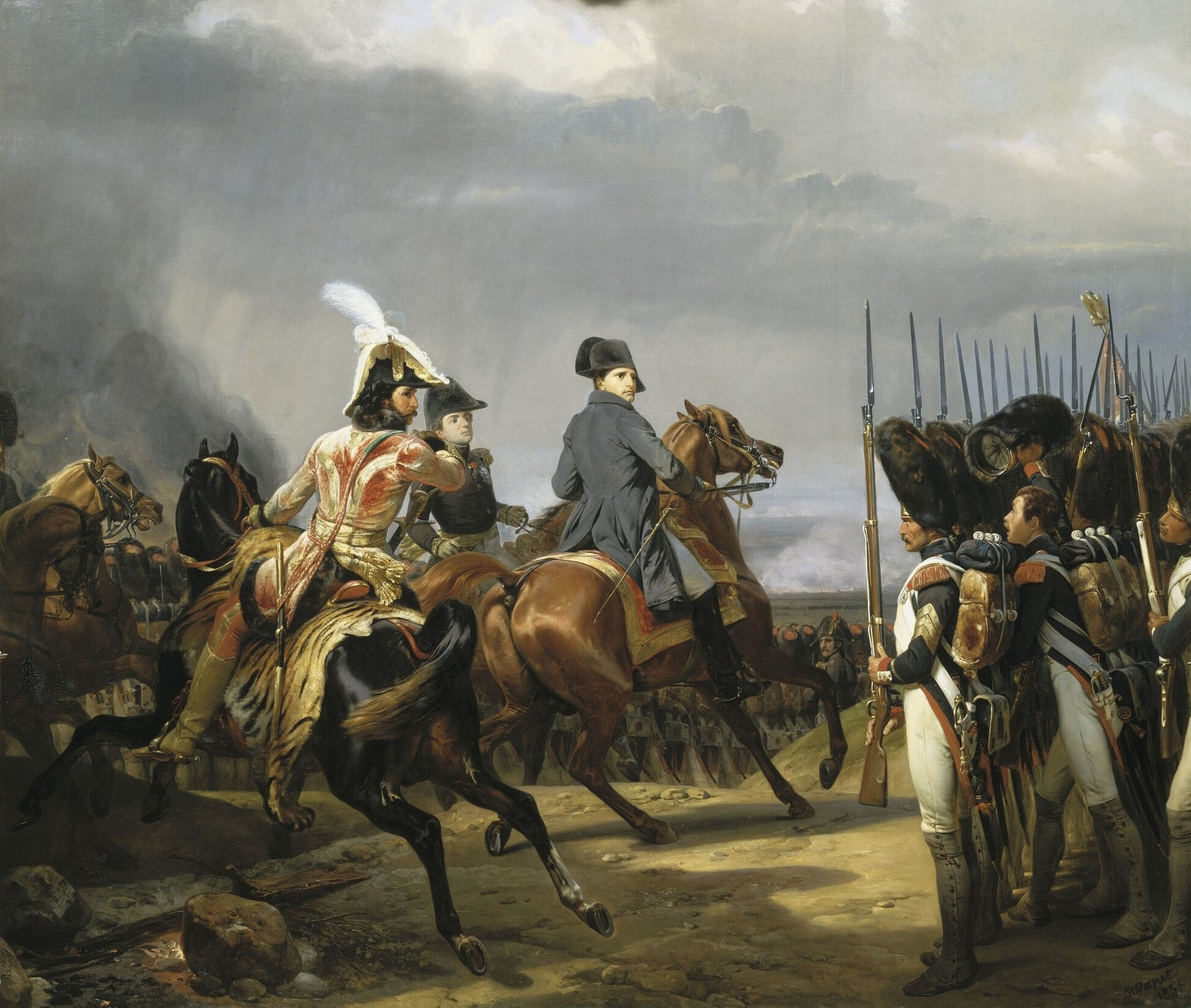
The Battle of Jena by Horace Vernet. Napoleon I at the battle of Jena (1806) which led to the occupation of Prussia

Napoleon inherited an army that was based on conscription and used huge masses of poorly trained troops, which could usually be readily replaced. By 1805 the French Army was a truly lethal force, with many in its ranks veterans of the French Revolutionary Wars. Two years of constant drilling for an invasion of England helped to build a well-trained, well-led army. The Imperial Guard served as an example for the rest of the army and consisted of Napoleon's best handpicked soldiers. Napoleon's huge losses suffered during the disastrous Russian campaign would have destroyed any professional commander of the day, but those losses were quickly replaced with new draftees. After Napoleon, nations planned for huge armies with professional leadership and a constant supply of new soldiers, which had huge human costs when improved weapons like the rifled musket replaced the inaccurate muskets of Napoleon's day during the American Civil War.

French Empire, 1811. The French Empire is in dark green while the "Grand Empire" includes satellite states and areas under French military control (light green).

This large size came at a cost, as the logistics of feeding a huge army made them especially dependent on supplies. Most armies of the day relied on the supply-convoy system established during the Thirty Years' War by Gustavus Adolphus. This limited mobility, since the soldiers had to wait for the convoys, but it did keep possibly mutinous troops from deserting, and thus helped preserve an army's composure. However, Napoleon's armies were so large that feeding them using the old method proved ineffective, and consequently, French troops were allowed to live off the land. Infused with new concepts of nation and service. Napoleon often attempted to wage decisive, quick campaigns so that he could allow his men to live off the land. The French army did use a convoy system, but it was stocked with very few days worth of food; Napoleon's troops were expected to march quickly, effect a decision on the battlefield, then disperse to feed. For the Russian campaign, the French did store 24 days' worth of food before beginning active operations, but this campaign was the exception, not the rule.

Napoleon's biggest influence in the military sphere was in the conduct of warfare. Weapons and technology remained largely static through the Revolutionary and Napoleonic eras, but 18th-century operational strategy underwent massive restructuring. Sieges became infrequent to the point of near-irrelevance, a new emphasis arose towards the destruction of enemy armies as well as their outmaneuvering, and invasions of enemy territory occurred over broader fronts, thus introducing a plethora of strategic opportunities that made wars costlier and, just as importantly, more decisive. Defeat for a European power now meant much more than losing isolated enclaves. Near-Carthaginian treaties intertwined whole national efforts—social, political, economic, and militaristic—into gargantuan collisions that severely upset international conventions as understood at the time. Napoleon's initial success sowed the seeds for his downfall. Not used to such catastrophic defeats in the rigid power system of 18th-century Europe, many nations found existence under the French yoke difficult, sparking revolts, wars, and general instability that plagued the continent until 1815, when the forces of reaction finally triumphed at the Battle of Waterloo.

== French colonial empire ==
Map of the first (green) and second (blue) French colonial empires

The history of French colonial imperialism can be divided in two major eras: the first from the early 17th century to the middle of the 18th century, and the second from the early 19th century to the middle of the 20th century. In the first phase of expansion, France concentrated its efforts mainly in North America, the Caribbean and India, setting up commercial ventures that were backed by military force. Following defeat in the Seven Years' War, France lost its possessions in North America and India, but it did manage to keep the wealthy Caribbean islands of Saint-Domingue, Guadeloupe, and Martinique.

The second stage began with the conquest of Algeria in 1830, then with the establishment of French Indochina (covering modern Vietnam, Laos, and Cambodia) and a string of military victories in the Scramble for Africa, where it established control over regions covering much of West Africa, Central Africa and Maghreb. In 1914 France had an empire stretching over 13,000,000 km^{2} (5,000,000 sq mi) (6,000,000 mile²) of land and about 110 million people. Following victory in World War I, Togo and most of Cameroon were also added to the French possessions, and Syria and Lebanon became French mandates. For most of the period from 1870 to 1945, France was territorially the third largest nation on Earth, after Britain and Russia (later the Soviet Union), and had the most overseas possessions following Britain. Following the Second World War, France struggled to preserve French territories but wound up losing the First Indochina War (the precursor to the Vietnam War) and granting independence to Algeria after a long war. Today, France still maintains a number of overseas territories, but their collective size is barely a shadow of the old French colonial empire.

== From 1815 ==
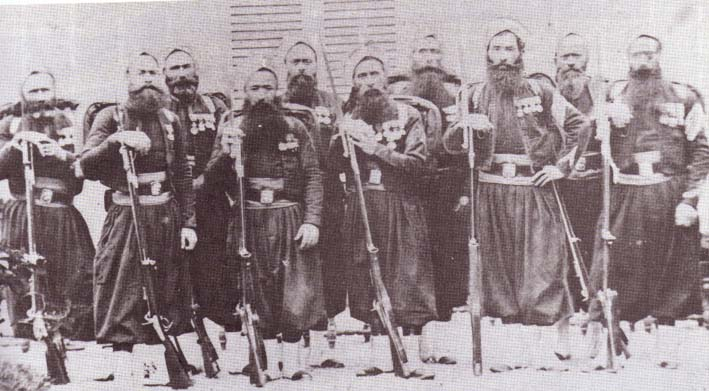
French Zouaves during the Franco-Austrian War (1859)

After the exile of Napoleon, the freshly restored Bourbon monarchy helped the absolute Bourbon king of Spain to recover his throne during the French intervention in Spain in 1823. To restore the prestige of the French monarchy, disputed by the Revolution and the First Empire, Charles X engaged in the military conquest of Algeria in 1830. This marked the beginning of a new expansion of the French colonial empire throughout the 19th century. In that century, France remained a major force in continental affairs. After the 1830 July Revolution, the liberal king Louis Philippe I victoriously supported the Spanish and Belgian liberals in 1831. The French later inflicted a defeat on the Habsburgs in the Franco-Austrian War of 1859, a victory which led to the unification of Italy in 1861, after having triumphed over Russia with other allies in the Crimean War 1854–56. Detrimentally, however, the French army emerged from these victories in an overconfident and complacent state. France's defeat in the Franco-Prussian War led to the loss of Alsace-Lorraine and the creation of a united German Empire, both results representing major failures in long-term French foreign policy and sparking a vengeful, nationalist revanchism meant to earn back former territories. The Dreyfus Affair, however, mitigated these nationalist tendencies by prompting public skepticism about the competence of the military.

=== First World War ===
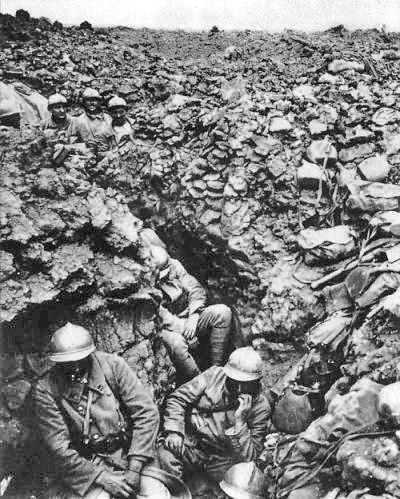
French soldiers in a trench, during the Battle of Verdun (1916)

In World War I, the French, with their allies, managed to hold the Western front and to counterattack on the Eastern front and in the colonies until the final defeat of the Central Powers and their allies. After major conflicts such as the Battle of the Frontiers, the First Battle of the Marne, the Battle of Verdun, and the Second Battle of the Aisne—the last resulting in tremendous loss of life and mutiny within the army—the French proved to be enough of a cohesive fighting force to counterattack and defeat the Germans at the Second Battle of the Marne, the first in what would become a string of Allied victories that ended the war. The Treaty of Versailles eventually returned Alsace-Lorraine to France. The French military, civilian and material losses during the First World War were huge. With more than 1.3 million military fatalities and more than 4.6 million wounded, France suffered the second highest Allied losses, after Russia. As a result, France was adamant on the payment of reparations by Germany. The organised failure of the Weimar Republic to pay reparations led to the Occupation of the Ruhr by French and Belgian forces.

=== Second World War ===
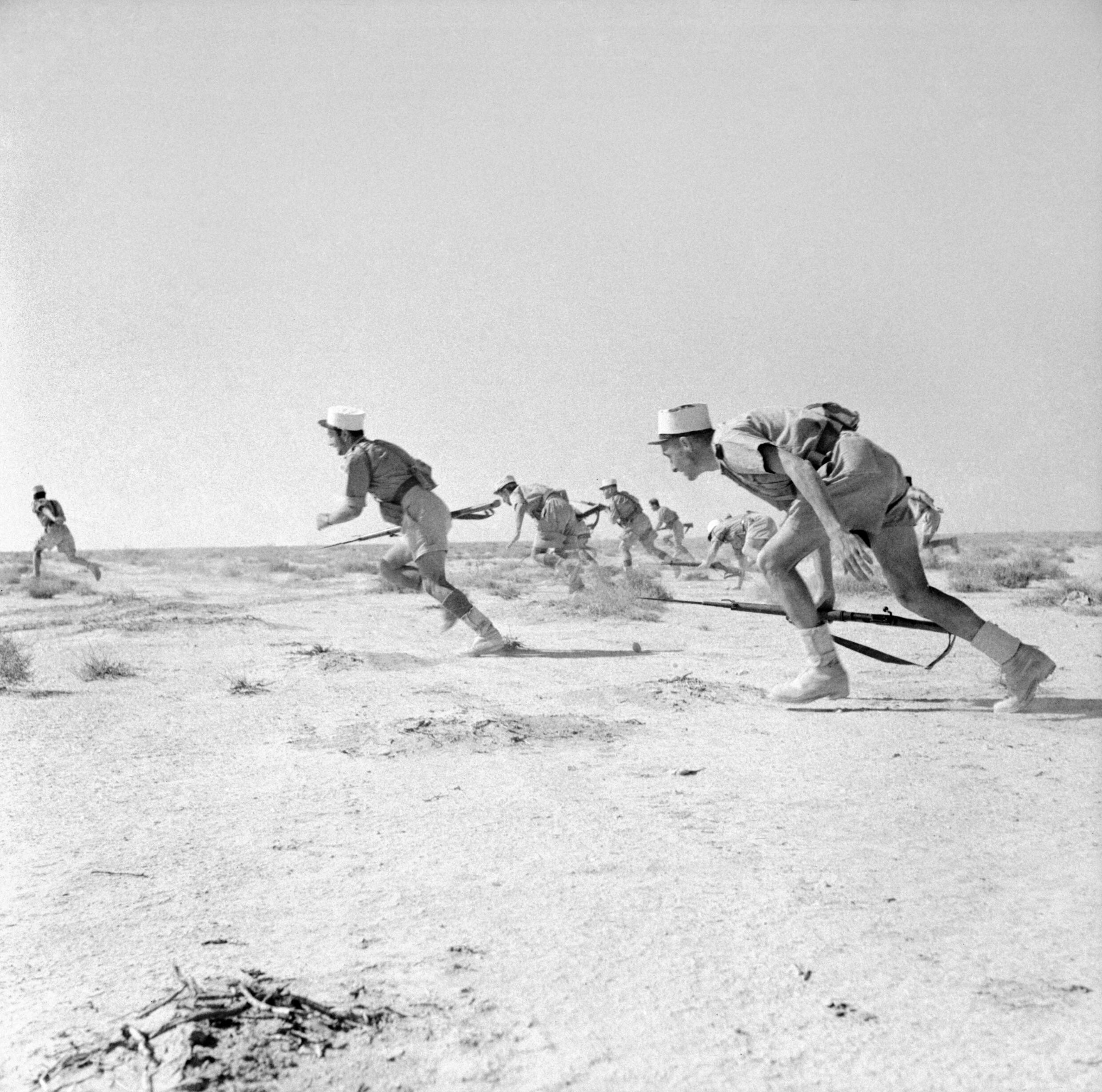
Free French Foreign Legionnaires at the Battle of Bir Hakeim (1942)

A variety of factors—ranging from smaller industrial base to low population growth and obsolete military doctrines—crippled the French effort at the outset of World War II. The Germans won the Battle of France in 1940 despite the French often having better planes and tanks than the Germans. Prior to the Battle of France, there were sentiments among many Allied soldiers, French and British, of pointless repetition; they viewed the war with dread since they had already beaten the Germans once, and images of that first major conflict were still poignant in military circles. The costs of World War I along with the now stale doctrine employed by the French Army (while the Germans were developing a doctrine which stressed initiative from junior commanders and combining different arms, the French sought to minimize casualties through a rigorously controlled type of battle and a top down command structure) forced the French to look for more defensive measures. The Maginot Line was the result of these deliberations: the French originally allocated three billion francs for the project, but by 1935 seven billion had been spent. The Maginot Line succeeded in holding off the German attack. However, while the French thought that the main weight of the German attack would arrive through central Belgium, and accordingly deployed their forces here, the assault actually came further south in the Ardennes forest. The Third Republic collapsed in the ensuing conflict.

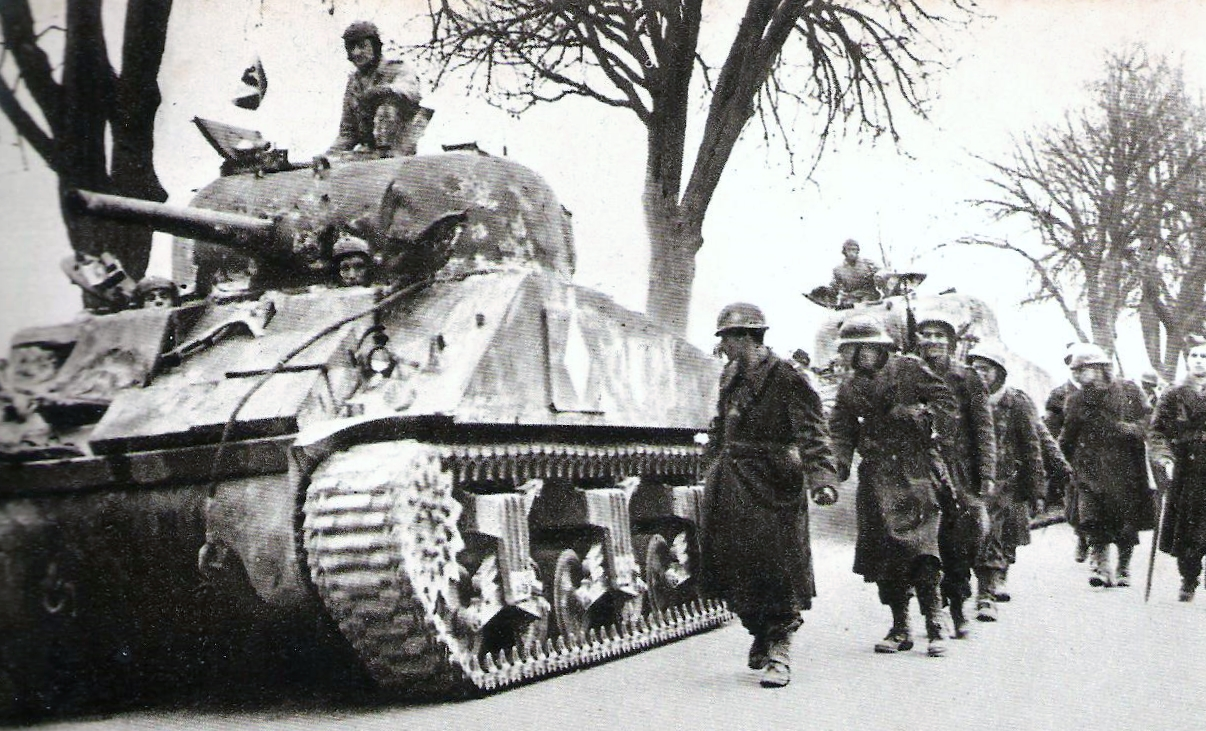
French forces advance in Colmar Pocket, 1945

After the defeat, Vichy France cooperated with the Axis powers until 1944. Charles de Gaulle exhorted the French people to join the allied armies, while the French Vichy forces participated in direct action against Allied forces, inflicting casualties in some cases.

The Normandy landings in that year were the first step towards the eventual liberation of France. The Free French Forces, under de Gaulle, had participated widely throughout previous campaigns, and their large size made them notable at the end of the war. As early as the winter of 1943, the Free French already had nearly 260,000 soldiers, and these numbers only grew as the war progressed. The French Resistance had also a significant contribution, participating also actively in the liberation of France. At the end of the war, France was given one of four occupation zones in Germany, in Berlin and Austria.

=== Post-1945 warfare ===
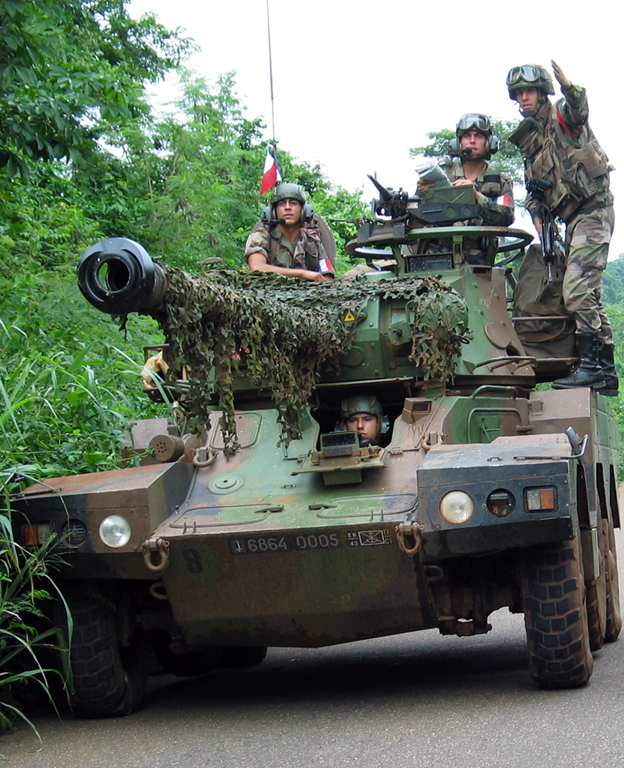
An ERC 90 Sagaie of the 1st Parachute Hussar Regiment in Côte d'Ivoire in 2003

Following the 1939–45 war, decolonization spread through the former European empires.

Following the First Indochina War, they withdrew from Vietnam, Laos and Cambodia. The military also tried to keep control of Algeria during the Algerian War, when French forces attempted to defeat the Algerian rebels. Despite its military victory, France granted independence to Algerians. French Algeria was home to over a million of settlers (known as Pieds-Noirs), de Gaulle's decision to grant independence to Algeria, almost led to a civil war, supported by various Pied-Noir, Harki and nationalist factions, including the FAF and the OAS. Related to and during the Algerian war France participated in the Suez Crisis with Israel and the UK.

By 1960 France had lost its direct military influence over all of its former colonies in Africa and Indochina. Nonetheless, several colonies in the Pacific, Caribbean, Indian Oceans and South America remain French territory to this day and France kept a form of indirect political influence in Africa colloquially known as the Françafrique.

As President of the French Republic, Charles de Gaulle oversaw the development of French atomic weapons and promoted a foreign policy independent of U.S. influence. He also withdrew France from the NATO military command in 1966—although remaining a member of the western alliance. The effect of withdrawal was reduced by continued cooperation between the French military and NATO, though France did not formally rejoin the NATO military command until 2009.

France intervened in various post-colonial conflicts, supporting former colonies (Western Sahara War, Shaba II, Chadian–Libyan conflict, Djiboutian Civil War), NATO peacekeeping missions in war-torn countries (UNPROFOR, KFOR, UNAMIR) and many humanitarian missions.

As a nuclear power and having some of the best trained and best equipped forces in the world, the French military has now met some of its primary objectives which are the defense of national territory, the protection of French interests abroad, and the maintenance of global stability. Conflicts indicative of these objectives are the Gulf War in 1991—when France sent 18,000 troops, 60 combat aircraft, 120 helicopters, and 40 tanks—and Mission Héraclès in the War in Afghanistan, along with recent interventions in Africa.

African interventions during the early 21st century include peacekeeping actions in Côte d'Ivoire, which involved brief direct fighting between the French and Ivorian armies in 2004; under the mandate of Nicolas Sarkozy, French forces returned to Côte d'Ivoire in 2011 to remove the Ivorian president. In the same year, France played a pivotal role in the 2011 military intervention in Libya against Muammar Gaddafi. The year after, France intervened in Mali during that country's civil war, as Islamist militants appeared to threaten the south after seizing control of the arid north. Changes in the government of France, including Socialist François Hollande becoming president in 2012 after years of center-right governance, have done little to alter Paris' foreign policy in Africa.

Hollande also proposed French military involvement in the Syrian civil war in the wake of chemical attacks French intelligence reports linked to the forces of President Bashar al-Assad in mid-2013.

France has encouraged military cooperation at an EU level, starting with the formation of the Franco-German Brigade in 1987 and Eurocorps in 1992, based in Strasbourg. In 2009 a battalion of German light infantry was moved to Alsace, the first time German troops had been stationed in France since the Nazi occupation of World War II. This process has not been immune to budget cuts—in October 2013 France announced the closure of her last infantry regiment in Germany, thus marking the end of a major presence across the Rhine although both countries will maintain around 500 troops on each other's territory. As fellow members of the UN Security Council with many interests and problems in common, the UK and France have a long history of bilateral collaboration. This has occurred both at government level and in industrial programmes like the SEPECAT Jaguar whilst corporate mergers have seen Thales and MBDA emerge as major defence companies spanning both countries. The 2008 financial crisis led to renewed pressure on military budgets and the "austerity alliance" enshrined in the Lancaster House Treaties of 2010. These promised close integration in both procurement and at an operational level, reaching into the most sensitive areas such as nuclear warheads.

== Topical subjects ==
=== French Air and Space Force ===
The Tricolore cockade of the French Air and Space Force was the first roundel used on combat aircraft.

The Armée de l'Air became one of the first professional air forces in the world when it was founded in 1909. The French took active interest in developing their air force and had the first fighter pilots of World War I. During the interwar years, however, particularly in the 1930s, the technical quality fell when compared with the Luftwaffe, which crushed both the French and British air forces during the Battle of France. In the post–World War II era, the French made a concerted and successful effort to develop a homegrown aircraft industry. Dassault Aviation led the way forward with their unique and effective delta-wing designs, which formed the basis for the famous Mirage series of jet fighters. The Mirage repeatedly demonstrated its deadly abilities in the Six-Day War and the Gulf War, becoming one of the most popular and well-sold aircraft in the history of military aviation along the way. Currently, the French are awaiting the A400M military transport aircraft, which is still in developmental stages, and the integration of the new Rafale multi-role jet fighter, whose first squadron of 20 aircraft became operational in 2006 at Saint-Dizier. In 2020 it was renamed the Armée de l'Air et de l'Espace, or French Air and Space Force.

=== French Navy ===
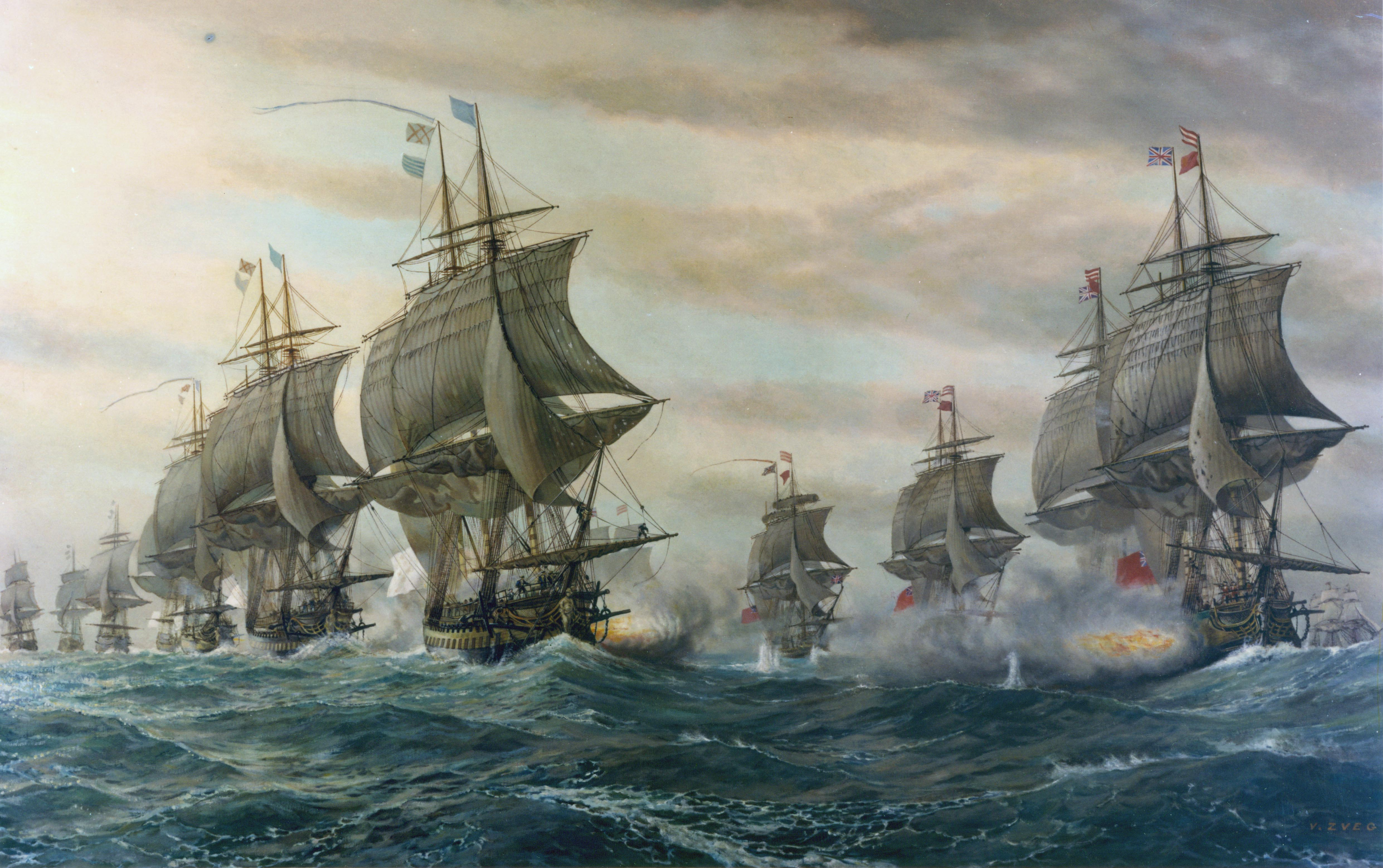
The French ships engage the British navy (right) in the Battle of Chesapeake.

Medieval fleets, in France as elsewhere, were almost entirely composed of merchant ships enlisted into naval service in time of war, but the early beginnings of the French naval history goes back to that era. The first battle of the French Navy was the battle of Arnemuiden (23 September 1338), where it defeated the English Navy. The battle of Arnemuiden was also the first naval battle using artillery. It was later defeated by an Anglo-Flemish fleet at the Battle of Sluys and, with Castilian help, managed to beat the English at La Rochelle—both battles playing a crucial role in the development of the Hundred Years War. However, the navy did not become a consistent instrument of national power until the 17th century with Louis XIV. Under the tutelage of the "Sun King," the French Navy was well financed and equipped, managing to resoundingly defeat a combined Spanish-Dutch fleet at the Battle of Palermo in 1676 during the Franco-Dutch War, although, along with the English navy, it suffered several strategic reversals against the Dutch, who were led by the brilliant Michiel de Ruyter. It scored several early victories in the Nine Years War against the Royal Navy and the Dutch Navy. Financial difficulties, however, allowed the English and the Dutch to regain the initiative at sea.

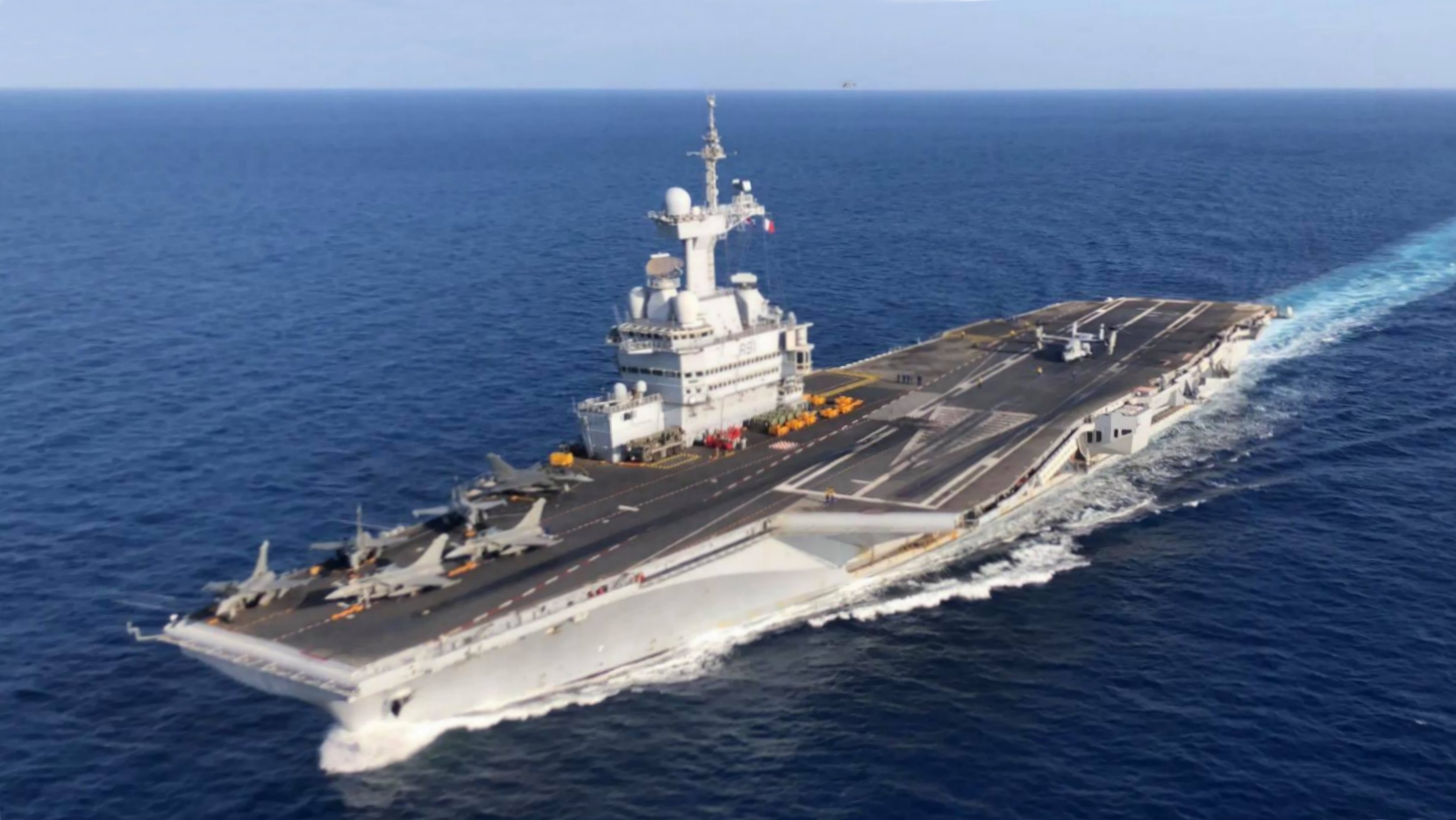
The Charles de Gaulle, the first nuclear-powered aircraft carrier in Europe

A perennial problem for the French Navy was the strategic priorities of France, which were first and foremost tied to its European ambitions. This reality meant that the army was often treated better than the navy, and as a result, the latter suffered in training and operational performance. The 18th century saw the beginning of the Royal Navy's domination, which managed to inflict a number of significant defeats on the French. However, in a very impressive effort, a French fleet under de Grasse managed to defeat a British fleet at the Battle of the Chesapeake in 1781, ensuring that the Franco-American ground forces would win the ongoing Siege of Yorktown. Beyond that, and Suffren's impressive campaigns against the British in India, there was not much more good news. The French Revolution all but crippled the French Navy, and efforts to make it into a powerful force under Napoleon were dashed at the Battle of Trafalgar in 1805, where the British all but annihilated a combined Franco-Spanish fleet. The disaster guaranteed British naval domination until the end of the Napoleonic wars.

Later in the 19th century, the navy recovered and became the second finest in the world after the Royal Navy. It conducted a successful blockade of Mexico in the Pastry War of 1838 and obliterated the Chinese navy at the Battle of Foochow in 1884. It also served as an effective link between the growing parts of the French empire. The navy performed well during World War I, in which it mainly protected the naval lanes in the Mediterranean Sea. At the onset of the war, the French had a large fleet in the Mediterranean whive no less than seven battleship & six heavy cruiser . French defeats in the early stages of World War II, however, forced the British to attack the French fleet moored at Mers-el-Kebir in order to prevent the threat she fall to the Germans, the remaining of French fleet scuttled herself at Toulon for prevent the 7th Panzer Division to capture the fleet, two years later .

Currently, French naval doctrine calls for two aircraft carriers, but the French currently only have one, the Charles de Gaulle, due to restructuring. The navy is in the midst of some technological and procurement changes; newer submarines are under construction and Rafale aircraft (the naval version) are currently replacing older aircraft.

=== Foreign Legion ===
The Foreign Legion was created in 1831 by French king Louis-Philippe to allow the incorporation of foreign nationals into the French Army. Over the past century and a half, it has gone on to become one of the most recognizable and lauded military units in the world. The Legion had a very difficult start; there were few non-commissioned officers, many of the soldiers could not speak French, and pay was often irregular. The Legion was soon transferred to fight in Algeria, performing moderately successfully given its condition. On August 17, 1835, the commander of the Legion, Colonel Joseph Bernelle, decided to amalgamate all the battalions so that no nationality was exclusively confined to a particular battalion; this helped ensure that the Legion did not fragment into factions.

Following participation in Africa and in the Carlist Wars in Spain, the Legion fought in the Crimean War and the Franco-Austrian War, where they performed heroically at the Battle of Magenta, before earning even more glory during the French intervention in Mexico. On April 30, 1863, a company of 65 legionnaires was ambushed by 2,000 Mexican troops at the Hacienda Camarón; in the resulting Battle of Camarón, the legionnaires resisted bravely for several hours and inflicted 300–500 casualties on the Mexicans while 62 of them died and three were captured. One of the Mexican commanders, impressed by the memorable intransigence he had just witnessed, characterized the Legion in a way they've been known ever since, "These are not men, but devils!"

In World War I, the Legion demonstrated that it was a highly capable unit in modern warfare. It suffered 11,000 casualties in the Western Front while conducting brilliant defenses and spirited counter-attacks. Following the debacle in the Battle of France in 1940, the Legion was split between those who supported the Vichy government and those who joined the Free French under de Gaulle. At the Battle of Bir Hakeim in 1942, the Free French 13th Legion Demi-Brigade doggedly defended its positions against a combined Italian-German offensive and seriously delayed Rommel's attacks towards Tobruk. The Legion eventually returned to Europe and fought until the end of the Second World War in 1945. It later fought in the First Indochina War against the Viet Minh. At the climactic Battle of Dien Bien Phu in 1954, French forces, many of them legionnaires, were completely surrounded by a large Vietnamese army and were defeated after two months of tenacious fighting. French withdrawal from Algeria led to the collapse of the French colonial empire. The legionnaires were mostly used in colonial interventions, so the destruction of the empire prompted questions about their status. Ultimately, the Legion was allowed to exist and participated as a rapid reaction force in many places throughout Africa and around the world.

== See also ==
- History of French foreign relations
- Military of France
- Military history of France during World War II
- Norman Conquest of England
- Marshals of France
- List of notable French military leaders
- List of French wars and battles
- Deployments of the French military
- List of battles involving France (disambiguation)
- Social background of officers and other ranks in the French Army, 1750–1815
- French and Indian Wars
- French artillery during World War I

== Works cited ==
- Aloni, Shlomo. Israeli Mirage and Nesher Aces. Oxford: Osprey Publishing, 2004. ISBN 1-84176-653-4
- Black, Jeremy. Cambridge illustrated atlas of warfare: Renaissance to revolution, 1492–1792. Cambridge: Cambridge University Press, 1996. ISBN 0-521-47033-1
- Blanning, T.C.W. The French Revolutionary Wars. London: Hodder Headline Group, 1996. ISBN 0-340-56911-5
- Boyce, Robert. French Foreign and Defence Policy, 1918–1940. Oxford: CRC Press, 1998. ISBN 0-203-97922-2
- Bradbury, Jim. The Routledge companion to medieval warfare. New York: Routledge, 2004. ISBN 0-415-22126-9
- Bradford, Alfred and Pamela. With arrow, sword, and spear: a history of warfare in the ancient world. Westport: Greenwood Publishing Group, 2001. ISBN 0-275-95259-2
- Brooks, Richard (editor). Atlas of World Military History. London: HarperCollins, 2000. ISBN 0-7607-2025-8
- Chandler, David G. The Campaigns of Napoleon. New York: Simon & Schuster, 1995. ISBN 0-02-523660-1
- Chilton, Patricia and Howorth, Jolyon Howorth. Defence and dissent in contemporary France Oxford: Taylor & Francis, 1984. ISBN 0-7099-1280-3
- Dupuy, Trevor N., Harper Encyclopedia of Military History. New York: HarperCollins, 1993. ISBN 0-06-270056-1
- Elting, John R. Swords Around a Throne: Napoleon's Grande Armée. New York: Da Capo Press Inc., 1988. ISBN 0-306-80757-2
- Eltis, David. The military revolution in sixteenth-century Europe. New York: I. B. Tauris, 1998. ISBN 1-86064-352-3
- Farwell, Byron. The encyclopedia of nineteenth-century land warfare. New York: W. W. Norton & Company, 2001. ISBN 0-393-04770-9
- Fisher, Todd & Fremont-Barnes, Gregory. The Napoleonic Wars: The Rise and Fall of an Empire. Oxford: Osprey Publishing Ltd., 2004. ISBN 1-84176-831-6
- de la Gorce, Paul Marie. The French Army: A Military-Political History. New York: George Braziller, Inc., 1963.
- Hauss, Charles. Politics in France. Washington, DC: CQ Press, 2007. ISBN 1-56802-670-6
- Jordan, David. The History of the French Foreign Legion. Spellmount Limited, 2005. ISBN 1-86227-295-6
- Jotischky, Andrew. Crusading and the Crusader States. Pearson Education Limited, 2004. ISBN 0-582-41851-8
- Karpat, Kemal. The Ottoman state and its place in world history. Leiden: Brill, 1974. ISBN 90-04-03945-7
- Kay, Sean. NATO and the future of European security. Lanham: Rowman & Littlefield, 1998. ISBN 0-8476-9001-6
- Keegan, John. The Second World War. New York: Penguin Group, 1989. ISBN 0-670-82359-7
- Kottak, Conrad. Cultural Anthropology. Columbus: McGraw-Hill Higher Education, 2005. ISBN 0-07-295250-4
- Kurtz, Lester and Turpin, Jennifer. Encyclopedia of violence, peace and conflict, Volume 2. New York: Academic Press, 1999. ISBN 0-12-227010-X
- Lyons, Martyn. Napoleon Bonaparte and the Legacy of the French Revolution. New York: St. Martin's Press, Inc., 1994. ISBN 0-312-12123-7
- Lynn, John A. Giant of the Grand Siècle: The French Army, 1610–1715. New York: Cambridge University Press, 1997. ISBN 0-521-57273-8
- Lynn, John A. The Wars of Louis XIV. London: Longman, 1999. ISBN 0-582-05629-2
- Ostwald, Jamel. Vauban under siege. Leiden: Brill, 2007. ISBN 90-04-15489-2
- Paret, Peter. Clausewitz and the State. Princeton: Princeton University Press, 2007. ISBN 0-691-13130-9
- Parker, Geoffrey. The Cambridge history of warfare. Cambridge: Cambridge University Press, 2005. ISBN 0-521-85359-1
- Roberts, J.M. History of the World. New York: Penguin Group, 1992. ISBN 0-19-521043-3
- Roosen, William. The age of Louis XIV: the rise of modern diplomacy. Edison: Transaction Publishers, 1976. ISBN 0-87073-581-0
- Spielvogel, Jackson. Western Civilization: Since 1500. Florence: Cengage Learning, 2008. ISBN 0-495-50287-1
- Strachan, Hew. The Oxford Illustrated History of the First World War. Oxford: Oxford University Press, 1998. ISBN 0-19-289325-4
- Thompson, William. Great power rivalries. Columbia: University of South Carolina Press, 1999. ISBN 1-57003-279-3
- Tuchman W., Barbara. The Guns of August. New York: Random House, 1962. ISBN 0-345-38623-X
- Weigley, Russell. The age of battles: the quest for decisive warfare from Breitenfeld to Waterloo. Bloomington: Indiana University Press, 2004. ISBN 0-253-21707-5
- Willis, F. Roy. France, Germany, and the New Europe, 1945–1967. Palo Alto: Stanford University Press, 1968. ISBN 0-8047-0241-1
- Wood, James. The King's Army. Cambridge: Cambridge University Press, 2002. ISBN 0-521-52513-6
