= The Death of the Prince Imperial =

Painting by Paul Jamin

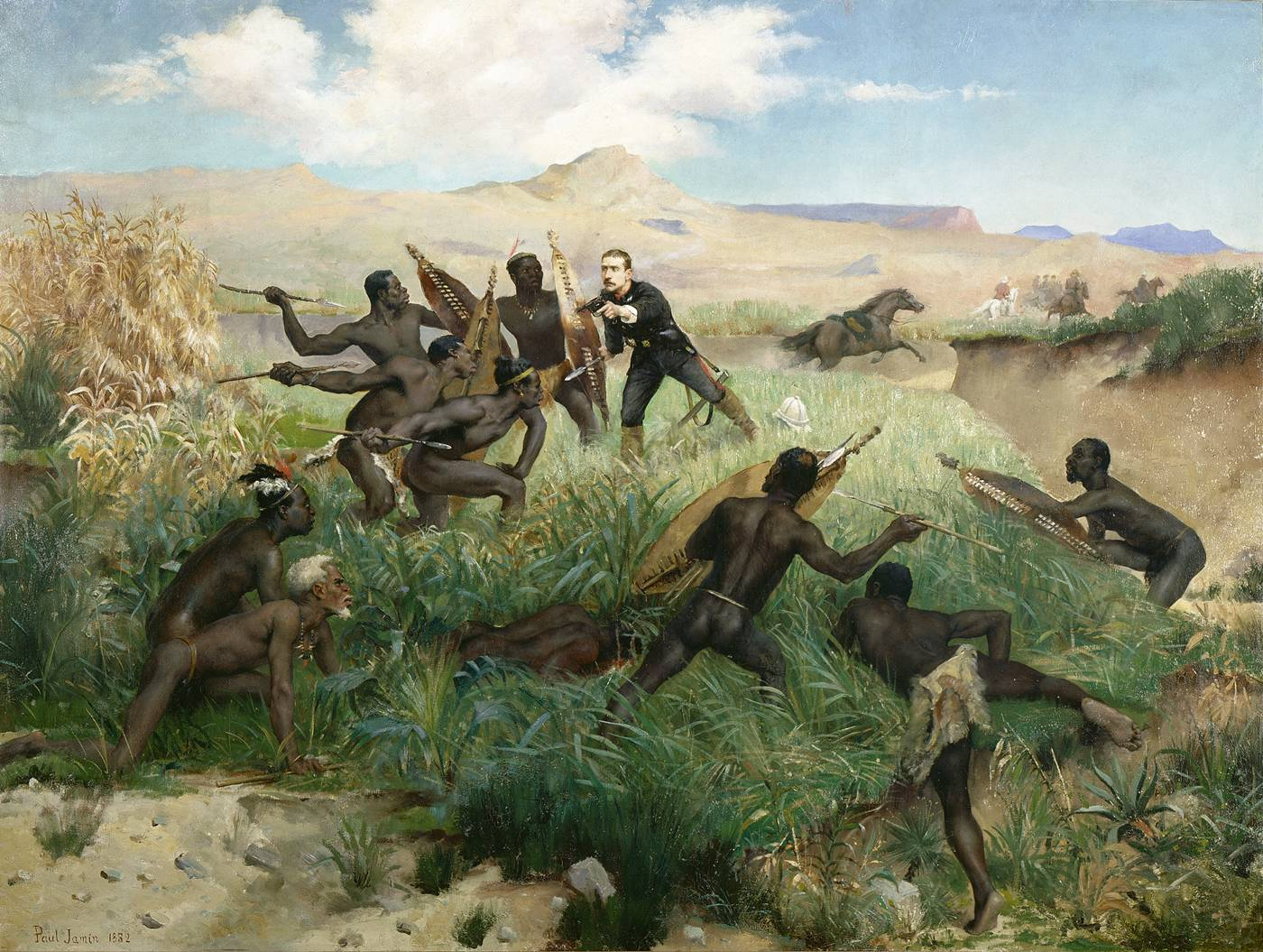
- Artist: Paul Jamin
- Year: 1882
- Type: Oil on canvas, history painting
- Dimensions: 162 cm × 118 cm (64 in × 46 in)
- Location: Château de Compiègne; Compiègne

The Death of the Prince Imperial (French: Mort du prince impérial) is an 1882 history painting by the French artist Paul Jamin depicting a scene from the Anglo-Zulu War. It portrays the death at the hands of Zulu fighters on 1 June 1879 of Louis-Napoléon, Prince Imperial. Serving with the British Army, the twenty three year old Lieutenant was isolated and killed while on a reconnaissance.

He was the only son and heir of the deposed French Emperor Napoleon III who had gone into exile in England in 1870. Since the Emperor's death in 1873 the Prince Imperial had been considered by Bonapartists to be Napoleon IV and his death was a devastating blow to the future hopes of the Bonaparte dynasty. Today the painting is in the collection of the Château de Compiègne, having been acquired in 1911.

== Bibliography ==
- Honour, Hugh. Slaves and Liberators. Harvard University Press, 1989.
- Knight, Ian. Companion to the Anglo-Zulu War. Pen and Sword, 2020.
- Parker, Shalon Detrice . A Tradition Gone Awry: The Salon Nude in Fin-de-siècle France. University of California, Berkeley, 2003.
