= Brennus and His Share of the Spoils =

Painting by Paul Jamin

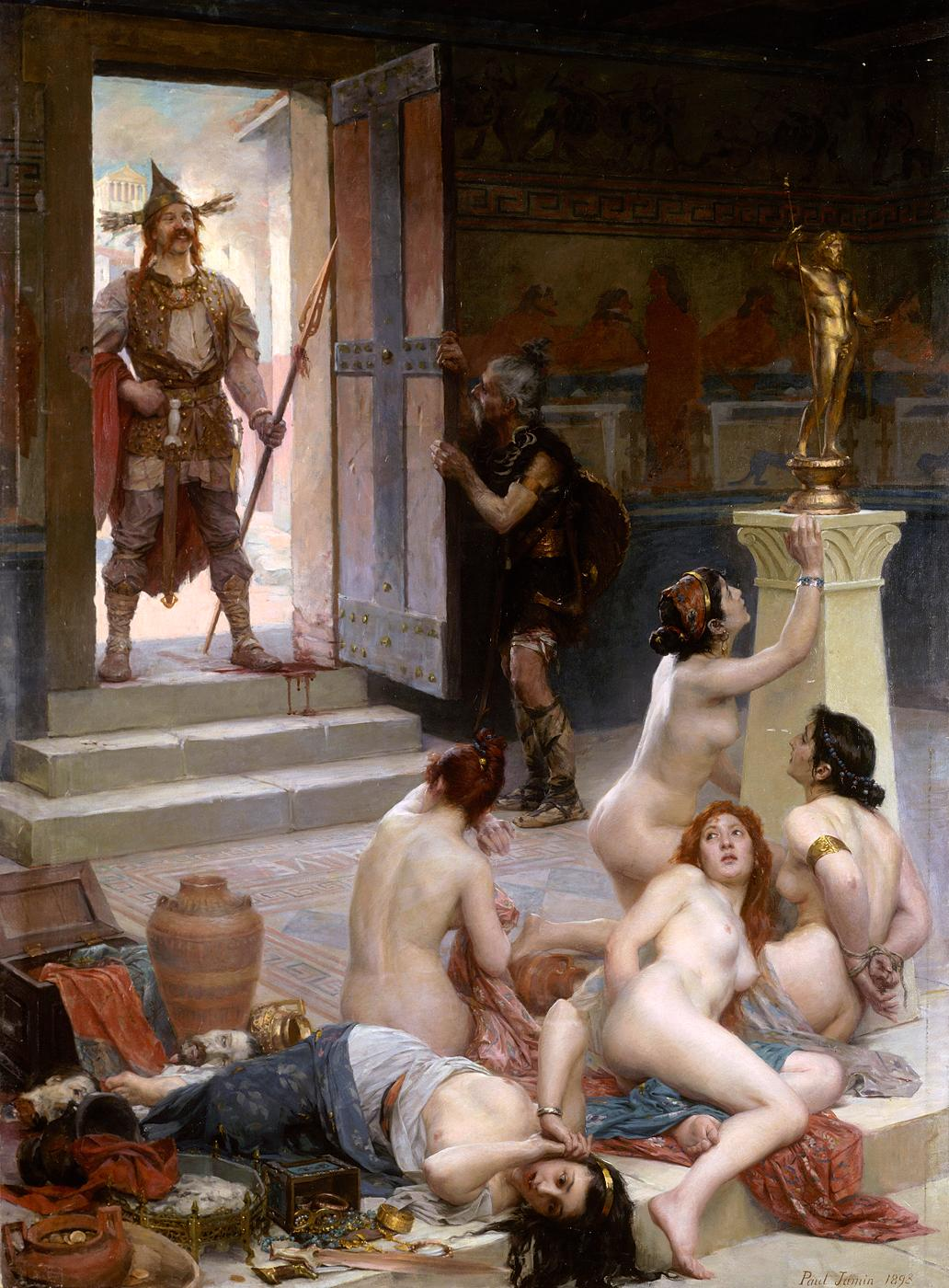
- Artist: Paul Jamin
- Year: 1893
- Type: Oil on canvas, history painting
- Dimensions: 162 cm × 118 cm (64 in × 46 in)
- Location: Private collection

Brennus and His Share of the Spoils (French: Le Brenn et sa part de butin) is an 1893 history painting by the French artist Paul Jamin. It depicts a scene from the Sack of Rome in 390 BC by Gaulish forces led by Brennus. Having defeated the Roman army, Brennus now prepares to seize his share of the city's plunder including captive women (models for such unknown). Some of the women are bound. Nearby are jewels, fine fabrics, chests of gold and the severed heads of the defeated foes. Painted in the Academic Style, it features an image of French triumph regarded as Revanchist in the context of the nation's defeat in the Franco-Prussian War twenty years earlier by celebrating an ancient victory.

== Bibliography ==
- Kneale, Matthew. Rome: A History in Seven Sackings. Simon and Schuster, 2019.
- Parker, Shalon Detrice . A Tradition Gone Awry: The Salon Nude in Fin-de-siècle France. University of California, Berkeley, 2003.
- Thomson, Richard. The Troubled Republic: Visual Culture and Social Debate in France, 1889-1900. Yale University Press, 2004.
- Vaughn, Bill. Hawthorn: The Tree That Has Nourished, Healed, and Inspired Through the Ages. Yale University Press, 2015.
