= Paul Jamin =

French painter (1853–1903)

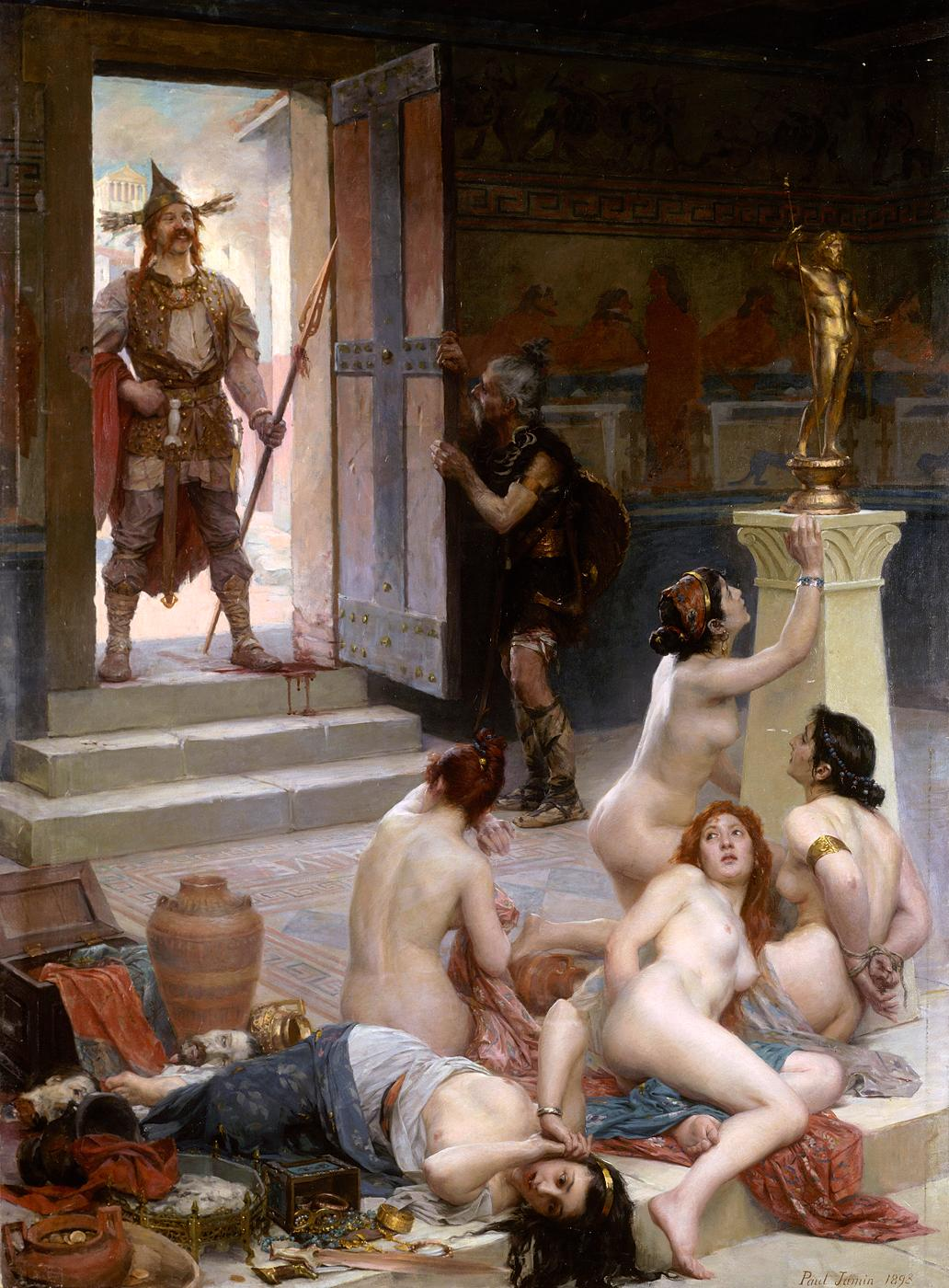
Brennus and His Share of the Spoils painting by Paul Jamin (1893), Musée des beaux-arts de La Rochelle.

Paul Joseph Jamin (9 February 1853 – 10 July 1903) was a French painter of the Academic Classicism school.

== Life and career ==
Jamin was born in Paris in 1853. He was the son of Jules Jamin, physicist and permanent secretary of the French Academy of Sciences. He married Augustine Marie Caroline Bastien in 1882, with whom he had four children.

He was a student of Gustave Boulanger.

His paintings were shown frequently at the Salon throughout the last quarter of the nineteenth century. In 1882 he produced The Death of the Prince Imperial, a scene depicting the death of the Bonapartist claimant Louis-Napoléon, Prince Imperial during the recent Anglo-Zulu War. One of his best-known paintings is Brennus and His Share of the Spoils (1893), which depicts the Gaulish chieftain Brennus viewing his captives after the looting of Rome.

Jamin died in Paris on 10 July 1903.

== Gallery ==
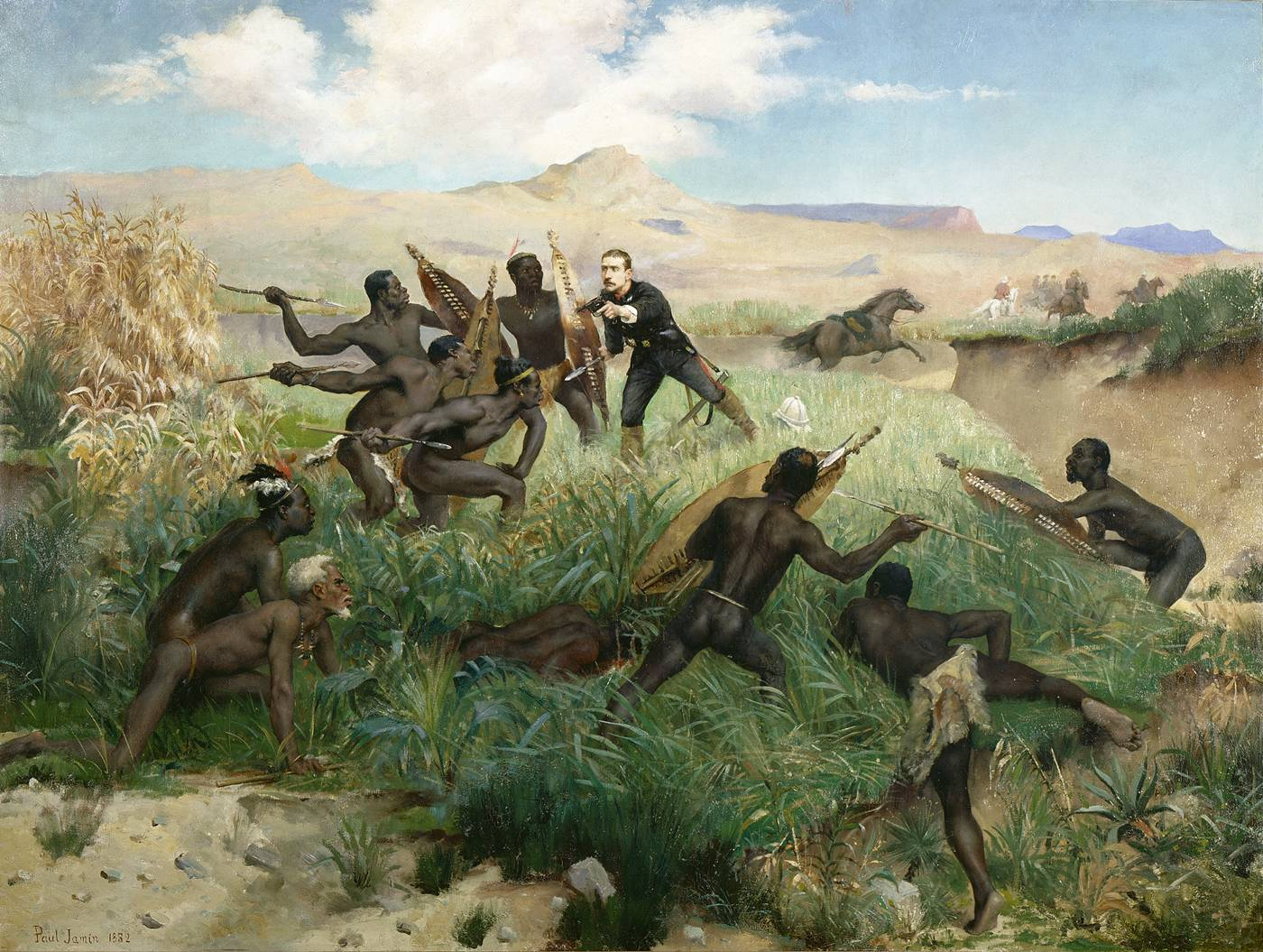
The Death of the Prince Imperial, 1882

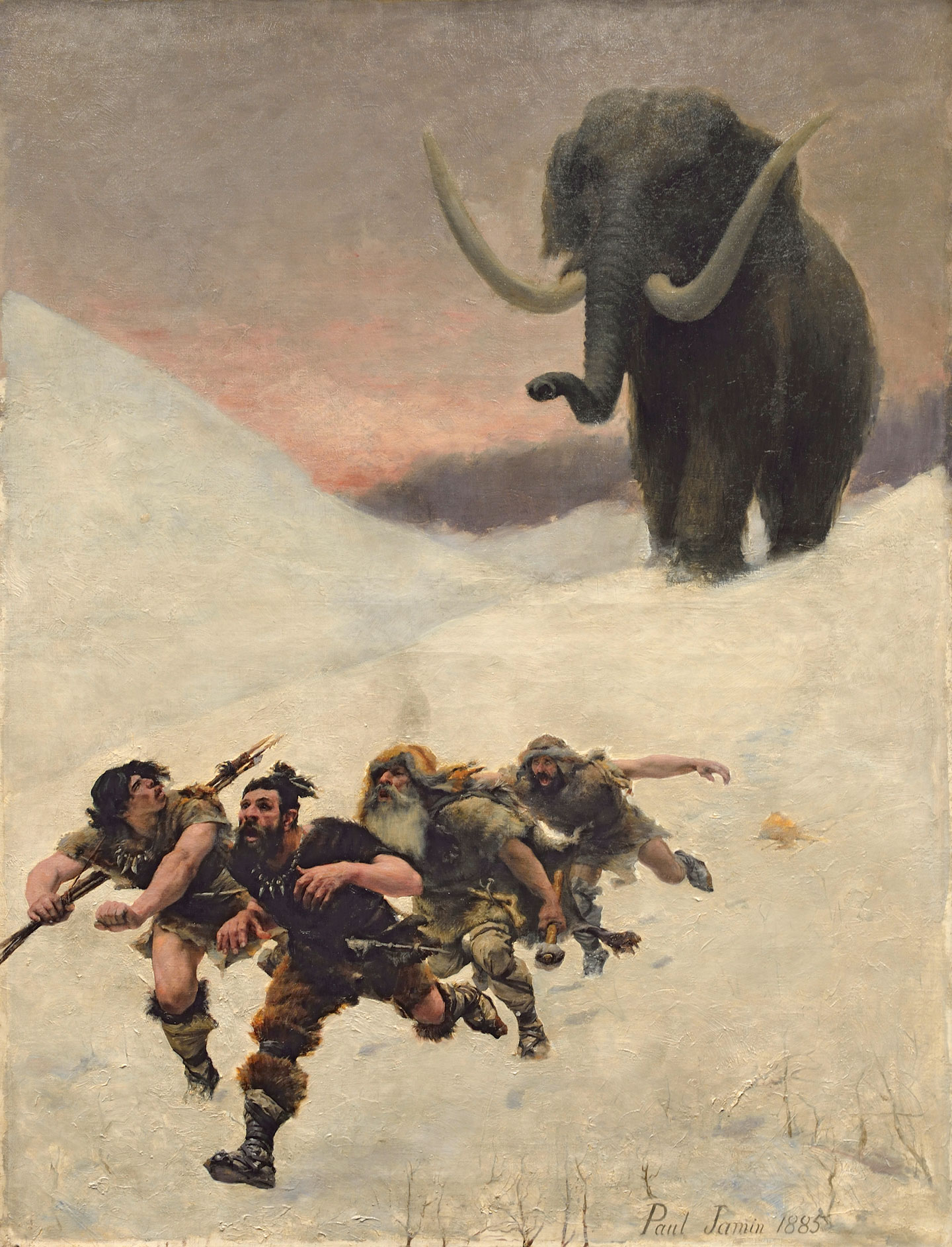
The Flight from the Mammoth, 1885

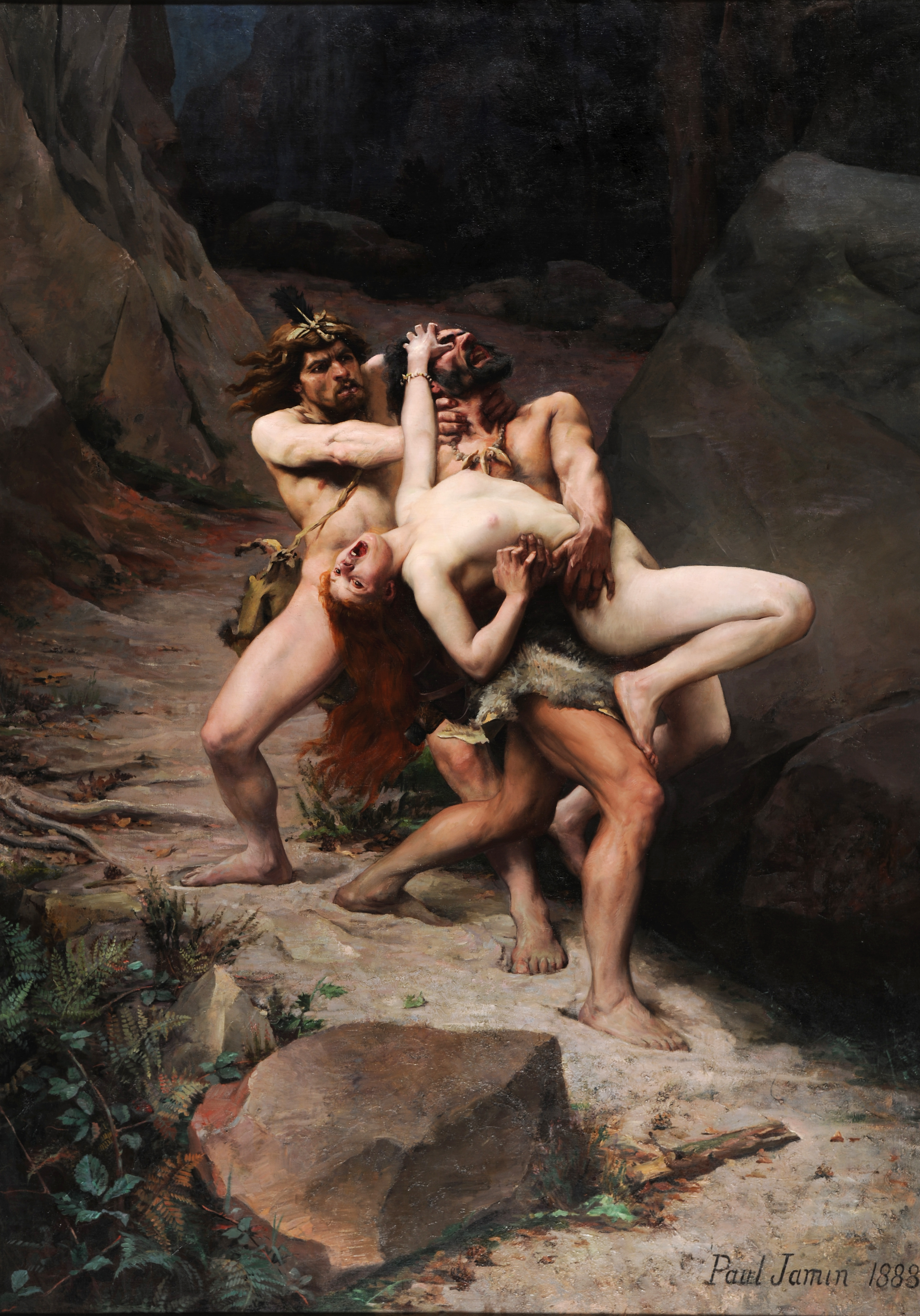
Stone Age Abduction, 1888
