= Brennus (leader of the Senones) =

4th-century BC Gaulish chieftain of the Senones

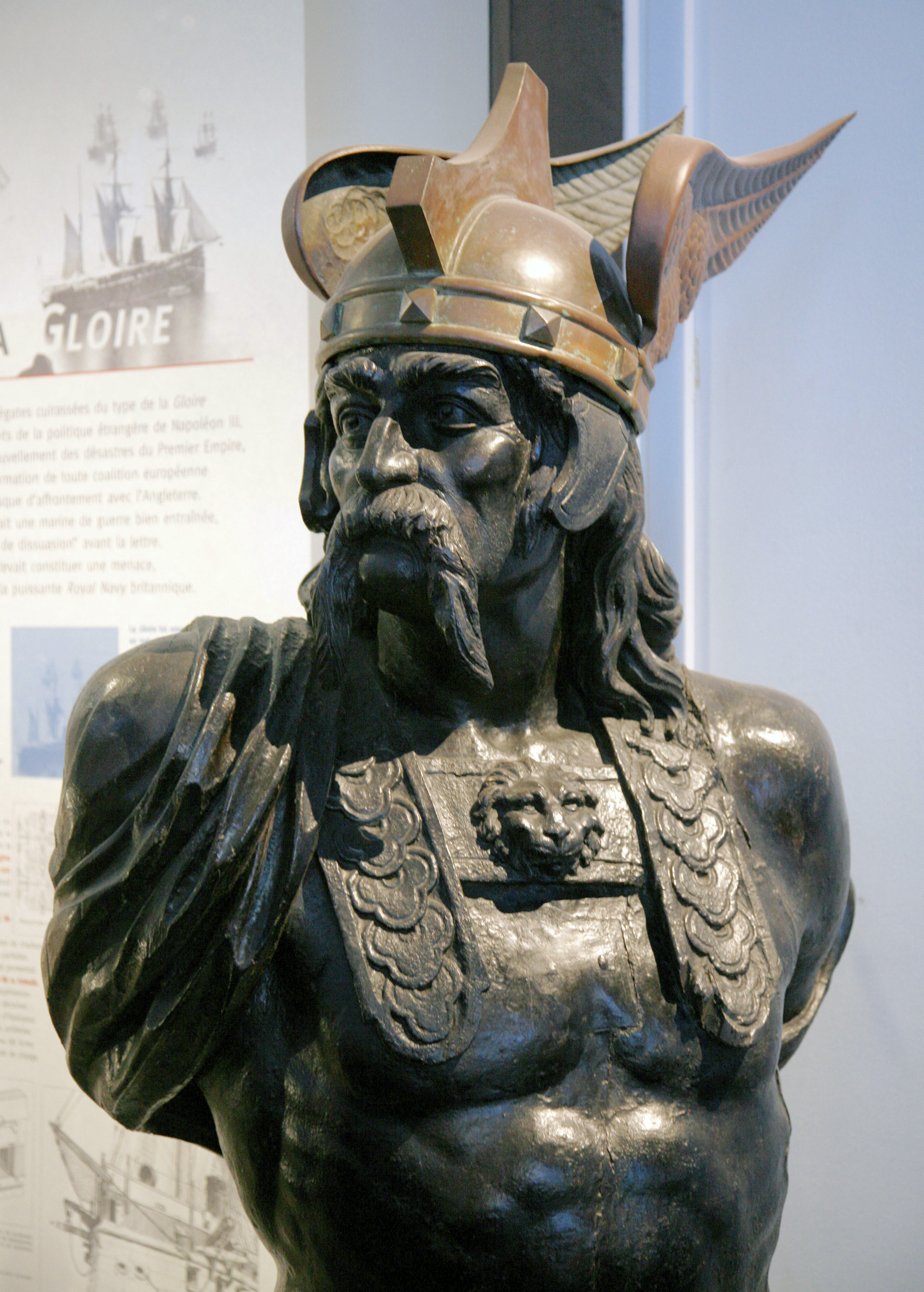
- Brennus depicted on the figurehead of the French battleship Brennus

Chieftain of the Senones
- Reign: fl. 4th century BCE
- Born: 5th century BCE; Gaul
- Died: Death date and location unknown
Names
- Brennus, Brennos
- Religion: Celtic paganism
- Occupation: Chieftain, war leader

Brennus (or Brennos) was a Gallic chieftain of the Senones. In c. 387 BC (Note: The date of Brennus' sacking of Rome may have been 390 BC.) he defeated the Romans at the Battle of the Allia. Later that year, he led an army of Cisalpine Gauls in their attack on Rome and captured most of the city, holding it for several months. Brennus's sack of Rome was the only time in 800 years the city was occupied by a non-Roman army before the fall of the city to the Germanic Visigoths in 410 AD.

== Background ==
The Senones were a Gaulish tribe originating from the part of France at present known as Seine-et-Marne, Loiret, and Yonne, who had expanded to occupy northern Italy. At around 400 BC, a branch of the Senones made their way over the Alps and, having driven out the Umbri, settled on the east coast of Italy from Ariminum to Ancona, in the so-called Ager Gallicus, and founded Sena Gallica (current Senigallia), which became their capital. A Senonian settlement was established at Sena Gallica (modern Senigallia) in the 4th century BC.

In 391 BC they invaded Etruria and besieged Clusium. The Clusines appealed to Rome. Quintus Fabius Ambustus and his two brothers were sent to negotiate with the Gauls. They allegedly broke their oath of neutrality by participating in hostilities outside of Clusium. Livy and Plutarch say that the Senones marched to Rome to exact retribution for this. It is possible that the entire story of the events at Clusium is fiction, as Clusium had no real reason to appeal to Rome for help, and the Gauls needed no real provocation to sack Rome. The story, it is hypothesized, exists to provide an explanation for an otherwise unmotivated attack on Rome and to depict Rome as a bulwark of Italy against the Gauls. Alternately, it has been theorized that Brennus was working in concert with Dionysius I of Syracuse, who sought to control all of Sicily. Rome had strong allegiances with Messana, a small city state in north east Sicily, which Dionysius wanted to control. Rome's army being pinned down by Brennus's efforts would assist Dionysius's campaign.

== Sack of Rome ==
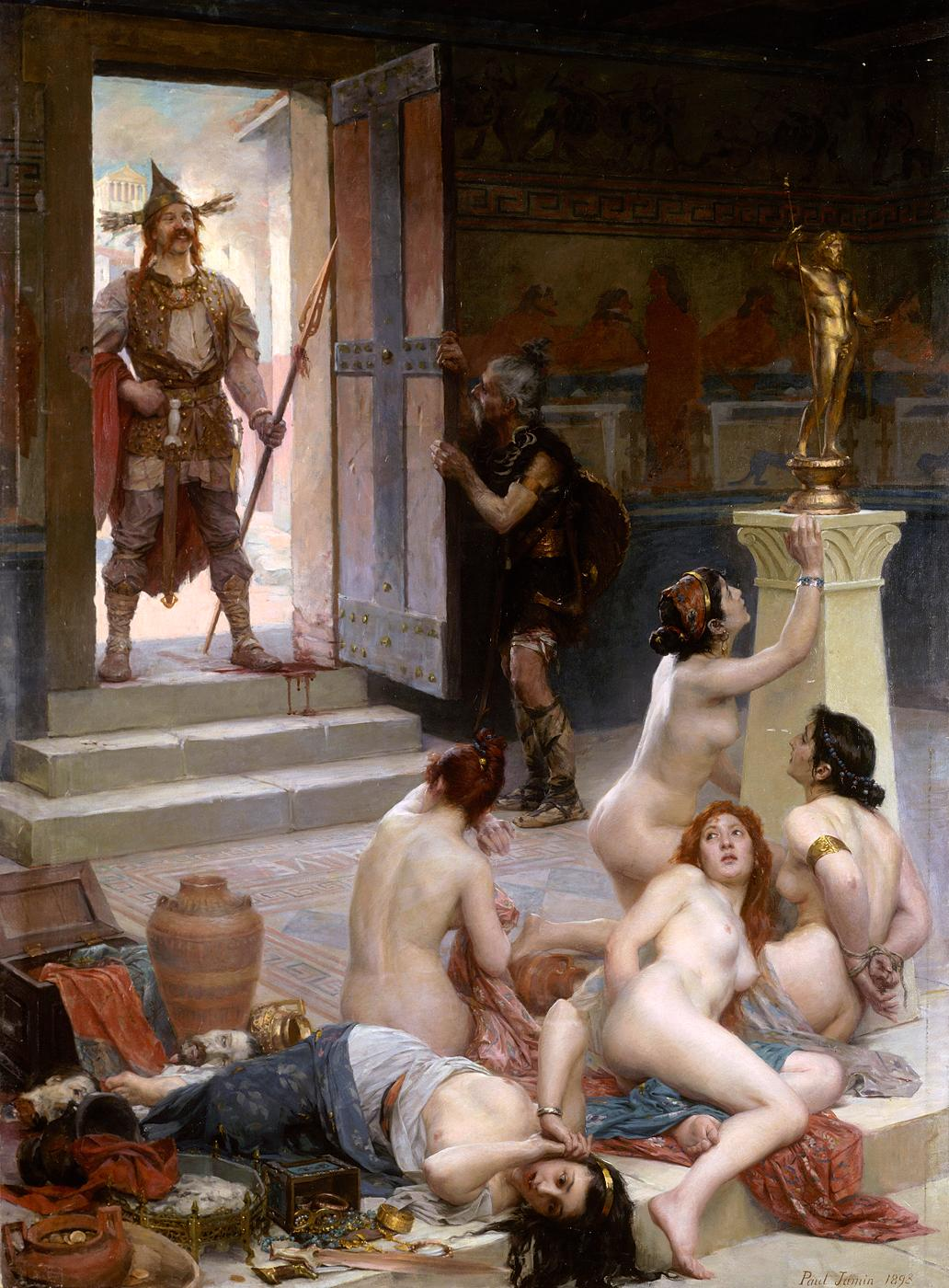
Brennus and His Share of the Spoils (Paul Jamin, 1893)

In the Battle of the Allia, Brennus defeated the Romans and entered the city. The Senones captured the entire city of Rome except for the Capitoline Hill, which was successfully held against them. According to legend, Marcus Manlius Capitolinus was alerted to the Gallic attack by the sacred geese of Juno. However, seeing their city devastated, the Romans attempted to buy their salvation from Brennus. The Romans agreed to pay one thousand pounds weight of gold. According to Livy, during a dispute over the weights used to measure the gold (the Gauls had brought their own, heavier-than-standard), Brennus threw his sword onto the scales and uttered the famous words "Vae victis!", which translates to "woe to the conquered!"

== Defeat ==
One version of the story states that the argument about the weights had so delayed matters that the exiled dictator Marcus Furius Camillus had extra time to muster an army, return to Rome and expel the Gauls, saving both the city and the treasury, and telling Brennus, "Non auro, sed ferro, recuperanda est patria", which translates to "not by gold, but by iron, is the nation to be recovered". According to Plutarch, following initial combat through Rome's streets, the Gauls were first ejected from the city then utterly annihilated in a regular engagement eight miles outside of town on the road to Gabii. Camillus was hailed by his troops as another Romulus, father of his country 'Pater Patriae' and second founder of Rome.

Livy recounts that the Senones besieging the Capitoline Hill were afflicted with an illness and thus were in a weakened state when they were forced to retreat. This is plausible as dysentery and other sanitation issues have incapacitated and killed large numbers of combat soldiers up until and including modern times.

Silius Italicus claims that Hannibal's Boii cavalrymen were led by a descendant of Brennus named Crixus, who fell in the Battle of Ticinus.

== Cultural depictions ==
- Geoffrey of Monmouth's Historia Regum Britanniae depicts Brennus under the name Brennius.
- An American song composed for 4 July 1818 begins "When Brennus led down his fierce conquering hosts", to be sung to the tune of "The Anacreontic Song".
- The academic painting Brennus and His Share of the Spoils (1893) by Paul Jamin shows Brennus viewing his share of spoils (predominantly naked captive women) after the looting of Rome.
- The ghost of Brennus appears to support the Britons fighting Julius Caesar in the Jacobean era play Fuimus Troes.
- Brennus is played by Gordon Mitchell in the 1963 film Brennus, Enemy of Rome.
- Brennus and the sack of Rome by the Senones feature in Steven Saylor's historical novel Roma (2007)
- Brennus is a playable leader of the "Celts" faction in the 2001 video game expansion Civilization III: Play the World.
