= Pierre Joseph Célestin François =

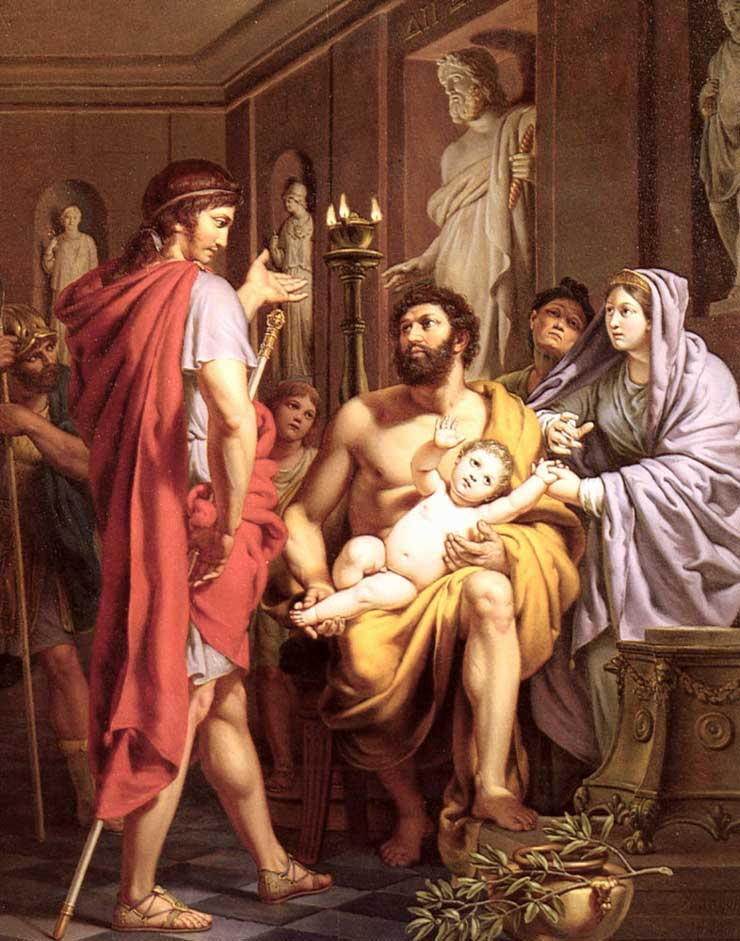
Themistocles with king Admetus

Pierre Joseph Célestin François or Joseph François (29 March 1759 - 13 March 1851) was a history, genre and miniature painter and etcher from the Southern Netherlands. He is known for his religious and mythological subjects and portraits executed in a Neoclassicist style.

== Life ==
François was born in Namur in 1759, the son of Charles Isidore François (1724-1788), manager of the tobacco factory of Viscount Desandrouin and Robertine Dumont (1734-1767). He grew up in Charleroi where he first studied drawing with Pierre Balthasar de Blocq. At age 11, François started his studies at the Academy of Fine Arts of Antwerp where his teachers included Andries Cornelis Lens, an Antwerp artist later working in Brussels in a Neoclassicist style, and Willem Jacob Herreyns, a late follower of Rubens. François remained at the academy for eight years.

François traveled in 1778 in France and then to Italy where he resided in Rome until 1781. During this period he traveled in Italy. François then left for Germany and stayed in Vienna for six months, then returned to Antwerp. Back in Rome in 1789 François remained in the city for three years. His patrons included Prince Lambertini. François finally returned and established himself in Brussels, where he became a professor at the Academy and the local Atheneum. On 25 February 1799, François married Marie-Françoise Leyniers, from the famous family of Brussels tapestry weavers. The couple had five children. François dedicated his time to teaching and decorative works with mythological subject matter. On some of these works he collaborated with his former teacher Andries Cornelis Lens who had moved to Brussels from Antwerp.

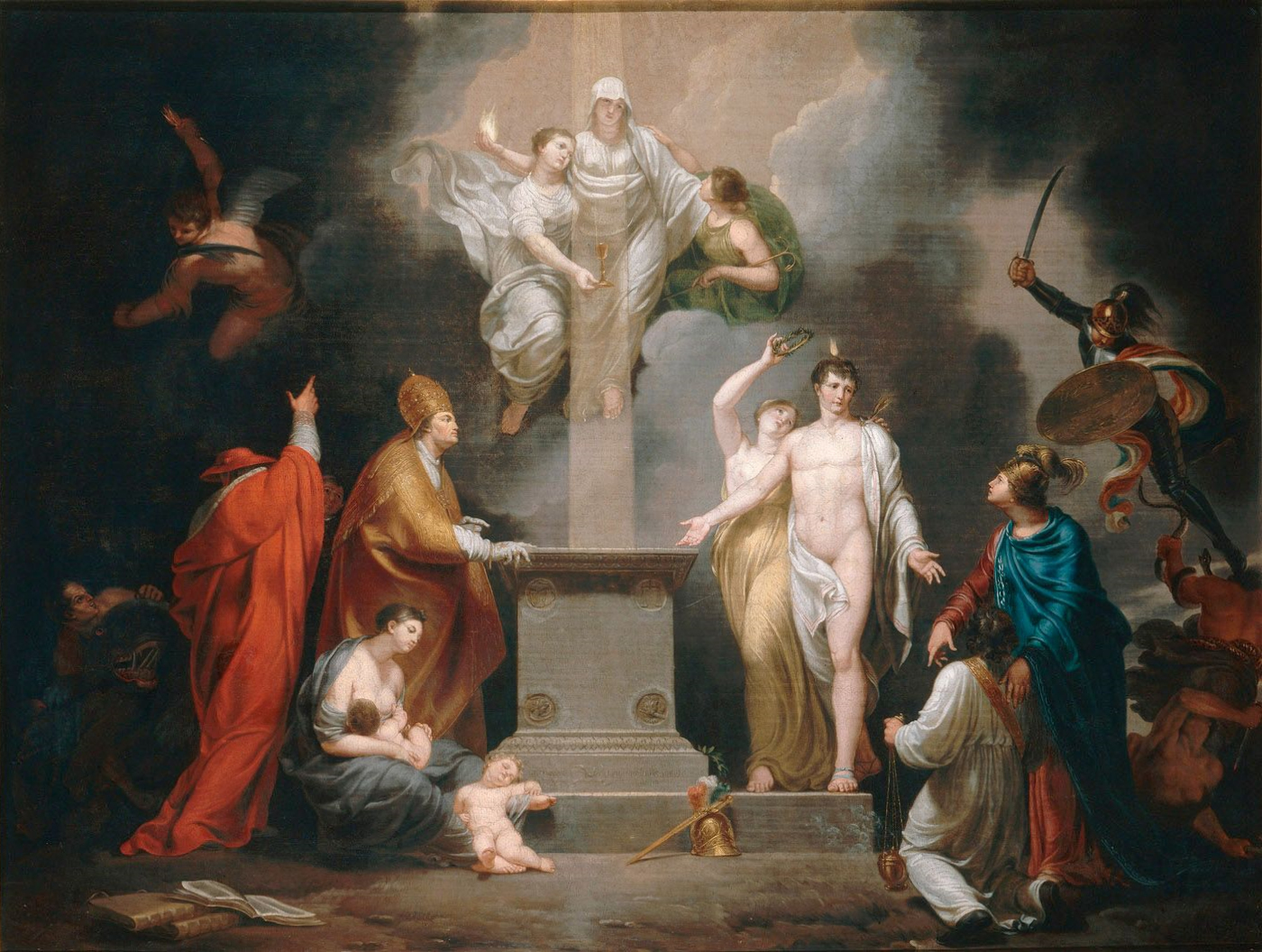
Allegory of the Concordat of 1801

François' pupils were very numerous, including Navez, Decaisne, Madou, and others. He also trained his son Ange François, who also worked in his workshop. He died in 1851 in Brussels.

== Work ==
Among his works are:

- Marius sitting on the Ruins of Carthage. (Brussels Gallery.)
- A Physician consulted by two old Women. (Haarlem Museum.)
- The Assumption. (Ghent Academy.)
