= Société royale belge des aquarellistes =

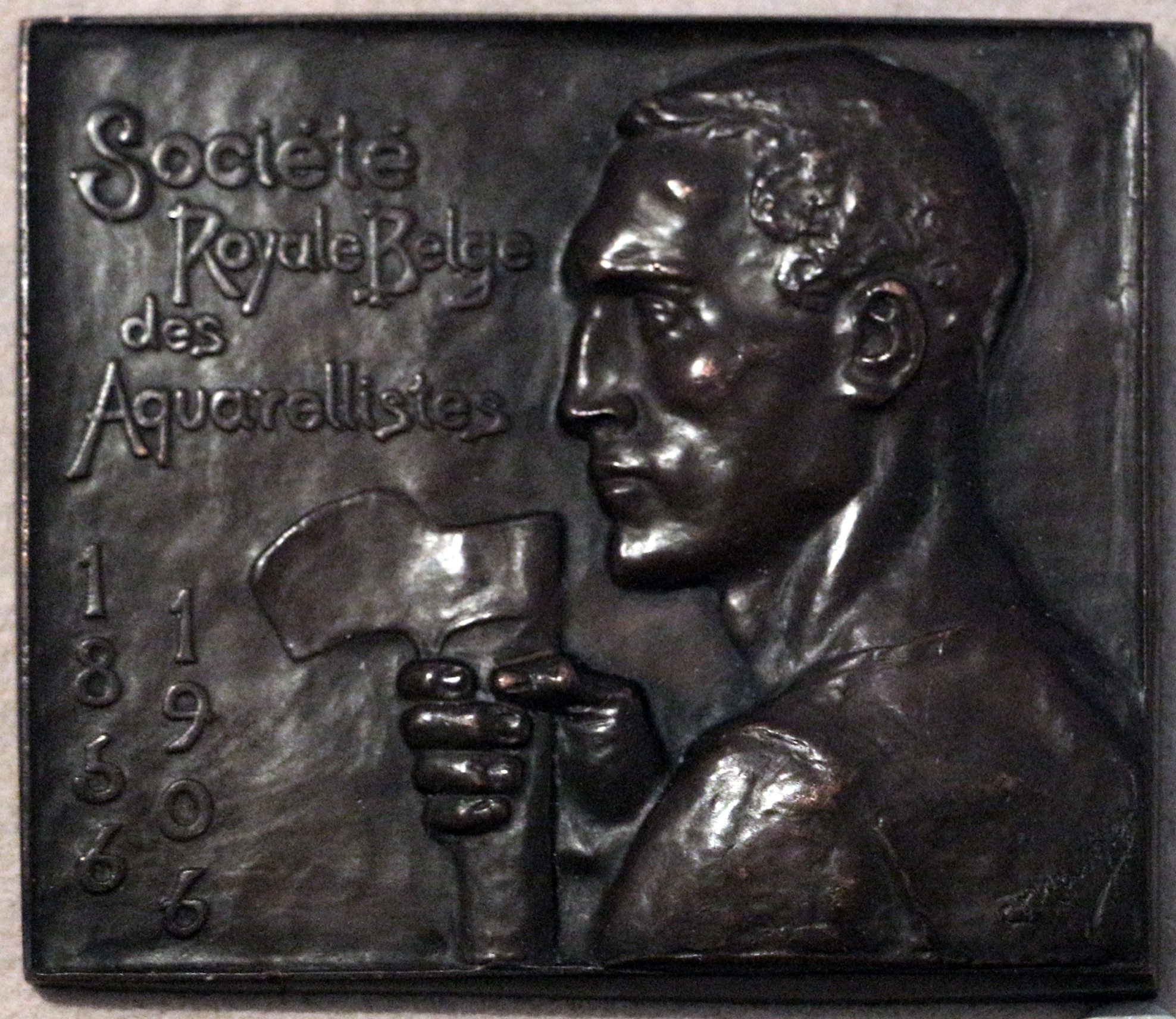
Société royale belge des aquarellistes by Constantin Meunier

The Société royale belge des aquarellistes (lit. 'Royal Belgian Society of Watercolour Artists') is an association of watercolourists founded in 1856 in Brussels under the chairmanship of Jean-Baptiste Madou.

== Creation of the society ==
On 11 June 1856, sixteen painters, inspired by the Royal Watercolour Society created in 1804, met in Brussels to found a similar society. Jean-Baptiste Madou was its first president. The number of its members was initially limited to twenty, but it is then increased to thirty and later to forty.

== Activities ==
The main purpose of the society was to hold annual exhibitions. These exhibitions were held at the Hôtel d'Assche (Place des Palais/Paleizenplein), the Hôtel Arconati-Visconti (Place Royale/Koningsplein), the Ducal Palace (currently the Academy Palace) and, from 1880, at the new Palace of Fine Arts (currently Royal Museums of Fine Arts of Belgium) then, from 1890, to the Museum of Modern Art. Famous watercolourists working abroad are invited to become honorary members. The Society invites one or more renowned non-Belgian watercolourists to each exhibition and grants them admission as honorary member.
