= Jozef Geirnaert =

Belgian painter

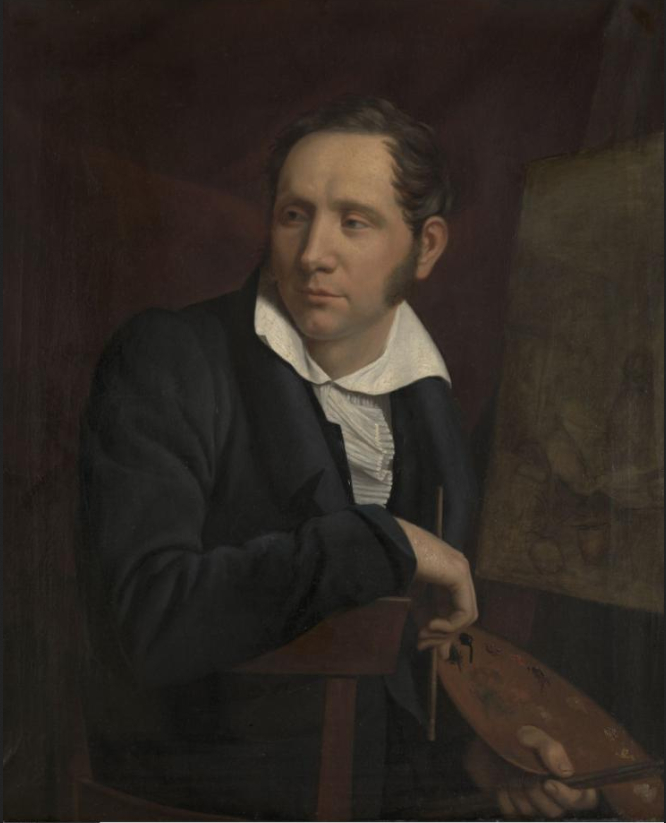
Self-portrait

Jozef Geirnaert, also known as Jozef Lodewijk Geirnaert, Théodore-Joseph-Louis Geirnaert and Joseph Louis Geirnaert (27 August 1790 in Eeklo – 20 March 1859 in Ghent), was a 19th-century painter and draughtsman from Belgium. He is known for his genre scenes, portraits as well as his historical, religious and mythological paintings. He was first influenced by the Neoclassical style of Jacques-Louis David and later by the version of Romanticism that was in vogue in Belgium from the 1830s.

== Life ==
Jozef Geirnaert was born in Eeklo. He studied at the Ghent Fine Arts Academy. After the school year 1813-1814, Geirnaert became a student of Willem Jacob Herreyns in Antwerp. After his studies in Antwerp, he returned to Ghent and worked there in the workshop of Joseph Paelinck.

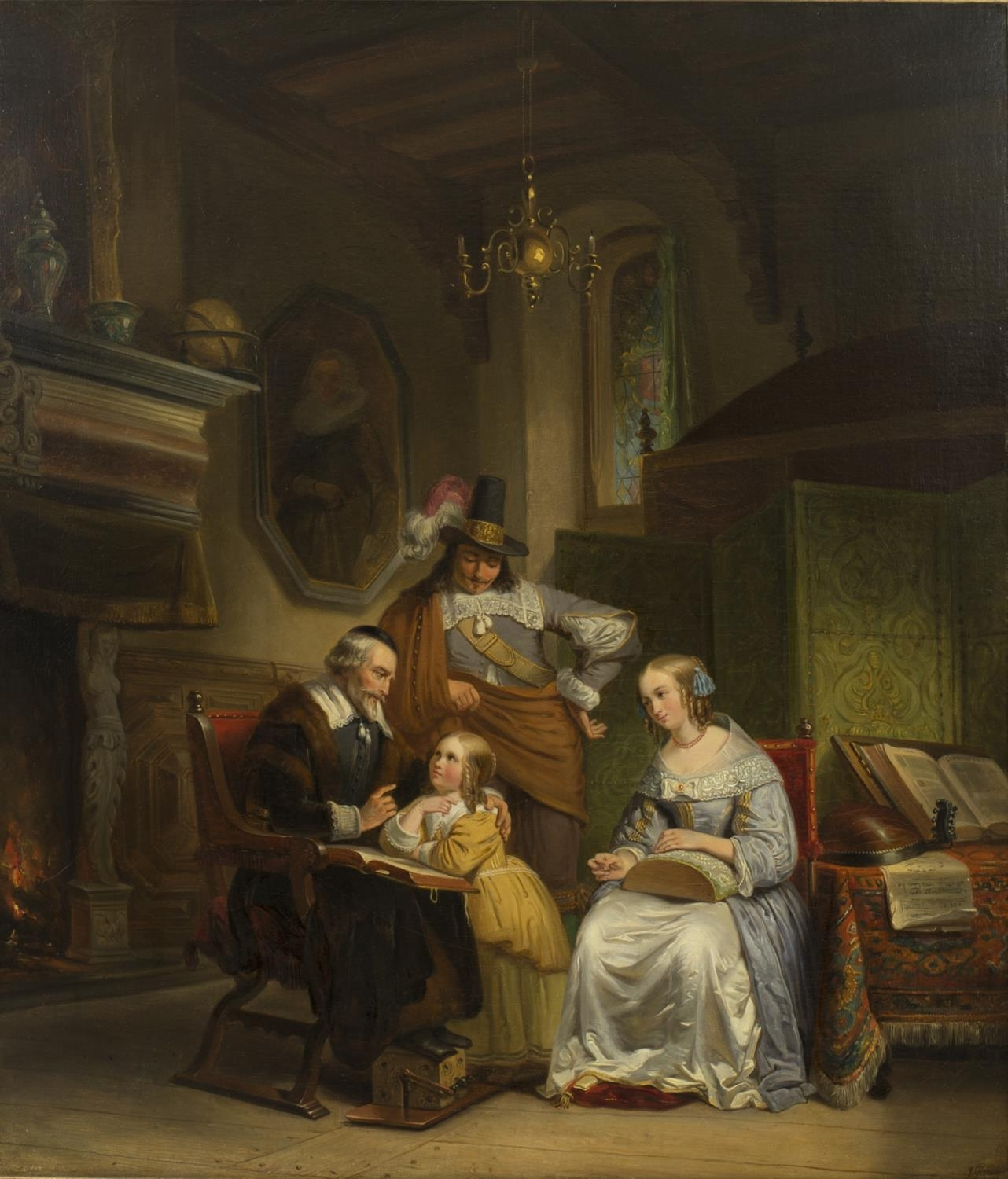
Interior Scene with Tutor Advising a Young Girl, Parents Looking on

Geirnaert started exhibiting religious and genre works in the prestigious Salons from 1817. He got to know the work of the Neoclassical French painter Jacques-Louis David, was then living and working as an exile in Brussels. Geirnaert submitted in 1818 a work for a competition organised by the fine arts academy of Brussels. His genre scene won him the First Prize. The same year’s submission to the Salon 1818 of Brussels entitled "Belgian Officer Introducing to his Family a Comrade in Arms who Ssaved his Life" was also distinguished by a prize. The young artist's success was celebrated in Eeklo and Ghent. There was a triumphal procession from Ghent to Eeklo. In 1820 Geirnaert obtained a medal at the Salon of Ghent for his portraits.

He was also in demand in Paris and obtained a gold medal at the Paris Salon of 1835 with his Wedding proposal. Geirnaert was for a while a painter who was very much in demand. However, artistic preferences were changing in Belgium with the advent of the historical Romantic school represented by figures of the Academy of Antwerp such as Gustaf Wappers. After the Belgian Revolution of 1830 when Belgium became independent from The Netherlands, the artist moved to The Hague as he was a supporter of Dutch rule over Belgium. In some of his paintings from that time he provided a clear commentary on the events: in "Election in Ghent in 1830" he showed a priest agitating on the street against the Dutch regime. After a self-imposed exile of six years, the artist returned to Belgium in 1836. He remained faithful to his themes but also occasionally carried out religious commissions including for the Saint Salvator church in Eeklo and the Saint Nicholas church in Ghent.

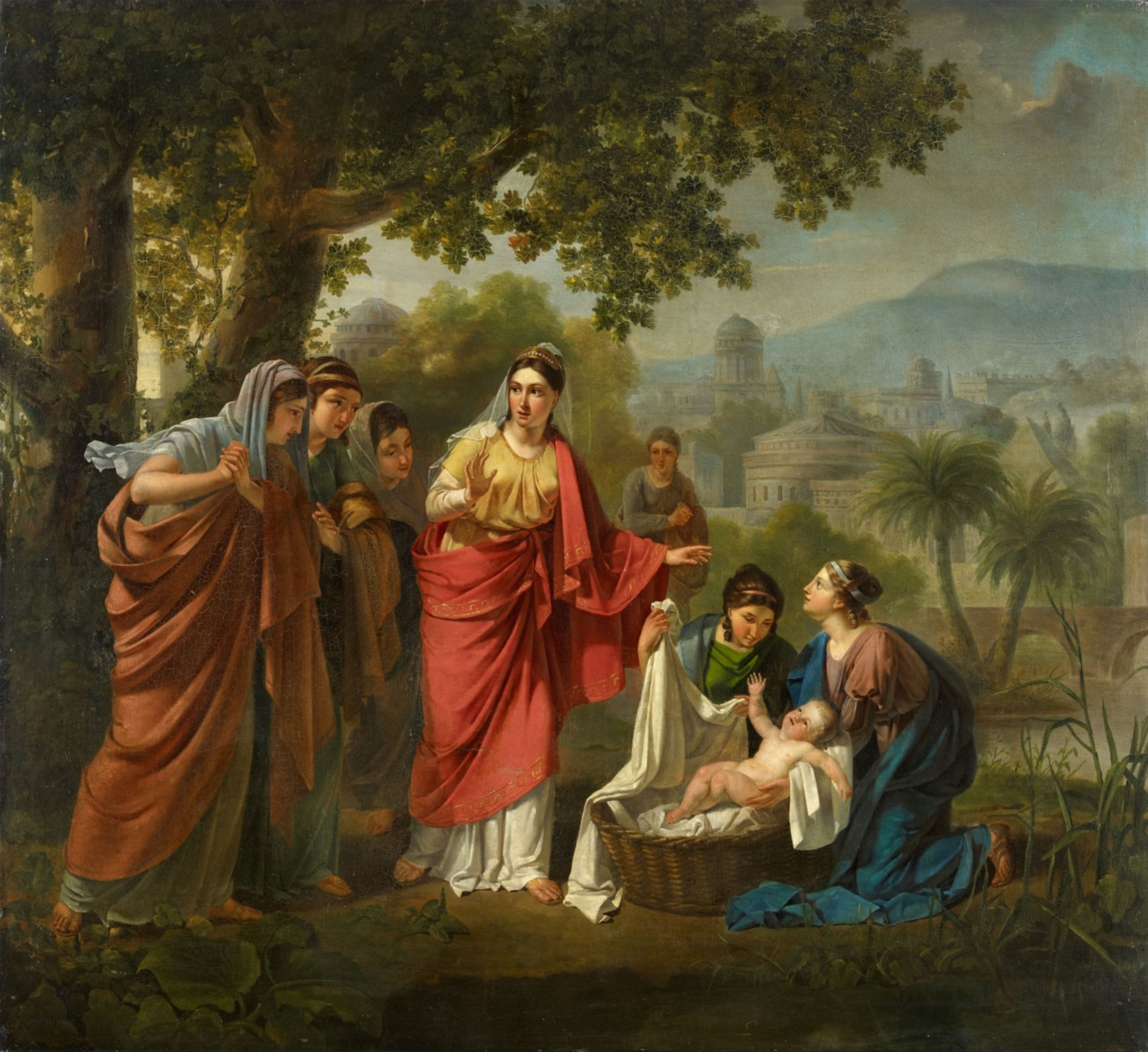
Finding of Moses

In November 1856 he was appointed as a teacher of painting at the Ghent Academy. He dedicated also much time to his educational role. He received official recognition from the Belgian government when he was made a knight in the Order of Leopold.

Geirnaert was married to Theresia Pinnoy. He was the teacher of, amongst others, Joseph Pinnoy (his brother in law, 1808-1866), Eduard Wallays, Theodore-Bernard De Heuvel (1817-1906), Henri De Nobele (1820-1870), Serafien De Vliegher (1806-1848), and Jacques Louis Godineau (1811-1873).

== Work ==
Geirnaert is known for his genre scenes, portraits as well as historical, religious and mythological paintings. His style was initially influenced by the Neoclassical style of Jacques-Louis David. This style was characterised by its limited palette and strict composition. Examples of work in this style are the Phaedra and Hippolytus (Bowes Museum) and the Finding of Moses (At Lempertz auction in Cologne of 25 May 2017, lot 1502), both dated 1819. The figures in these compositions are wearing garments from Classical antiquity. In the Finding of Moses the drapery is depicted in lively colours and the figures are set in an Italianate landscape offering in the background a view on an ancient city. The scene is bathed in a subtle light. The faces of the women are softly modelled and two of the faces appear in profile, as in Renaissance medallions.

He later painted historical scenes such as Godmaert in prison. This reflected the rise of the historical-Romanticism that was in vogue in Belgium from the 1830s which attempted to depict key episodes of Belgian history in a heroic manner. Geirnaert never embraced the flamboyant, Baroque expression this movement took in the works of Gustaf Wappers.

Geirnaert painted figures in a few landscapes by Adolphe Engel and in a Poultry seller by Jules Joos (Salon 1849 Antwerp).
