= Andries Cornelis Lens =

Flemish painter, illustrator, art theoretician and art educator

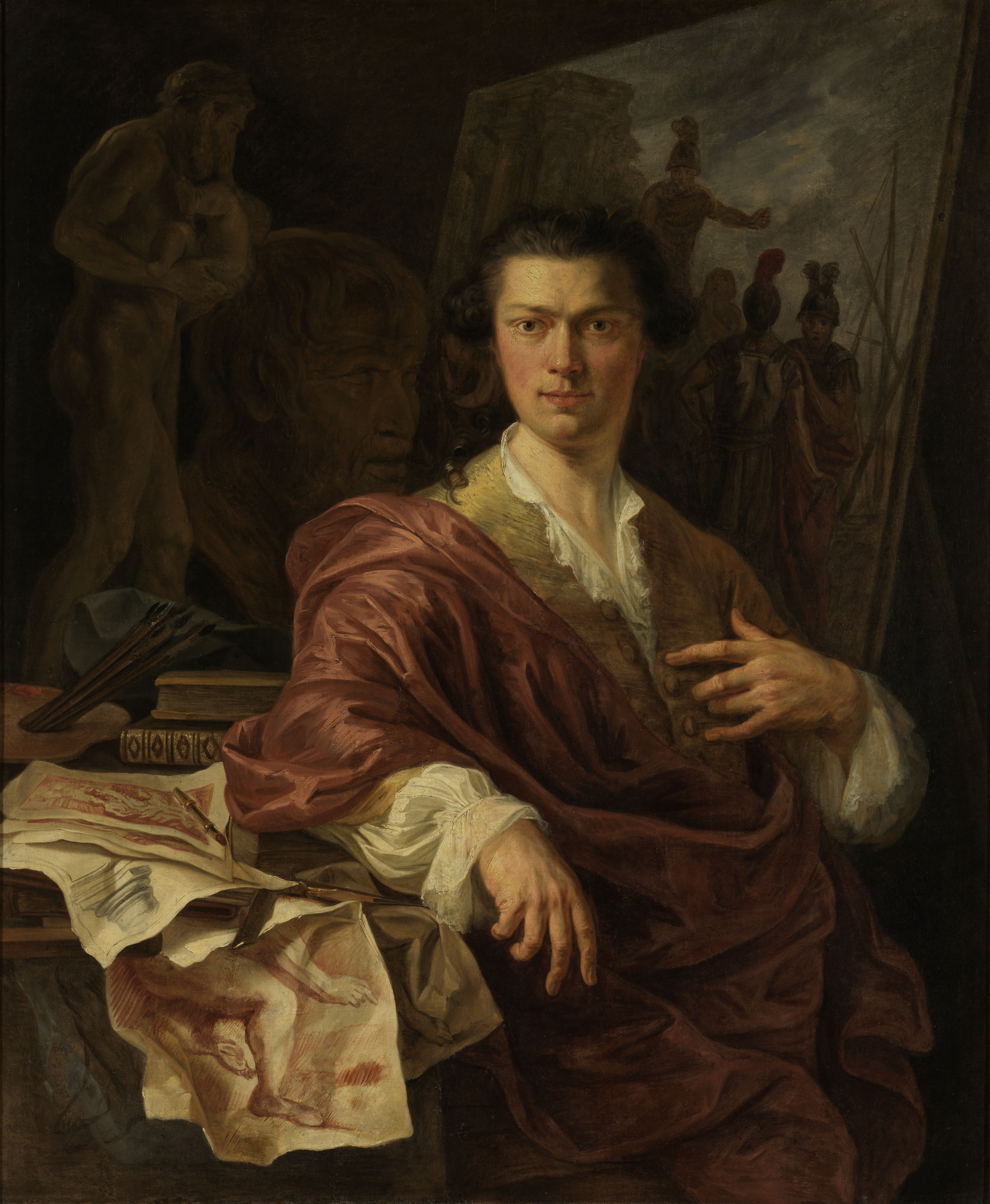
Portrait of Andries Cornelis Lens by Willem Jacob Herreyns

Andries Cornelis Lens or André Corneille Lens (Antwerp, 31 March 1739 – Brussels, 30 March 1822) was a Flemish painter, illustrator, art theoretician and art educator. He is known for his history paintings of biblical and mythological subjects and portraits. Wishing to contribute to the revival of painting in Flanders, he took his inspiration from the classical traditions of the 16th century and drew inspiration from Raphael. He was thus a promoter of Neoclassicism in Flemish art. He was a teacher and director of the Academy of Fine Arts of Antwerp. Lens was court painter to the governor-general of the Austrian Netherlands and settled in Brussels where he married. Lens was also a writer and historian who published an illustrated book which discussed the costumes, ornaments and furnishings of the various people in Antiquity and another book setting out his art theories.

== Life ==
Andries Cornelis Lens was the son of Corneille Lens and Magdalena Slaets. His father was originally from Tilff near Liège, a Walloon city then in the Prince-Bishopric of Liège. His father was a flower painter and gilder who had moved to Antwerp at a young age. Here he had joined the local Guild of Saint Luke. Corneille Lens became the dean of the Guild but often had conflicts with the Guild. Andries Cornelis Lens started his artistic training with the painter Carel Ykens the Younger. After Ykens died in 1753 he continued his studies with Balthasar Beschey. At the same time Lens studied at the Antwerp Academy where he was a precocious student who obtained several first prizes for life drawing, winning the second prize at the age of 15 and the first prize at the age of 17. One of his teachers at the Academy was the engraver Peter Martenasie. Martenasie thought drawing after the Antique and required his students to draw after Greek statues. Lens painted a portrait of Martenasie. Martenasie was influential on Lens' development towards a classicist style.

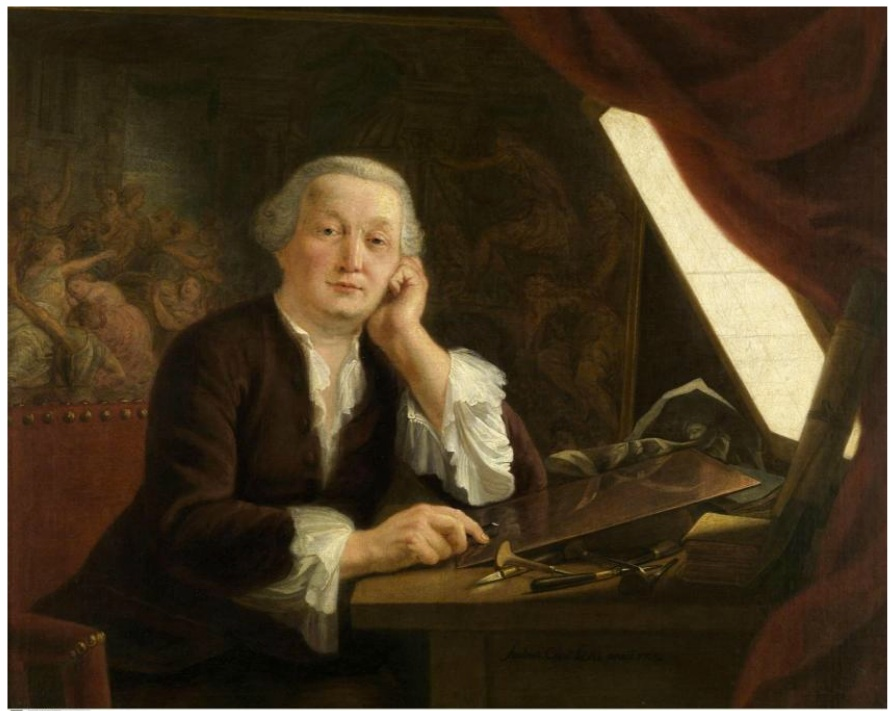
Portrait of Pieter Franciscus Martenasie

Lens became a director and teacher at the Antwerp Academy in 1763. To prove his qualifications for this position he gave the Academy in the year of his appointment a composition Hercules protects painting from Ignorance and Envy (Royal Museum of Fine Arts Antwerp). The governor-general of the Southern Netherlands Prince Charles Alexander of Lorraine took a liking to the young artist and appointed Lens as his court painter in September 1764. He also gave Lens a stipend which allowed him to go study in Italy. The artist left on 21 October 1764 for Italy where he studied for almost four years and copied many of the old Italian masters and in particular, Raphael. His brother Jacob (also known as 'Jacques-Joseph') who was seven years his junior accompanied him on his trip to Italy. They spent time in Florence, Rome and Naples. He travelled back to Antwerp via Paris where he was exposed to new currents in art. Upon his return to Antwerp Lens became a promoter of these new ideas.

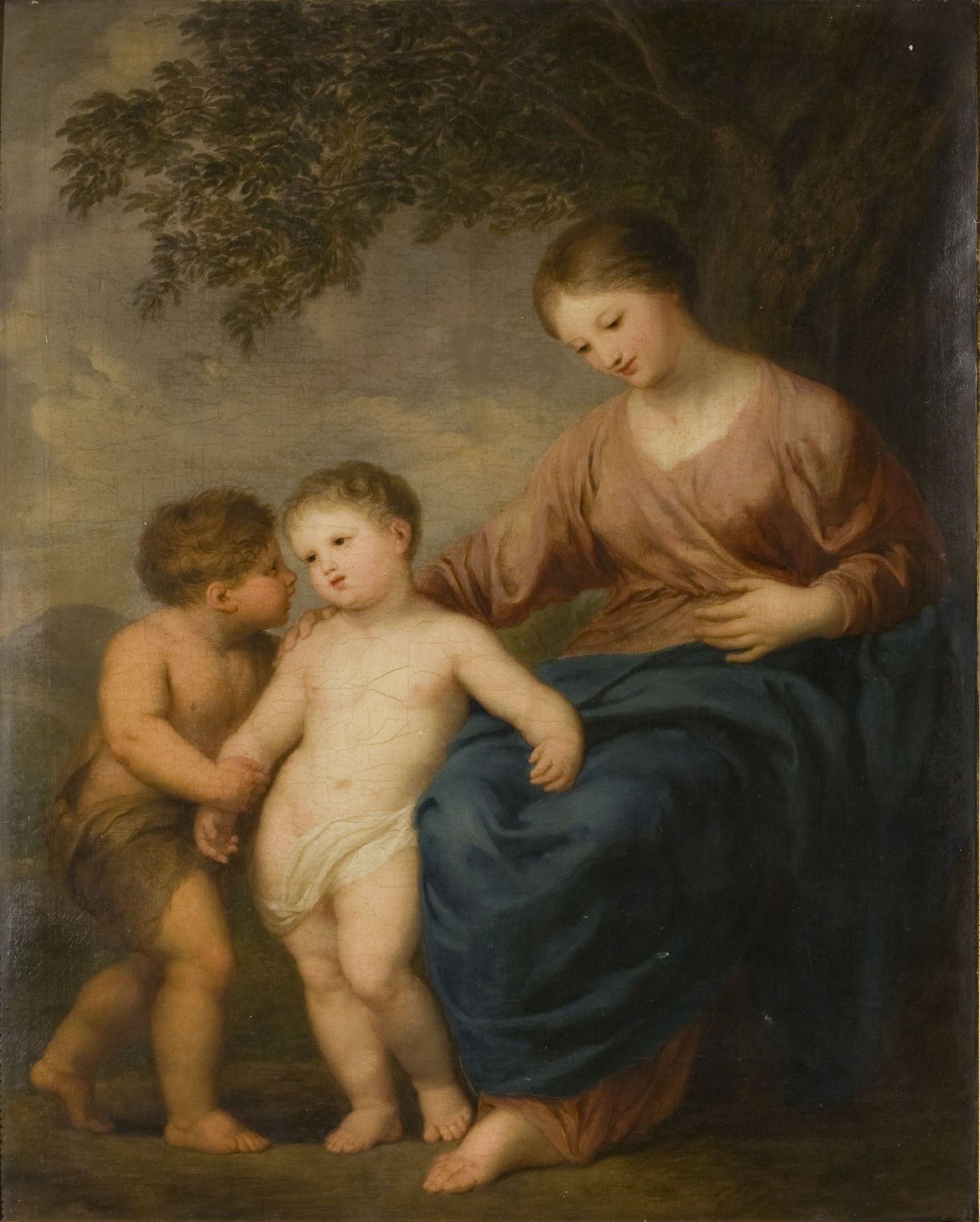
The Virgin, the Christ Child and St John

Lens tried to introduce reforms at the Antwerp Academy aimed at emphasizing the study after models from the Antique. His proposals met with resistance from his fellow directors. Like his father, Lens came into conflict with the Guild of Saint Luke. He regarded the Guild as an obstacle to the development of the artist and pleaded for the liberation of the artist from the guild system which made it a condition to practice art in any city in Flanders that the artist be a member of the local guild. When his young brother Jacob was denied a first prize in a local drawing competition, he took the matter very personally. He sent an anonymous letter to Prince Charles Alexander of Lorraine at the court of Brussels pleading for the removal of the Guild's authority over Antwerp's artists and placing that authority in the hands of the Academy, which would determine the fitness of an artist to practise. As a court painter himself, Lens was in fact not subject to the Guild restrictions. He argued that the mixing of the painters with the craftsmen in the Guild was an unnecessary burden on the painters. The Prince sent the anonymous letter on to the Antwerp city government, which in turn sought the advice of the Academy. The Guild opposed any reform to the current system. Lens visited the Prince to plead his case in person. He prevailed in the end and the empress Maria Theresa issued on 20 March 1773 an order that liberated the painters, sculptors and engravers from the guild requirements. The measure increased the prestige of Lens who obtained various commissions to produce altar pieces.

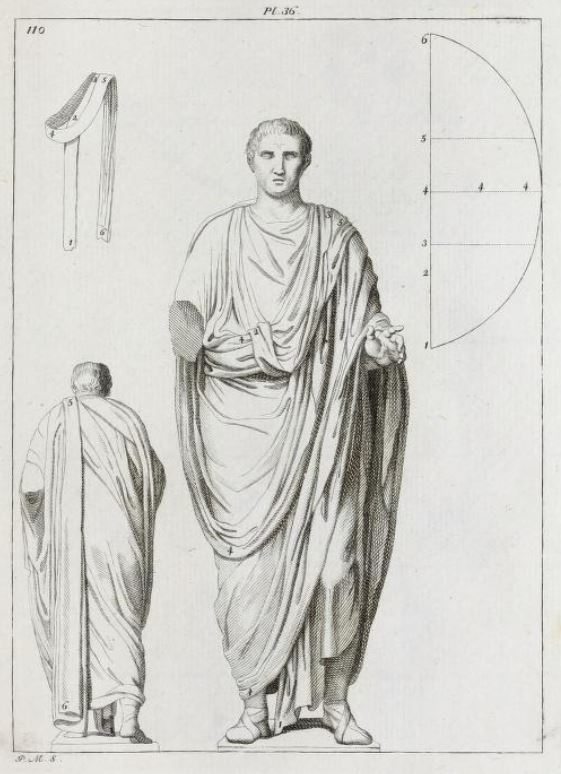
Plate 36 of Le Costume de Plusieurs Peuples de L'Antiquité

Lens remained in function at the Antwerp Academy. In 1776 he published in Liège at the publisher J.F. Bassompierre a French-language book entitled Le Costume de Plusieurs Peuples de L'Antiquité; Le Costume ou Essai sur les Habillements et les Usages de Plusieurs Peuples de L'Antiquité, Prouvé par les Monuments (The Costume of Various Peoples of Antiquity; The Costume or Essay on the Habits and Usages of Various Peoples of Antiquity, as Evidenced by the Monuments). The book of 412 pages and 51 plates discussed the costumes, ornaments and furnishings of the ancient Egyptians, Greek, Phrygians, Assyrians, Armenians, Hebrews, Romans, Persians as well as other nations. It was illustrated with 160 engravings by his old master Pieter Franciscus Martenasie. After the death of his patron Prince Charles Alexander of Lorraine in Brussels on 4 July 1780, Lens moved to Brussels. From here he sent in December 1780 to the Antwerp Academy his letter of resignation. When emperor Franz Joseph I of Austria visited Antwerp on 18 June 1781, Lens was able to arrange an invitation to show the emperor the artworks in the Cathedral of Antwerp. He was then invited by the emperor to join him in his carriage to show him other artistic highlights in Antwerp. Impressed by the artist who was able to discourse with him in fluent French, the emperor invited Lens to follow him to Vienna as a court painter. Lens had to decline as he had to marry Petronella Josepha de Suemoy in Brussels.

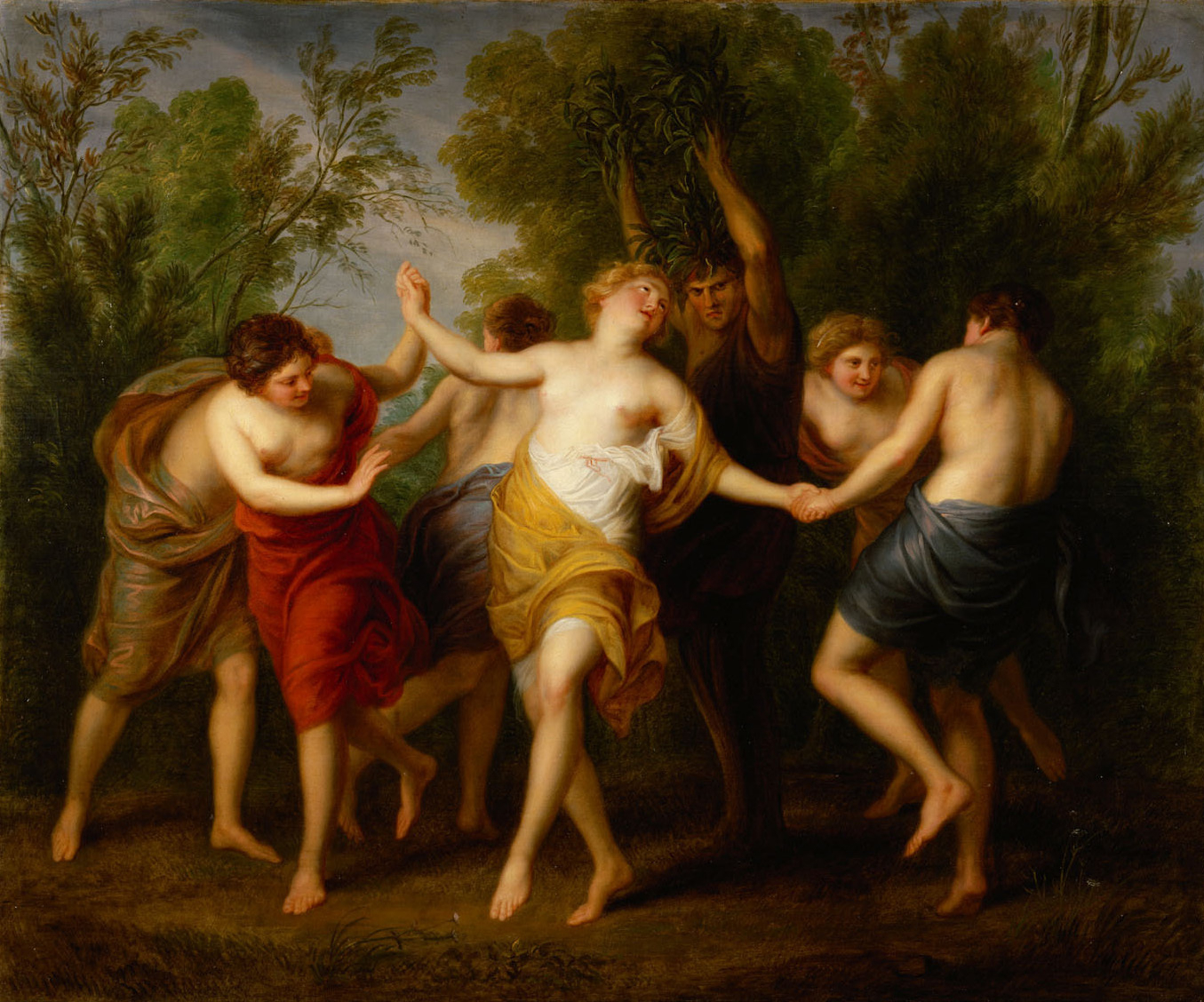
Dance of the Maenads

In Prince Albert Casimir, Duke of Teschen, the successor of Prince Charles Alexander of Lorraine as governor general of the Austrian Netherlands, Lens found a new patron. The Prince commissioned him to decorate his apartments in the Castle of Laeken near Brussels. These works were later moved to Vienna. Lens maintained a correspondence with Swiss Neoclassic painter Julien de Parme, which has been published.

The Brabant Revolution of 1789 and the later occupation of the Southern Netherlands by the French did not harm the artist. He was elected to the Institut de France, then called the Institut National. It is mainly his 1776 publication on ancient dress and costumes that had bolstered his reputation in a time when Neoclassicism in art triumphed in France. The French actor François-Joseph Talma even visited Lens in Brussels to pay hommage to the artist who had shown him in his book how to drape the Roman togas he wore on stage.

In 1811 Lens published in Brussels a book under the title Du bon goût, ou, De la beauté de la peinture, considérée dans toutes ses parties (Of good taste, or, Of the beauty of painting, considered in all its parts). It set out his artistic theories. By that time he had ceased painting. Lens was in 1803 a co-founder in Brussels of the Société de peinture, sculpture et architecture de Bruxelles (Society of painting, sculpture and architecture of Brussels), a so-called Société d'émulation intended to promote the progress of the arts. The Société d'émulation was composed of both amateurs, artists and art lovers. It held every year an exhibition of contemporary painters. It was thus similar to the Kunstmaatschappij (Society of Arts) established in Antwerp in 1778.

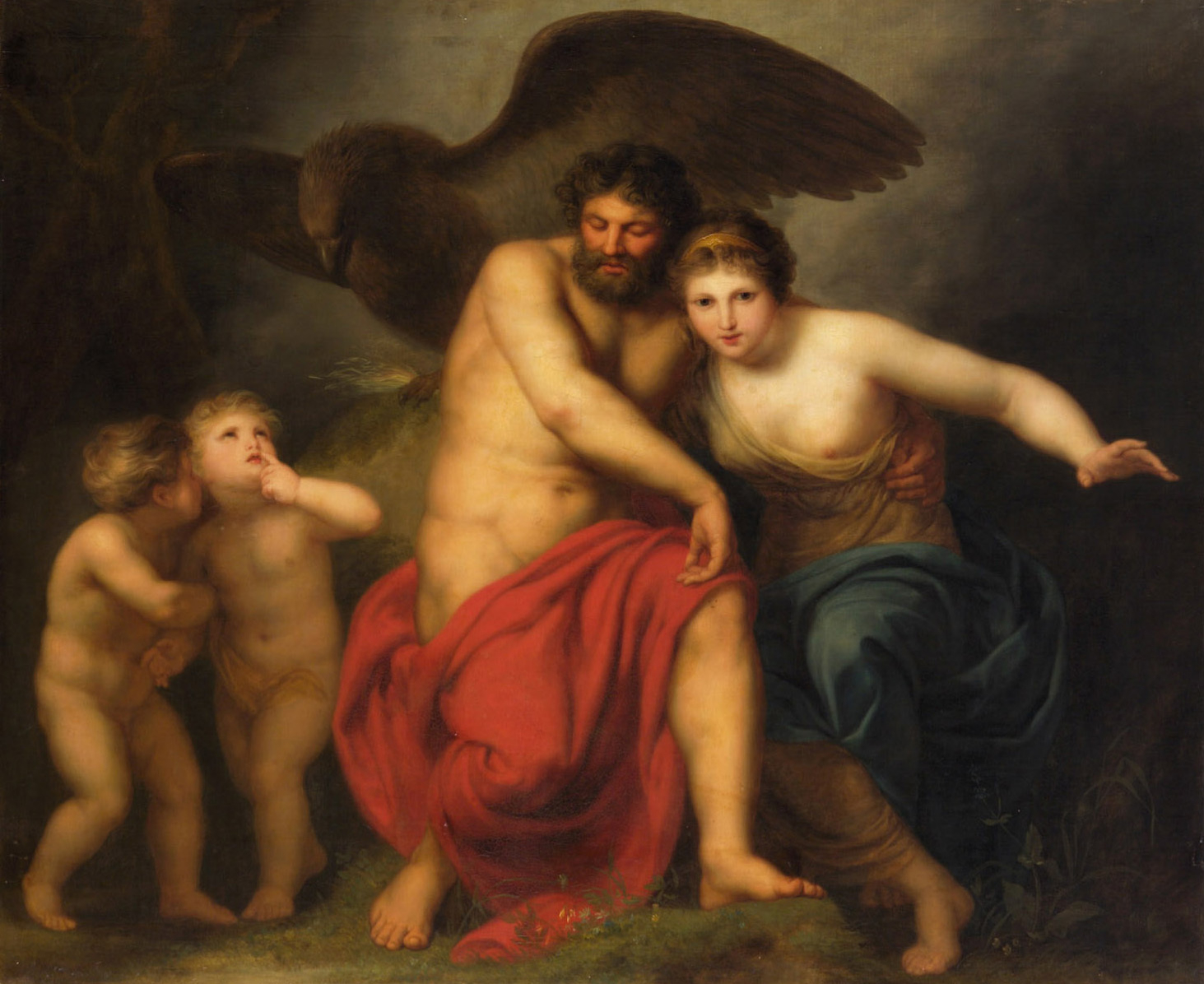
Zeus and Hera on Mount Ida

After 1815 when the Southern Netherlands had become part of the Kingdom of the Netherlands, Lens became a member of the Koninklijk (Nederlands) Instituut van Wetenschappen, Letterkunde en Schoone Kunsten (Royal Netherlands Academy of Arts and Sciences ) and was made a knight of the Belgian lion by King William I of the Netherlands.

Lens died on 30 March 1822 in Brussels.

His pupils included Jean-Pierre Borrekens, Cornelis Cels, Pierre Joseph Célestin François and Jacob van Strij.

== Work ==
Andries Cornelis Lens was a painter whose main subject matter were scenes from the bible and Antique mythology. He was an early representative of Neoclassicism in Flemish painting. His version of Neoclassicism is very personal and influenced by Flemish painting traditions.

While his work was not appreciated by his contemporary Flemish artists, he was successful in his time and had various important patrons. However, he did not establish his own school and his reputation did not survive for long.
