= Wilhelm Hendrik Franquinet =

Dutch painter (1785–1854)

Wilhelm Hendrik Franquinet (also known as Willem Hendrik or Guillaume Henri), born at Maastricht in 1785, was instructed by Herreyns at Antwerp. He afterwards visited Germany, and was a drawing-master at his native town from 1804 to 1816. In 1816 he settled in Paris, and in 1821 painted the Bacchanal, and in 1822-34 published a Galerie des Peintres, for which J. Chabert wrote the text. He died in New York in 1854.
