= Jean-Baptiste Madou =

Belgian painter and lithographer (1796–1877)

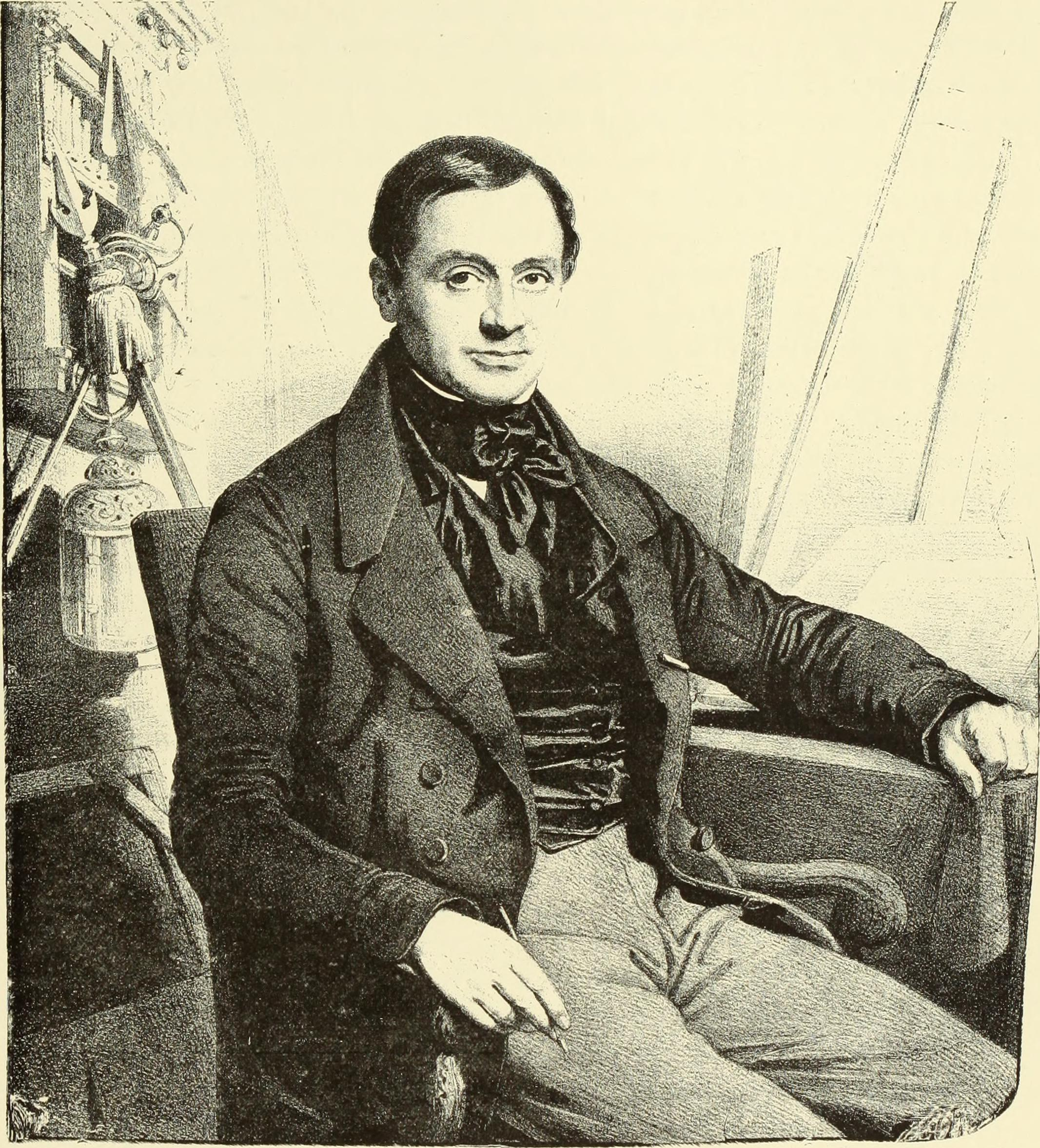
Portrait of Jean Baptiste Madou (from Bruxelles à travers les Âges, Hymans frères, 1884)

Jean-Baptiste Madou (French pronunciation: [ʒɑ̃ batist madu]; 3 February 1796, Brussels – 31 March 1877, Saint-Josse-ten-Noode) was a Belgian painter and lithographer.

== Life ==
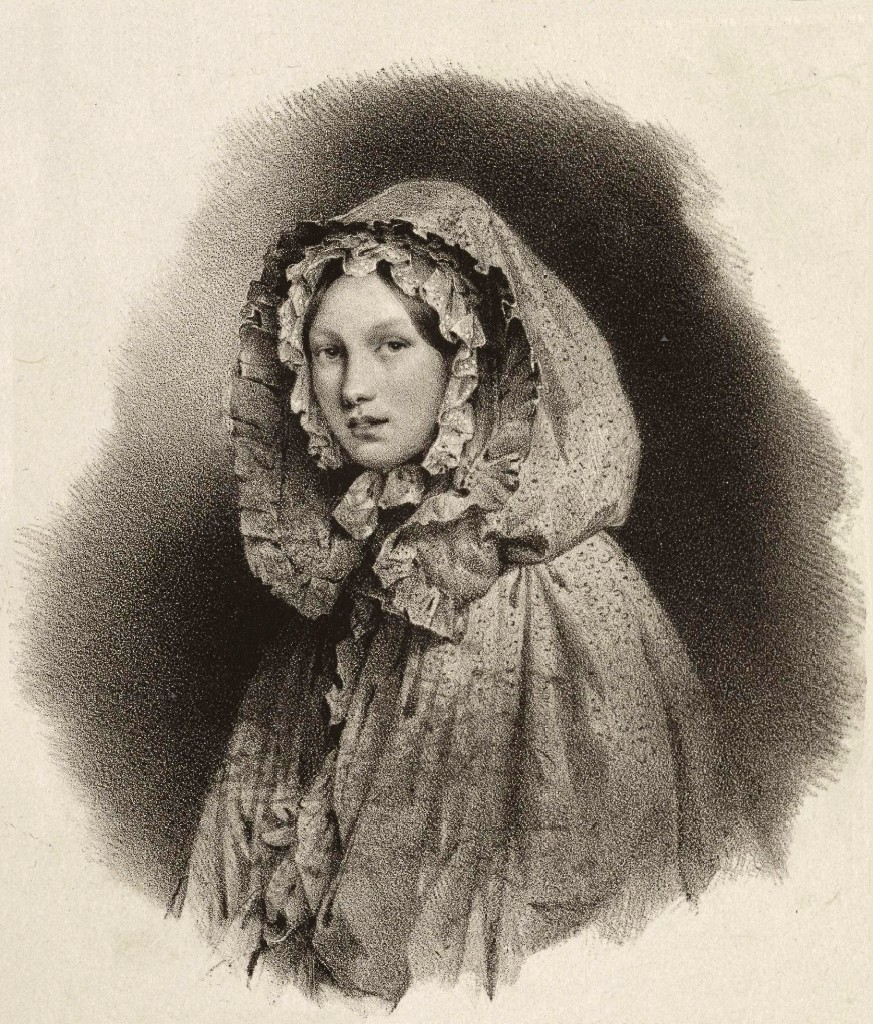
Brussels : Young Girl in a Cape

Madou was born in Brussels. He studied at the Brussels Academy of Fine Arts and was a pupil of Pierre Joseph Célestin François. While draftsman to the topographical military division at Kortrijk, he received a commission for lithographic work from a Brussels publisher. It was about 1820 that he began his artistic career. Between 1825 and 1827 he contributed to Les Vues pittoresques de la Belgique, to a Life of Napoleon, and to works on the costumes of the Netherlands, and later made a great reputation by his work in La Physionomie de la société en Europe depuis 1400 jusqu'à nos jours (1836) and Les Scenes de la vie des peintres.

It was not until about 1840 that Madou began to paint in oils, and the success of his early efforts in this medium resulted in a long series of pictures representing scenes of village and city life, including The Fiddler, The Jewel Merchant, The Police Court, The Drunkard, The Ill-regulated Household, and The Village Politicians. Among his numerous works mention may also be made of The Feast at the Chateau (1851), The Unwelcome Guests (1852, Brussels Gallery), generally regarded as his masterpiece, The Rat Hunt (acquired by Leopold II, king of the Belgians), The Arquebusier (1860), and The Stirrup Cup. At the age of sixty-eight he decorated a hall in his house with a series of large paintings representing scenes from La Fontaine's fables, and ten years later made for King Leopold a series of decorative paintings for the Château de Ciergnon. Madou died in Saint-Josse-ten-Noode on 31 March 1877 and was buried in the local cemetery.

He created the Société Royale Belge des Aquarellistes.

== Works ==
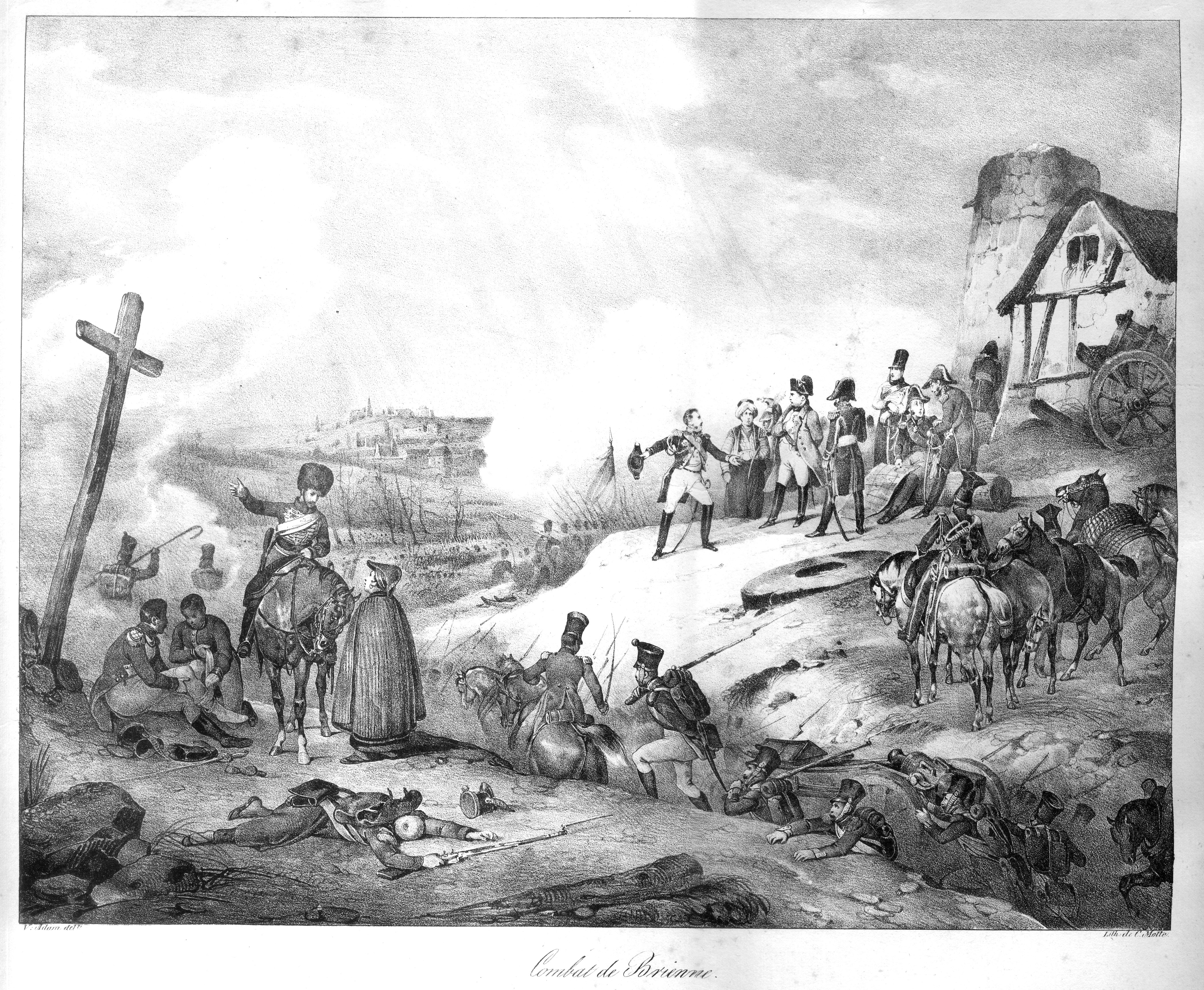
Combat de Brienne

- Le trouble-fête, 1854, Brussels, Royal Museums of Fine Arts of Belgium
- Les politiques au village, 1871, Brussels, Royal Museums of Fine Arts of Belgium

Some books illustrated by Madou:

- 1822 – Jean-Joseph de Cloet, Châteaux et monuments des Pays-Bas, Brussels, Jobard
- 1825 – Jean-Joseph de Cloet, Voyage pittoresque dans le Royaume des Pays-Bas, Brussels, Jobard.
- 1831 – Les Environs de Bruxelles
- 1836 – La physionomie de la société en Europe depuis 1400 jusqu'à nos jours
- 1839 – Benoit, P.J., Voyage à Surinam. Description des possessions Néerlandaises dans la Guyane. Cent dessins pris sur nature. Lithographies par Madou et Lauters, Bruxelles, Société des Beaux-Arts.
- 1839 – Les Belges peints par eux-mêmes
- 1842 – Scènes de la vie des Peintres des Écoles flamandes et hollandaises

== Expositions ==
- Saint-Josse-ten-Noode, Musée Charlier, du 26 octobre 2011 au 16 mars 2012 : Madou à visage découvert

== Sources ==
- P. & V. Berko, "Dictionary of Belgian painters born between 1750 & 1875", Knokke 1981, p. 443–445.
- P. & V. Berko, "19th Century European Virtuoso Painters", Knokke 2011, p. 508, illustrations p. 438–439.
- F. Stappaerts, "Notice sur Jean-Baptiste Madou", Annuaire de l’Académie royale de Belgique, 1879.
- A. Guislain, Caprice romantique, le "keepsake" de M. Madou, Bruxelles, 1947.
- Benezit, Dictionnaire critique et documentaire des peintres, sculpteurs, dessinateurs et graveurs, Paris, Librairie Gründ, 1976.
- L'affiche en Wallonie à travers les collections du Musée de la Vie Wallonne, catalogue d'exposition, Liège, 1980.
