= Eduard Wallays =

Belgian painter (1813–1891)

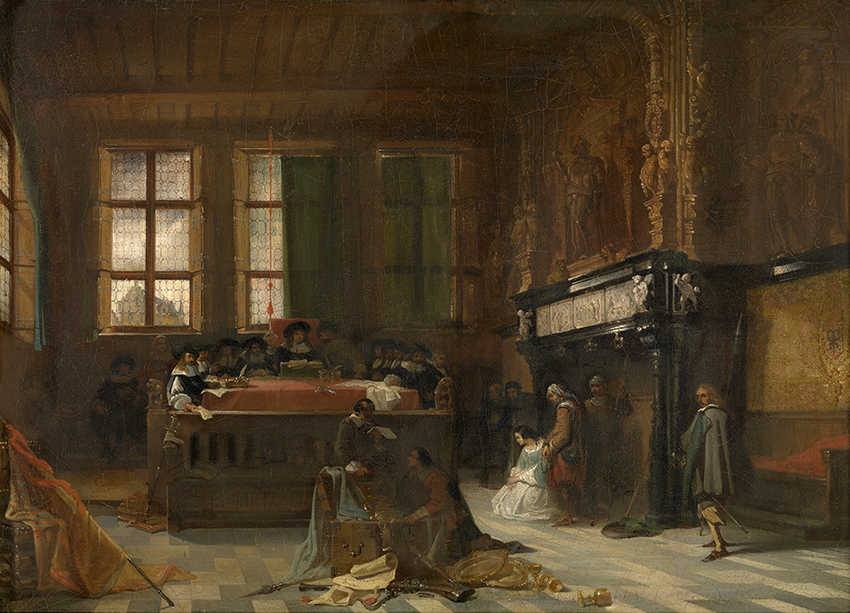
A Session of the Court

Eduard Wallays (2 July 1813 in Bruges – 28 January 1891 in Bruges) was a Belgian painter, graphic designer, and Director of the Bruges Academy of Fine Arts.

His father, Petrus Wallays (1764–1815), managed the grocery store at the Grote Markt in Bruges. His mother, Francisca Dupont, was originally from Kortrijk.

Wallays was educated at the Bruges Academy, and the Royal Academy of Fine Arts Antwerp. He also took classes with Jozef Geirnaert in Ghent. From 1835 to 1839, he lived in Paris, studying with Albert Gregorius and Antoine-Jean Gros, among others.

In 1835, he married Marie-Joséphine Legendre (1813–1865), the daughter of an author named Jean Legendre. The year following her death, he married her sister, Anne-Marie.

From 1855 to 1887, he served as Director of the Bruges Academy.

== Sources ==
- Jean-Luc Meulemeester, "Eduard Wallays en drie tekeningen uit het Steinmetzkabinet in Brugge", in: Biekorf Yearbook , 1986, pgs.196-200
- Guillaume Michiels, De Brugse School: Biografische aantekeningen en herinneringen over Brugse schilders uit de 19de en 20ste eeuw, Westvlaamse Gidsenkring, 1990.
- Lexicon van West-Vlaamse beeldende kunstenaars, Vol.2, pg.139, Vereniging van Westvlaamse Schrijvers, 1993 ISBN 978-90-7239-015-8
