= Willem Jacob Herreyns =

Flemish painter (1743–1827)

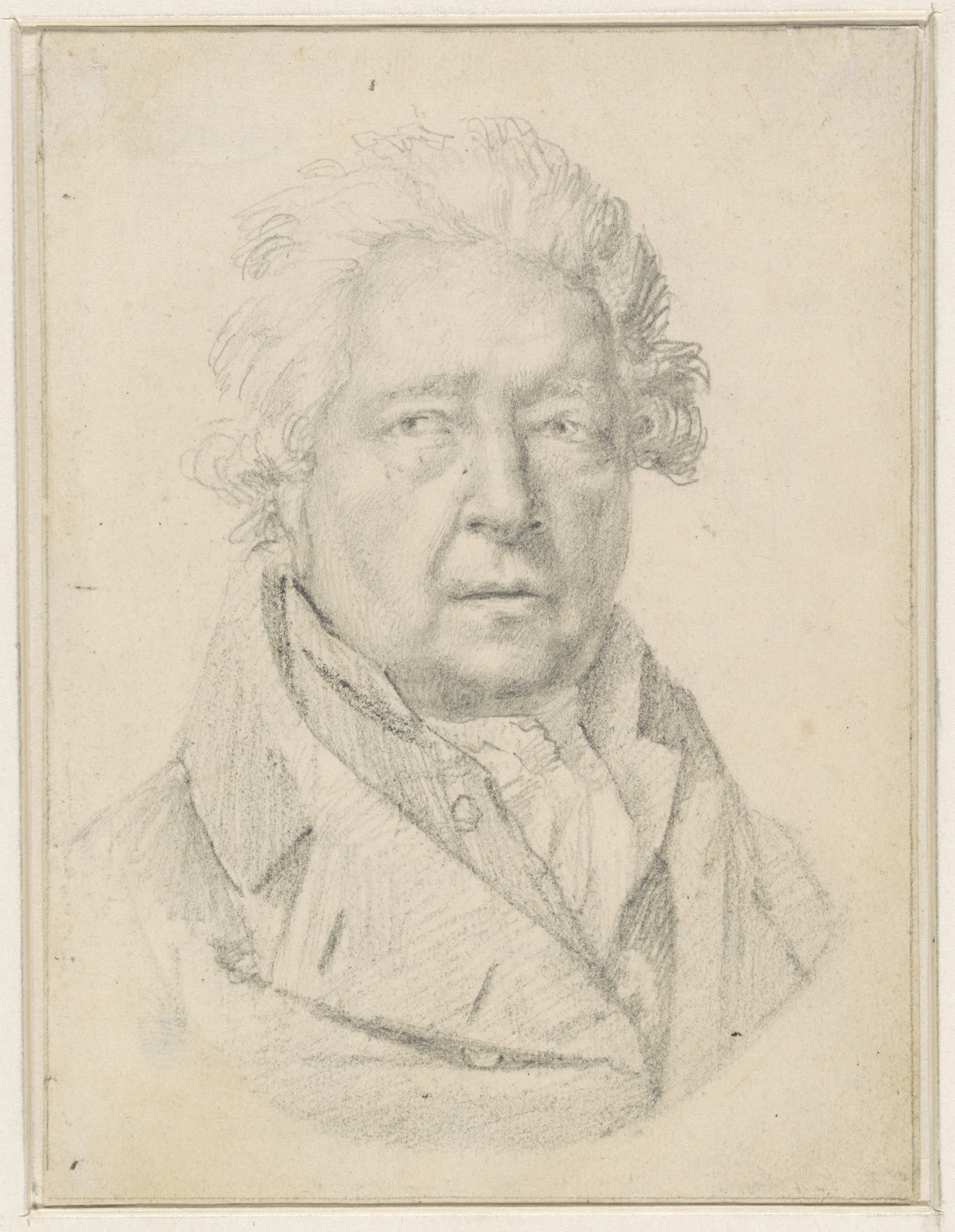
Self-portrait

Willem Jacob Herreyns (Antwerp, 10 June 1743 – Antwerp, 10 August 1827) was a Flemish painter of history subjects and portraits. He is regarded as one of the last painters in the tradition of the Flemish Baroque and the last follower of Peter Paul Rubens.

== Life ==
Herreyns was a scion of a family of artists. His great-grandfather was the painter and printmaker Jacob Herreyns the Elder. His grandfather Jacob Herreyns the younger was also a painter. His father Jacob III Herreyns was a painter and decorator. His uncle Daniel Herreyns the younger was a sculptor. He got his initial training from these relatives. Subsequently, he studied at the Academy of Antwerp where the prominent history and portrait painter Balthasar Beschey was one of his teachers. The young painter won in 1764 the first prize for painting from life at the academy. He completed his studies in the same year. A year later he became one of the six director-teachers of the academy as the replacement of Andries Cornelis Lens who had also been a pupil of Balthasar Beschey. In 1767 Herreyns left the academy and travelled.

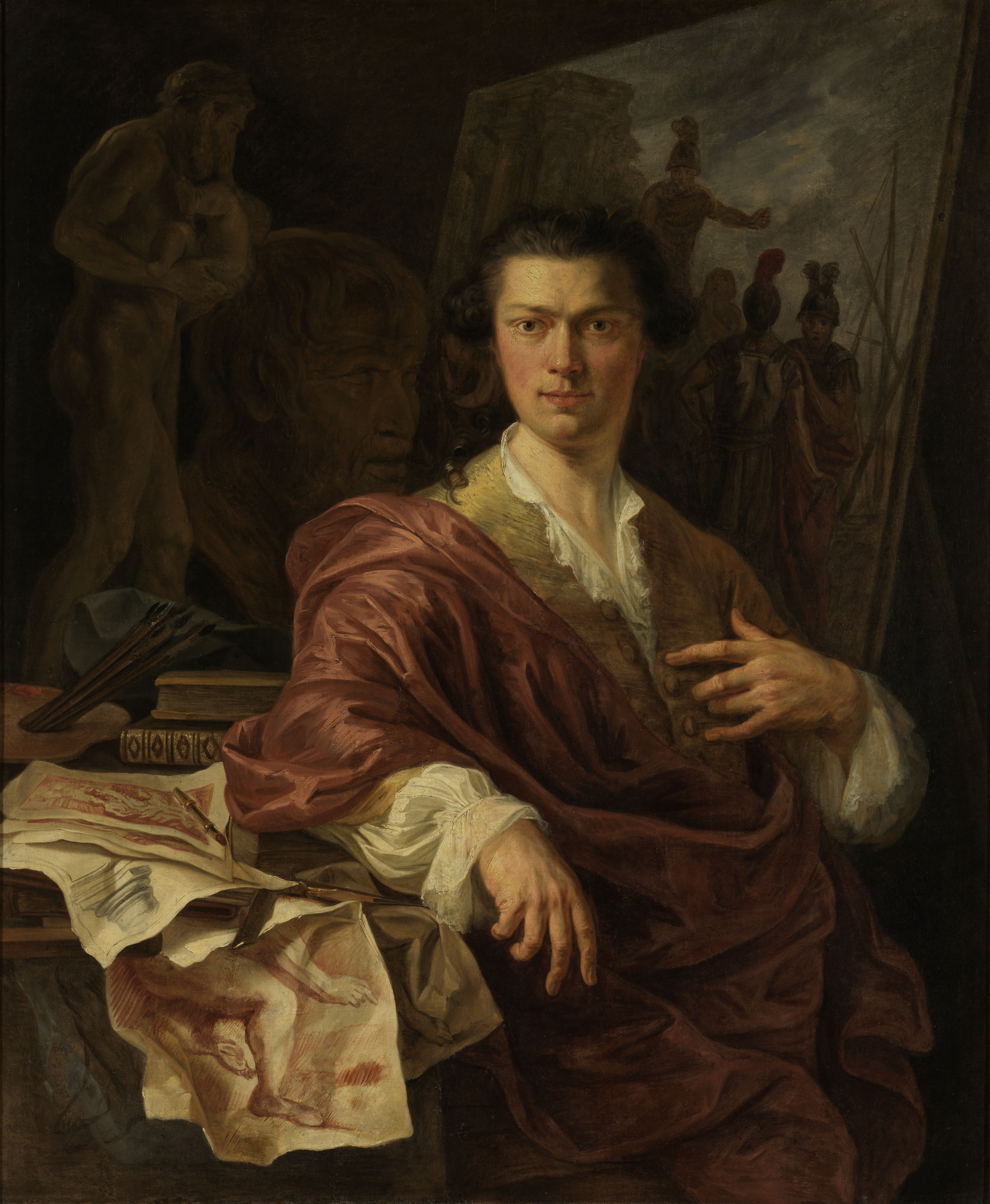
Portrait of the painter Andries Cornelis Lens

Upon his return to Belgium in 1771 he went to live in Mechelen where he got married. He was appointed as a director of the local drawing school. This school was renamed 'Academie van beeldende kunsten' (Academy of Visual Arts) in 1772 and was placed under the protection of Prince Charles Alexander of Lorraine, the then governor and de facto sovereign of the Austrian Netherlands. He taught a few arts subjects in Mechelen and worked on many commissions. He was offered a position by the Academy of Brussels but despite the attractive salary offered he decided to remain in Mechelen.

After invading the Austrian Netherlands in 1792, the French abolished the existing school system and as a result, Herreyns lost his academic position. Following the creation of central schools by the French, Herreyns returned to Antwerp in 1795 to become a teacher of drawing at the central school of the department of Deux-Nèthes. In 1797 he saved 328 paintings from the churches and monasteries that had been ordered closed by the French occupiers. Many of these paintings had in fact been stolen. He worked on the return of Rubens' paintings Our Lady with the parrot and The Madonna surrounded by Saints.

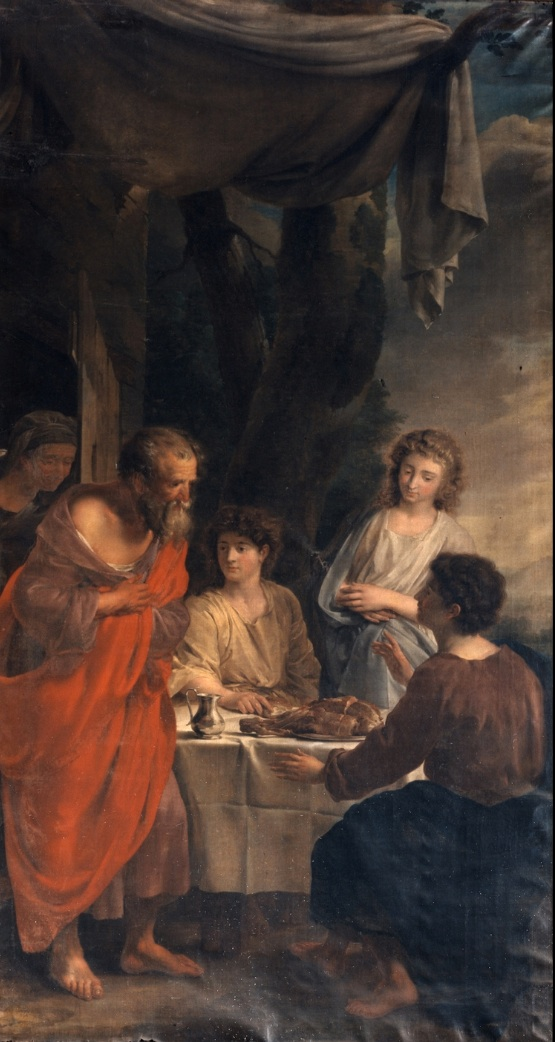
Abraham visited by the three Angels

In 1800 he was invited to become together with Balthasar Paul Ommeganck a teacher of the members of the newly established Genootschap der Kunsten ("'Society for the arts'). This was an organisation set up at the initiative of Mattheus Ignatius van Bree and included initially Jan van Bree, Jean-Baptiste Berré. Lambrecht Dentijn, Jan Carpentero, Ferdinand Verhoeven, Peter Iven, Michiel Dierickxen, Jan Peeters and others. The members undertook to meet monthly to show and discuss their works and enjoy the tuition of the older generation of painters such as Herreyns. At the end of 1800 the pre-existing artist organisation Konstmaatschappij, which had been established in 1788, was merged with the Genootschap der Kunsten. The merged organisation would organise an annual exhibition of its members' works. Herreyns served as the chairman of the merged entity.

In 1800 Herreyns was appointed a teacher-director of the former Antwerp Academy, which had been renamed l'École spéciale de peinture, sculpture et architecture d'Anvers (Special school of painting, sculpture and architecture of Antwerp). When the school was renamed an academy in 1804, Herreyns could maintain his position which he would hold until his death.

In 1810 he got permission from Napoleon to set up a museum in the former Franciscan monastery in Antwerp. In 1815, 38 of the 63 pictures removed by the French were added to its collection.

His pupils included Hendrik Frans de Cort, Wilhelm Hendrik Franquinet, Jozef Geirnaert, Cornelis & Gerard van Spaendonck, Gustaaf Wappers, and the young Antoine Wiertz.

== Work ==
Herreyns’ work was very highly regarded in his time. During a visit to Antwerp in 1780, the Swedish king Gustav III admired one of Herreyn's works called The Purification of the Virgin, then in the Saint-Michael's Abbey. The king immediately decided to appoint Herreyns as his court painter, although in reality Herreyns never went to Sweden. The Austrian Emperor Joseph II also praised his work during his visit to Mechelen and Herreyns painted two portraits of the emperor.

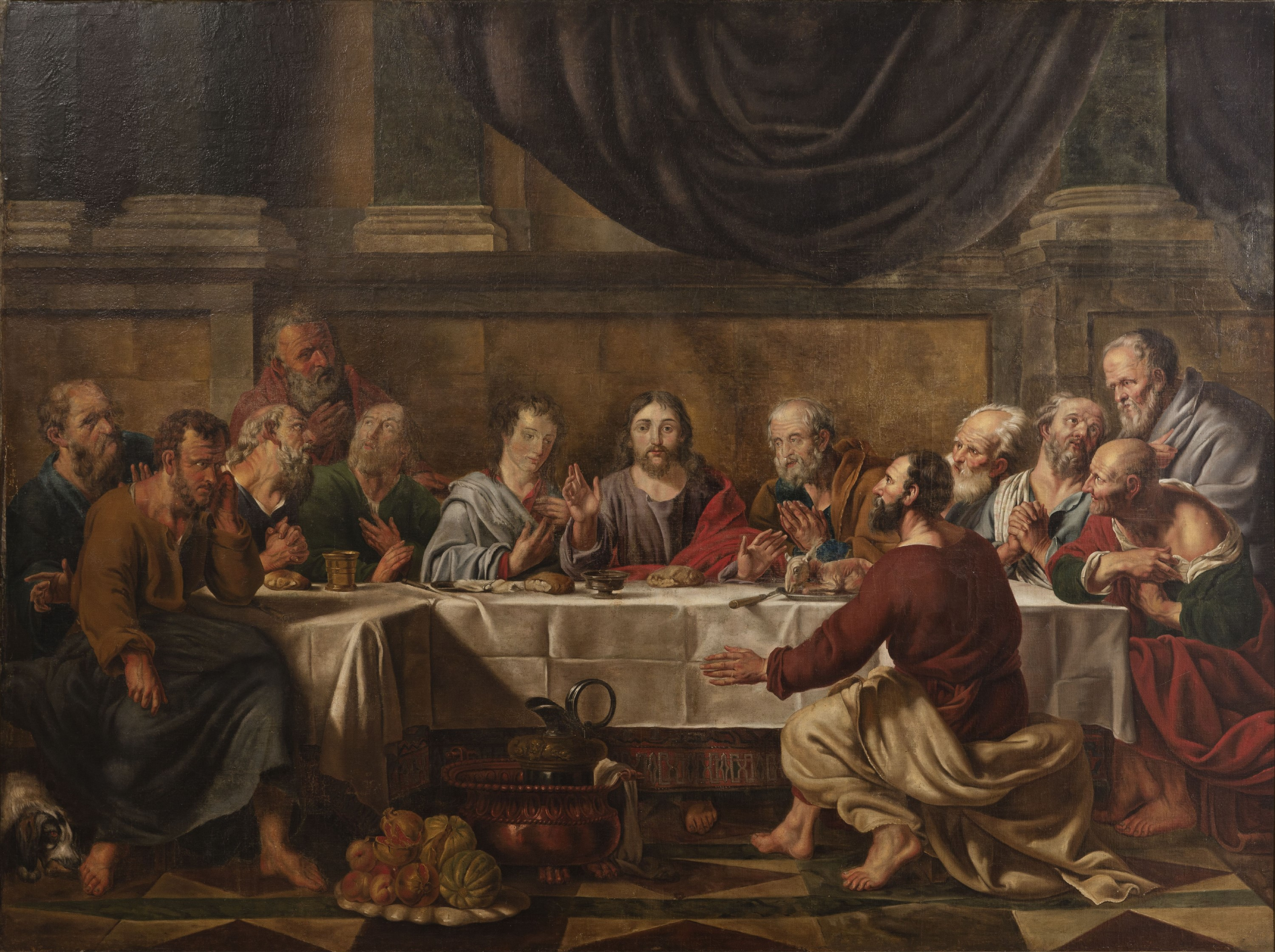
The Last Supper

His religious compositions stand in the Rubens tradition, which he had studied initially under his master Balthasar Beschey, who painted in the 17th century Flemish Baroque style. Herreyns received many commissions from religious institutions in Antwerp Province for which he painted large religious paintings. In 1775 he was commissioned by the Jezuits in Mechelen to design a series of floats on the occasion of the celebrations for the thousandth anniversary of the city's patron saint Rumbold of Mechelen. He designed the floats together with local sculptor Pieter Valckx and also designed the triumphal arches. The designs were inspired by the designs of Rubens for the 1635 Joyous Entry by the Cardinal-Infante Ferdinand into Antwerp. He painted a cavalry for Benedict Neefs in Hemiskem, now in the Royal Museum of Fine Arts in Antwerp. After his return to Antwerp in 1797 Herreyns mainly painted portraits for which he was highly esteemed.

His educational influence now eclipses his reputation as a painter. Herreyns is considered the last follower of the Flemish baroque tradition founded by Peter Paul Rubens. He was a good colorist (tending towards the dark and red) and a draughtsman with a precise line, but his work shows a certain coldness and lacks originality.

Herreyns' notable works include a Portrait of the painter Andries Cornelis Lens (after 1770), Godfrey, abbot of Tongerlo (1793) and John the Baptist in the Desert (1813). His work can be found in the Sint-Jan Baptist en Evangelist in Mechelen and the Royal Museum of Fine Arts in Antwerp.
