= Diplomatic history of World War I =

The diplomatic history of World War I covers the non-military interactions among the major players during World War I. For the domestic histories of participants see home front during World War I. For a longer-term perspective see international relations (1814–1919) and causes of World War I. For the following (post-war) era see international relations (1919–1939). The major "Allies" grouping included Great Britain and its empire, France, Russia (until 1917), Italy (from 1915) and the United States (from 1917). Opposing the Allies, the major Central Powers included Germany, Austria-Hungary, the Ottoman Empire (Turkey) and Bulgaria. Other countries (Belgium and Japan, for example) also joined the Allies. For a detailed chronology see timeline of World War I.

Non-military diplomatic and propaganda interactions among the belligerents aimed to build support for one's cause or to undermine support for one's enemies. Wartime diplomacy focused on five issues:

- subversion and propaganda campaigns to weaken the morale of the enemy
- defining and redefining the war goals, which became harsher as the war went on
- luring provisionally neutral countries (Italy, the Ottoman Empire, Bulgaria and Romania) onto one's side by offering slices of enemy territory
- encouragement of nationalistic minority movements within enemy territories, especially among Czechs, Poles, Arabs, Irish, and minorities in the Russian Empire
- peace proposals. Neutral countries and belligerents variously made multiple peace proposals; none of them progressed very far. Some were neutral efforts to end the horrors. Others involved propaganda ploys to show one's own side as reasonable and the other side as obstinate.

== War aims ==
Years later a myth grew up that the crowds and all the belligerent nations cheered and welcomed the war. That was not true – everywhere there was a deep sense of foreboding. In wartime Britain, and in neutral United States, reports of German atrocities and killing thousands of civilians, rounding up hostages, and destroying historic buildings and libraries caused a change of heart to an antiwar population. For example, suffragists took up the cause of the war, as did intellectuals. Very few expected a short happy war – the slogan "over by Christmas" was coined three years after the war began. Historians find that "The evidence for mass enthusiasm at the time is surprisingly weak."

=== Allied war goals ===
In 1914 the war was so unexpected that no one had formulated long-term goals. An ad-hoc meeting of the French and British ambassadors with the Russian Foreign Minister in early September led to a statement of war aims that was not official, but did represent ideas circulating among diplomats in St. Petersburg, Paris, and London, as well as the secondary allies of Belgium, Serbia, and Montenegro. Its provisions included:

- 1. "The principal object of the three allies should be to break German power and its claim to military and political domination;"
- 2. "Territorial modifications are to be determined according to the principle of nationality;"
- 3. Russia should annex certain parts of the Austro-Hungarian Empire.
- 4. "France should take back Alsace-Lorraine, adding to it if she likes part of Rhenish Prussia and of the Palatine;"
- 5–7. Provisions for new territory for Belgium and Denmark, and the restoration of the Kingdom of Hanover.
- 8. Austria should become a triple monarchy, upgrading the kingdom of Bohemia.
- 9. "Serbia should annex Bosnia, Herzegovina, Dalmatia, and northern Albania;"
- 10–11. Territory should be added to Bulgaria and Greece.
- 12. "England, France, and Japan should divide the German colonies;"
- 13. "Germany and Austria should pay a war indemnity."

No official statement of Allied war aims was issued. The secret treaties remained secret until the Bolsheviks came to power in Russia in November 1917 and began publishing them. Socialists had always alleged that capitalists had encouraged war in order to line their own pockets, and the evidence of promised new territories invigorated left-wing movements around the world. U.S. President Woodrow Wilson regained some of the initiative in January 1918 when he proclaimed his Fourteen Points, the first of which demanded: "Open covenants of peace, openly arrived at, after which there shall be no private international understandings of any kind but diplomacy shall proceed always frankly and in the public view."

Historian Hew Strachan argues that war aims focused on territorial gains were not of central importance anyway. They did not cause the war nor shape its course of action. Rather, he says:

Big ideas, however rhetorical, shaped the war's purpose more immediately and completely than did more definable objectives. ... "We fight", [H. G. Wells] declared, "not to destroy a nation, but to kill a nest of ideas ... Our business is to kill ideas. The ultimate purpose of this war is propaganda, the destruction of certain beliefs and the creation of others."

=== German war goals ===
The Germans never finalized a set of war aims. However, in September 1914, Kurt Riezler, a senior staff aide to German Chancellor Theobald von Bethmann Hollweg sketched out some possible ideas – dubbed by historians the "September Program". It emphasized economic gains, turning all of Central and Western Europe into a common market controlled by and for the benefit of Germany. Belgium would become a vassal state, there would be a series of naval bases threatening England, and Germany would seize much of Eastern Europe from Russia – as in fact it did in early 1918. There would be a crippling financial indemnity on France making it economically dependent on Germany. The Netherlands would become a dependent satellite, and British commerce would be excluded. Germany would rebuild a colonial empire in Africa. The ideas sketched by Riezler were not fully formulated, were not endorsed by Bethmann Hollweg, and were not presented to or approved by any official body. The ideas were formulated on the run after the war began, and did not mean these ideas had been reflected in a prewar plan, as historian Fritz Fischer fallaciously assumed. However, they do indicate that if Germany had won it would have taken a very aggressive dominant position in Europe. Indeed, it took a very harsh position on occupied Belgian and France starting in 1914, and in the Treaty of Brest Litovsk imposed on Russia in 1917, which liberated many of the subject peoples of Russia from Finland to Ukraine.

The stalemate by the end of 1914 forced serious consideration of long-term goals. Britain, France, Russia and Germany all separately concluded this was not a traditional war with limited goals. Britain, France and Russia became committed to the destruction of German military power, and Germany to the dominance of German military power in Europe. One month into the war, Britain, France and Russia agreed not to make a separate peace with Germany, and discussions began about enticing other countries to join in return for territorial gains. However, as Barbara Jelavich observes, "Throughout the war Russian actions were carried out without real coordination or joint planning with the Western powers." There was no serious three-way coordination of strategy, nor was there much coordination between Britain and France before 1917.

=== Approaches to diplomacy ===
Both sides employed secret treaties to entice neutral nations to join them in return for a promise of spoils when victory was achieved. They were kept secret until the Bolsheviks came to power in Russia in 1917 and began publishing all the details on the Allied side. The Allies especially promised that after defeating the Ottoman Empire they would give large slices in return for immediate help in the war. Some territories were promised to several recipients, on the principle that conflicts could be sorted out after victory was achieved. Some promises, therefore, had to be broken, and that left permanent bitter legacies, especially in Italy.

==== Secret treaties ====
Important secret treaties of this era include the secretly concluded treaty of Ottoman–German alliance signed on 2 August 1914. It provided that Germany and Turkey would remain neutral in the conflict between Austria-Hungary and Serbia, but if Russia intervened "with active military measures" the two countries would become military allies. Another important secret treaty was the Treaty of London, concluded on 26 April 1915, in which Italy was promised certain territorial concessions in exchange for joining the war on the Triple Entente (Allied) side. The Treaty of Bucharest was concluded between Romania and the Entente powers (Britain, France, Italy, and Russia) on 17 August 1916; under this treaty, Romania pledged to attack Austria-Hungary and not to seek a separate peace in exchange for certain territorial gains. Article 16 of that treaty provided that "the present arrangement shall be held secret". Blaming the war in part on secret treaties, President Wilson called in his Fourteen Points for "open covenants, openly arrived at".

==== Germany controlled by Hindenburg and Erich Ludendorff ====
The two sides had strikingly different approaches to diplomacy. The military leadership of Field Marshal Paul von Hindenburg and his deputy General Erich Ludendorff increasingly controlled Germany and the other Central Powers. They worked around the Kaiser and largely ignored the politicians and diplomats; they focused on military supremacy. The most dramatic example came when military command decided on unrestricted submarine warfare against Britain in early 1917, over the objections of Chancellor Bethmann Hollweg and other civilian leaders. Historian Cathal Nolan says their strategy was that "Germans must win fast and win everything or lose everything in a war of exhaustion: knock out Russia in 1917, defeat France and starve Britain, all before the Americans arrived in sufficient numbers to make a real difference on the Western Front." A military approach meant that victory was to be achieved by winning great campaigns against the main enemy armies. Allies were useful for providing hundreds of thousands of bayonets, and access to critical geographical points.

==== Allies bargain over goals ====
The Allies had a more complex multi-dimensional approach that included critical roles for diplomacy, finance, propaganda and subversion. The Lansdowne letter called for Britain to negotiate a peace with Germany, It was published by a London newspaper and written by Henry Petty-Fitzmaurice, 5th Marquess of Lansdowne, a former foreign secretary and war minister. Lansdowne came under withering criticism with few supporters and the government rejected the proposal. Further talk of a compromise solution was suppressed and the British and French war aim was to permanently destroy German militarism. When the United States joined in, Woodrow Wilson likewise in his 14 points emphasized the need to destroy militarism. Austria and Turkey were not the main targets, and a separate peace with either or both of them was always an option. The Allies bargained with neutrals such as Italy by promising them when victory came, the Central Powers would be broken up and critical territories would be given to the winners. In the Treaty of London (1915), Italy was promised several large slices of the Austro-Hungarian Empire. Russia was promised Constantinople in the Constantinople Agreement of 1915. the Jews were promised a homeland in Palestine in the Balfour Declaration of 1917, but the Arabs had already been promised a sovereign state in Turkish-controlled regions. Aspiring nationalities were promised their own homelands. France was promised Alsace-Lorraine, which had been ceded to Germany in 1871.

==== Allied finance and soft power ====
In terms of finance, the British generously loaned money to Russia, France, Italy and smaller allies. When British money ran out, the United States replaced it in early 1917 with even larger loans. The Allies put a heavy emphasis on "soft power" including economic aid and trade, and propaganda. For example, Britain cut off all shipments of cotton to Germany, but at the same time subsidized the American cotton industry by large purchases, to make sure that the rural South supported the war effort. Historians Richard D. Heffner and Alexander Heffner point to the "outstanding success of British propaganda" in molding American opinion, while "Germany's feeble propaganda effort proved highly ineffective". Allied propaganda emphasised the triumph of liberal ideas, and a war to end all wars—themes with a broad international appeal. The Germans kept quiet about their war aims of dominating all of Europe, for they realized it would not have a wide appeal. However, the German Foreign Ministry realized the value of subversion in a total war. It used money and propaganda to attempt to undermine morale of the allies, including Muslims in the British, Russian and Ottoman empires. They had even more success in subsidizing far left anti-war subversive elements, especially in Russia. Allied propaganda focused on identifying Germany with militarism and illustrating it with what it called the rape of Belgium as well as with the sinking of the RMS Lusitania. The Allies were embarrassed by its large Russian ally—it was a non-democratic autocracy that sponsored pogroms. The overthrow of the Tsarist regime in March 1917 by Russian liberals greatly facilitated American entry into the war as President Wilson could for the first time proclaim a crusade for idealistic goals.

==== German war goals ====
Germany avoided internal discussions of its war aims, because debate threatened political unity at home and with allies. As late as May 1917 the Chancellor warned the Reichstag that a discussion of war aims would be unwise. In January 1917 Germany made a major strategic blunder that historian Hew Strachan speculates may have cost it victory in the war. The German navy declared a full-scale blockade of Great Britain. In contrast to the highly successful surface blockade the Royal Navy had imposed on the Central Powers since the start of the war, the German blockade was to be enforced by the U-boat fleet using a strategy of unrestricted submarine warfare; in effect German submarines were given order to sink all merchant ships, regardless of nationality or cargo and without warning in loose proximity of the British coast. This was in violation of not only international law but solemn promises that Germany had made to keep the United States out of the war. The military made the decision, rejecting civilian advice, knowing it likely guaranteed war with the United States but it was seen as Germany's last chance for a decisive victory, one which could be secured before the Americans would be able to fully mobilize. By ignoring civilian advice the military failed to appreciate that Britain was financially bankrupt, and could no longer purchase needed raw materials nor provide urgently needed financial aid to its friends. Strachan maintains the new German submarine strategy "saved Britain" because Berlin had lost sight of how close it was to success in ruining the critical financial component of British strategy.

==== Color books justify action ====
Another avenue of diplomacy was publication. At the outbreak of war, the European powers began to publish selected, and sometimes misleading, compendia of diplomatic correspondence, seeking to establish justification for their own entry into the war, and cast blame on other actors for the outbreak of war. The first of these color books to appear was the German White Book which appeared on 4 August 1914, the same day as Britain's war declaration.

=== Toward a League of Nations ===
In the course of the war both sides had to clarify their long-term war aims. By 1916 in Britain and in neutral United States, long-range thinkers had begun to design a unified international organization to prevent future wars. Historian Peter Yearwood argues that when the new coalition government of David Lloyd George took power in December 1916, there was widespread discussion among intellectuals and diplomats of the desirability of establishing such an organization, when Lloyd George was challenged by Wilson to state his position regarding the postwar, he endorsed such an organization. Wilson himself Included in his Fourteen Points in January 1918 a "league of nations to insure peace and justice". British foreign secretary, Arthur Balfour, argued that, as a condition of durable peace, "behind international law, and behind all treaty arrangements for preventing or limiting hostilities, some form of international sanction should be devised which would give pause to the hardiest aggressor."

== Financing the war ==
The total direct cost of war, for all participants including those not listed here, was about $80 billion (in 1913 US dollars) Since $1 billion in 1913 is equivalent to about $25 billion in 2017 US dollars, the total cost comes to about $2 trillion in 2017 dollars. Direct cost is calculated by deducting normal prewar spending from actual expenditures during war. It excludes postwar costs such as pensions, interest, and veteran hospitals. Loans to/from allies are not included in "direct cost". Repayment of loans after 1918 is not included. The total direct cost of the war as a percent of wartime national income:

- Allies: Britain, 37%; France, 26%; Italy, 19%; Russia, 24%; United States, 16%.
- Central Powers: Austria-Hungary, 24%; Germany, 32%; Turkey unknown.

The amounts listed below are presented in terms of 1913 US dollars, where $1 billion then equals about $25 billion in 2017.

- Britain had a direct war cost about $21.2 billion; it made loans to Allies and Dominions of $4.886 billion, and received loans from the United States of $2.909 billion.
- France had a direct war cost about $10.1 billion; it made loans to Allies of $1.104 billion, and received loans from Allies (United States and Britain) of $2.909 billion.
- Italy had a direct war cost about $4.5 billion; it received loans from Allies (United States and Britain) of $1.278 billion.
- The United States had a direct war cost about $12.3 billion; it made loans to Allies of $5.041 billion.
- Russia had a direct war cost about $7.7 billion; it received loans from Allies (United States and Britain) of $2.289 billion.

In 1914 Britain had by far the largest and most efficient financial system in the world. Roger Lloyd-Jones and M. J. Lewis argue:

To prosecute industrial war required the mobilisation of economic resources for the mass production of weapons and munitions, which necessarily entitled fundamental changes in the relationship between the state (the procurer), business (the provider), labour (the key productive input), and the military (the consumer). In this context, the industrial battlefields of France and Flanders intertwined with the home front that produced the materials to sustain a war over four long and bloody years.

The two governments agreed that financially Britain would support the weaker Allies and that France would take care of itself. In August 1914, Henry Pomeroy Davison, a Morgan partner, traveled to London and made a deal with the Bank of England to make J. P. Morgan & Co. the sole underwriter of war bonds for Great Britain and France. The Bank of England became a fiscal agent of J. P. Morgan & Co., and vice versa. Over the course of the war, J. P. Morgan loaned about $1.5 billion (approximately $28 billion in today's dollars) to the Allies to fight against the Germans. Morgan also invested in the suppliers of war equipment to Britain and France, thus profiting from the financing and purchasing activities of the two European governments. Britain made heavy loans to Tsarist Russia; the Lenin government after 1920 refused to honor them, causing long-term issues.

In late 1917 Colonel House, President Wilson's representative, took the lead in organizing Allied non-military actions. Operating under the authority of the Supreme War Council, new committees had specialized tasks. The Inter-Allied Finance Council handled the issues of distributing money among the Allies. The United States had virtually all the available money by 1917, and made all the decisions. It loaned large sums to the main players, including loans to England that were redistributed to smaller allies. There were related councils dealing with purchases food, and shipping, including the Allied Council on War Purchases and Finance, the Inter–Allied Food Council, the Inter-Allied Meat and Fats Executive, the Inter-Allied Scientific Food Commission, the Inter–Allied Maritime Council, and the Inter–Allied Transport Council, among others.

== Allies ==
=== Great Britain ===
British diplomacy during the war focused on new initiatives in cooperation with the leading allies, promote propaganda efforts with neutrals, and initiatives to undermine the German economy, especially through a naval blockade. In 1915, an Allied conference began operations in Paris to coordinate financial support for allies, munitions productions, and rationing of raw materials to neutrals who might otherwise reship them to Germany. Britain established a blacklist, a shipping control commission and a ministry of blockade.

==== Entry ====
On 4 August, the British Government declared war in the King's name, taking Britain (and the Empire) into the war. Strategic risk posed by German control of the Belgian and ultimately French coast was considered unacceptable. Britain's relationship with her Entente partners, both France and Russia, were equally significant factors. The Foreign Secretary Edward Grey argued that the secret naval agreements whereby France deployed her fleet to the Mediterranean imposed a moral obligation on Britain to defend the Channel, even though they had not been approved by the Cabinet. What is more, in the event that Britain abandoned its Entente friends, it was feared that if Germany won the war, or the Entente won without British support, then, either way, Britain would be left without any friends. This would have left both Britain and her Empire vulnerable to attack. Domestic politics was a factor too as the antiwar Liberal Party was in power and decided on war to support France as it had long promised and to hold together and keep out the militaristic Conservatives. The issue of Belgium was not the real cause, but it was emphasized after the decision to win over Liberals who disliked warfare.

British Foreign office mandarin Eyre Crowe said:

Should the war come, and England stand aside, one of two things must happen. (a) Either Germany and Austria win, crush France and humiliate Russia. What will be the position of a friendless England? (b) Or France and Russia win. What would be their attitude towards England? What about India and the Mediterranean?

==== Balfour Declaration: Palestine and Jewish home land ====
The British and French decided that the entire Ottoman Empire would be divided among the victors, leaving only a small part for the Turks. In Asia, The French would get the northern half, and the British would get the southern half. British Cabinet paid special attention to the status of Palestine, looking at multiple complex factors. The steady advance of British armies moving up from Egypt indicated that Palestine and nearby areas would soon be under Allied control, and it was best to announce plans before that happened. In October 1915, Sir Henry McMahon, the British High Commissioner in Egypt, promised Hussein bin Ali, Sharif of Mecca the Arab leader in Arabia, that Britain would support Arab national ambitions in return for cooperation against the Turks. London thought there so much new land would become available that what Balfour called a "small notch" given to the Jews would not be a problem. The Zionist movement was gaining strength in the Jewish communities across Europe, including Britain and the United States. Promising them a home land would galvanize their support. Different Christian groups, especially Biblically-oriented Protestants, had an intense interest in the Holy Land, and in the Biblical predictions that indicated Christ could not return until the Jews regained their promised land. Finally, British Foreign Secretary Arthur Balfour himself had a long-standing concern with pogroms against Jews in Eastern Europe, and for years had been looking for ways to resettle them outside Russia. He had many in-depth conversations with the Zionist leader in Britain, Chaim Weitzman, and came up with a plan that Lloyd George and the cabinet approved. In November 1917, Balfour made a very short official announcement regarding Palestine. He promised a "national home" for the Jewish people, and said nothing would be done to prejudice the rights of the Arabs. He made no mention of statehood. His statement read:

His Majesty's Government view with favor the establishment in Palestine of a national home for the Jewish people and will use their best endeavors to facilitate the achievement of that object, it being clearly understood that nothing shall be done which may prejudice the civil and religious rights of existing non-Jewish communities in Palestine, or the rights and political status enjoyed by Jews in any other country.

President Wilson had known about the plan since March but had been noncommittal whether to support it. Finally, London asked directly his opinion and he secretly told House to tell them that he approved it. Historian Frank W. Brecher says, Wilson's "deep Christian sentiment" led him to seek "a direct governing role in the Near East in the name of peace, democracy and, especially, Christianity". In 1922, Congress officially endorsed Wilson's support through passage of the Lodge-Fish Resolution. The League of Nations incorporated the Declaration into the mandate over Palestine it awarded to Britain on 24 July 1922.

On the other hand, pro-Palestinian historians have argued that Wilson and Congress ignored democratic values in favour of "biblical romanticism" When they endorsed the Declaration. They point to a pro-Zionist lobby, which was active at a time when the small number of unorganized Arab Americans were not heard. Meanwhile, the U.S. State Department opposed the endorsement fearing it would alienate Arabs. In terms of British diplomacy, Danny Gutwein argues that the Declaration was the victory of the "radical" faction in the British government debating policy regarding the fate of the Ottoman Empire. The radicals proposed to partition that Empire in order to solidify Britain's control of the Middle East. The "reformist" faction lost.

==== Blockade of Germany ====
The Blockade of Germany by the Royal Navy was a highly effective technique to prevent Germans from importing food, raw materials, and other supplies. It repeatedly violated neutral rights, and the United States repeatedly objected. British diplomacy had to deal with that crisis. The loophole in the blockade system was shipments to neutral countries, such as the Netherlands and Sweden, which then sold the supplies to Germany. To stop that the British closely monitored shipments to neutral countries, declared that almost all commodities were contraband and would be seized, rationed imports to neutrals, and searched neutral merchant ships in Allied ports. They also blacklisted American firms known to trade with Germany. The United States protested but Wilson decided to tolerate Britain's policy.

=== France ===
By 1914 French foreign policy was based on an alliance with Russia, and an informal understanding with Britain; both assumed that the main threat was from Germany.

The crisis of 1914 was unexpected, and when Germany mobilized its forces in response to Russian mobilization, France also had to mobilize. Germany then invaded Belgium as part of its Schlieffen Plan to win the war by encircling Paris. The plan failed and the war settled into a very bloody deadlock on the Western Front with practically no movement until 1918.

Britain took the lead in most diplomatic initiatives, but Paris was consulted on all key points. The Sykes–Picot Agreement of 1916 with Britain called for breaking up the Ottoman Empire and dividing it into spheres of French and British influence. France was to get control of southeastern Turkey, northern Iraq, Syria and Lebanon.

French credit collapsed in 1916 and Britain began loaning large sums to Paris. The J.P. Morgan & Co bank in New York assumed control of French loans in the fall of 1916 and relinquished it to the U.S. government when the U.S. entered the war in 1917.

France suffered very heavy losses, in terms of battle casualties, financing, and destruction in the German-occupied areas. At the Paris Peace Conference, 1919, vengeance against defeated Germany was the main French theme, and Prime Minister Clemenceau was largely effective against the moderating influences of the British and Americans. France obtained large (but unspecified) reparations, regained Alsace-Lorraine and obtained mandates to rule parts of former German colonies in Africa.

French and British soldiers and diplomats worked well together during the war, and it became a major goal of French diplomacy to permanently continue the close relationship, and also bring the United States into this democratic triad. However, London and Washington were unwilling to commit to using their military force to uphold the European order established at the Paris conference. Clemenceau had gone too far in making demands that destabilized central Europe, in the views of Lloyd George and Woodrow Wilson. London reverted to pre-war priorities, emphasizing internal Imperial considerations, with the assumption that France would be something of a threat to British interests. The United States rejected any military alliance, and its foreign policy was in total confusion with the physical and mental collapse of president Wilson.

=== Russia ===
==== Leadership ====
Historians agree on the poor quality of Russia's top leadership. The Emperor made all the final decisions, but he repeatedly received conflicting advice and typically made wrong choices. He set up a deeply flawed organizational structure that was inadequate for the high pressures and instant demands of wartime. David Stevenson, for example, points to the "disastrous consequences of deficient civil-military liaison" where the civilians and generals were not in contact with each other. The government was entirely unaware of its fatal weaknesses and remained out of touch with public opinion; the foreign minister had to warn the Emperor that "unless he yielded to the popular demand and unsheathed the sword on Serbia's behalf, he would run the risk of revolution and the loss of his throne." The Emperor yielded and lost his throne anyway. Stevenson concludes:

Russian decision-making in July [1914] was more truly a tragedy of miscalculation ... a policy of deterrence that failed to deter. Yet [like Germany] it too rested on assumptions that war was possible without domestic breakdown, and that it could be waged with a reasonable prospect of success. Russia was more vulnerable to social upheaval than any other Power. Its socialists were more estranged from the existing order than those elsewhere in Europe, and a strike wave among the industrial workforce reached a crescendo with the general stoppage in St. Petersburg in July 1914.

Emperor Nicholas II took personal command of the Imperial Russian Army in 1915 and spent much of his time at army headquarters near the front lines, where his proclivity to misjudge leadership qualities, and misunderstand strategy, did the most damage. Meanwhile, morale plunged on the home front, the soldiers lacked rifles and adequate food, the economy was stretched to the limits and beyond, and strikes became widespread. The Tsar paid little attention. Tsarina Alexandra, increasingly under the influence of Grigori Rasputin, inadvisedly passed along his suggested names for senior appointments to the tsar. Thus, in January 1916, the Tsar replaced Prime Minister Ivan Goremykin with Boris Stürmer. Foreign Minister Sergey Sazonov was not a powerful player. Historian Thomas Otte finds that, "Sazonov felt too insecure to advance his positions against stronger men. ... He tended to yield rather than to press home his own views. ... At the critical stages of the July crisis Sazonov was inconsistent and showed an uncertain grasp of international realities. The tsar fired Sazonov in July 1916 and gave his ministry as an extra portfolio to Prime Minister Stürmer. The French ambassador was aghast, depicting Stürmer as "worse than a mediocrity – a third rate intellect, mean spirit, low character, doubtful honesty, no experience, and no idea of state business".

==== Propaganda ====
One of Russia's greatest challenges was motivating its highly diverse population that often lacked loyalty to the tsar. One solution was to avoid conscripting certain distrusted ethnic minorities. Another was a heavy dose of propaganda—using cartoons and verbal jokes—that ridiculed Kaiser Wilhelm II. The tactic backfired as Russians turned it against their own tsar. The stories of miseries, defeats and incompetence told by recruits on leave home gave a more powerful and negative narrative to every village; local anti-draft riots became common. Britain and France tried to meet Russia's problems with money and munitions, but the long supply line was so tenuous that Russian soldiers were very poorly equipped in comparison with their opponents in battle.

Meanwhile, Berlin, aware of the near-revolutionary unrest in Russia in the previous decade, launched its own propaganda war. The Foreign Ministry disseminated fake news reports that had the desired effect of demoralizing Russian soldiers. Berlin's most successful tactic was to support far-left Russian revolutionaries dedicated to attacking and overthrowing the tsar. The German foreign ministry provided over 50 million gold marks to the Bolsheviks, and in 1917 secretly transported Lenin and his top aides from their exile in Switzerland across Germany to Russia. Later that year they overthrew the liberal regime and began their march to control all of Russia. The Bolsheviks concentrated much of their propaganda on POWs from the German and Austrian armies. When Russia left the war in 1917 these prisoners returned home and many carried back support for revolutionary ideas that quickly swayed their comrades.

==== February Revolution ====
The Russian tsarist regime collapsed in March 1917 (February 1917 in the Julian calendar then in use in Russia) — Leon Trotsky subsequently suggested that the Western Entente powers plotted and fomented this February Revolution. For the following eight months a Provisional Government, a liberal regime, held power. Alexander Kerensky played a leading role in the new administration, and eventually became prime minister. Pavel Milyukov, leader of the moderate KADET party, became Foreign Minister. Many ambassadors and senior aides were tsarist appointees who resigned, so that the Foreign Ministry could barely function. Kerensky and Milyukov wanted to continue the tsarist foreign policy — especially regarding the war. They still hoped to gain control of the Turkish Straits and Constantinople. The British wanted to support Russian morale, while distrusting the depth of popular support for Russia's new government and questioning its capabilities. After long discussions the British settled on a cautious policy, which was "to give the impression of support for the Provisional Government, while at the same time delaying actual support in the form of munitions until the British needs were met and real evidence of Russian intention to prosecute the war actively was forthcoming."

The Provisional Government, even after giving Kerensky dictatorial powers, failed to meet the challenges of war-weariness, growing discontent among peasants and workers, and intrigues by the Bolsheviks. Public opinion, especially in the Russian army, had turned against the sacrifices for a hopeless war. The Bolsheviks, with a degreee of German government support, proposed a revolutionary foreign policy that would immediately end Russia's war and promote revolution across Europe.

==== Bolshevik versus White ====
After Lenin and his Bolsheviks overthrew the Kerensky regime in the October Revolution of 1917 (it was November by the Western calendar) Russia plunged into civil war, pitting the Bolsheviks against a series of "White" opponents led by tsarist generals. Finland, Estonia, Latvia, Lithuania and Poland successfully broke away and became independent countries. Ukraine, Georgia, Armenia, and Azerbaijan tried to do the same but were later retaken by the Bolsheviks. Lloyd George and French general Ferdinand Foch briefly considered an alliance with the Bolsheviks against Germany. Instead the Allies intervened militarily to guard against a German takeover, and in practice to help the counter-revolutionaries. Interventionist forces arrived from Britain, the United States, Japan, as well as France, Estonia, Poland, and Finland. The Bolsheviks proved successful, and after defeating them all by 1920 consolidated its hold on what became the Soviet Union (USSR). Lenin moved the national capital to Moscow. Diplomatically the new country was an unrecognized pariah state; only the Danish Red Cross would talk to them officially. Moscow was excluded from the Paris Peace Conference of 1919. It was deeply distrusted because of its support for revolutionary movements across Europe. However, only the communist revolution in Hungary was successful, and then only for a few months. However, after the failure of sponsored uprisings, Lenin took a more peaceful approach and one by one set up trade relations and, after that, diplomatic relations with the powers, starting with Britain and Germany in 1921. The United States was the last to act, with official recognition in 1933.

=== Belgium ===
Although the German invasion of Belgium in 1914 was the major factor in causing British entry into the war, the government of Belgium itself played a small role in diplomatic affairs. Its main role came as a recipient of relief from neutral countries, and its use by the Allies is a propaganda weapon against the Germans, and their emphasis on the atrocities involved in the Rape of Belgium. On 2 August 1914, the German government demanded that German armies be given free passage through Belgian territory. This was refused by the Belgian government on 3 August. King Albert I addressed his Parliament on 4 August, saying "Never since 1830 has a graver hour sounded for Belgium. The strength of our right and the need of Europe for our autonomous existence make us still hope that the dreaded events will not occur." The same day German troops invaded at dawn. Almost all of Belgium was occupied for the entire war, with the exception of a sliver in the far west, which was under the control of the Belgian Army. The government itself was relocated to the city of Sainte-Adresse in France; it still controlled the Belgian Congo in Africa. Belgium officially continued to fight the Germans, but the amount of combat was nominal. Belgium never joined the Allies. However, its foreign minister Paul Hymans was successful in securing promises from the allies that amounted to co-belligerency. Britain, France and Russia pledged in the Declaration of Sainte-Adresse in February 1916 that Belgium would be included in the peace negotiations, its independence would be restored, and that it would receive a monetary compensation from Germany for the damages. At the Paris peace conference in 1919, Belgium officially ended its historic neutral status, and became first in line to receive reparations payments from Germany. However, it received only a small bit of German territory, and was rejected in its demands for all of Luxembourg and part of the Netherlands. It was given colonial mandates over the German colonies of Rwanda and Burundi. Hymans became the leading spokesman for the small countries at Paris, and became president of the first assembly of the new League of Nations. When war began in 1914, Hymans met with President Wilson in Washington and got major promises of relief and food support. Relief was directed primarily by an American Herbert Hoover and involved several agencies: Commission for Relief in Belgium, American Relief Administration, and Comité National de Secours et d'Alimentation.

=== Italy ===
The War was an unexpected development that forced the decision whether to honor the alliance with Germany and Austria. For six months Italy remained neutral, as the Triple Alliance was only for defensive purposes. Italy took the initiative in entering the war in spring 1915, despite strong popular and elite sentiment in favor of neutrality. Italy was a large, poor country whose political system was chaotic, its finances were heavily strained, and its army was very poorly prepared. The Triple Alliance meant little either to Italians or Austrians – Vienna had declared war on Serbia without consulting Rome. Two men, Prime Minister Antonio Salandra and Foreign Minister Sidney Sonnino made all the decisions, as was typical in Italian foreign policy. They operated in secret, enlisting the king later on, but keeping military and political leaders entirely in the dark. They negotiated with both sides for the best deal, and got one from the Entente, which was quite willing to promise large slices of the Austro-Hungarian Empire, including the Tyrol and Trieste, as well as making Albania a protectorate. Russia vetoed giving Italy Dalmatia. Britain was willing to pay subsidies and loans to get 36 million Italians as new allies who threatened the southern flank of Austria.

=== Japan ===
Japan joined the Allies, seized German holdings in China and in the Pacific islands, cut deals with Russia and put heavy pressure on China in order to expand. In 1915 it secretly made the Twenty-One Demands on the new and fragile Republic of China. The demands included control over former German holdings, Manchuria and Inner Mongolia, as well as joint ownership of a major mining and metallurgical complex in central China, prohibitions on China's ceding or leasing any coastal areas to a third power, and other political, economic and military controls. The result was intended to reduce China to a Japanese protectorate. In the face of slow negotiations with the Chinese government, widespread anti-Japanese sentiment in China and international condemnation, Japan was obliged to withdraw the final group of demands when treaties were signed in May 1915.

Japan's hegemony in northern China was facilitated through other international agreements. One with Russia in 1916 helped to further secure Japan's influence in Manchuria and Inner Mongolia. Agreements with France, Britain, and the United States in 1917 recognized Japan's new territorial gains. Japanese loans to China tied it even closer. After the Bolshevik takeover of Russia in late 1917, the Japanese army moved to occupy Russian Siberia as far west as Lake Baikal. After getting China to allow transit rights, more than 70,000 Japanese troops joined the much smaller units of the Allied expeditionary force sent to Siberia in July 1918 as part of the Allied intervention in the Russian Civil War.

=== China ===
China was neutral at the start of the war, but that left her in a weak position as Japanese and British military forces in 1914 captured Germany's holdings in China. Japan occupied the German military colony in Qingdao, and occupied portions of Shandong Province. China was financially chaotic, highly unstable politically, and militarily very weak. Its best hope was to attend the postwar peace conference, and hope to find friends who would help block the threats of Japanese expansion. China declared war on Germany in August 1917 as a technicality to make it eligible to attend the postwar peace conference. They considered sending a token combat unit to the Western Front, but never did so. British diplomats were afraid that the U.S. and Japan would displace Britain's leadership role in the Chinese economy. Britain sought to play Japan and the United States against each other, while at the same time maintaining cooperation among all three nations against Germany.

In January 1915, Japan secretly issued an ultimatum of Twenty-One Demands to the Chinese government. They included Japanese control of former German rights, 99-year leases in southern Manchuria, an interest in steel mills, and concessions regarding railways. China did have a seat at the Paris Peace Conference in 1919. However, it was refused a return of the former German concessions and China had to accept the Twenty-One demands, although they had been softened somewhat because of pressure from the United States on Japan. A major reaction to this humiliation was a surge in Chinese nationalism expressed in the May Fourth Movement.

=== Romania ===
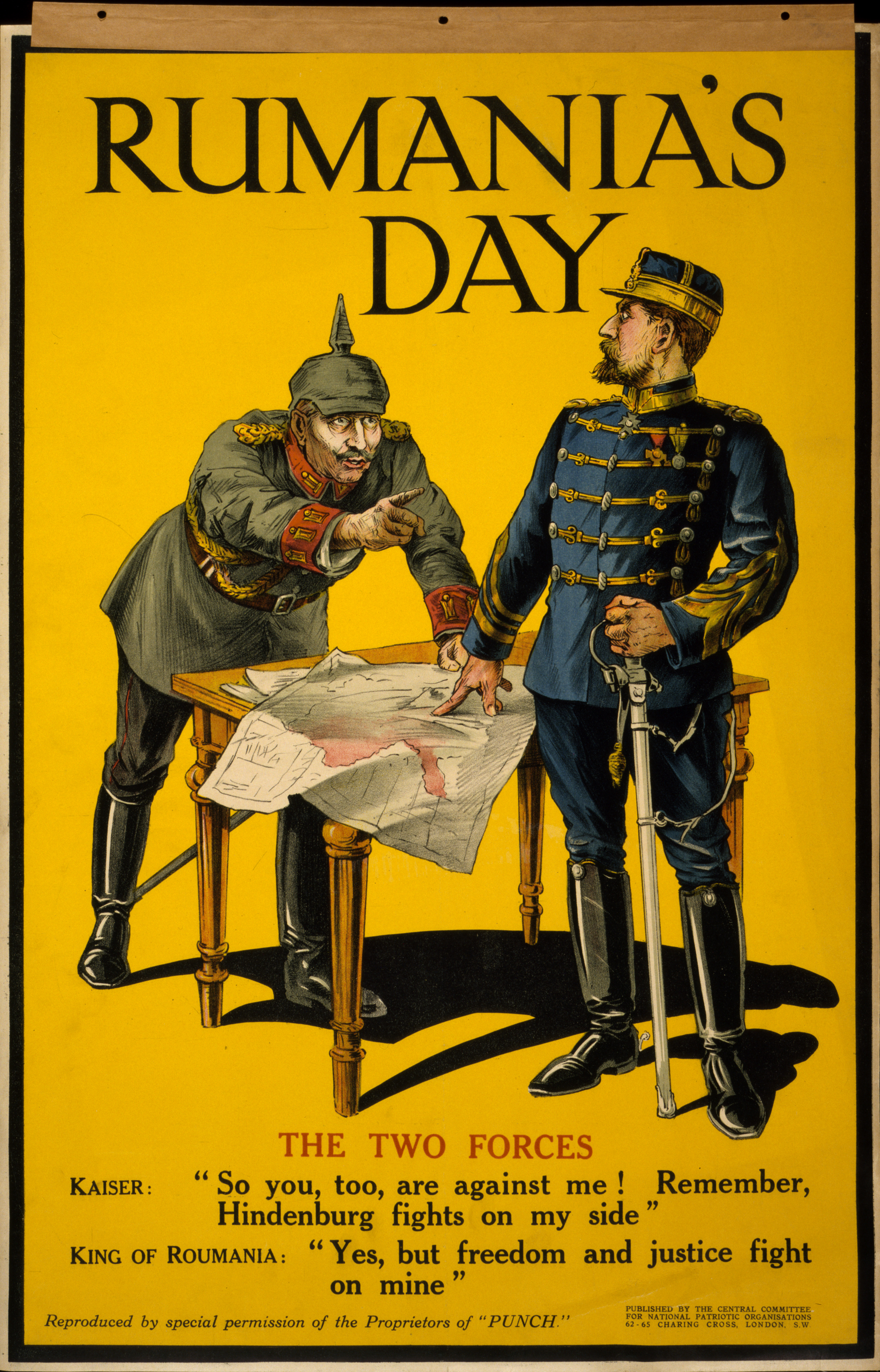
King Ferdinand (right) defies the German Kaiser in this British poster.

Romania, a small rural Orthodox nation of 7,500,000 people in 54,000 square miles of territory, was neutral for the first two years of the war. It had the major oil fields in Europe, and Germany eagerly bought its petroleum, as well as food exports. King Carol favored Germany but after his death in 1914, King Ferdinand and the nation's political elite favored the Entente. For Romania, the highest priority was taking Transylvania from Hungary, thus adding c. 5,200,000 people, 54% (according to 1910 census) or 57% (according to the 1919 and 1920 censuses) of them Romanians. The Allies wanted Romania to join its side in order to cut the rail communications between Germany and Turkey, and to cut off Germany's oil supplies. Britain made loans, France sent a military training mission, and Russia promised modern munitions. The Allies promised at least 200,000 soldiers to defend Romania against Bulgaria to the south, and help it invade Austria.

In August 1916 Romania entered the war on the Allied side. The Romanian army was poorly trained, badly equipped and inadequately officered. Romania did invade Austria-Hungary, but was soon thrown back, and faced a second front when Bulgarian troops, supported by German and Ottoman forces, invaded in Dobruja. By the end of 1916, two-thirds of the country (including the capital Bucharest) were occupied by the Central Powers and only Moldavia remained free. The Allied promises proved illusory, and when Romanian oilfields were threatened, the British destroyed the Ploiești oilfields to keep them out of German hands. On 22 July 1917, the Romanians launched a joint offensive with Russia against the Austro-Hungarian 1st Army, around Mărăști and the lower part of the Siret river, which resulted in the Battle of Mărăști. Although there was some initial success, a counter-offensive by the Central Powers in Galicia stopped the Romanian-Russian offensive.

The subsequent German and Austrian-Hungarian push to knock Romania out of the war was stopped at Mărășești and Oituz by the Romanian and Russian forces. When Russia collapsed in late 1917, the Romanian cause was hopeless, and Romania had no choice but to conclude the Armistice of Focșani on 9 December 1917 and in May 1918 the Treaty of Bucharest. It demobilized its surviving soldiers; nearly half the 750,000 men (335,706) it had recruited were dead, and the economy was ruined.

On 10 November 1918, as the Central Powers were all surrendering, Romania again joined the Allied side. On 28 November 1918, the Romanian representatives of Bukovina voted for union with the Kingdom of Romania, followed by the proclamation of a Union of Transylvania with Romania on 1 December 1918 by the representatives of Transylvanian Romanians gathered at the Great National Assembly of Alba Iulia, while the representatives of the Transylvanian Saxons approved the act on 15 December at the Mediaș Assembly. A similar gathering was held by the minority Hungarians in Cluj, on 22 December, to reaffirm their allegiance to Hungary. The Romanian control of Transylvania, which had also a minority Hungarian-speaking population of 1,662,000 (31.6%, according to the census data of 1910), was widely resented in the new nation state of Hungary. This started the Hungarian-Romanian War of 1919 between Romania and the Hungarian Soviet Republic, which also waged parallel conflicts with Czechoslovakia and the Kingdom of Serbs, Croats and Slovenes. The conflict with Romania ended with a partial Romanian occupation of Hungary.

=== Greece ===
One of the goals of Allied diplomacy in 1915 was to flip Greece from neutrality to support. Its location was ideal for operations in the Balkans against Austria, and Turkey. The Allies offered tempting gains, including Greek control of southern Albania, Cyprus, and Smyrna. The Greek government was deeply divided. Though both sides agreed that the success and expansion of Greece depended on the winner, King Constantine I, considered by many to be a Germaphile, expected the Central Powers would ultimately prevail, in contrast the government under liberal Prime Minister Eleftherios Venizelos expected an Allies victory. Greece remained neutral. In 1915, Venizelos offered an alliance with the Allies in exchange for control of Constantinople. This proposal was vetoed by Russia as one of their main war goal was to finally gain control over the Bosporus Straits, including Constantinople. Venizelos was initially forced to resign but returned to power only months later following his party's success in the June 1915 parliamentary elections.

Repeatedly, both sides violated Greek neutrality. Even before Greece entered the war, Venizelos allowed the Allies the use of the port of Salonika to attack Bulgaria and Turkey, however the Allied armies failed to advance beyond Salonika. In summer of 1916, the Athens government under King Constantine handed over Fort Roupel to the Germans, calling it a neutral act; it was denounced as a betrayal by the Venizelists. Allied forces fought the war from the Salonika base, engaging Bulgarian forces when they invaded Greece in August 1916 in the Battle of Struma. British and French troops landed in Athens in December 1916, hoping to overthrow the king, but failed and were forced to withdraw by Greek forces. Greece was brought to the brink of civil war; bitterly divided between those who supported Venizelos and those who stood by King Constantine, with the Allies blockading areas of Greece loyal to the former. By June 1917 Constantine was forced to capitulate, abdicating in favor of his son who supported Venizelos. At long last Greece declared war on the Central Powers on 30 June 1917. There was little movement on the front until the spring of 1918 and the Greek victory at the Battle of Skra-di-Legen, followed by Allied offensives launched in autumn 1918 that shattered the German, Austro-Hungarian and Bulgarian battle lines all across Europe. Following the Allied victory, Greece expected a large slice of the now former Ottoman Empire as spoils. Though Britain retained Cyprus, Greece was nominally granted significant cessions of land in Thrace and Asia Minor. However, the Greek Army, exhausted from fighting multiple consecutive protracted conflicts collapsed in the face of the resurgent Turkish Army now led by Ataturk, losing virtually all of territorial gains in the Greco-Turkish War (1919–1922). Greece wound up with only Western Thrace. Its most grievous legacy was profound political and social turmoil known as the "National Schism" that polarized Greece into two hostile political camps for generations.

== American entry in 1917 ==
American entry into the war came in April 1917, after two and a half years of efforts by President Woodrow Wilson to keep the United States neutral and broker a compromise peace. Wilson made all the key decisions in early 1917 with minimal consultations.

=== American neutrality ===
Few Americans had any inkling that war was imminent in 1914. Over 100,000 U.S. citizens found themselves trapped in Europe when war broke out and passenger ships stopped sailing. They had traveled to Europe for tourism, business, or to visit relatives, and were caught unaware when the war started. Future U.S. President Herbert Hoover, then a private citizen based in London, took charge of the repatriation effort.

In August 1914, former President of the United States William Howard Taft wrote that if Japan and his country remained neutral, they might be able to mediate and help end the new war in Europe. America maintained neutrality under president Wilson who insisted that all government actions be neutral, and demanded that the belligerents respect that neutrality and abide by the norms of international law. Addressing the Senate in August 1914, Wilson stated that the United States "must be impartial in thought as well as in action, must put a curb upon our sentiments as well as upon every transaction that might be construed as a preference of one party to the struggle before another". It remained ambiguous whether he meant the United States as a nation or each American as an individual. Wilson has been accused of violating his own rule of neutrality. Later that month, he explained himself privately to his top foreign policy advisor Colonel House, who recalled the episode later:

I was interested to hear him express as his opinion what I had written him some time ago in one of my letters, to the effect that if Germany won it would change the course of our civilization and make the United States a military nation. He also spoke of his deep regret ... that it would check his policy for a better international ethical code. He felt deeply the destruction of Louvain [in Belgium], and I found him as unsympathetic with the German attitude. ... He goes even further than I in his condemnation of Germany's part in this war, and almost allows his feeling to include the German people as a whole rather than the leaders alone. He said German philosophy was essentially selfish and lacking in spirituality. When I spoke of the Kaiser building up the German machine as a means of maintaining peace, he said, "What a foolish thing it was to create a powder magazine and risk someone's dropping a spark into it!" He thought the war would throw the world back three or four centuries. I did not agree with him. He was particularly scornful of Germany’s disregard of treaty obligations, and was indignant at the German Chancellor’s designation of the Belgian Treaty as being "only a scrap of paper" ... But although the personal feeling of the President was with the Allies, he insisted then and for many months after, that this ought not to affect his political attitude, which he intended should be one of strict neutrality. He felt that he owed it to the world to prevent the spreading of the conflagration, that he owed it to the country to save it from the horrors of war.

Apart from an Anglophile element supporting Britain, public opinion in 1914–1916 strongly favored neutrality. There were no calls to join the Central Powers—the German American community called for neutrality. Wilson kept the economy on a peacetime basis, and made no military preparations or plans for the war. He insisted on keeping the army and navy on its small peacetime base. Indeed, Washington refused even to study the lessons of military or economic mobilization that had been learned so painfully across the sea.

=== Submarine issue ===
The most important indirect strategy used by the belligerents was the blockade: starve the enemy of food and the military machine will be crippled and perhaps the civilians will demand an end to the war. The Royal Navy successfully stopped the shipment of most war supplies and food to Germany. Neutral American ships that tried to trade with Germany (which international law clearly allowed), were seized or turned back. The strangulation came about very slowly, because Germany and its allies controlled extensive farmlands and raw materials, but it eventually worked because Germany and Austria took so many farmers into their armies. By 1918 the German cities were on the verge of starvation; the front-line soldiers were on short rations and were running out of essential supplies. The Allied blockade had done its job. Germany responded with its own submarine-based blockade of Britain. When the large passenger liner RMS Lusitania was sunk in 1915 with the loss of over 100 American lives, Wilson made clear the American objection:

lies in the practical impossibility of employing submarines in the destruction of commerce without disregarding those rules of fairness, reason, justice, and humanity, which all modern opinion regards as imperative.

The Lusitania sinking was the event that decisively swung American opinion; do it again and would be grounds for a declaration of war by the United States. The British frequently violated America's neutral rights by seizing ships, but they did not drown anyone. Berlin acquiesced, ordering its submarines to avoid passenger ships. But by January 1917 Hindenburg and Ludendorff decided that unrestricted submarine attacks on all American ships headed to Britain blockade was the only way it could win the war. They knew that meant war with the United States, but they gambled that they could win before America's potential strength could be mobilized. They vastly exaggerated how many ships they could sink and how much that would weaken Britain; they did not figure out that convoys would defeat their efforts. They were correct in seeing that the United States was so weak militarily that it could not be a factor on the Western Front for more than a year. The civilian government in Berlin objected to the plan, but the Kaiser sided with the military; the civilian government in Berlin was not in charge.

Wilson, as he made clear in his Fourteen Points of January 1918, believed that peace would never come to a world that contained aggressive, powerful, non-democratic militaristic states. Peace required a world based on free democracies. There was never a possibility for compromise between these polar situations. America had to fight for democracy, or it would be fighting perpetually against ever-stronger evil enemies (stronger because they would gobble up weak neighbors whenever they could).

=== Ethnic groups ===
Ethnic groups in the United States became involved on both sides, putting pressure on the Wilson administration to either be neutral, or to give greater support to the Allies. Jewish Americans were hostile to Russia, but when the tsarist regime fell in February 1917, their objection to supporting the Allies fell away. When the British issued the Balfour Declaration in late 1917, which Wilson supported, Jewish support for the Allied cause surged. Irish Catholics were very hostile to supporting Great Britain, but Wilson neutralized that problem by seeming to promise the issue of Irish independence would be on his agenda after the war. He did not fulfill that promise, however, leading to furious outrage among Irish Catholics, who played a powerful role in the Democratic Party in most large cities. In 1919 they opposed the League of Nations, and in 1920 they gave lukewarm support to the Democratic presidential ticket. Ethnic German Americans strongly supported neutrality; very few spoke out on behalf of Germany itself. When the United States declared war, they went silent and were closely monitored for possible disloyalty. There was no actual disloyalty, but the political voice of the German-American community was greatly diminished. Scandinavian Americans generally favored neutrality, but like the Germans they had few spokesmen in Congress or high office.

=== National security ===
By 1916 a new factor was emerging—a sense of national self-interest and nationalism. The unbelievable casualty figures were sobering—two vast battles caused over one million casualties each. Clearly this war would be a decisive episode in the history of the world. Every American effort to find a peaceful solution was frustrated. Henry Ford managed to make pacifism look ridiculous by sponsoring a private peace mission that accomplished nothing. German agents added a comic opera touch. The agent in charge of propaganda left his briefcase on the train, where an alert Secret Service agent snatched it up. Wilson let the newspapers publish the contents, which indicated a systematic effort by Berlin to subsidize friendly newspapers and block British purchases of war materials. Berlin's top espionage agent, debonair Fanz Rintelen von Kleist was spending millions to finance sabotage in Canada, stir up trouble between the US and Mexico and to incite labor strikes. The British were engaged in propaganda too, though not illegal espionage. But they did not get caught; Germany took the blame as Americans grew ever more worried about the vulnerability of a free society to subversion. Indeed, one of the main fears Americans of all stations had in 1916–1919 was that spies and saboteurs were everywhere. This sentiment played a major role in arousing fear of Germany, and suspicions regarding everyone of German descent who could not "prove" 100% loyalty. Americans felt an increasing need for a military that could command respect; as one editor put it, "The best thing about a large army and a strong navy is that they make it so much easier to say just what we want to say in our diplomatic correspondence." Berlin thus far had backed down and apologized when Washington was angry, thus boosting American self- confidence. America's rights and America's honor increasingly came into focus. The slogan "Peace" gave way to "Peace with Honor". The Army remained unpopular, however. A recruiter in Indianapolis noted that "The people here do not take the right attitude towards army life as a career, and if a man joins from here he often tries to go out on the quiet." The Preparedness movement used its easy access to the mass media to demonstrate that the War Department had no plans, no equipment, little training, no reserves, a laughable National Guard, and a wholly inadequate organization for war. Motion pictures like The Birth of a Nation (1915) and The Battle Cry of Peace (1915) depicted invasions of the American homeland that demanded action.

=== Decision for war ===
The story of American entry into the war is a study in how public opinion changed radically in three years' time. In 1914 Americans thought the war was a dreadful mistake and were determined to stay out. By 1917 the same public felt just as strongly that going to war was both necessary and morally right. The generals had little to say during this debate, and purely military considerations were seldom raised. The decisive questions dealt with morality and visions of the future. The prevailing attitude was that America possessed a superior moral position as the only great nation devoted to the principles of freedom and democracy. By staying aloof from the squabbles of reactionary empires, it could preserve those ideals—sooner or later the rest of the world would come to appreciate and adopt them. In 1917 this very long-run program faced the severe danger that in the short run powerful forces adverse to democracy and freedom would triumph. Strong support for moralism came from religious leaders, women (led by Jane Addams), and from public figures like long-time Democratic leader William Jennings Bryan, the Secretary of State from 1913 to 1916. The most important moralist of all was President Woodrow Wilson—the man who so dominated the decision for war that the policy has been called Wilsonianism and event has been labelled "Wilson's War".

In 1917 Wilson, a Democrat, proved his political genius by winning the support of most of the moralists by proclaiming "a war to make the world safe for democracy". If they truly believed in their ideals, he explained, now was the time to fight. The question then became whether Americans would fight for what they deeply believed in, and the answer turned out to be a resounding "YES".

In early 1917 Berlin forced the issue. The decision to try to sink every ship on the high seas was the immediate cause of American entry into the war. Five American merchant ships went down in March. If further evidence were needed, the German foreign minister, Arthur Zimmerman, approached Mexico for an alliance; Mexico would join Germany in a war and be rewarded with the return of lost territories in Texas, New Mexico and Arizona. Outraged public opinion now overwhelmingly supported Wilson when he asked Congress for a declaration of war on 2 April 1917. The United States had a moral responsibility to enter the war, he proclaimed, to make the world safe for democracy. The future of the world was being determined on the battlefield, and American national interest demanded a voice. Wilson's definition of the situation won wide acclaim, and, indeed, has shaped America's role in world and military affairs ever since. Wilson saw that if Germany would win, the consequences would be bad for the United States. Germany would dominate Europe, which in turn controlled much of the world through colonies. The solution was "peace without victory" Wilson said. He meant a peace shaped by the United States along the lines of what in 1918 became Wilson's Fourteen Points.

=== Wartime diplomacy ===
The United States was an affiliated partner—an "ally" in practice but not in name. The U.S. had no treaty with the Allies, but did have high level contacts. Wilson assigned Colonel House the central role in working with British officials. As soon as the US declared war Britain sent the high-level Balfour Mission in April and May 1917. France sent a separate mission at the same time. Both missions were eager was to publicize the Allied cause and work on plans for wartime cooperation. Balfour met with Wilson and Colonel House to review the secret treaties which bound Britain and France to Italy and others. Members of the delegations met with many senior leaders in the national government, finance, industry and politics, to explain the British positions. Other meetings dealt with the supply of munitions and other exports, and the proposed Balfour Declaration. Britain asked for naval help against the submarine menace, but realizing the small size of the American army, did not initially ask for soldiers.

Both United States and Britain had issued idealistic visions of the postwar world in January 1918. Prime Minister David Lloyd George announced the British vision on 5 January, while Wilson spelled out his Fourteen Points on 8 January. The Wilsonian manifesto had a major impact around the world, and especially on Germany, which by October 1918 had decided to make peace on its terms. The other Allies did not issue postwar plans, for they were focused primarily on cash reparations from Germany and specific territorial gains from Austria and Turkey. The British and American manifestoes overlapped heavily. They both specified the right of self-determination for nationalities, and the creation of a new international organization to keep the peace. However, they disagreed regarding reparations to be paid by the loser, which Wilson opposed at first. Wilson also wanted lowering of trade barriers and especially freedom of the seas, which the British could not endorse.

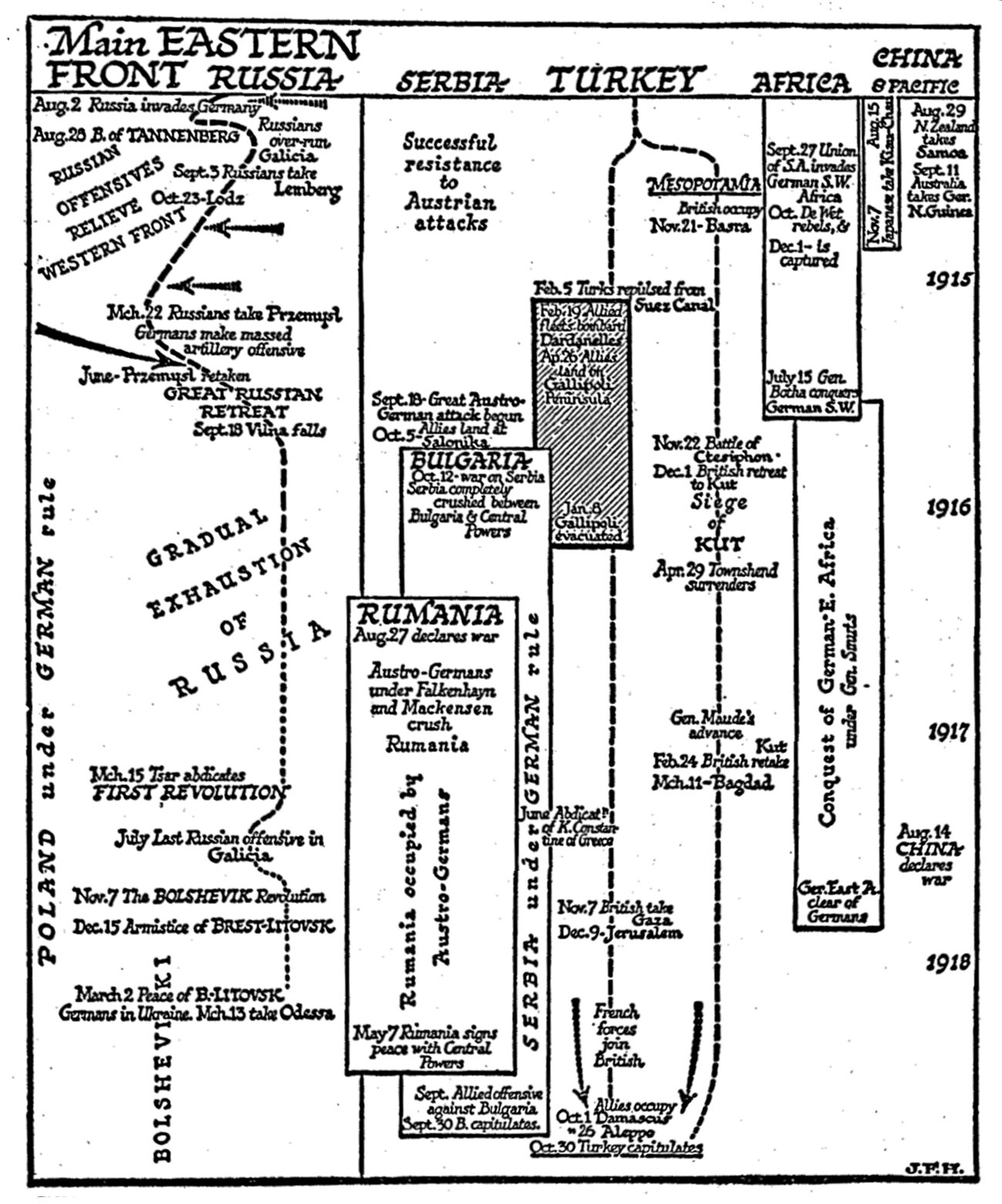
A timeline of events on the Eastern and Middle-Eastern theatres of World War I

== Central Powers ==
=== Germany ===
==== Eastern Front ====
While the Western Front was static, the fighting on the Eastern Front moved back and forth over hundreds of miles. There were decisive wins and defeats, led off by the military collapse of Russia after the failure of the Brusilov Offensive in 1916, and the political collapse in 1917. There were decisive victories against the Russian army, starting in 1914 the trapping and defeat of large parts of the Russian contingent at the Battle of Tannenberg, followed by huge Austrian and German successes. The breakdown of Russian forces – exacerbated by internal turmoil caused by the 1917 Russian Revolution – led to the Treaty of Brest-Litovsk the Bolsheviks were forced to sign on 3 March 1918 as Russia withdrew from the war. It gave Germany control of Eastern Europe.

==== Russia surrenders: the Treaty of Brest Litovsk ====
The Treaty of Brest-Litovsk was signed on 3 March 1918 between the new Bolshevik government of Soviet Russia and the Central Powers. Historian Spencer C. Tucker says, "The German General Staff had formulated extraordinarily harsh terms that shocked even the German negotiator."

Russia gave up all claims on Finland, Estonia, Latvia, Ukraine and Lithuania. Poland was not mentioned but it was taken over by Germany. A slice of territory was ceded to Turkey. Russia agreed to pay six billion German gold marks in reparations.

The treaty gave Germany multiple gains. Most important, it allowed the main forces in the East to the move to the Western front, where they outnumbered the Allies, since the Americans had not yet arrived in strength. Second and achieve the German war aims of controlling most of Eastern Europe. Third, it supposedly solved the desperate German food shortages, since Ukraine was the bread basket of Russia. As for Russia, the new Bolshevik government desperately needed to end the war with Germany to concentrate on its multiple civil wars trying to overthrow the new regime from the right.

However, Ukraine was so poorly organized that very little of the promised food was actually delivered to Germany. Though a strategic disaster from a military standpoint, Russia's exit from the war freed the Allied war effort of the diplomatic constraints imposed by the Tsar, including all promises made to Russia regarding post war territorial acquisitions. Further, the harsh terms of Brest-Litovsk proved to the Allies that there could be no negotiated peace with Germany and fighting would have to continue until it one side achieved clear victory. The treaty became a nullity when Germany signed the Armistice in November 1918. When Germany later complained that the Treaty of Versailles of 1919 was too harsh on them, the Allies responded that it was more benign than Brest-Litovsk.

==== Subversion of enemy states ====
At the start of the war, Germany expanded its unofficial propaganda machinery, establishing the Central Office for Foreign Services, which among other duties was tasked with propaganda distribution to neutral nations, persuading them to either side with Germany or to maintain their stance of neutrality. After the declaration of war, Britain immediately cut the undersea telegraph cables that connected Germany to the outside world, thereby cutting off a major propaganda outlet. The Germans relied instead on the powerful wireless Nauen Transmitter Station to broadcast pro-German news reports to the world. Among other techniques used to keep up the morale of the troops, mobile cinemas were regularly dispatched to the front line for the entertainment of the troops. Newsreels would portray current events with a pro-German slant. German propaganda techniques heavily relied on emphasising the mythological and martial nature of the Germanic 'Volk' and the inevitability of its triumph.

In December 1917 the German Foreign Minister Richard von Kühlmann explained the main goals of his diplomacy was now to subvert enemy states and make peace with breakaway states and thus undermine the political unity of the Entente:

The disruption of the Entente and the subsequent creation of political combinations agreeable to us constitute the most important war aim of our diplomacy. Russia appeared to be the weakest link in the enemy chain. The task, therefore, was gradually to loosen it, and, when possible, to remove it. This was the purpose of the subversive activity we caused to be carried out in Russia behind the front—in the first place promotion of separatist tendencies and support of the Bolsheviks. It was not until the Bolsheviks had received from us a steady flow of funds through various channels and under different labels that they were in a position to be able to build up their main organ, Pravda, to conduct energetic propaganda and appreciably to extend the originally narrow basis of their party. The Bolsheviks have now come to power; how long they will retain power cannot be yet foreseen. They need peace in order to strengthen their own position; on the other hand, it is entirely in our interest that we should exploit the period while they are in power, which may be a short one, in order to attain firstly an armistice and then, if possible, peace.

According to historian Ron Carden, the German Foreign Ministry's propaganda campaign in Spain included diplomats and subsidies to networks of businessmen and influential Spaniards with the goal of convincing Spain to remain neutral, which it did.

=== Austro-Hungarian Empire ===
The Austro-Hungarian Empire played a relatively passive diplomatic role in the war, as it was increasingly dominated and controlled by Germany. The only goal was to punish Serbia and try to stop the ethnic breakup of the Empire, and it completely failed. Instead, as the war went on the ethnic unity declined; the Allies encouraged breakaway demands from minorities and the Empire faced disintegration. Starting in late 1916 the new Emperor Charles I of Austria removed the pro-German officials and opened peace overtures to the Allies, whereby the entire war could be ended by compromise, or perhaps Austria would make a separate peace from Germany. The main effort was vetoed by Italy, which had been promised large slices of Austria for joining the Allies in 1915. Austria was only willing to turn over the Trentino region but nothing more. Although his foreign minister, Graf Czernin, was only interested in negotiating a general peace which would include Germany, Charles himself went much further in suggesting his willingness to make a separate peace. When news of the overture leaked in April 1918, Charles denied involvement until French Prime Minister Georges Clemenceau published letters signed by him. This led to Czernin's resignation, forcing Austria-Hungary into an even more dependent position with respect to its German ally. Emperor Charles was seen as a defeatist, which weakened his standing at home and with both the Allies and Germany.

As the Imperial economy collapsed into severe hardship and even starvation, its multi-ethnic Army lost its morale and was increasingly hard-pressed to hold its line. In the capital cities of Vienna and Budapest, the leftist and liberal movements and opposition parties strengthened and supported the separatism of ethnic minorities. As it became apparent that the Allies would win the war, nationalist movements, which had previously been calling for a greater degree of autonomy for their majority areas, started demanding full independence. The Emperor had lost much of his power to rule, as his realm disintegrated.

By summer 1918, "Green Cadres" of army deserters formed armed bands in the hills of Croatia-Slavonia and civil authority disintegrated. By late October violence and massive looting erupted and there were efforts to form peasant republics. However The Croatian political leadership was focused on creating a new state (Yugoslavia) and worked with the advancing Serbian army to impose control and end the uprisings.

Alexander Watson argues that "The Habsburg regime's doom was sealed when Wilson's response to the note sent two and a half weeks earlier arrived on 20 October." Wilson rejected the continuation of the dual monarchy as a negotiable possibility. As one of his Fourteen Points, President Woodrow Wilson demanded that "The peoples of Austria-Hungary, whose place among the nations we wish to see safeguarded and assured, should be accorded the freest opportunity to autonomous development." In response, Emperor Charles I agreed to reconvene the Imperial Parliament in 1917 and allow the creation of a confederation with each national group exercising self-governance. However the leaders of these national groups rejected the idea; they deeply distrusted Vienna and were now determined to get independence.

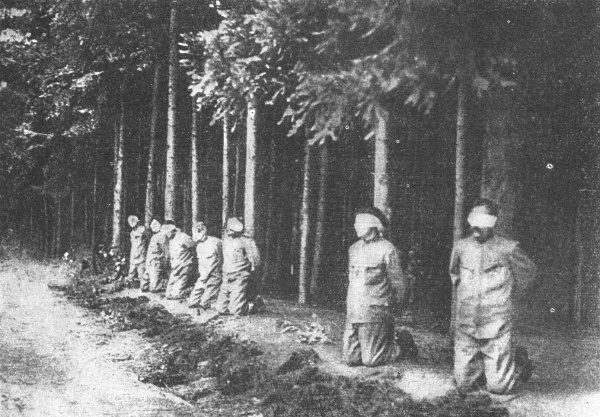
The revolt of ethnic Czech units in Austria in May 1918 was brutally suppressed. It was punished as mutiny.

On 14 October 1918, Foreign Minister Baron István Burián von Rajecz asked for an armistice based on the Fourteen Points. In an apparent attempt to demonstrate good faith, Emperor Charles issued a proclamation ("Imperial Manifesto of 16 October 1918") two days later which would have significantly altered the structure of the Austrian half of the monarchy. The Polish majority regions of Galicia and Lodomeria were to be granted the option of seceding from the empire, and it was understood that they would join their ethnic brethren in Russia and Germany in resurrecting a Polish state. The rest of Cisleithania was to be transformed into a federal union composed of four parts—German, Czech, South Slav and Ukrainian. Each of these was to be governed by a national council that would negotiate the future of the empire with Vienna and Trieste was to receive a special status. No such proclamation could be issued in Hungary, where Hungarian aristocrats still believed they could subdue other nationalities and maintain their rule.

Charles's proposal was a dead letter when on 18 October U.S. Secretary of State Robert Lansing replied that the Allies were now committed to the causes of the Czechs, Slovaks and South Slavs. Therefore, Lansing said, autonomy for the nationalities was no longer enough. Charles's last Hungarian prime minister, Mihály Károlyi, terminated the personal union with Austria on 31 October, officially dissolving the Austro-Hungarian state. By the end of October, there was nothing left of the Habsburg realm but its majority-German Danubian and Alpine provinces, and Charles's authority was being challenged even there by the German-Austrian state council.

=== Ottoman Empire (Turkey) ===
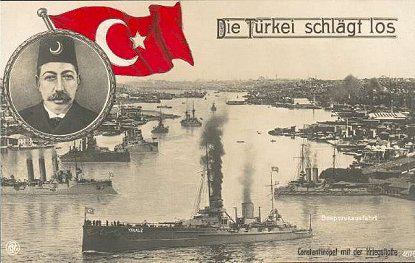
A German postcard of the Ottoman Navy early in the war. The caption reads "Turkey gets going". The portrait shows Sultan Mehmed V.

The Ottoman Empire (often referred to as Turkey) in 1914 had a population of about 25 million including 14 million Turks and large numbers of Arabs, Armenians, Greeks, and other minorities. Known as the "sick man of Europe", by 1914, the once mighty Ottoman Empire had fallen far behind the West both economically and militarily. In the two decades proceeding, the Ottomans suffered multiple humiliating defeats at the hands of European nations and by 1913 had lost all of its holdings in North Africa and had been driven out of Europe entirely save Eastern Thrace. Despite attempts at reform, the Ottoman economy remained heavily traditional, but with a strong German influence in terms of modernization, especially building railways. In 1914 the Ottoman government in Constantinople took the initiative in supporting the Central Powers (see German–Ottoman alliance). Its Army already was under German guidance, especially by General Otto Liman von Sanders. The British expected the alliance with Germany and seized two dreadnoughts under construction that had been paid for by the Ottomans. Negotiations with the Allies went nowhere after the Turks demanded very large concessions. Instead, a secret alliance was made with Germany in early August, with promises of regaining territory lost to Russia, Greece and Serbia in earlier wars. In the Pursuit of Goeben and Breslau, two German warships fled to Constantinople for safety at the start of the war. Despite their German crews, they were officially enrolled in the Turkish Navy and followed the Sultan's orders. They attacked Russian ports on the Black Sea in October 1914; that led in a few days to mutual declarations of war.

German General Erich Ludendorff stated in his memoirs that he believed the entry of the Turks into the war allowed the outnumbered Central Powers to fight on for two years longer than they would have been able on their own, a view shared by historian Ian F. W. Beckett.

The Turks fought the war on multiple fronts: against Russia on the Black Sea and eastern Turkey and the Russian Caucasus; against Britain in Mesopotamia (Iraq) and Sinai and Palestine in 1917; and against the combined Allied forces at Gallipoli, near the approaches to Constantinople.

The British engaged in secret peace talks with Ottoman representatives in Switzerland in 1917–1918, on the basis of autonomy for the non-Turkish areas. The Turkish leadership was internally divided and could not agree on any peace terms. The British wanted to wait until they conquered more Ottoman territory and no agreement was reached.

The Arab Revolt which began in 1916 turned the tide against the Ottomans on the Middle Eastern front, where they initially seemed to have the upper hand during the first two years of the war. The Armistice of Mudros was signed on 30 October 1918, and set the partition of the Ottoman Empire under the terms of the Treaty of Sèvres. This treaty, as designed in the conference of London, allowed the Sultan to retain his position and title. The occupation of Constantinople and İzmir sparked the rise of a Turkish national movement, which won the Turkish War of Independence (1919–1923) under the leadership of Mustafa Kemal (later given the surname "Atatürk"). The sultanate was abolished on 1 November 1922, and the last sultan, Mehmed VI (reigned 1918–1922), left the country on 17 November 1922. The caliphate was abolished on 3 March 1924.

==== Armenian genocide ====
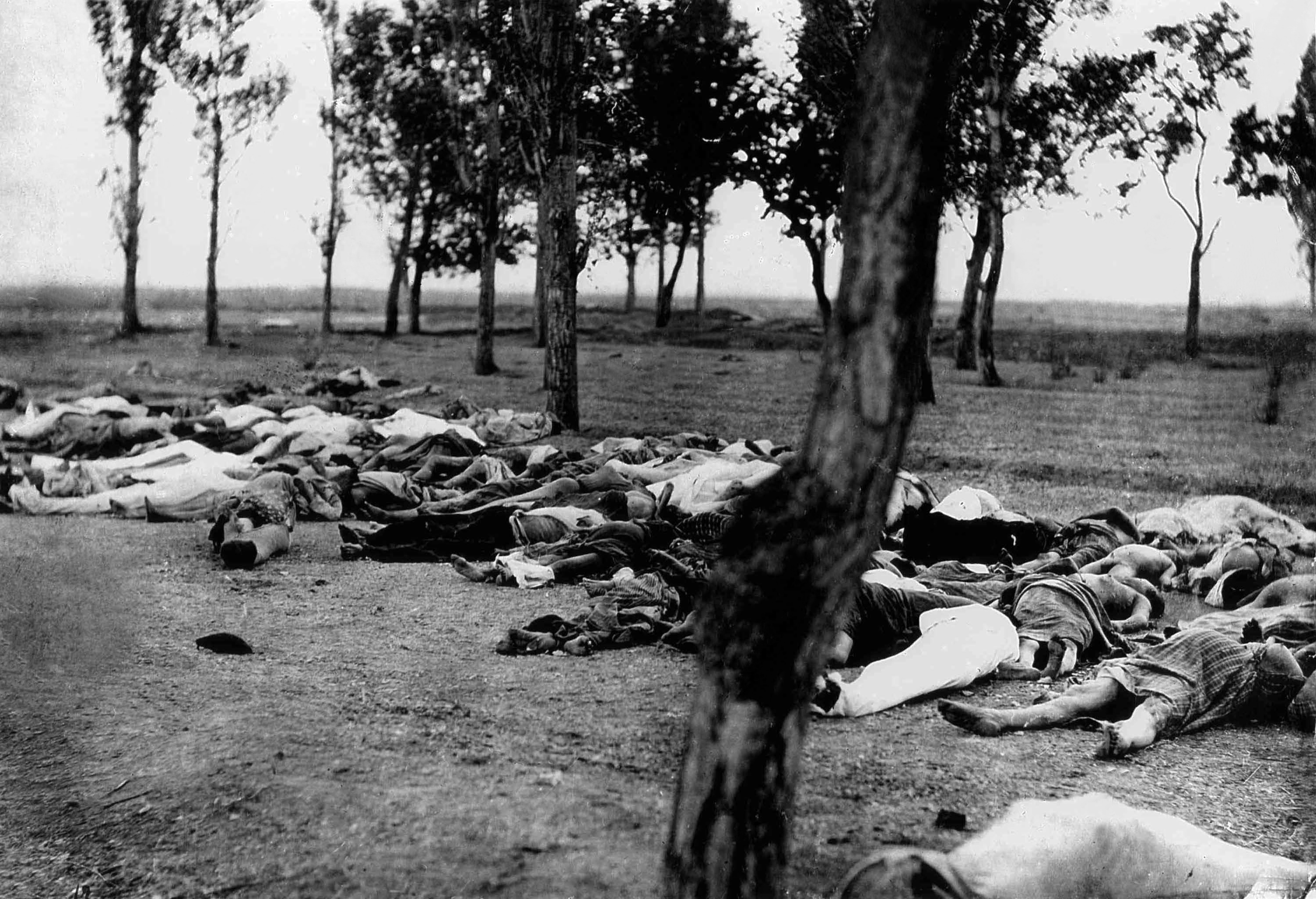
The Armenian Genocide was the Ottoman government's systematic extermination of its Armenian subjects. The number of dead reached perhaps 1.5 million.

The Armenian genocide was the deliberate and systematic mass murder of ethnic Armenians by the Ottoman government. In 1915, as the Russian Caucasus Army continued to advance into its eastern provinces, the Ottoman military began the ethnic cleansing of the region's large historic Armenian population. The genocide was implemented in two phases: the wholesale killing of able-bodied Armenian males through massacre and subjection as army conscripts to forced labour, followed by the deportation of women, children, the elderly, and the infirm on death marches to the Syrian desert. Driven forward by military escorts, the deportees were deprived of food and water and subjected to periodic robbery, rape, and murder. The diplomatic dimension considered here was the diplomatic response of Allied powers. Ottoman officials denied any massacre, and their German allies helped cover for them. Allied governments tried diplomacy to stop the genocide but were ignored.

On 24 May 1915 the Allies issued a joint public denunciation of the "mass murders" of the Armenians, denouncing a new "crime against humanity and civilization", for which all guilty parties would be held personally responsible after the war. The victors brought the matter to the Paris Peace Conference in 1919. It did not follow-up. Some high officials were put on trial by the new Ottoman government, and condemned to death in absentia the top leaders who were then in exile. The Treaty of Lausanne of 1923 granted amnesty to the rest of the perpetrators.

=== Bulgaria ===
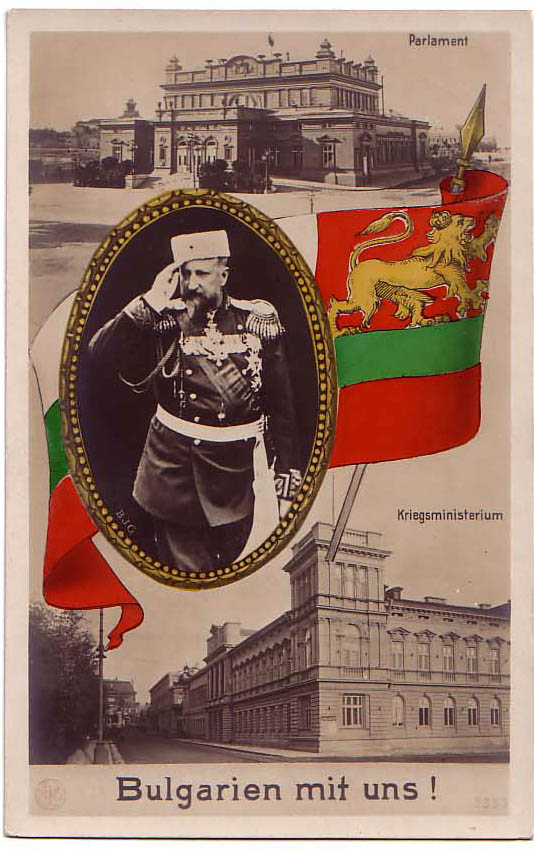
A German postcard welcoming the entry of Bulgaria into the war and showing Bulgaria's Tsar Ferdinand

In the aftermath of its defeat and limited territorial gains in the Balkan Wars, Bulgaria felt betrayed and turned against its former ally Russia. Bulgaria in 1914–15 was neutral. In 1915 Germany and Austria realized they needed Bulgaria's help in order to defeat Serbia militarily thereby opening supply lines from Germany to Turkey and bolstering the Eastern Front against Russia. In return for war, Bulgaria insisted on major territorial gains, especially Macedonia, which Austria was reluctant to grant until Berlin insisted. Bulgaria also negotiated with the Allies, who offered less generous terms. In 1915 the government of liberal prime minister Vasil Radoslavov therefore aligned Bulgaria with the Central Powers even though this meant becoming an ally of the Ottomans, Bulgaria's traditional political and religious enemy. While Bulgaria now had no land claims against the Ottomans, it resented Serbia, Greece and Romania for seizing lands the Bulgarians believed rightfully belonged to them. Bulgaria signed an alliance with Germany and Austria in September 1915, the terms of which envisioned a postwar Balkans that would be dominated by Bulgaria.

Although the Bulgarian army was militarily successful in 1915–1917, its effectiveness collapsed in the summer of 1918. Morale dropped due to shortages of food at home and munitions at the frontlines. As war weariness grew so did both distrust of German intentions amongst by the Bulgarian hierarchy and average citizen. Soldiers felt betrayed by protracted conflict and many resented fighting their fellow Orthodox Christians in and alliance with Muslim Ottomans. By 1918 the Bulgarian leadership had lost the support of the people. The Russian Revolution of February 1917 crystallized many of the resentments present in Bulgaria and anti-war and anti-monarchist sentiment soon spread. In June 1918 Radoslavov's government resigned. In September 1918, the Allies invaded with 29 divisions and 700,000 troops. The Bulgarian lines were quickly overrun. Tsar Ferdinand abdicated, the army mutinied and a republic was proclaimed. The new Bulgarian government capitulated in the face of the Allied advance, almost agreeing to an armistice. The Ottoman Empire was now geographically disconnected from the remaining Central Powers and it too soon collapsed, agreeing to an armistice themselves on 30 October. Allied forces in the east Mediterranean could now turn their entire momentum north towards Austria-Hungary. Disintegrating both militarily and internally, the Austrians accepted the inevitable and agreed to an armistice on 3 November 1918. On 8 November, in the hope of mitigating their postwar position as best as possible, Bulgaria reentered the war on the Allied side, declaring war on Germany. However it proved to be too late. Germany, now alone without allies, surrendered on 14 November 1918, ending the war. A year later, Bulgaria was forced by the Allies to sign the Treaty of Neuilly-sur-Seine. The terms of the treaty ending the war between Bulgaria and the Allies were very harsh: Bulgaria was stripped of even more territory, including access to the Mediterranean through ports on the Aegean. Bulgaria ultimately retained virtually none of the land it had fought so hard to gain in the First Balkan War. Bulgaria's debt to Germany, including money conveyed in order to fund the war effort, was cancelled at Paris. However this relief paled in comparison to the crippling £100 million war indemnity the Allies imposed; such an amount was far beyond the realistic financial capabilities of what was by now a deeply impoverished nation.

== New nations ==
=== Poland ===
Poland for a century had been split between Russia, Austria, and Germany. It was the scene of numerous battles, most of which were defeats for Russia. Historian M. B. Biskupski argues that Poles tried to influence international diplomacy in several ways. In 1914–1916, they appealed to popular sympathy for the plight of suffering civilians, and forced onto the agenda the "Polish Question" (that is, creating an independent Poland). Efforts to bring food relief failed. Both sides needed Polish soldiers, and had to make promises to get them. In 1918, Polish independence was promoted by both sides as proof of their morally superior vision for the postwar world. Polish nationalists gained political leverage when offered promises of concessions and future autonomy in exchange for Polish loyalty and army recruits. Russia recognized Polish autonomy and allowed formation of the Polish National Committee, which supported the Allied side. Russia's foreign Minister Sergei Sazonov proposed to create an autonomous Kingdom of Poland with its own internal administration, religious freedom and Polish language used in schools and administration; Roman Dmowski tried to persuade the Allies to unify the Polish lands under Russian rule as an initial step toward independence.

Meanwhile, in Germany Józef Piłsudski formed the Polish Legions to assist the Central Powers in defeating Russia as the first step toward full independence for Poland. Berlin vaguely proposed creation of puppet state, called Kingdom of Poland (1917–18), while planning to ethnically cleanse millions of Poles to make room for German colonists in Polish Border Strip plan. When the Bolsheviks took power in late 1917, they effectively surrendered control of Eastern Europe to the Germans. The Allies were now free of promises to Russia, and the entry of the United States into the war enabled President Wilson to transform the war into a crusade to spread democracy and liberate the Poles. The thirteenth of his Fourteen Points adopted the resurrection of Poland as one of the main aims of the war. Polish opinion crystallized in support of the Allied cause. Józef Piłsudski Rejected the Germans. In October 1918, Poles took control of Galicia and Cieszyn Silesia. In November 1918, Piłsudski returned to Warsaw. and took control over the newly created state as its provisional Chief of State. Soon all the local governments that had been created in the last months of the war pledged allegiance to the central government in Warsaw. Poland now controlled Privislinsky Krai, western Galicia (with Lwów besieged by the Ukrainians) and part of Cieszyn Silesia.

=== Ukraine ===
Unlike Poland, Ukraine did not have the world's attention. There were few Ukrainians living in the United States and Wilson largely ignored the issues. The Ukrainians in exile nevertheless managed to overcome bitter internal disputes, and set up a Ukrainian National Rada and, after several schisms, a Ukrainian national Committee. It sent representatives to the Peace Conference in Paris and carried on much relief and informational work. The most active lobbying work dealt with the Ottoman Empire, but it was in no position to play a major role. The Ukraine National Republic proclaimed its independence on 22 January 1918. It was recognized by Russia, Great Britain and France, and it sent delegates to Brest-Litovsk to claim recognition from Germany and the Central Powers, who granted this in February 1918. From its inception independent Ukraine had only a tenuous existence as it was intrinsically unstable, never in full control of its territory, and threatened by enemies from without and within. Historian Orest Subtelny outlines the confused situation:

In 1919 total chaos engulfed Ukraine. Indeed, in the modern history of Europe no country experienced such complete anarchy, bitter civil strife, and total collapse of authority as did Ukraine at this time. Six different armies—those of the Ukrainians, the Bolsheviks, the Whites, the Entente [French], the Poles and the anarchists – operated on its territory. Kiev changed hands five times in less than a year. Cities and regions were cut off from each other by the numerous fronts. Communications with the outside world broke down almost completely. The starving cities emptied as people moved into the countryside in their search for food.

Britain saw Ukraine as a German puppet during the war. At the Paris Peace Conference in 1919, British prime minister David Lloyd George called Ukrainian leader Symon Petliura (1874–1926) an adventurer and dismissed his legitimacy. By 1922 Poland took control of western Ukraine, and Bolshevik Russia took control of eastern Ukraine.

=== Three Baltic states ===
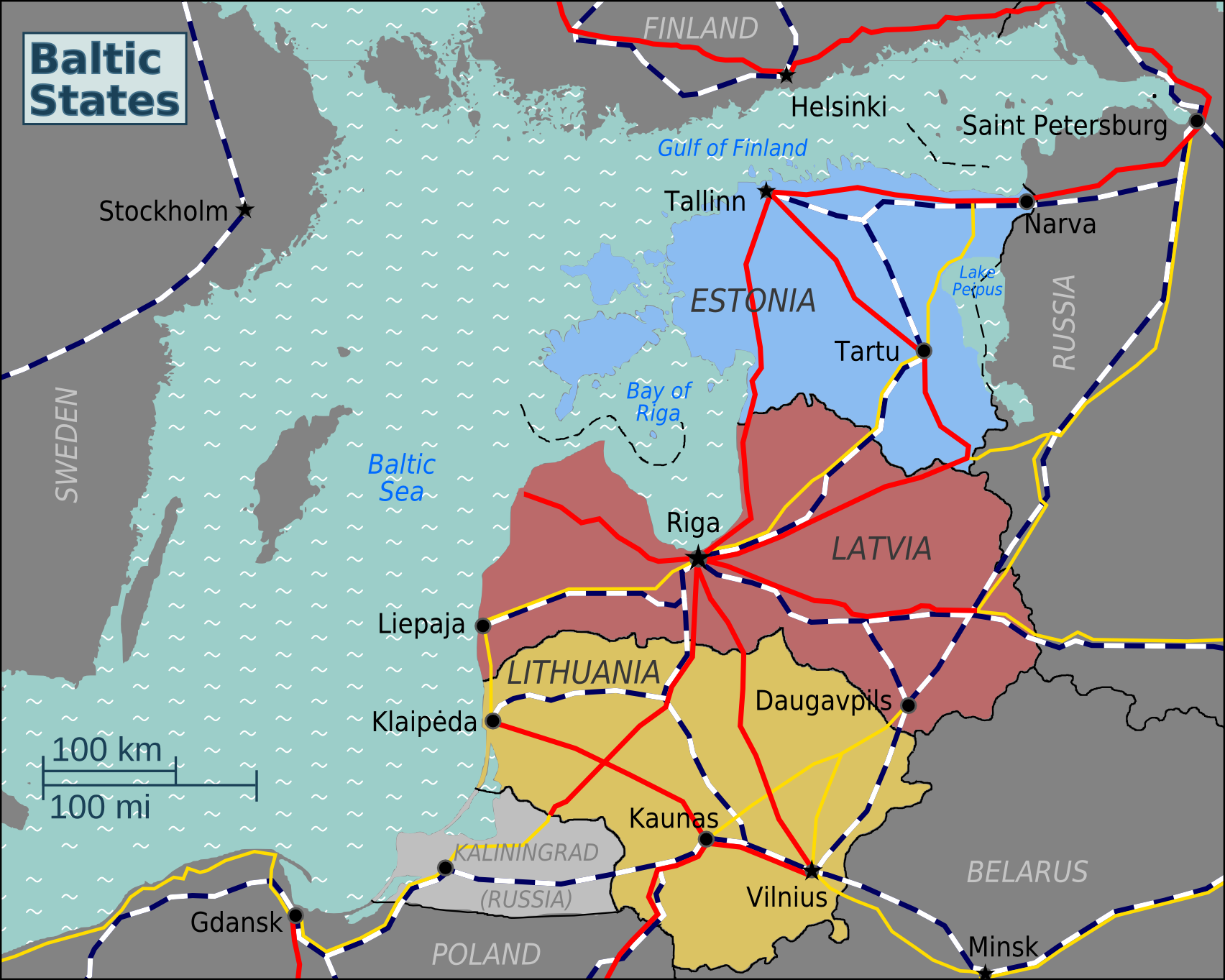
Baltic region with railroads and main roads

The Baltic region from Lithuania in the south, Latvia in the center and Estonia in the north were parts of the Russian Empire. A sense of nationalism emerged after the revolution of 1905 and February 1917 in Russia. By October 1917, the demand had moved from autonomy to independence. In 1915–1917, Germany invaded from South to North and imposed military rule. Great armies marched back and forth—Riga, Latvia went through seven regime changes. Across the three states there were attacks on civilians, deportations, scorched earth campaigns, and concentration camps. Hundreds of thousands of people fled as refugees in Russia as far away as Vladivostok in eastern Siberia. Local nationalists and Bolsheviks tried repeatedly to take control in the chaos. Bolsheviks controlled Latvia as the Iskolat regime and as the Latvian Socialist Soviet Republic in 1917 until they were driven out in May 1919. Bolsheviks also controlled Estonia until forced out by the Germans in early 1918. The Red Army of Soviet Russia invaded all three states in December 1918 to January 1919. However they were driven out by August 1919 by local forces aided by Finland. Peace treaties between the Soviets and the three Baltic states were finalized in 1920, and they remained independent until 1940.

A portion of southern Lithuania around Vilnius became the Republic of Central Lithuania in 1920–1922. It was a puppet state controlled by Poland, and was absorbed into Poland in 1922. Poland's seizure of Vilnius made normal relations with Lithuania impossible.

=== Czechoslovakia ===
A Czechoslovak provisional government had joined the Allies on 14 October 1917. The South Slavs in both halves of the monarchy had already declared in favor of uniting with Serbia in a large South Slav state by way of the 1917 Corfu Declaration signed by members of the Yugoslav Committee, and the Croatians had begun disregarding orders from Budapest earlier in October.

The American rejection of Emperor Charles's last-minute proposal for a federal union was the death certificate of Austria-Hungary. The national councils had already begun acting more or less as provisional governments of independent countries. With defeat in the war imminent, Czech politicians peacefully took over command in Prague on 28 October (later celebrated as the birthday of Czechoslovakia) and followed up in other major cities in the next few days. On 30 October, the Slovaks followed in Martin. On the 29 October, the Slavs in both portions of what remained of Austria-Hungary proclaimed the State of Slovenes, Croats and Serbs. They also declared their ultimate intention was to unite with Serbia and Montenegro in a large South Slav state that in 1929 was renamed Yugoslavia. On the same day, the Czechs and Slovaks formally proclaimed the establishment of Czechoslovakia as an independent state.

== See also ==
- Color books, transcripts of official documents released by each nation early in the war
- Causes of World War I
  - Historiography of the causes of World War I
  - American entry into World War I
  - Austro-Hungarian entry into World War I
  - British entry into World War I
  - French entry into World War I
  - German entry into World War I
  - Italian entry into World War I
  - Japanese entry into World War I
  - Ottoman entry into World War I
  - Russian entry into World War I
- Revolutions of 1917–1923
- Treaty of Brest-Litovsk
- Treaty of Versailles
- World War I reparations
- International relations of the Great Powers (1814–1919)
- International relations (1919–1939)
- Aftermath of World War I
- Interwar period
- Minority Treaties, protecting minorities in new nations post 1919
- Allies of World War I
- Central Powers
- Home front during World War I, covering all major countries involved
  - Belgium in World War I
  - History of France during World War I
  - Economic history of World War I, covers major countries
  - History of Germany during World War I
  - British home front during the First World War
  - United States home front during World War I
