= Belgian government at Sainte-Adresse =

Belgian governments in exile during World War I

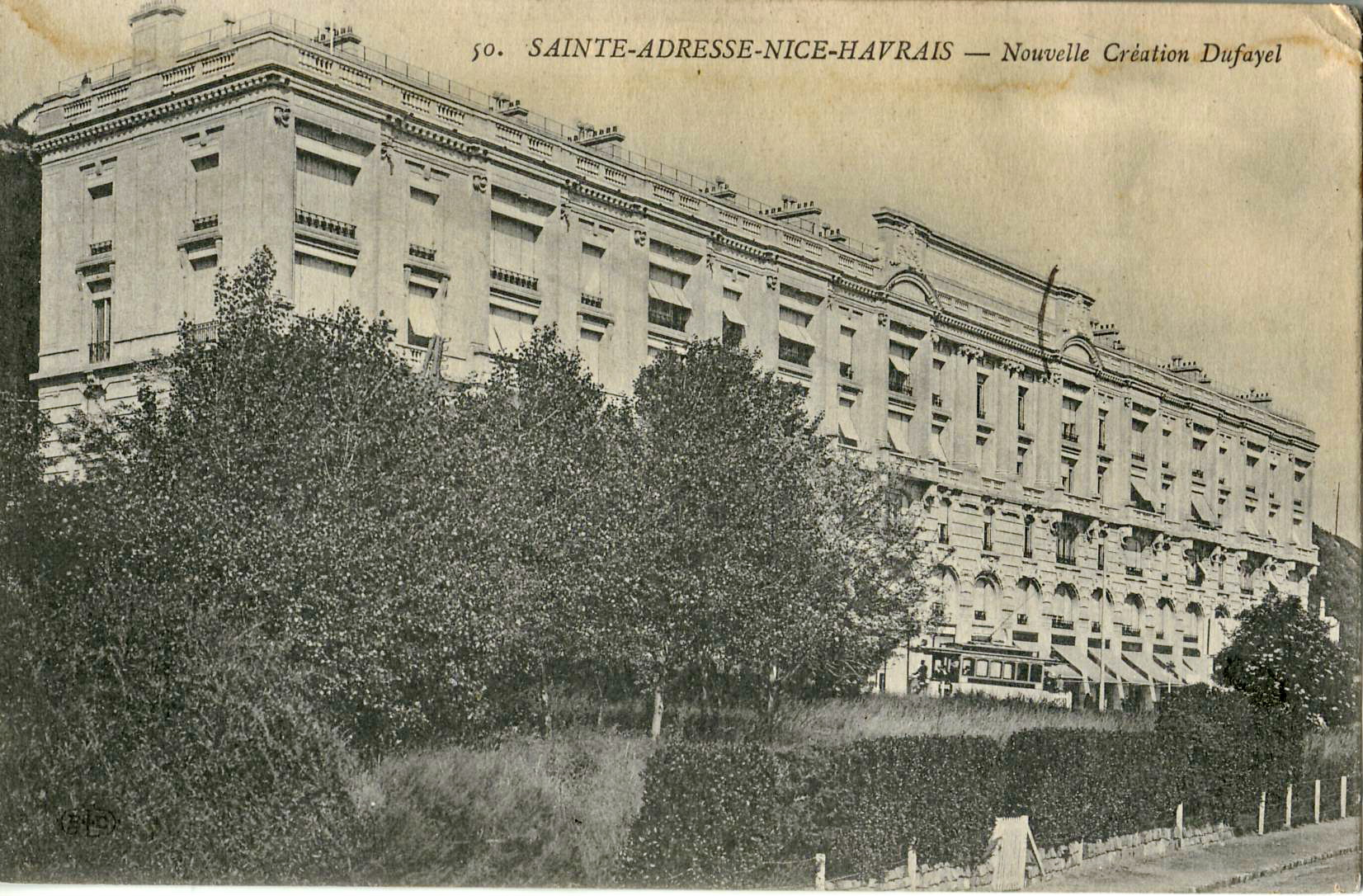
The Immeuble Dufayel in Sainte-Adresse where the government sat between 1914 and 1918.

The De Broqueville government in Sainte-Adresse refers to two successive Belgian governments, led by Charles de Broqueville, which served as governments in exile during the German occupation of Belgium in World War I. They were based in Le Havre in northern France after October 1914. The first government, known as the First de Broqueville government, was a Catholic government which was elected in 1911 and continued until 1916, when it was joined by Socialists and Liberals expanding it into the Second de Broqueville government, which lasted until 1 June 1918. In November 1914, the vast majority of Belgian territory (2,598 out of 2,636 communes) was under German occupation. The only portion of Belgium that remained controlled by the Kingdom of Belgium in exile was the strip of territory behind the Yser Front.

== Exile in Le Havre ==
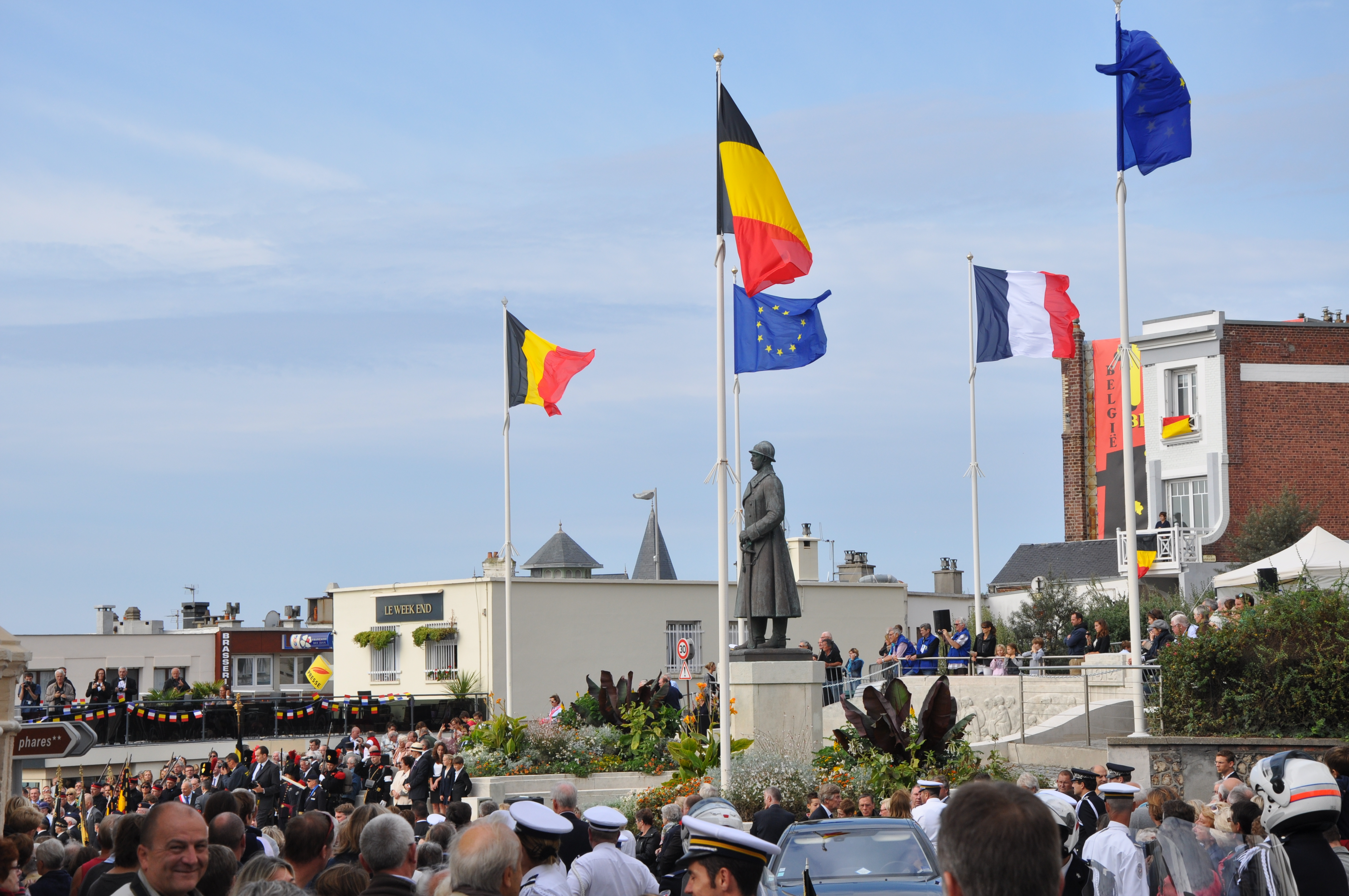
2014 October, centenary in Le Havre - Sainte-Adresse.

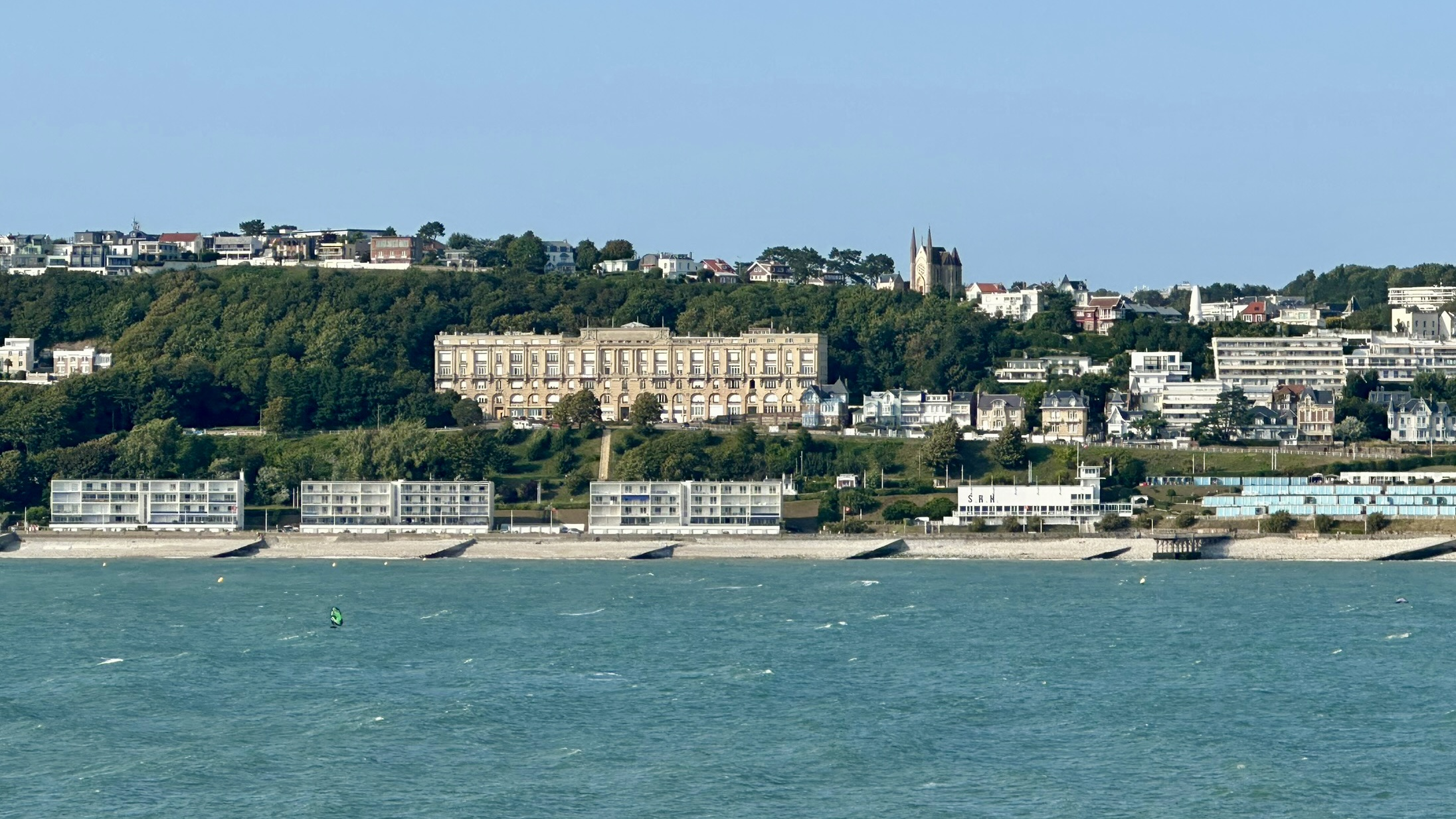
Immeuble Dufayel in 2025

In October 1914, the government moved to the French coastal city of Le Havre. It was established in the large Immeuble Dufayel ("Dufayel Building"), built by the French businessman Georges Dufayel in 1911, situated in the suburb of Sainte-Adresse. The whole area of Sainte-Adresse, which still carries the national colours of Belgium on its shield, was leased to Belgium by the French government as a temporary administrative centre while the rest of Belgium was occupied. The area had a sizeable Belgian émigré population, and even used Belgian postage stamps.

King Albert I considered that it was inappropriate for the King to leave his own country and so did not join his government in Le Havre. Instead, he established his staff in the Flemish town of Veurne, just behind the Yser Front, in the last strip of unoccupied Belgian territory.

== Composition ==
The de Broqueville government comprised:

- Baron Charles de Broqueville (Catholic) as Prime Minister (known as chef du cabinet until November 1918).
- Henry Carton de Wiart (Catholic), Minister of Justice
- Julien Davignon (Catholic), Minister of Foreign Affairs until 18 January 1916
- Paul Berryer (Catholic), Minister of the Interior
- Prosper Poullet (Catholic), Minister of Arts and Sciences, as well as Minister for Economic Affairs after 1 January 1918
- Aloys Van de Vyvere (Catholic), Minister of Finance
- Georges Helleputte (Catholic), Minister of Agriculture and Public Works
- Armand Hubert (Catholic), Minister of Industry and Work
- Paul Segers (Catholic), Minister of Railways, the Marine, and the PTT
- Armand De Ceuninck (technocrat), Minister of War after 4 August 1917
- Jules Renkin (Catholic), Minister of the Colonies
- Baron Eugène Beyens (technocrat), member of the Council of Ministers after 30 July 1916; Minister of Foreign Affairs between 18 January 1916 to 4 August 1917
- Paul Hymans (Liberal), member of the Council of Ministers after 18 January 1916; Minister of Economic Affairs from 12 November 1917 to 1 January 1918; Minister of Foreign Affairs after 1 January 1918.
- Count Eugène Goblet d'Alviella (Liberal), member of the Council of Ministers after 18 January 1916
- Emile Vandervelde (Socialist), member of the Council of Ministers after 18 January 1916; Minister of Supplies after 4 August 1917
- Emile Brunet (Socialist), member of the Council of Ministers after 1 January 1918.

== Criticism ==
The Flamingant poet René de Clercq published a poem called Aan Die Van Havere ("To those of Le Havre") in 1916, in which he accused the government (the "Lords of Le Havre") of having forgotten the plight of Flanders.

== See also ==
- Declaration of Sainte-Adresse
