= Georges Dwelshauvers =

Belgian philosopher and psychologist (1866–1937)

Georges Dwelshauvers, who also wrote under the pseudonym Georges Mesnil (1866–1937) was a Belgian philosopher and psychologist. He was the brother of the art critic and anarchist Jacques Mesnil.

Dwelshauvers studied philosophy at the Université libre de Bruxelles before studying in Germany, where he was attracted to the new experimental psychology of Wilhelm Wundt. His attempt to submit a psychological thesis for a Brussels doctorate was blocked by Guillaume Tiberghien (1819–1901) in what became known as the Dwelshauvers affair, and Dwelshauvers only started lecturing in philosophy after Tiberghien's retirement.

In a series of articles between 1905 and 1908 Dwelshauvers criticised Henri Bergson's reliance on qualitative intuition for the study of psychological phenomena. He also wrote for a range of literary magazines, including La Société Nouvelle and the Flemish publication Van Nu en Straks [Today and Tomorrow], edited by his brother. Introduced by August Vermeylen to the thought of Friedrich Nietzsche, he played an important role in the reception of Nietzsche in France and Belgium.

Dwelshauvers was director of a psychology laboratory in Barcelona from 1920 to 1924.

== Works ==
- Les méthodes de l'idéalisme scientifique, 1892
- La synthèse mentale, 1908
- La philosophy de Nietzsche, Paris, 1909
- L'inconscient, 1916
- La psychologie francaise contemporaine, Paris: Alcan, 1920
- Les mécanismes subconscients, 1925
- La Catalogne et le problème catalan, 1926
- Traité de psychologie, 1928
- Vues sur la psychologie animale, 1930
- L'étude de la pensée; méthodes et résultats, 1934
- L'exercice de la volonté, 1935
