= Jacques Mesnil =

Belgian journalist and art critic (1872–1940)

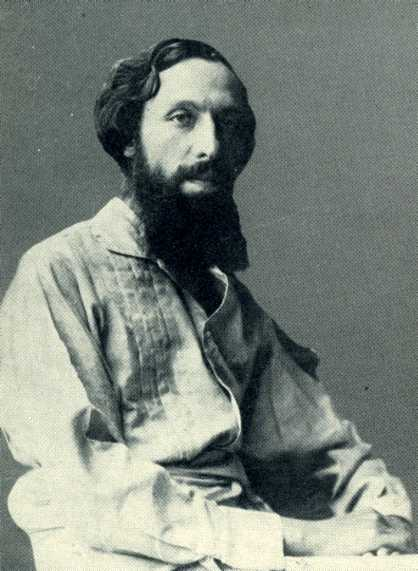
An early, altered photograph of Mesnil (date unknown)

Jean-Jacques Dwelshauvers, who went by the name of Jacques Mesnil (9 July 1872, Brussels – 14 November 1940, Montmaur-en-Diois) was a Belgian journalist, art critic, art historian and anarchist.

== Biography ==
=== 1872–1918 ===
Dwelshauvers' father was a high official for the city of Brussels and his mother frequented intellectual society. He studied at the grammar school in Brussels, where he befriended August Vermeylen. He later attended the University of Brussels, where he studied medicine and the classics.

In 1894, he published a history of art under the name "J. Mesnil". That same year saw great turmoil over the appointment of Élisée Reclus, an anarchist and former communard, to a geography chair at the university. Meanwhile, Mesnil had already left for Italy where he continued his medical studies in Bologna and came into contact with Errico Malatesta.

Mesnil contributed to the periodical Van Nu en Straks. He was such an avid supporter of "free love" that he broke off his friendship with Vermeylen when the latter married in 1897. A later dispute over the licentiousness of an article that Mesnil submitted to the journal led to a further breakup and, eventually, the end of the journal.

He returned to Italy to receive his medical degree, but never practiced. He remained in Florence, pursuing historical studies. While there, he met his future wife Clara Koettlitz (a colleague of Reclus) and befriended Aby Warburg.

In 1906, he settled in France, where he pursued his research on art history and became a friend of Romain Rolland. In 1914, shocked by the invasion of Belgium and what he saw as the defection of many pacifists and anarchists to the Union Sacrée, he became a contributor to L'Humanité and later expressed his admiration for the Russian Revolution.

=== 1918–1940 ===
After the war, he became increasingly involved in communist activities, joining the French Section of the Workers' International. In 1921, he went to Moscow to attend the third meeting of the Comintern, where he met Victor Serge. Nevertheless, he remained at odds with the Bolshevik dictatorship and was especially disturbed by the Kronstadt rebellion and its aftermath. He eventually drifted away from Bolshevism and became associated with the syndicalist movement of Pierre Monatte.

For many years, he labored to produce a book that would cover all of Tuscan history during the time of Botticelli. It was eventually completed and published in 1938 and is now considered to be the definitive work on that artist and period.

When the Nazis invaded France, Mesnil fled to a monastery to seek refuge. There, in the words of Fritz Saxl, he "died as a refugee...on a bed of straw". His death came almost exactly a year after the death of his wife, Clara, and it is unclear whether he died a natural death or committed suicide.

== Selected writings ==
- (in French) L'éducation des peintres florentins au XVe siècle, Revue des Idées, 15 September 1910, p. 195-206.
- (in French) L'art au nord et au sud des Alpes à l'époque de la Renaissance : études comparatives, Brussels, G. van Oest et cie., 1911. Reprinted by BiblioLife (2009) ISBN 1-1104-9314-2
- (in French) Italie du Nord: Piedmont, Liguria, Lombardy, Venetia, Emilia, Tuscany, Paris, Hachette, 1916.
- (in French) Masaccio et les débuts de la renaissance, La Haye, M. Nijhoff, 1927.
- (in French) Frans Masereel, Berkeley Heights, NJ, Printed Privately by the Oriole Pr., 1934 (Excerpted from, Ishill, Joseph. Free Vistas: an Anthology of Life & Letters. vol. 1. Berkeley Heights, NJ, Oriole Press, 1933).
- (in French) Botticelli, Paris, A. Michel, 1938.
- (in French) Raphael, Paris, Les Éditions Braun, 1943?.

== See also ==
- Georges Dwelshauvers

== Sources cited ==
- (in French) Cuenot, Alain. Clarté : 1919-1924 : Tome I. Du pacifisme a l'internationalisme proletarien, Paris, L'Harmattan, 2011 ISBN 978-2-296-55496-2, p. 54.
- (in Dutch) De Backer, Franz, and Paul De Smaele. "Beknopte levensschets van Aug. Vermeylen", August Vermeylen : Verzameld werk. Deel I (ed. Herman Teirlinck et al.), Brussels, A. Manteau, 1952, p. 29.
- (in English) "Dwelshauvers, Jean Jacques, Mesnil, Jacques, pseudonym ", Dictionary of Art Historians, (online), retrieved 7 August 2013, [arthistorians.info].
- (in French) Panné, Jean-Louis. "L'affaire Victor Serge : le mouvement communiste international et ses oppositions: 1920-1940", Communisme. Revue d'études pluridisciplinaires, Paris, Éditions L'Âge d'Homme, 1984, p. 103.
- (in Dutch) Rutten, Mathieu. "II. Voorgeschiedenis van Van Nu en Straks 1888-1893. D. Van Nu en Straks in zicht 1888-1893", Van Arm Vlaanderen tot De voorstad groeit. De opbloei van de Vlaamse literatuur van Teirlinck-Stijns tot L.P. Boon (1888-1946) (ed. Jean Weisgerber and Mathieu Rutten), Anvers, Standaard Uitgeverij, 1988, p. 59.
- (in Dutch) Van Istendael, Geert. "August Vermeylen en de anarchie", Dietsche Warande en Belfort, 138e année, Louvain, Éd. Peeters, 1993, p. 425.
- (in Dutch) Vervliet, Raymond. "II. Van Nu en Straks 1893-1901. A. Externe geschiedenis van Van Nu en Straks", Van Arm Vlaanderen tot De voorstad groeit. De opbloei van de Vlaamse literatuur van Teirlinck-Stijns tot L.P. Boon (1888-1946) (ed. Jean Weisgerber and Mathieu Rutten), Anvers, Standaard Uitgeverij, 1988, p. 88, 92–93.
