= Heritage registers in Belgium =

Cultural property of Belgium

Emblem of the International Committee of the Blue Shield for marking protected objects per the Hague Convention of 1954.

Heritage registers in Belgium include immovable heritage such as World Heritage Sites, and National heritage sites, but also intangible cultural heritage. The agency responsible for keeping and updating inventories of immovable heritage is dependent on the region, as is the name for the object, which is called Beschermd erfgoed, Biens classés or Kulturdenkmal depending on the language of the municipality of the location.

== Three National heritage organizations ==
Three administrative districts of Belgium: Flanders in the North, Wallonia in the South, and Brussels in the middle

In 1835 the Commission royale des monuments et des sites (Royal committee for monuments and sites) was created to advise the government on conservation and historic preservation. This committee was split in 1968 into a Flanders committee (Koninklijke Commissie voor Monumenten en Landschappen) and a Wallonian committee, and in 1993 a third committee was formed to administer the area of Brussels.

== Walloon region ==
In the Walloon region, the organization of the European Heritage Days and the classification of objects is done by the Agence wallonne du Patrimoine (AWaP)

=== East Belgium ===
The German-speaking Community of Belgium, part of the area known as "East Belgium" also hosts the European Heritage Days, and calls them "Tage des offenen Denkmals". The heritage protection of East Belgium falls under the jurisdiction of Liège province.

- Lists of protected heritage sites in the German-speaking Community of Belgium

=== Heritage lists of Wallonia ===
- Lists of protected heritage sites in Hainaut (province)
- Lists of protected heritage sites in Liège (province)
- Lists of protected heritage sites in Luxembourg (Belgium)
- Lists of protected heritage sites in Namur (province)
- Lists of protected heritage sites in Walloon Brabant

== Flanders ==
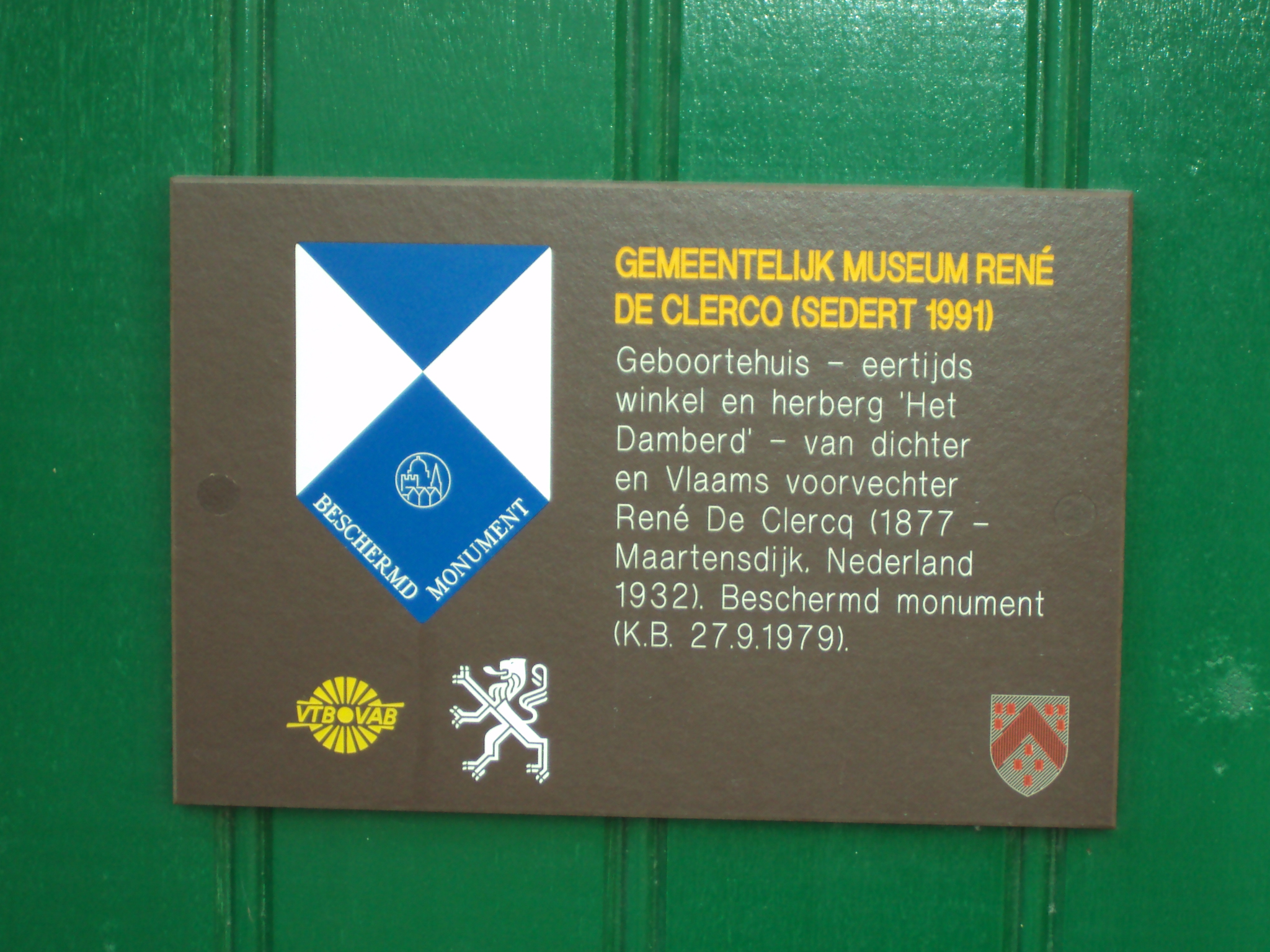
Beschermd erfgoed plaque on the museum of René de Clercq's birthplace in Deerlijk. On the left, the blue & white logo has the overlaid text "Beschermd Monument". Below that are the logo of the Flemish tourist bureau, the white lion of Flanders and bottom right, the flag of the town of Deerlijk.

One agency, the Flemish organization for Immovable Heritage and three of its subdivisions are responsible for protection; the VIOE, the Organization for KCML. Ruimte en Erfgoed, Onroerend Erfgoed, and the agent for inspection, the RWO.

=== Heritage lists of Flanders ===
- Lists of immovable heritage sites in Antwerp (province)
- Lists of immovable heritage sites in Limburg (Belgium)
- Lists of immovable heritage sites in East Flanders
- Lists of immovable heritage sites in Flemish Brabant
- Lists of immovable heritage sites in West Flanders

== Brussels ==
The Brussels-Capital Region has their own protection agency called Monuments & Sites (in French: Monuments et sites de l'Administration de l'Aménagement du Territoire et du Logement Ministère de la Région de Bruxelles-Capitale, and in Dutch: Monumenten en Landschappen van het Bestuur Ruimtelijke Ordening en Huisvesting van het Ministerie Brussels Hoofdstedelijk Gewest). They publish the inventory of protected heritage sites and coordinate the European Heritage Days as well as the marking of local heritage sites with their own logo. See the List of protected heritage sites in the Brussels-Capital Region for the protected objects.

== See also ==
- Beschermd erfgoed
- Culture of Belgium
