= René de Clercq =

Flemish writer

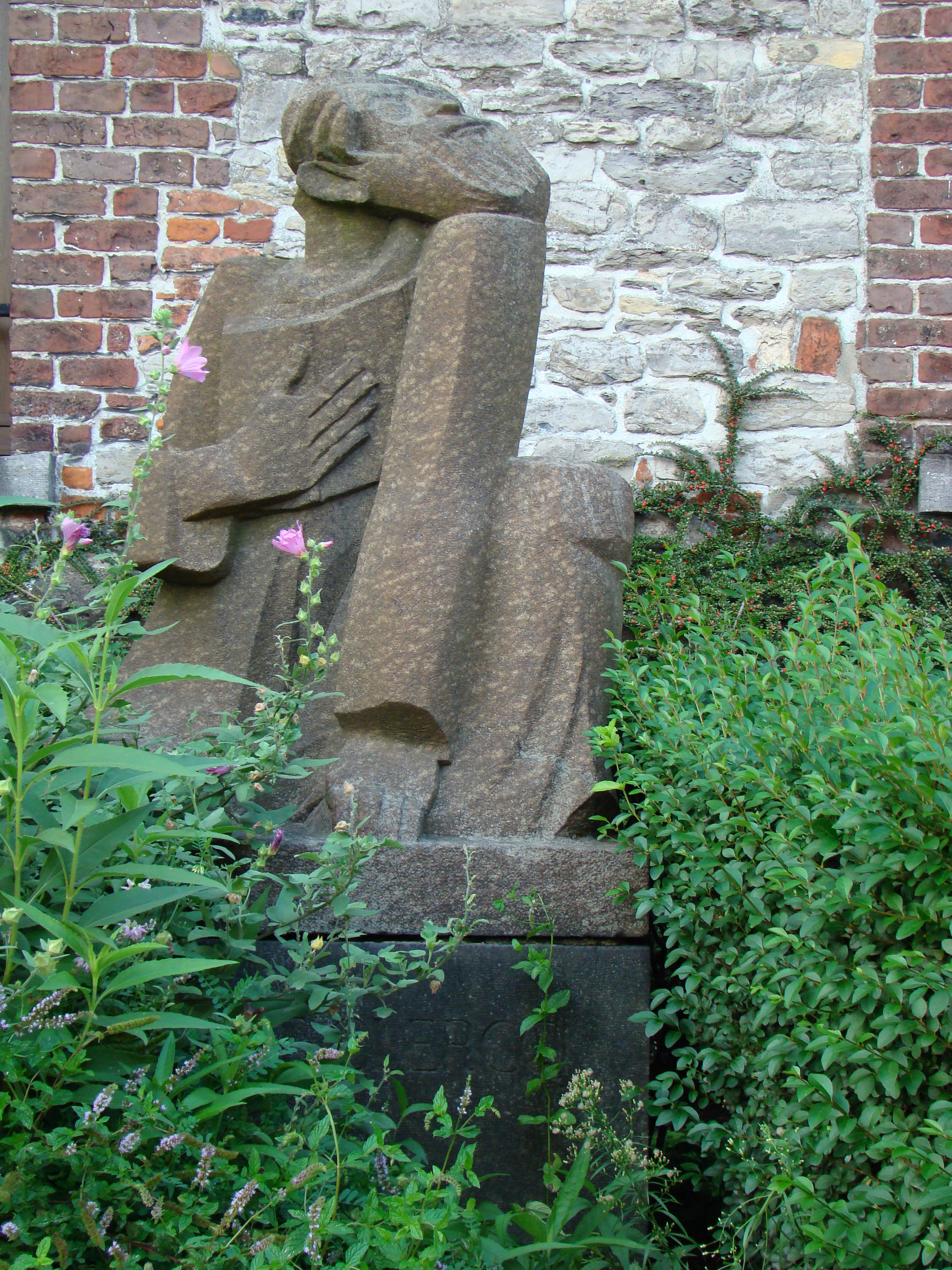
Monument to De Clercq in Deerlijk, West Flanders.

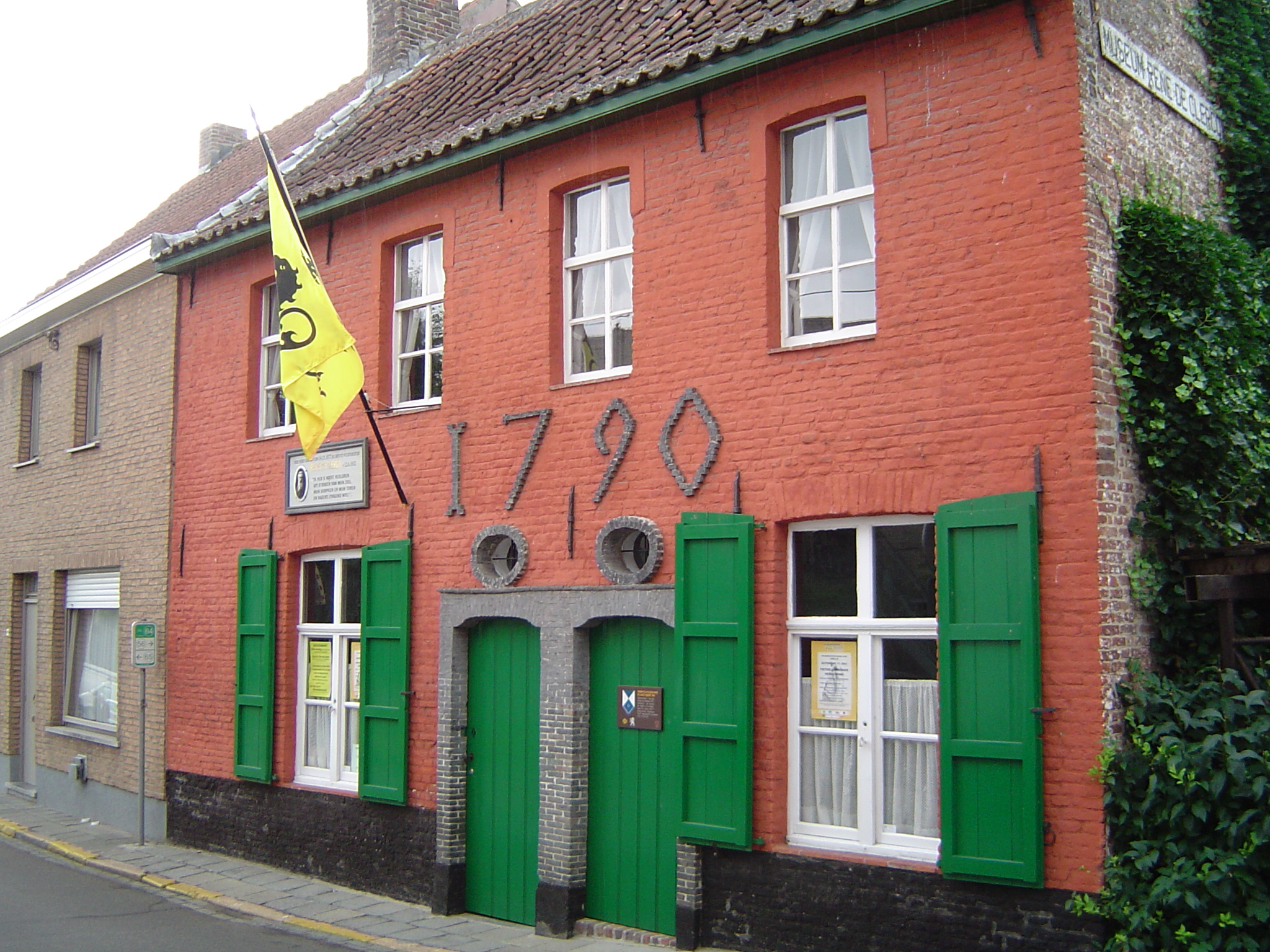
Museum

René De Clercq (né Desiderius Declercq; 14 November 1877 – 12 June 1932) was a Flemish-Dutch political activist, writer, poet, and composer.

== Biography ==
He was the son of a flax dealer and rope-maker who also ran a local inn. After studying at the Ghent University he became a contributor and editor for the magazine Van Nu en Straks. During World War I he fled to the Netherlands. There he taught at the Belgian school in Amsterdam, while editing and contributing (mostly poetry) to the expat magazine "De Vlaamsche Stem" (The Flemish Voice), which (with German funding) slowly became an organ for Flemish activism. After the magazine was discontinued in 1916, he wrote a now famous poem directed at the Belgian government in exile in Le Havre, "Aan die van Havere" (To the Havrians). In 1917 he wrote the song "Daar is maar één Vlaanderen" (There is only one Flanders) that became the national anthem of the Flemish separatists. On December 22, 1917, the Raad van Vlaanderen declared its independence from Belgium.

De Clercq became curator of the museum dedicated to the art of the controversial 19th century Belgian romantic painter Antoine Wiertz in Brussels. He made a cultural journey through Germany that was well received. After the war he fled again to the Netherlands, where he received by letter the news of the death sentence pronounced upon him by the Belgian government in 1920. In the same year he travelled around the Netherlands with a small band performing his songs. Only after amnesty in 1929 did he return to Flanders for a short visit.

Fifty years after he death he was reburied in Deerlijk, Belgium. His place of birth there is now a museum. His book of songs and poetry De Noodhoorn, published in 1916, is listed in the Canon of Dutch Literature.
