= Van Nu en Straks =

Belgian, Dutch-language literary magazine

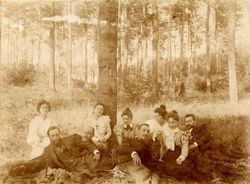
Van Nu en Straks participants (1897) l.t.r.: Gaby Brouhon, Jacques Mesnil, Alfred Hegenscheidt, Louise Hegenscheidt, Margot Brouhon, August Vermeylen, Lili Koetlitz, Clara Koetlitz and Emmanuel De Bom.

Van Nu en Straks (Dutch pronunciation: [vɑˈny ɛn ˈstrɑks]; Of Now and Later or Today and Tomorrow) was a Flemish literary and cultural magazine that was founded in 1893 by August Vermeylen. With a cover designed by Henry van de Velde, this magazine served as a vehicle for a Flemish literary revival and was associated with a heterogeneous group of writers and artists. They were devoted to art for art's sake, without holding dogmatic views on aesthetics or adherence to schools of art. The magazine was published in two series: from 1893–94 and from 1896–1901. It was succeeded in 1903 by the illustrated magazine Vlaanderen, which was co-founded by Herman Teirlinck.

== See also ==
- Cyriel Buysse
