= Declaration of Sainte-Adresse =

1916 World War I diplomatic announcement

The Declaration of Sainte-Adresse was a diplomatic announcement made on 14 February 1916 by the principal Allied powers of the First World War (Britain, France and Russia). It was also supported by Italy and Japan. The declaration stated that the powers would refuse to sign any peace treaty ending the war that left Belgium, a neutral power at the war's start, without "political and economic independence". It was extended in April 1916 to also cover the Belgian Congo.

== Background ==
Belgium in 1916; the red portion was occupied by German forces, only the western-most white section remained in Belgian hands

The majority of Belgium had been occupied by the Germans in the early stages of the First World War. A government-in-exile had been established at Sainte-Adresse in France. A minister in the cabinet, Paul Hymans, worried that his nation would not be allowed to participate in any peace treaty negotiations following the end of the war. He worried that, in the absence of a Belgian representative to argue against it, the great powers would permit Germany to retain some Belgian territory. This was despite Britain, one of the principal Allied countries, entering the war to defend Belgium's neutrality (as established by the 1839 Treaty of London). British prime minister H. H. Asquith had committed to the restoration of Belgian territory as a principal war aim in a London Guildhall speech of 9 December 1914. A further assurance was made by British foreign minister Edward Grey in August 1915 that Britain would insist upon restoration of full Belgian independence in any peace negotiation.

Following the Italian entry into the war in May 1915, with territorial expansion promised by the Allies in the Treaty of London, Belgium considered renouncing her neutrality to secure similar rewards. However this was considered unacceptable by the Belgian government and the Allies. On 20 December the Belgian cabinet directed the foreign minister, Baron Napoléon-Eugène Beyens, to seek a commitment from the Allies to a Belgian seat at any peace conference and to continue to safeguard her neutrality. Beyens visited Paris to meet with the French government but before he could visit London the British set in motion their own plans. The British had been spurred on by the Belgian concerns over the peace conference and were also keen to counter defeatism in occupied Belgium and to reinvigorate support for the war in Belgian king Albert I. Britain also thought a conciliatory gesture was advisable following their opposition to the American supply of food to occupied Belgium, arguing that it assisted Germany.

== Declaration ==
The British proposed a formal declaration by the major Allied powers and this was agreed to by the French government. Beyens' ministry then drafted the declaration. The declaration states that the major Allied powers (Britain, France and Russia) would not sign a peace deal that failed to ensure Belgium's "political and economic independence" and provide her with financial reimbursement for damage suffered in the war. The parties also pledged to support the "commercial and financial rehabilitation" of the country and to ensure Belgium was represented at any peace conference. Russia was initially reluctant to make the declaration in case Serbia made a similar request but was persuaded that Belgium was a special case. At French insistence Britain deleted a clause in the draft referring to Belgium's "just aims" for the war. No mention was made of any territorial expansion of Belgium after the war and the British foreign secretary, Arthur Balfour, was clear that his government opposed this when questioned in July 1916. In exchange for the declaration Belgium reiterated its commitment to the Allies not to conclude a separate peace with any of the Central Powers.

The declaration was made in the names of and presence of the ambassadors of France, Britain and Russia to Belgium at the ministry of foreign affairs in Sainte-Adresse on 14 February 1916. The declaration was read by the Russian ambassador Prince Koudacheff. Beyens spoke afterwards to express his thanks to the Allies.

The Italian and Japanese governments issued statements shortly afterwards, noting that the declaration was made with their consent. On 29 April 1916 the declaration was extended to the Belgian Congo, at Albert I's insistence and in response to an American proposal that the colony be sold to Germany with the proceeds being used as reparations for Belgium. The Congo statement was treated as an appendix to the Declaration.

=== Text of the declaration ===
The Allied powers and guarantors declare that, when the time comes, the Belgian Government shall be invited to participate in the negotiations of peace and that they will not terminate hostilities until Belgium shall be reestablished in her political and economic independence, and liberally indemnified for the losses which she has sustained. They will extend their aid to Belgium in order to insure her commercial and financial restoration.

— Declaration of Sainte-Adresse, 14 February 1916

== Later events ==
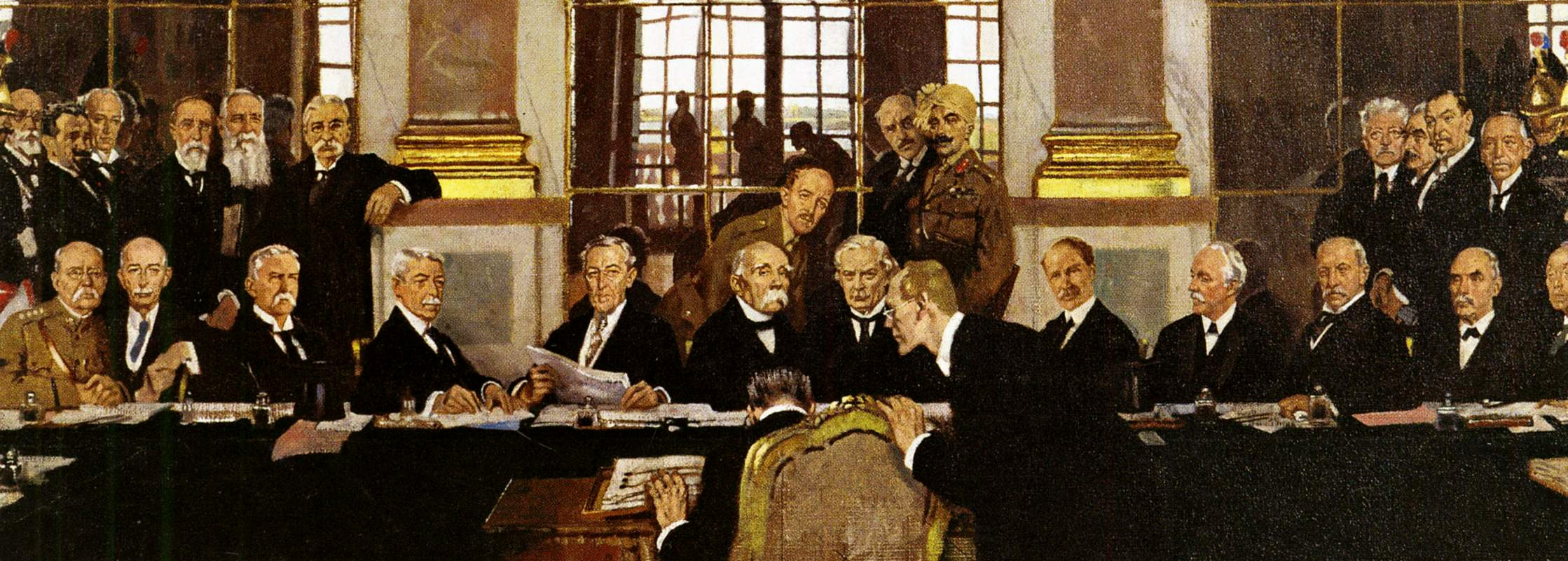
Hymans is shown here third from right on the back row during the signing of the Treaty of Versailles

Peace negotiations between the Allies and the Central Powers began in 1919 at the Paris Peace Conference following the Armistice of 11 November 1918. The Allies divided their delegations into those "powers of general interest" (the UK, France, US, Italy and Japan) and the remainder, "of limited interest", including Belgium. The minor nations were effectively excluded from participating in the major decisions. In the Treaty of Versailles Belgium was allocated a small portion of former German territory (including Malmedy and Eupen) and received a League of Nations mandate over the former German East African territory of Ruanda-Urundi but found its demands for the annexation of Luxembourg and part of the Netherlands unfulfilled. Hymans was appointed the first president of the League of Nations.

Germany was required to pay 132 billion gold marks in reparations to the Allies, with Belgium receiving priority on the first two billion marks in cash. Because of the priority arrangement and difficulties that post-war Germany had in meeting its obligations, the other Allies did not receive any cash payments before the failure to meet payments led to a Franco-Belgian occupation of the Ruhr in 1923, after British proposals to reform the system (including removal of the Belgian priority) failed. Germany paid just over 20 billion marks before reparation repayments ceased after the failed Lausanne Conference of 1932.

In the run up to the German invasion of May 1940 Belgian king Leopold III discussed a possible renewal of the declaration with Britain, but the government of Neville Chamberlain did not progress the matter. The declaration of 1916 formed the basis for Belgium's war aims in the Second World War.
