= Paul Hymans =

Belgian politician (1865–1941)

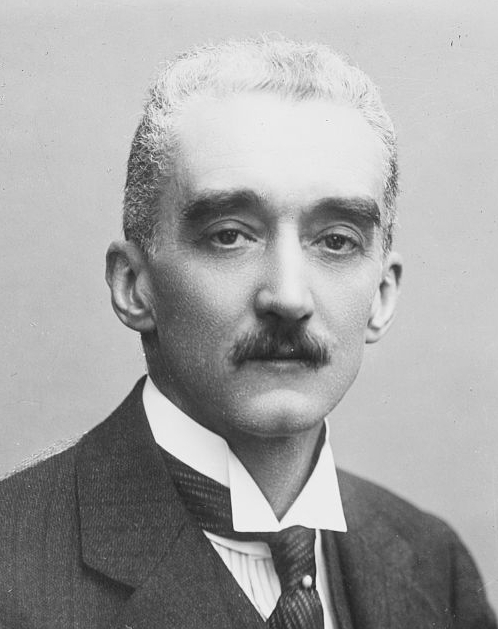
- Born: Paul Louis Adrien Henri Hymans; 23 March 1865; Ixelles/Elsene, Belgium
- Died: 8 March 1941 (aged 75); Nice, France
- Occupation: politician

Paul Louis Adrien Henri Hymans (23 March 1865 – 8 March 1941), was a Belgian politician associated with the Liberal Party. He was the second president of the League of Nations and served again as its president in 1932–1933.

== Life ==
Hymans was the son of the Belgian writer and historian Louis Hymans, himself the son of a Jewish doctor originally from Dordrecht, and Louise de l'Escaille, a Christian Protestant Belgian Walloon. His mother came from an old aristocratic Belgian Walloon family. He became a lawyer and professor at the Universite Libre de Bruxelles. As a politician, he became Belgian Minister for Foreign Affairs, holding this post from 1918 to 1920 (and again from 1927 to 1935), was Minister of Justice from 1926 to 1927 and member of the Council of Ministers from 1935 to 1936. In 1919, together with Charles de Broqueville and Emile Vandervelde he introduced universal suffrage for all men (one man, one vote) and compulsory education.

As foreign minister during the Great War, Hymans was successful in securing promises from the Allies that amounted to co-belligerency. Britain, France and Russia pledged in the Declaration of Sainte-Adresse in February 1916 that Belgium would be included in the peace negotiations, its independence would be restored and it would receive monetary compensation from Germany for the damage. When the war began, Hymans also received major promises of relief support from the United States that were approved by President Woodrow Wilson. Relief was directed primarily by the American Herbert Hoover and involved several agencies: the Commission for Relief in Belgium, American Relief Administration, and Comité National de Secours et d'Alimentation. At the Paris Peace Conference in 1919, Belgium officially ended its longtime neutral status and became the first in line to receive reparations payments from Germany. However, Belgium received only a bit of German territory and was rejected in its demands for all of Luxembourg and part of the Netherlands. However, it was given colonial mandates over the German colonies of Rwanda and Burundi. Hymans was the leading spokesman for the small countries at Paris and became the president of the first assembly of the new League of Nations. He helped to form the customs union of Belgium and Luxembourg (Belgium-Luxembourg Economic Union) in 1921 and played a leading part in negotiating the Dawes Plan in 1924. In 1928, he signed the Kellogg-Briand Pact for Belgium.

A Protestant and a freemason, he was a member of the lodge Les Amis Philanthropes of the Grand Orient of Belgium in Brussels. He is interred in the Ixelles Cemetery in Brussels.

== Bibliography ==
- Paul Hymans, Pages liberales (E: Liberal Notes), 1936

== Notes ==
Preceded by Léon Bourgeois	President of the League of Nations; 1920–1921	Succeeded by Herman Adriaan van Karnebeek
