= August Vermeylen =

Belgian writer and literary critic (1872–1945)

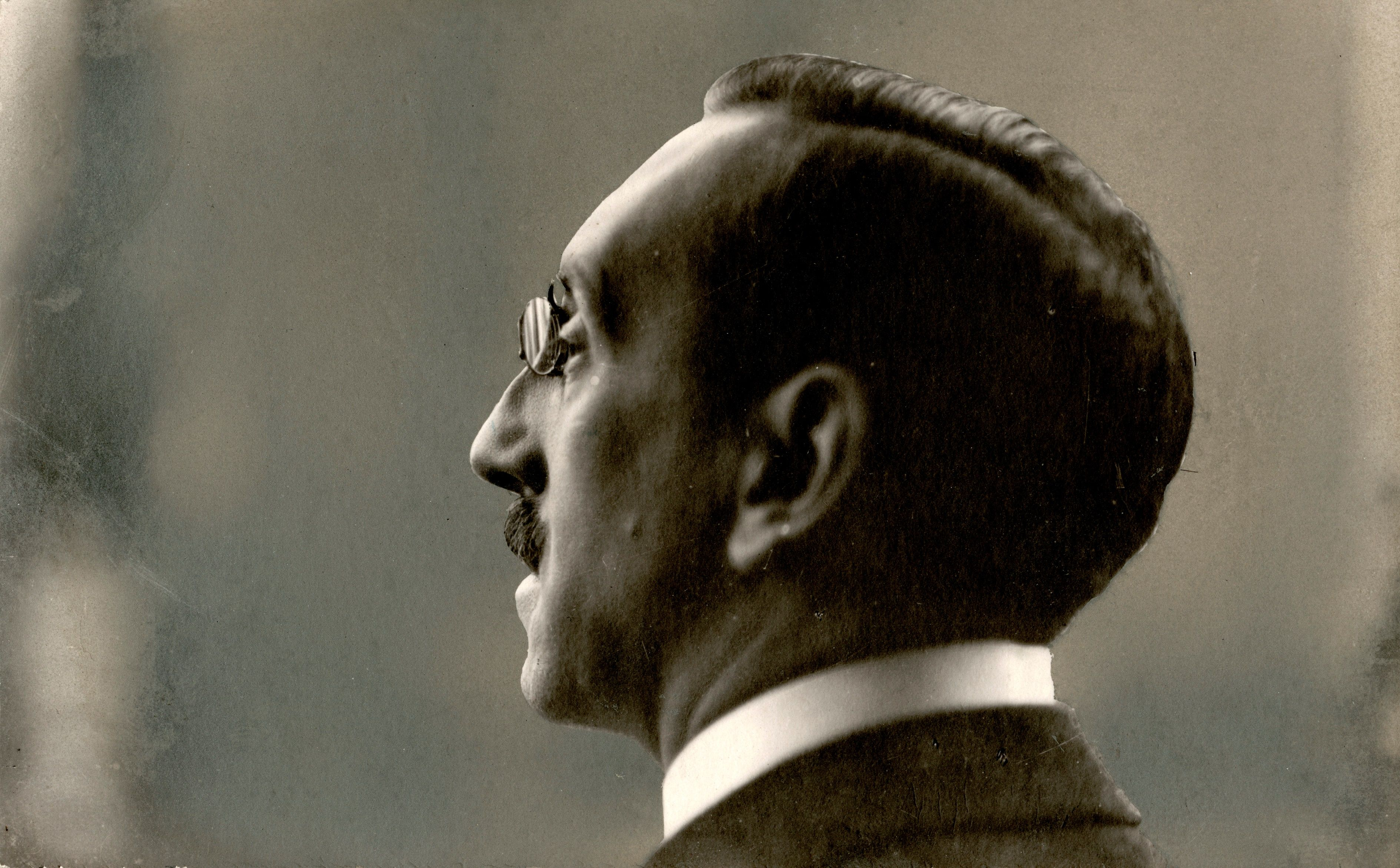
August Vermeylen

August Vermeylen (12 May 1872, in Brussels – 10 January 1945, in Uccle) was a Belgian writer and literature critic. In 1893 he founded the literary journal Van Nu en Straks (Of Today and Tomorrow). He studied history at the Free University of Brussels (ULB), and became a professor of literature and of art history at the ULB (1901–1923). In addition to many works of literary and art criticism, he wrote poetry and in 1906 a novel, De wandelende Jood (English: The Wandering Jew). A cultural organization, the Vermeylenfonds, was named after him.

Politically, Vermeylen supported both the unitarian Belgian state (to the point of condemning the Flemish Pro-German activists during World War I) and an equal status for the Dutch language in that state. From 1921 to his death he was a senator for the Belgian Labour Party. In 1930, he became the first rector of the newly Dutchified Flemish Universiteit Gent (English: Ghent University). In 1938, he became vice-president of the Senate. In 1940, he was removed from all his official functions by the German occupation force.

August Vermeylen was the father of the Belgian socialist politician, Piet Vermeylen.

== Bibliography ==
- Het twaalfjarig bestand (thesis, 1894)
- Eene jeugd (essay, 1896)
- Leven en werken van Jonker Jan van der Noot (thesis, 1899)
- Vlaamsche en Europeesche beweging (essay, 1900)
- Verzamelde opstellen, eerste bundel (1904, published again in 1922)
- Verzamelde opstellen, tweede bundel (1905, published again in 1924)
- Kritiek der Vlaamsche Beweging (essay, 1906)
- Les lettres néerlandaises en Belgique depuis 1830 (1906)
- De wandelende Jood (roman, 1906)
- Quelques aspects de la question des langues en Belgique (1918)
- La flamandisation de l'université de Gand / De vervlaamsching der Gentsche Hoogeschool (1920)
- Geschiedenis der Europeesche plastiek en schilderkunst in Middeleeuwen en Nieuweren Tijd (studie, 3 delen, 1921–1922–1925)
- Van Gezelle tot Timmermans (1923)
- Impressions de Russie (1932)
- Hieronymus Bosch (1939)
- Beschouwingen. Een nieuwe reeks verzamelde opstellen (1942)
- Twee vrienden (autobiography, 1943)
- De Taak (1946)
- Van de catacomben tot Greco (1946)
- Verzameld werk (6 parts, 1951–1955)

== Sources ==
- August Vermeylen (Univ. of Brussels)
- History of the Vermeylenfonds
