= Beyens =

Beyens is a surname. Notable people with the surname include:

- Beyens de Grambais, Dutch-Belgian nobility
- Beyens (Belgian family), Belgian nobility
- Beyens (Spanish family), Spanish merchant family in Cadiz
- Kristof Beyens (born 1983), Belgian sprinter

== See also ==
- Boyens
