= Boyen =

Boyen may refer to:

- Govert Boyen (born 1977), Belgian football goalkeeper
- Guillaume Boyen (Willem Boy, 1520-1592), Flemish painter, sculptor, and architect
- Hermann von Boyen (1771-1848), Prussian army officer
- Boyen Fortress, a former Prussian fortress located in the western part of Giżycko, in Warmian-Masurian Voivodeship, northeastern Poland

== See also ==
- Boyens, a surname
- Yorck Boyen Insterburg, a former German association football club
