= List of ambassadors of Belgium to the Holy See =

The following is the list of Belgian Ambassadors to the Holy See, past and present. A Belgian Ambassador serves as that country's official representative to the Holy See since formal diplomatic relations began in 1832. Between 1880 and 1885, there were no diplomatic relations between Belgium and the Holy See.

== List of ambassadors ==
- 1832 – 1835 : Charles Vilain XIIII
- 1836 – 1838 : Prosper Edouard Noyer
- 1837 : Charles Vilain XIIII
- 1838 – 1844 : Émile d'Oultremont de Wégimont
- 1844 – 1846 : Charles van den Steen de Jehay
- 1846 – 1847 : Joseph de Riquet de Caraman
- 1848 – 1849 : Eugène de Ligne
- 1849 – 1850 : Emile de Meester de Ravestein
- 1850 – 1850 : Henri de Brouckère
- 1850 – 1859 : Emile de Meester de Ravestein
- 1959 – 1867 : Henri Carolus
- 1875 – 1880 : Auguste d'Anethan
- 1885 – 1888 : Charles de Pitteurs-Hiegaerts
- 1889 – 1894 : Edouard Whettnall
- 1894 – 1896 : Théodore de Bounder de Melsbroeck
- 1896 - 1915 : Baron d'Erp
- 1915 - 1918 : Jules Van den Heuvel
- 1919 - 1921 : Count Léo d'Ursel
- 1921 - 1924 : Baron Eugène Beyens
- 1924 - 1926 : Stéphane Ruzette (Envoy)
- 1926 - 1935 : Maximilien van Ypersele de Strihou
- 1935 - 1937 : Baron Roger de Borchgrave
- 1938 - 1939 : Bernard de l’Escaille
- 1939 - 1945 : Adrien Nieuwenhuys
- 1946 - 1948 : Prince Reginald de Cröy
- 1948 - 1953 : Baron Alexandre Paternotte de La Vaillée
- 1953 - 1957 : Viscount Joseph Berryer
- 1957 - 1968 : Baron Prosper Poswick
- 1968 - 1972 : Albert Hupperts
- 1972 - 1976 : Prince Werner de Merode
- 1976 - 1977 : Willy Verriest
- 1977 - 1980 : Felix Standaert
- 1980 - 1984 : Baron Eugène Rittweger de Moor
- 1984 - 1988 : Baron Alexandre Paternotte de La Vaillée
- 1988 - 1991 : Ferdinand De Wilde
- 1991 - 1994 : Baron Henri Beyens
- 1994 - 1998 : Juan Cassiers
- 1998 - 2002 : Thierry Muûls
- 2002 - 2006 : Benoît Cardon de Lichtbuer
- 2006 - 2010 : Frank E. de Coninck
- 2010 - 2014 : Charles Ghislain
- 2014 - 2016 : Bruno Nève de Mévergnies
- 2016 - 2020 : Count Jean Cornet d'Elzius
- 2020 - present : Patrick Renault

== See also ==
- Diplomatic missions of Belgium
- Foreign relations of Belgium

== Sources ==
- Ambassadors to the Holy See
- l’Ambassade de Belgique près le Saint-Siège à Rome (French)
- Le Saint-Siège et le Vatican (French)
