= List of protected heritage sites in Bernissart =

This table shows an overview of the protected heritage sites in the Walloon town Bernissart. This list is part of Belgium's national heritage.

Object	Year/architect	Town/section	Address	Coordinates	Number^{?}	Image
Swamp Area of Harchies: the ponds of "Rivage" ^{(nl)} ^{(fr)}		Bernissart		50.471469°N 3.686078°E	51009-CLT-0001-01 Info	Moerasgebied van Harchies: de vijvers van "Rivage"
Church of Tous les Saints and old cemetery ^{(nl)} ^{(fr)}		Bernissart		50.501063°N 3.662157°E	51009-CLT-0002-01 Info	
Church of Sainte Vierge ^{(nl)} ^{(fr)}		Bernissart		50.461155°N 3.712051°E	51009-CLT-0003-01 Info	
Old town hall: walls and roofs ^{(nl)} ^{(fr)}		Bernissart		50.500985°N 3.660689°E	51009-CLT-0005-01 Info	
Presbytery: facade and roof ^{(nl)} ^{(fr)}		Bernissart	rue de l'église, n°28	50.500574°N 3.662230°E	51009-CLT-0006-01 Info	
Site of Préau ^{(nl)} ^{(fr)}		Bernissart		50.474260°N 3.666766°E	51009-CLT-0007-01 Info	
Lime kilns and this ensemble with the environment ^{(nl)} ^{(fr)}		Bernissart	route Nationale bij ongeveer n°505	50.503721°N 3.644913°E	51009-CLT-0008-01 Info	
Weir of Debihan Heine ^{(nl)} ^{(fr)}		Bernissart		50.444997°N 3.750772°E	51009-CLT-0010-01 Info	Sluis van Débihan van Heine

== See also ==
- List of protected heritage sites in Hainaut (province)
- Bernissart
