= Beyens (Belgian family) =

Beyens is a Belgian family of lawyers and diplomats, originating from Nazareth near Deinze and admitted into the Belgian nobility in 1851.

== The Beyens family in Nazareth ==
The name Beyens is frequently found in Nazareth, in Deinze and more generally in the Ghent area. In the early seventeenth century people named Beyens belonged to the notable personalities of the area. Livinus Beyens was mayor of Nazareth in 1625.

In the first quarter of the 18th century, Franciscus Beyens, born in Nazareth on 7 August 1691, married Josine (Judoca) Van Acker. Franciscus was the son of Paulus Beyens, born in Nazareth 29 October 1659, and of Joanna Vermeersch and the grandson of Laurentius Beyens, born in Nazareth on 28 March 1630 and Petronella Wouters. The couple Beyens-Van Acker went on living in Wontergem near Deinze and had five children:

- Petrus Beyens (born 21 January 1721)
- Jean-François Beyens (born 18 January 1723)
- Joseph Beyens (born 5 January 1725)
- Jacobus Beyens (born 15 February 1727)
- Petrus-Franciscus Beyens (born 16 February 1731)

There is uncertainty about the profession of Beyens-Van Acker, but most probably he was a (gentleman?)-farmer on the farm named Ter Linden.

== Pierre François Beyens and sons ==
Pierre-François Beyens (Wontergem, 16 February 1731 – Deinze 24 August 1794), nicknamed 'The Rich Man', was married with Marie-Jeanne Camberlyn (1724–1801). She was a daughter of Egide Camberlyn, holder of the seigniory of Amougies and of Marie-Jeanne Amelot, and a sister of Egide Guillaume Camberlyn who was town clark in Ghent.

Beyens took up the profession of notary in Deinze (1751–1794). He became alderman of Deinze (1777–1784) and mayor (1788–1792).

The couple had five girls and five boys:

- Marie-Thérèse (1754–1782)
- Carola (1756, died young)
- Jan-Baptist-Hubert (1757 – before 1766)
- Constant (1758–1808)
- Albert (1760–1827)
- Isabelle (1760 – before 1767)
- Eugène-Frans (1762–1793)
- Rosalie (1764– c. 1796)
- Jean-Baptiste-Justin (1766–1829)
- Isabelle (1767 – c. 1803)

The four sons who reached adult life studied at the University of Louvain. They were inscribed as follows: 1) Constantin 14 January 1778,- 2) Albert 23 January 1781 – 3) Eugène 7 January 1783 – 4) Jean-Baptiste 12 January 1786.

=== Constantin Beyens ===
Constantin Beyens (Deinze, 15 September 1758 – Ghent, 12 December 1808) was the fourth child of the couple Beyens-Camberlyn and the eldest to reach adult life. After his law studies in Louvain, he joined the notaryoffice of his father. In 1790 he became an active Patriot and participated in the fights against the Austrian troops.

In 1791 he became known as a rich and popular lawyer and notary, ready to adopt the revolutionary ideas. After the first French invasion he became, on 11 December 1792, a member of the city council of Deinze. After the second and more durable invasion of June 1794 he became secretary of the district authority, also remaining a notary. From 1797 on he was again member of the city council of Deinze.

In April 1800 he was appointed 'sous-préfet' in Oudenaarde. In 1803 he became, along with two of his brothers, a member of the lodge Les Amis Philantropes in Brussels. His reputation was perhaps not untainted. A confidential report for Napoleon mentioned him as 'the only sous-préfet unfavourably reported'. He died in Gent at the house of his brother Albert, as a result, so it was reported, of a blood vomit.

=== Albert Guillaume Marie Beyens ===
Albert Guillaume Marie Beyens (Deinze, 8 November 1760 – Brussels, 7 November 1827), who had a twin sister, Isabelle Beyens (who died before 1767), was the second living son of Pierre-François Beyens . For his studies at the University of Louvain at the college called The Falcon, he was by mistake registered as coming from Courtrai. After obtaining his degree in law, he in 1787 became a lawyer in Ghent. He modestly took part in the political life of the town and in 1792 he was appointed as an alderman. He wrote three juridic treaties, preserved in handwriting:

- Commentaire sur la Coutume d'Alost
- Notulen op de Costuymen van Gent
- Reflexiones ad Consuetudines Gandavenses.

Remaining a lawyer during the following years, he was 39 when in 1800 he married the young Suzanne Mouriau (1778–1814). The same year he was appointed president of the court in Ghent (1800–1810). He was very favourably evaluated in official reports. Prefect Faipoult wrote: Learned, intelligent, knowledgeable of the Flemish jurisprudence and the commissioner of the government wrote: there is no judge capable of replacing him.

In 1803 he became a member of the lodge 'Les Amis Philantropes' in Brussels. In 1808he was made a lecturer at the newly founded 'Ecole spéciale de droit'.

He possessed an extensive library, of which the librarian De Goesin published an inventory in five volumes. The attorney-general Frans Jozef Beyts wrote about him (and this at a time when Beyens had fallen in disfavour: I attended some of his sessions at the tribunal. Nothing surpassed his skill, his easy way of solving problems, his accurate views. His honesty is recognized, he identifies himself with the Codes of justice procedure, he studies them and applicates them with passion, from morning till night, he is a man of extraordinary talents.

1809 became for him a dramatic year. In order to finance his purchases of nationalized property he had signed bills of exchange in favour of the banker Josse Bernard Goethals. When the banker was declared bankrupt, Beyens was dragged along. Not only did his creditors claim their due, but Goethals had also made forged bills with the signature of Beyens. Although he was a magistrate and not a merchant, He was also declared bankrupt. His enemies published pamphlets accusing him of all sorts of misconduct. His situation became untenable and he had to resign. He was however helped by the government and given a post as lecturer at the Law School in Amsterdam. There he found time to write two juridic treaties (also remained unpublished):

- Projet d'une loi relative à la procédure civile (1811)
- Projet de code pour le royaume de Hollande (1812)

In 1817, having lost in Amsterdam his wife and one of his two daughters, he came back to the Southern Netherlands. He established himself as a lawyer in Brussels and soon acquired a favorable reputation, especially where actions against the king and the government were involved.

=== Eugène-Frans Beyens ===
Eugène-Frans Beyens (Deinze 25 May 1762 – Ghent 10 October 1793) acquired the degree of doctor in theology at Louvain and on 8 September 1787 he was ordained as a priest. He died in his early thirties.

=== Jean-Baptiste Justin Beyens ===
Jean-Baptiste Justin Beyens (Deinze, 5 June 1766 – Brussels, 1 November 1829) was the ninth child of the couple Beyens-Camberlyn. He studied in Louvain with excellent results. In 1791 he became a lawyer in Ghent. When the French conquered Flanders, he began travelling to Amsterdam and Hamburg. Upon his return, he was appointed as public prosecutor in Ghent and was also made a member of the city council. In 1798, following the hardening of the Directoire, he was dismissed.

In 1797 he was also made a lecturer at the Ecole centrale of the Scheldt department. But the dictatorial hardliner and commissioner Grégoire Du Bosch called him an enemy of the people and dismissed him. But in July 1799 the tide turned and Du Bosch was permanently banned from the political life in Ghent. Beyens had won, but he didn't enjoy it for long, because he moved to Brussels, where he became a lawyer and advocate. As his two brothers he became a member of the lodge 'Les Amis Philanthropes' and contrary to them he remained an active member during many years. In 1814 he married with Isabelle Fonteyne (1792-).

As a lawyer, often in association with his brother, he defended citizens defying the authorities. A few of his notable cases were:

- on behalve of the administrators of the Alms houses in Ghent against count Vilain XIIII for amounts still due by his father Philippe Vilain XIIII.
- Thérèse Dons de Lovendeghem against her father Louis-Ferdinand Dons de Lovendeghem
- the reverend Leon de Foere, publisher of 'Le Spectateur Belge'
- Charles Van der Straeten, author of 'De l'état actuel du Royaume des Pays-Bas et des moyens de l'améliorer' (1819)
- the reverend vicars Ambrosius Goethals and Frans Martens, jailed for four years.

Jean-Baptiste Beyens died a few months before the Belgian revolution began. He was later seen as one of the forerunners and in the Biographie Nationale he and his brother are described as, with their energy and talents having prepared the Belgian revolution of 1830.

His daughter Hortense married the well known Dutch general Hubert Joseph Jean Lambert de Stuers. His son Eugène chose entirely for the new Belgian kingdom.

== Eugène Beyens ==
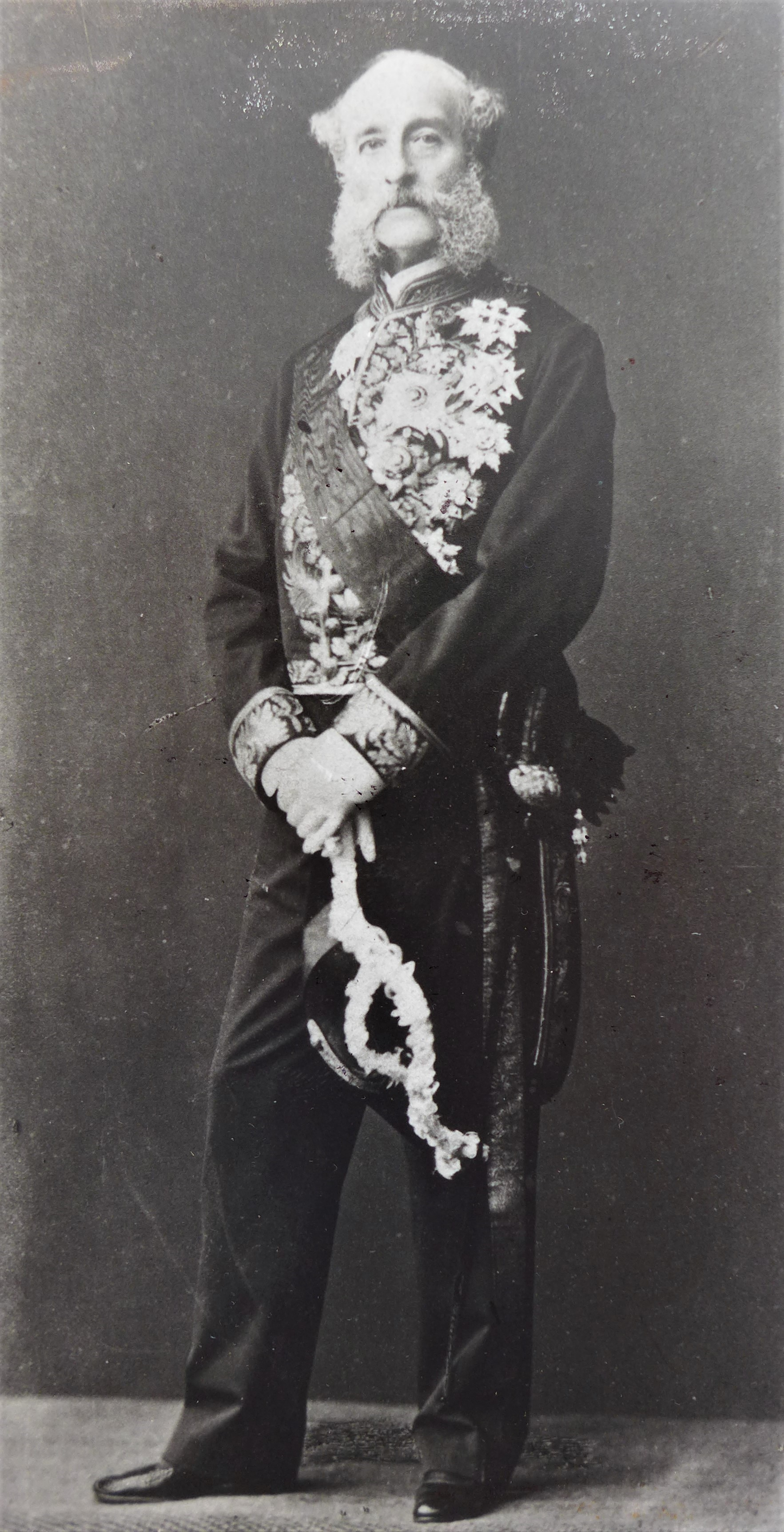
Baron Eugène Beyens (1816–1894), Belgian ambassador in Paris

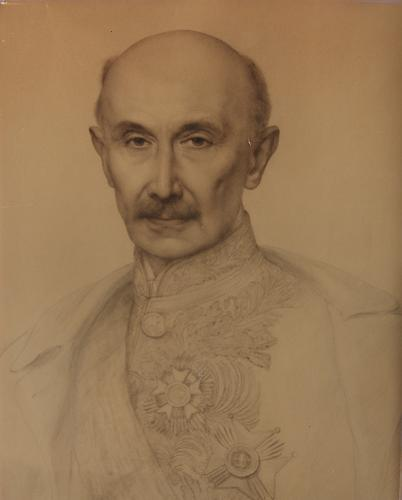
Baron Napoleon-Eugène Beyens (1855–1934) Minister of State, Minister of Foreign Affairs

Eugène Beyens (Brussels, 12 November 1816 – Presle, 17 July 1894) was a Belgian diplomat. He married in Madrid on 29 June 1851 with Maria de las Mercedes Alcala Galiano y Valencia (Madrid 1828 – Paris 1917), daughter of the count of Casa Valencia.

He was one of the first diplomats of the kingdom of Belgium. After peace was made with the Netherlands, he became a diplomat in The Hague and in Madrid. In 1850 he was at the Belgian legacy in Coburg and in 1853 he was appointed at the embassy in Paris. He was appointed as ambassador in 1864 and remained in Paris until his dead. His wife was a friend of the empress Eugénie, wife of the emperor Napoleon III.

On 26 November 1850, while he was secretary at the embassy in Coburg, duke Ernst II of Saksen-Coburg and Gotha bestowed upon him a title of baron ('Freiherr'), hereditary for all his descendants. This bestowal had no legal ground in Belgium. On 15 July 1851 status and title were however confirmed within the Belgian nobility.

== Napoléon-Eugène Beyens ==
Napoleon-Eugène Beyens (Paris, 24 March 1855 – Brussels, 3 January 1934), son of ambassador Eugène Beyens, married with Marguerite Oppenheim (1871–1949), daughter of a banker in Frankfurt.

After having worked with his father from 1877 on, he was sent to Madrid for a year, then became a secretary of king Leopold II, rejoined his father in Paris and became 'chargé d'affaires' during his illness. He was then posted in Teheran (1894) and Bucharest (1896–1906). In 1910 he became chief of staff for king Albert I, with the title of 'Ministre de la Maison du Roi'. In 1912 he was posted as ambassador in Berlin, and in 1914 had to take receipt of the declaration of war by the Germans.

In 1915 he was made a minister of state, and from 1915 until 1917 he was minister of foreign affairs in the government in exile presided by Charles de Broqueville.

In 1920 Beyens and two other diplomats were appointed by the League of Nations as arbiters for the dispute between Sweden and Finland over the Ålande Islands. From 1921 to 1925 he was Belgian ambassador at the Vatican. As a historian he published:

- Le second Empire. Ed. Desclée, De Brouwer, 1924
- Deux années à Berlin, 1931
- Quatre ans à Rome, 1934.

He also published a book of memoirs:

- Germany before the War (1916)

His historic work got him elected as a member of the Académie royale de Belgique.

== Antoine Beyens ==
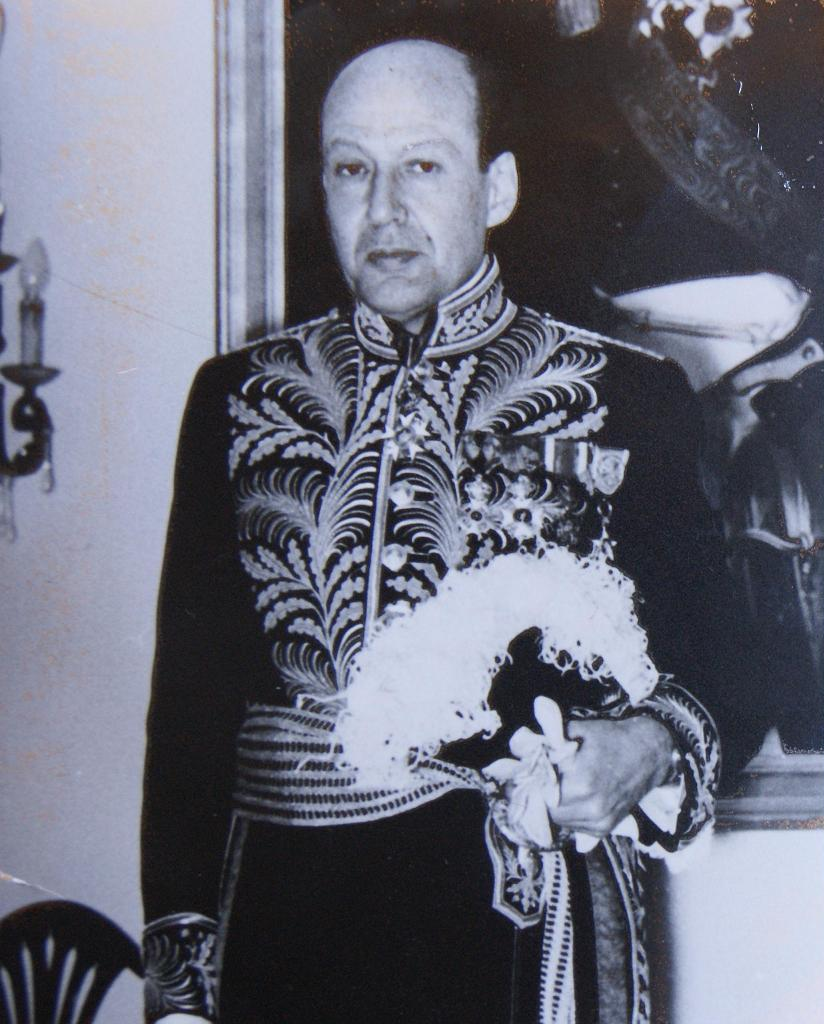
Baron Antoine Beyens (1906–1995), Belgian ambassador

Antoine Nicolas Beyens (Paris, 6 October 1906 – Brussels, 15 December 1995) was the son of Napoleon-Eugène Beyens. He married with Simonne Goüin (Paris 17 February 1911 – Ixelles 15 December 1991), from a wealthy French banking and industrial family, and they had three sons.

He entered the diplomatic services in 1932 and worked at the embassies in Washington, Mexico and London. During the war he served the Belgian government in exile. After the war he was chargé d'affaires in Madrid and negotiated – in vain – with the government of general Francisco Franco regarding the extradition of Léon Degrelle. In 1951 he was appointed consul-general in Rabat. He finished his career as ambassador in Lisbon (1958–1962) and Madrid (1963–1967). From 1967 until 1971 he was working at the Ministry of Foreign Affairs in Brussels.

His sons were:

- Christian Beyens (1938–1986) x Beatrice Elleboudt (°1939)
- François Beyens (°1941), physician, secretary-general of the 'International Council of Medical Acupuncture and Related Techniques (ICMART)'
- Ghislain Beyens (Woking 1953 – Alicante 2001)

== Henri Beyens ==
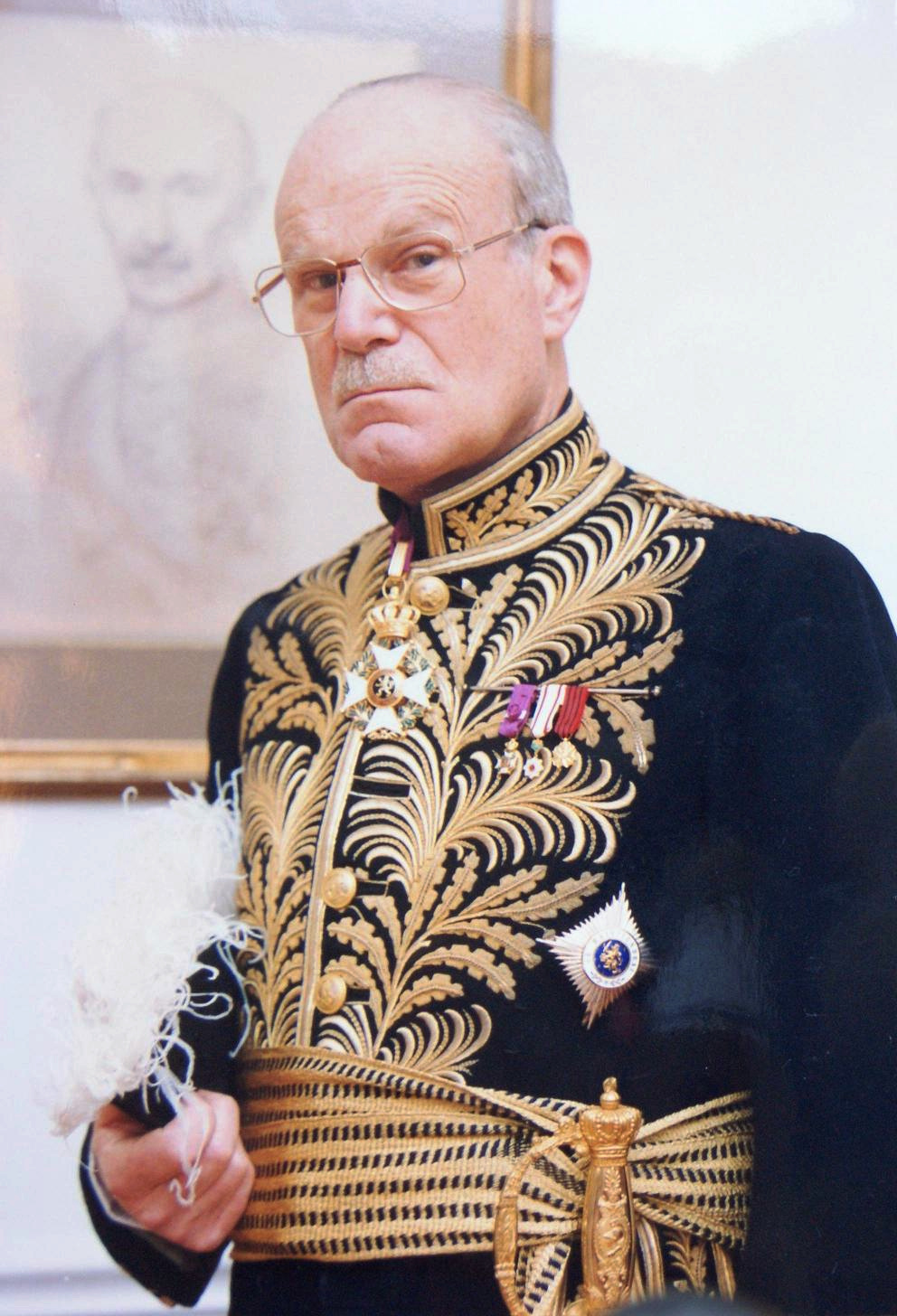
Baron Henri Beyens (born 1933), Belgian ambassador

Jean-Baptiste, named Albert Beyens (Brussels, 29 August 1910 – Neuilly-sur-Seine 26 June 2013) was the third son of Napoleon-Eugène Beyens. He married with Anne O'Connor (Paris 1910–2000).

His eldest son, Henri-Eugène Beyens (Etterbeek 3 April 1933 – Uccle, 30 April 2018) married in 1964 with the French engineer Marie-Térèse Henry (Nantes, 8 January 1935 – 2014) and entered the Belgian diplomatic service. His first post was in 1959 in Havana, where the regime of Fidel Castro had just started. He continued with assignments at the Belgian embassies in Paris, Islamabad, Tokyo, Rio de Janeiro and The Hague.

In 1987 he was appointed ambassador in Prague and lived there through the Velvet Revolution and the election to the presidency of Václav Havel. In 1991 he became director-general of policy at the Ministry of Foreign Affairs and ended his career as ambassador at the Holy See and UNESCO.

== Genealogy ==
- Livinus Beyens x Joanna Wanseel
  - Laurentius Beyens (Nazareth 28 March 1630) x Petronella Wouters (they had at least ten children)
    - Paulus Beyens (Nazareth 29th of oktober 1659) x Joanna Vermeersch
      - Franciscus Beyens (Nazareth 7 August 1691) x Josine (Judoca) Van Acker.
        - Petrus Beyens (Wontergem 21 January 1721)
        - Jean-François Beyens (Wontergem 18 January 1723)
        - Joseph Beyens (Wontergem 5 January 1725)
        - Jacobus Beyens (Wontergem 15 February 1727)
        - Petrus-Franciscus Beyens (Wontergem 16 February 1731 – Deinze 24 augustus 1794), x Marie-Jeanne Camberlyn (1724–1801)
          - Constant Beyens (1758–1808)
          - Albert Guillaume Beyens (1760–1827) x Suzanne Mouriau (1778–1814)
          - Henriette Beyens x Jean-Bernard Dubois
          - Eugène-François Beyens (1762–1793)
          - Jean-Baptiste-Justin Beyens (1766–1829) x Isabelle Fonteyne (1792-)
            - Hortense Beyens x Hubert Lambert de Stuers, Dutch general
            - baron Eugène Beyens (1816–1894) x Maria de las Mercedes Alcala Galiano y Valencia (1828–1917)
              - baron Napoleon-Eugène Beyens (1855–1934), x Marguerite Oppenheim (1871–1949)
                - baron Antoine-Nicolas Beyens (1906–1995) x Simonne Goüin (1911–1991)
                  - baron Christian Beyens (1938–1986) x Beatrice Elleboudt (°1939)
                  - baron François Beyens (°1941) x Chuan Wu (1951–)
                  - baron Ghislain Beyens (1953– 2001)
                - baron Jean-Baptiste, dit Albert Beyens (1910–2000) x Anne O'Connor (1910–2000).
                  - baron Henri-Eugène Beyens (1933–) x Marie-Térèse Henry 1935–2014)
                    - baron Emmanuel Beyens (1968–) x Gianna-Lia Cogliandro (1967–)
              - baron Hubert Beyens (1861–1946) x Alina de Mot (1867–1958)
                - baron Serge Beyens (1891–1943)

== Sources ==
- The parish registers of Nazareth, Wontergem, Deinze, etc., give decisive answers regarding the official descendance of this Beyens family, and is proof that it has nothing to do with the family Beyens de Grambais from Brabant and also not with the Antwerp family Beyens of whom a branch was ennobled in Spain.
- The Library of the University of Ghent keeps archives related to the Beyens family, more in particular the writings of lawyer and president of the court Albert Beyens.

== Literature ==
=== Beyens, the lawyers ===
- Mémoire contenant la réfutation des faits et moyens allégués par les sieurs Jos. Thys et consors, Ghent, 1847.
- Eugène Coemans, Albert Beyens, in: Biographie nationale de Belgique, T. II, Brussels, 1868, col. 401–403.
- Eugène Coemans, Jean Beyens, in: Biographie nationale de Belgique, T. II, Brussels, 1868, col. 401–403.
- A. Schillings, Matricule de l'université de Louvain, Tome IX (30 août 1776-11 novembre 1789), Brussels, 1967.
- Philippe van Hille, Het Hof van Beroep te Brussel en de rechtbanken van Oost- en West-Vlaanderen onder het Frans Bewind, Handzame, 1970.
- Conny Devolder, De notabelen van het keizerrijk (1804–1814). Het Scheldedepartement, in: Handelingen van de maatschappij voor geschiedenis en oudheidkunde in Gent, 1991.
- René de Clercq, Vrijmetselaars in Groot-Deinze voor 1830, Deinze, 1991–1994
- Guy Schrans, Vrijmetselarij te Gent in de XVIIIe eeuw, Gent, 1997 and 2009
- Conny Devolder, Grands notables du Premier Empire. Volume 28, Escaut, C. N. R. S., Paris, 2001
- Walter Prevenier & Romain van Eenoo (dir.), Geschiedenis van Deinze, Deinze, Vol. I, 2003 – Vol. II, 2005 – Vol. III, 2007.
- Herman Maes, Over de notarissen in Deinze, in: Bijdragen tot de geschiedenis van Deinze en de Leiestreek, 2009, p. 13–57
- Guido Demuynck, Inleiding tot de geschiedenis van het notariaat te Deinze, VVF Deinze, 2011.
- Bart Coppein en Jérôme de Brouwer, Histoire du barreau de Bruxelles / 1811–2011 / Geschiedenis van de balie van Brussel, Brussels, Bruylant, 2012, blz. 28, 33, 39.

=== Beyens, the diplomats ===
- Isidore de Stein d'Altenstein, Annuaire de la noblesse de Belgique, Bruxelles, 1852, p. 111–115.
- Charles Poplimont, La Belgique héraldique, Tome I, A-Bi, Bruxelles, 1863. Poplimont acquired a solid reputation of falsifying genealogies. It was also here the case.
- Felix Victor Goethals, Archéologie des familles de Belgique, première livraison, Brussels, Imprimerie de Polach-Duvivier, 1864, p. 98–101.
- Paul Bourget, Un diplomate belge à Berlin, in: L'Illustration, 26 décembre 1931.
- Baron Beyens, Un diplomate au service de son pays. Le baron Beyens, ministre des Affaires étrangères, Brussels, no date.
- État Présent de la noblesse du Royaume de Belgique, Editions Tradition et Vie, Brussels, 1960
- Fernand van Langenhove, Eugène Beyens, in: Biographie nationale de Belgique, T. XXXIV, Brussels, 1967–68, col. 71–79
- Oscar Coomans de Brachène, État présent de la noblesse belge, Annuaire 1984, Brussels, 1984
- Paul Janssens & Luc Duerloo, Armorial de la noblesse belge, Brussels, 1992.
- Oscar Coomans de Brachène, État présent de la noblesse belge, Annuaire 2003, Brussels, 2003
- Henri Beyens, Aux avant-postes de la diplomatie. Le baron Beyens, ministre de Belgique à Berlin (1912-1914), in: Bulletin de l'Association de la Noblesse, 2014.
- Andries Van den Abeele, Nazareth zendt zijn zonen uit. Beyens: van landbouwers tot ambassadeurs, in: Kring voor geschiedenis van kunst en geschiedenis van Deinze en de Leiestraat, 2017.
- Bertrand MAUS de Rolley e.a., État présent de la noblesse belge, Annuaire de 2017, A-Bi, Bruxelles, 2017.
