= Battle of the Sambre (1918) =

1918 battle during the First World War

Coordinates: 50.4667°N 4.86667°E

- Part of the Western Front of World War I
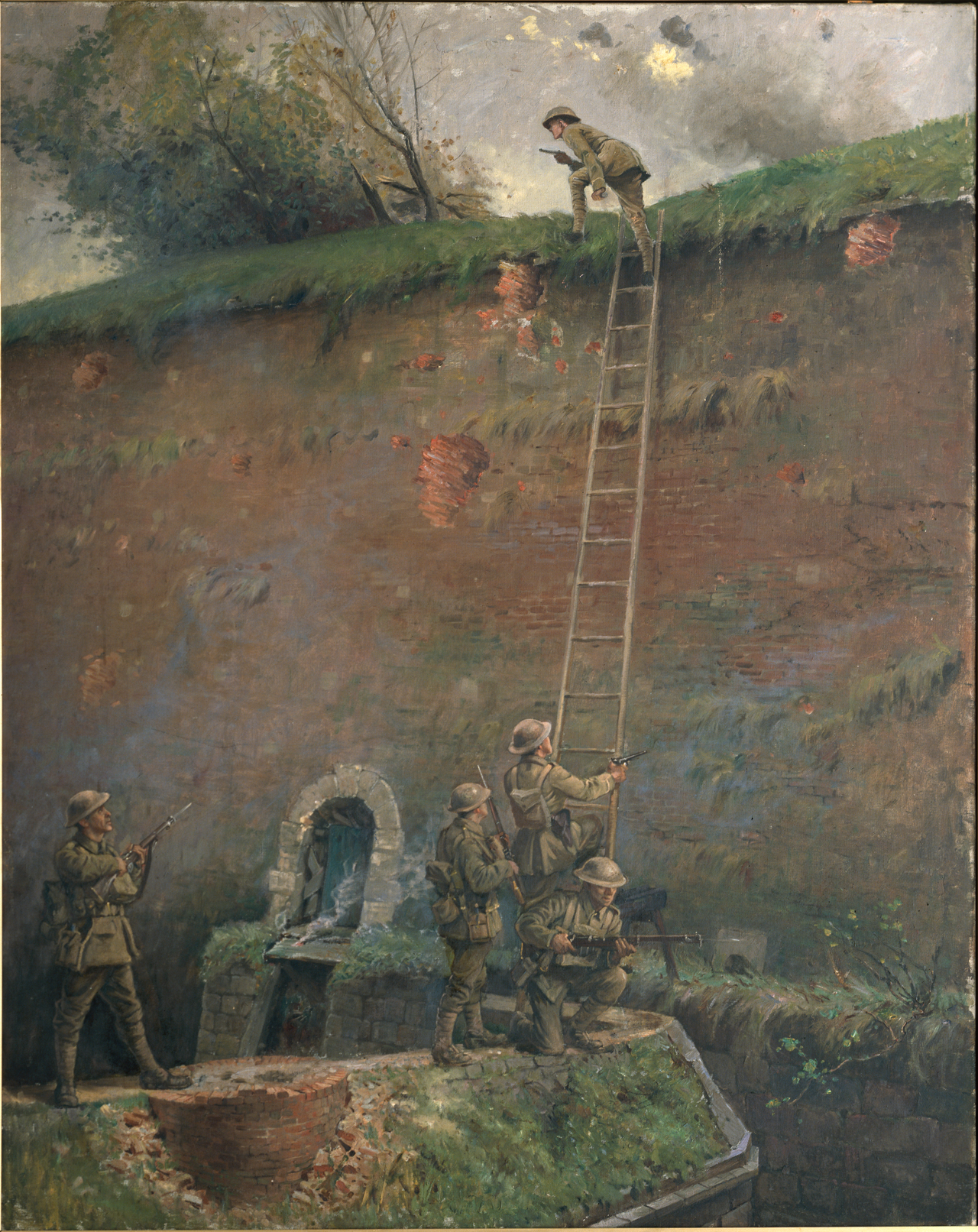
- The scaling of the walls of Le Quesnoy by New Zealand troops; painting by George Edmund Butler
Date	4 November 1918
Location	River Sambre, France
Result	Allied victory

Belligerents
British Empire: United Kingdom; Canada; New Zealand; France; United States	German Empire

Strength
(British Empire) 17 divisions (French Third Republic) 11 divisions (United States) Unknown 37 tanks	(German Empire) 17th Army (German Empire) 2nd Army

Casualties and losses
Unknown	Unknown

The Second Battle of the Sambre (4 November 1918) (which included the Second Battle of Guise (French: 2ème Bataille de Guise) and the Battle of Thiérache (French: Bataille de Thiérache) was part of the final European Allied offensives of World War I.

== Background ==
At the front, German resistance was falling away. Unprecedented numbers of prisoners were taken in the Battle of the Selle, and a new attack was quickly prepared. The French First Army and the British First, Third, and Fourth Armies were tasked with advancing from south of the Condé Canal along a 30-mile (48 km) front toward Maubeuge-Mons, threatening Namur. Together with the American forces breaking out of the forests of Argonne, this would, if successful, disrupt the German efforts to reform a shortened defensive line along the Meuse.

At dawn on 4 November, 17 British divisions (including the 3rd and 4th Canadian Divisions of the Canadian Corps assigned to the British First Army) and 11 French divisions headed the attack. The Tank Corps, its resources badly stretched, could provide only 37 tanks for support.

== Battle ==
The first barrier to the northern attack was the 60–70-foot-wide (18–21 m) Sambre Canal and the flooded ground around it. It was there that the BEF had fought over four years earlier. The XIII and IX Corps reached the canal first. German guns quickly ranged the attackers, and bodies piled up before the temporary bridges were properly emplaced under heavy fire. The 1st and 32nd Divisions of IX Corps lost around 1,150 men in the crossing, including celebrated war poet Wilfred Owen. Even after the crossing the German forces defended in depth amid the small villages and fields, and it was not until midday that a 2-mile-deep (3 km) by 15-mile-wide (24 km) breach was secured. Lieutenant Colonel D.G. Johnson was awarded the Victoria Cross for leading the 2nd Battalion Sussex Regiment's crossing of the canal.

Further north, IV and V Corps attacked into Forêt de Mormal and the Canadian Corps towards the direction of Mons. The Germans defence was haphazard: the 13th Royal Welsh Fusiliers hardly needed to use their guns, while the 9th Battalion of the 17th Division lost all but two officers and 226 of 583 soldiers. Despite this, the advance continued and the battle objectives were reached on the 4th or the following day. The town of Le Quesnoy, to the west of Forêt de Mormal, was captured by the New Zealand Division.

To the south, the French First Army attacked, capturing the communes of Guise (the Second Battle of Guise) and Origny-en-Thiérache (the Battle of Thiérache).

This resulted in a bridgehead almost 50 miles (80 km) long being made, to a depth of 2–3 miles (3–5 km).

From this point, the northern Allies advanced relentlessly, sometimes more than five miles a day, until the Armistice Line of 11 November from Ghent, through Hourain, Bauffe, Havré, to near Consoire, and Sivry.
