= Jules Van den Heuvel =

Belgian politician

Jules van den Heuvel
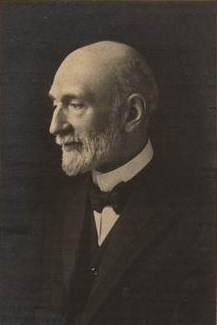

Minister of Justice
- In office 5 August 1899 – 2 May 1907

Minister of State
- Incumbent
- Assumed office 1908

Personal details
- Born: Jules Norbert Marie van den Heuvel; 16 November 1854 Ghent
- Died: 22 October 1926 (aged 71) Ghent
- Spouse: y
- Children: Suzanne Van den Heuvel/Struye; Mérinette Van den Heuvel (1895-1985)

Jules Van den Heuvel (16 November 1854 – 22 October 1926) was a Roman Catholic politician from Ghent in Belgium.

He also made his mark as a university lecturer in public law and, more generally, as an academic. Between 1915 and 1918 Van den Heuvel served as his war ravaged country's diplomatic representative to the Holy See.

== Early life ==
He was not born into a wealthy family. His parents ran a shop selling knitted goods. His parents were deeply affected by the death in quick succession of their three elder children from croup, and Jules was sent away to live with an aunt in Bernissart for a few years before he returned to Ghent, where the educational possibilities were better. There was nothing about his early years to mark him out as a future top politician.

== Education ==
Van de Heuvel attended the Sint-Barbaracollege, a Jesuit secondary school in Ghent before he moved on in 1873 to Ghent University, where he studied Law, and where fellow students included the future politician Albert Nyssens. Van den Heuvel obtained doctorates in both Law, and in Political and Administrative Sciences. He also obtained a substantial bursary that enabled him to study abroad. He pursued his further studies at universities in Paris, Berlin and Rome and studied The Obstruction of Justice in England. In 1879, he was admitted to the bar in Ghent. Meanwhile, he also joined with another future national politician, Paul de Smet de Naeyer and with Albert Nyssens to found in Ghent the Catholic newspaper, L'Impartial.

== Academic lawyer-politician ==
Despite being politically active in East Flanders, he found time to launch himself on an academic career, becoming in 1883 Professor of Public Law at the Catholic University of Louvain. He would continue to teach the subject for thirty years. He was also energetic in his promotion of the university's School of Political and Social Sciences, and he pioneered the teaching of Comparative Law. He soon built a reputation which contributed to his nomination in 1899 to a government position as extraparliamentary Minister of Justice in the Catholic Party government led by Paul de Smet de Naeyer.

An activist Justice Minister, he remained in his post until May 1907. His eight years were characterised by abundant "hard work and personal charm" (huit années pleines de labour et de charme), highlights included pushing through reforms in respect Labour laws, gambling, Credit unions, Navigation law, Divorce law, Paternity law and corporate governance. Of at least as much interest as any of those projects for many contemporary sources was the so-called Royal Donation whereby royal assets, mostly land and buildings, was transferred from the king to the state, subject to various exceptions and restrictions covering matters such as the inalienability of the assets. That removed the risks arising from royal assets in Belgium from coming into the ownership of the king's three daughters and their foreign husbands. As Justice Minister, Van den Heuvel was closely involved in negotiating and drafting the necessary settlements, which also, in some respects, provided templates for the transfer in 1908 of the distant and inaccessible Congo Free State from the king's personal asset portfolio to the Belgian state as the Belgian Congo.

After eight years at the Justice Ministry, van den Heuvel resigned his office in May 1907, which coincided with a change of prime minister though not of the ruling party. He was a Belgian delegate to the Second International Peace Conference at The Hague between June and October 1907 and thereafter remained an active member of the political establishment. He was nominated a Minister of State in 1908. "Minister of State" in Belgium may be described as an honorary title, but during the years that followed, Van den Heuvel was deeply involved in attempts to improve the conditions of the Belgian Congo. A few years later, in 1914, together with Paul Hymans and Henri Carton de Wiart, Jules Van den Heuvel drafted the Belgian reply to the German Ultimatum which preceded the German invasion of Belgium and so for Britain and France military participation in the First World War.

== Honours and an ambassadorship ==
Beyond the world of politics, on 8 May 1908, Van de Heuvel was elected a corresponding member of Belgium's Royal Academy and became a full member on 5 May 1919. When war broke out in August 1914, he followed the government when it relocated to Antwerp, and then into exile in Normandy. In 1915 the Prime Minister, Charles de Broqueville appointed him as the country's Minister Plenipotentiary to the Holy See, a de facto ambassadorship that he retained until 1918.

== Postwar ==
After the war ended, he attended the Paris Peace Conference, at the request of the Foreign Ministry and drew up the schedule of damages suffered by Belgium. He chaired one of the three sections of the allied Reparations Commission. His contribution was cut short, however, when he suddenly resigned his political duties and from his university teaching on health grounds.

== Family ==
- His daughter Suzanne married Paul Struye (1896-1974), who later became a senior Belgian politician himself.
- His other daughter, Mérinette Van den Heuvel, was politically active and an energetic campaigner for various social causes.
