= Boeyens =

Boeyens is a surname. Notable people with the surname include:

- Adriaan Florenszoon Boeyens (1459–1523), birth name of Pope Adrian VI
- Jan C. A. Boeyens (1934–2015), South African chemist and educator

== See also ==
- Beyens
- Boelens
- Boyens
