= Pommerœul =

Section of Bernissart, Wallonia, Belgium

- Sub-municipality of Bernissart
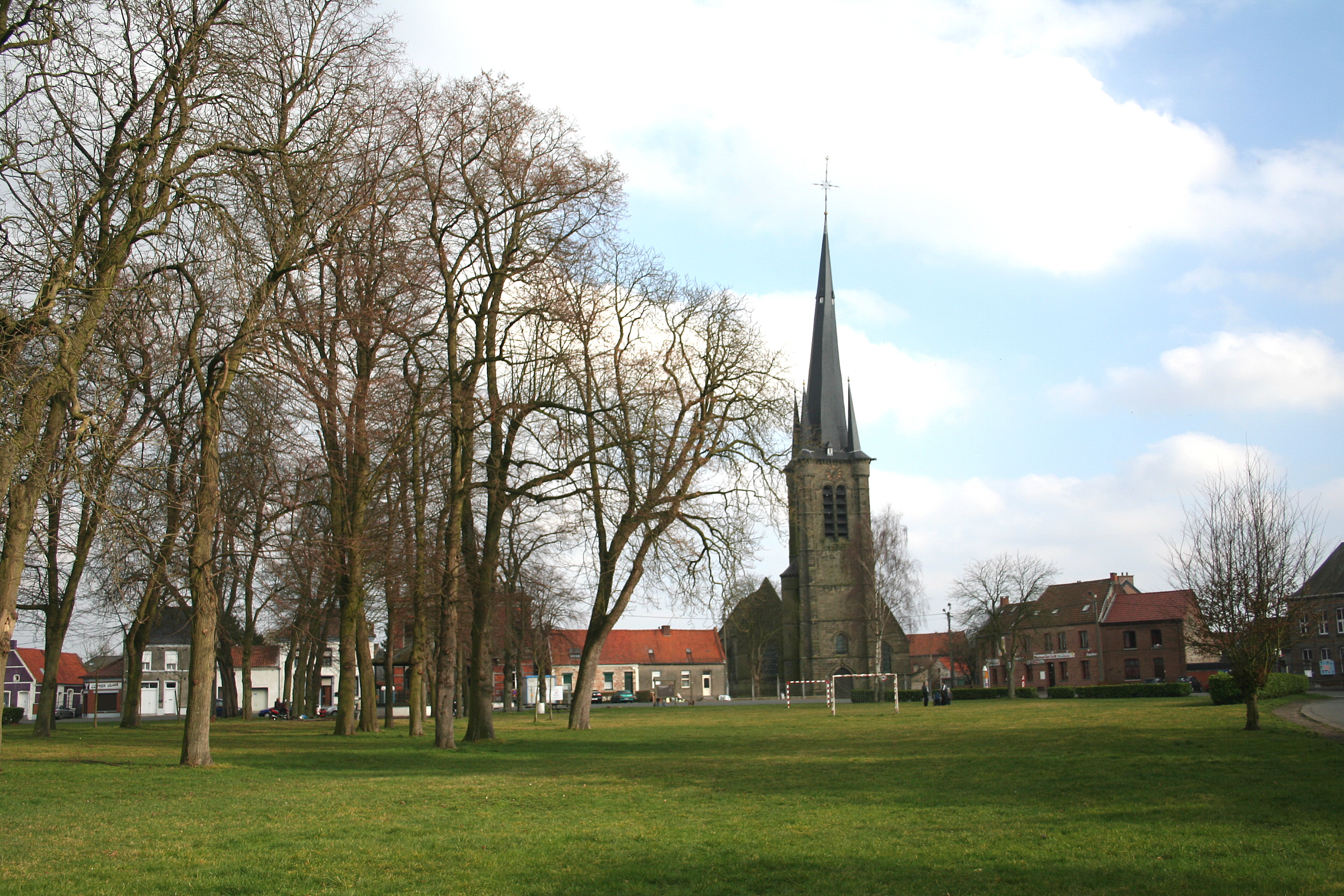
- The Church.

- Location within Belgium Location within Hainaut (Belgium)
- Coordinates: 50°27′N 03°42′E
- Country: Belgium
- Community: French Community
- Region: Wallonia
- Province: Hainaut
- Arrondissement: Ath
- Municipality: Ath

Area
  - Total: 16.39 km^{2} (6.33 sq mi)

Population (2020-01-01)
  - Total: 2,517
  - Density: 154/km^{2} (400/sq mi)
- Postal codes: 7322
- Area codes: 065

Pommerœul is a village of Wallonia and a district of the municipality of Bernissart located in the province of Hainaut, Belgium.

It was a separate municipality until it merged in 1977. It is known for its Gallo-Roman ruins.

== Geography ==
Its altitude ranges from 17 meters at the level of the Pommerœul-Condé Canal to 81 meters in Stambruges forest.

It is crossed by several waterways: the Nimy-Blaton-Péronnes in the center, Pommerœul-Antoing and Pommerœul-Condé Canal to the west, as well as the Haine to the southeast. It sits 29 km from Tournai and 18 km from Mons.

== Transport ==
Pommerœul is served by Line 78, with a train station located in the center of the village, as well as by the N50 road and the E42 and E19 motorways.

== History ==
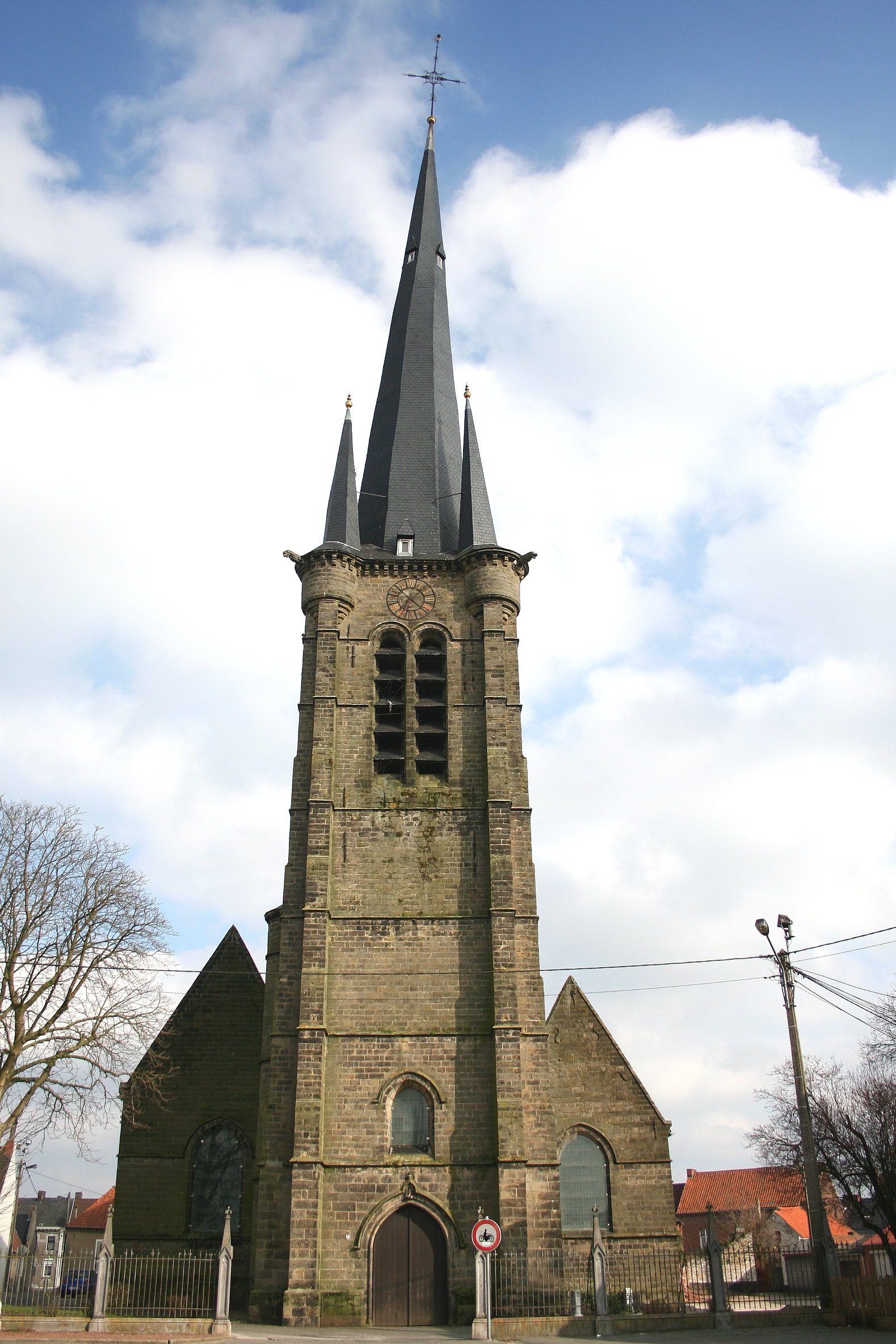
Pommerœul, the Church of Our Lady (15th century).

Important archaeological excavations took place there in July 1975 after the discovery of ancient remains during the digging of the Pommerœul-Condé Canal. The oldest remains belong to the La Tène period. Most remains show evidence of a port town that developed from the 1st to the 3rd century at the intersection of the Bavay/Blicquy road and the Haine, which was navigable at that time. One of the items found is unique in Belgium: a barge (a flat-bottomed boat, precursor of today's barges). The site is not listed. The barge and other objects found during the excavations are displayed at the Gallo-Roman Space in Ath.

On 24 August 1914, the German Imperial Army executed 15 civilians and destroyed 23 houses during the German atrocities at the beginning of the invasion. The responsible unit may have been the 165th Infantry Regiment.

== Gallery ==
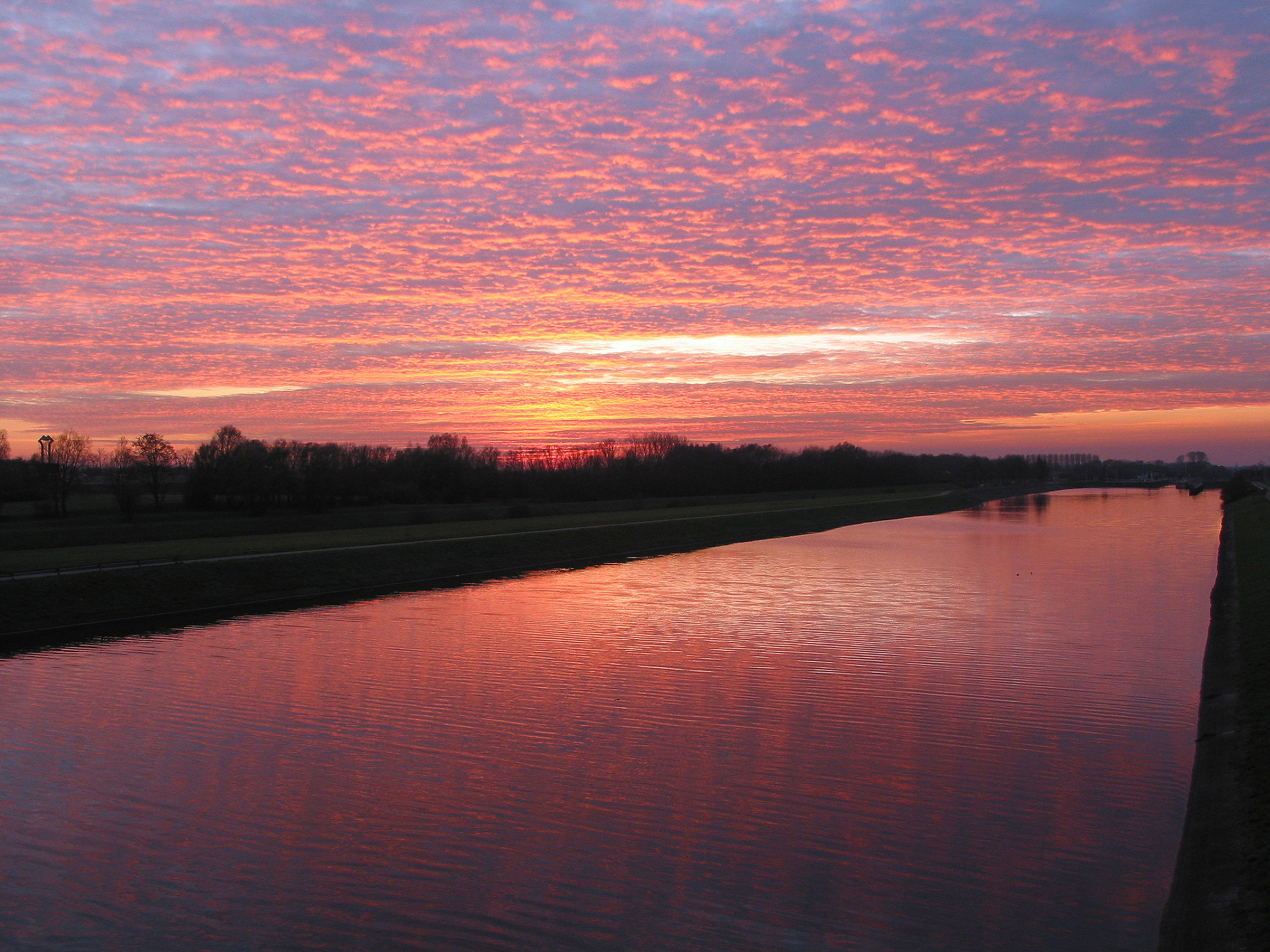
Pommerœul-Condé canal

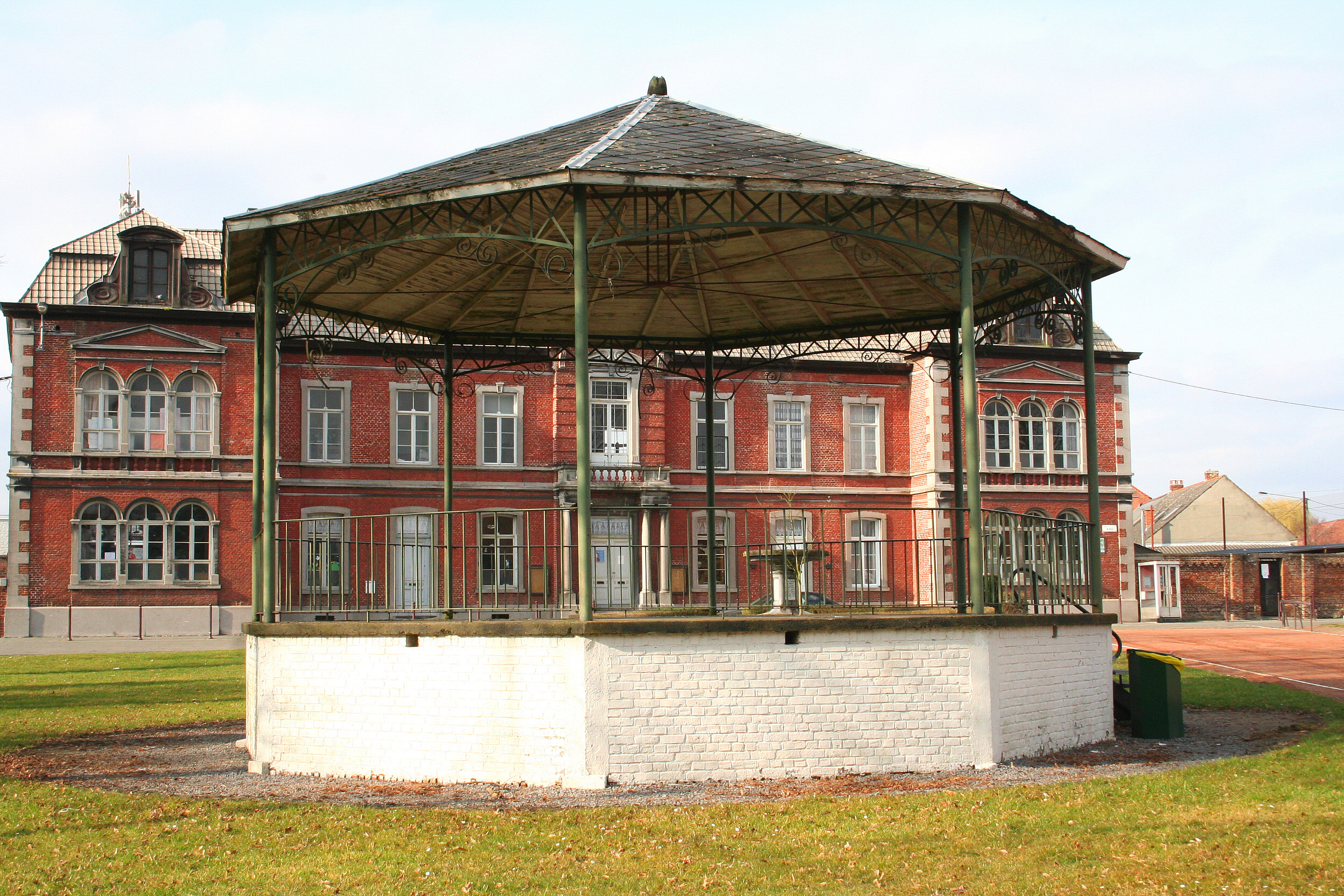
The bandstand

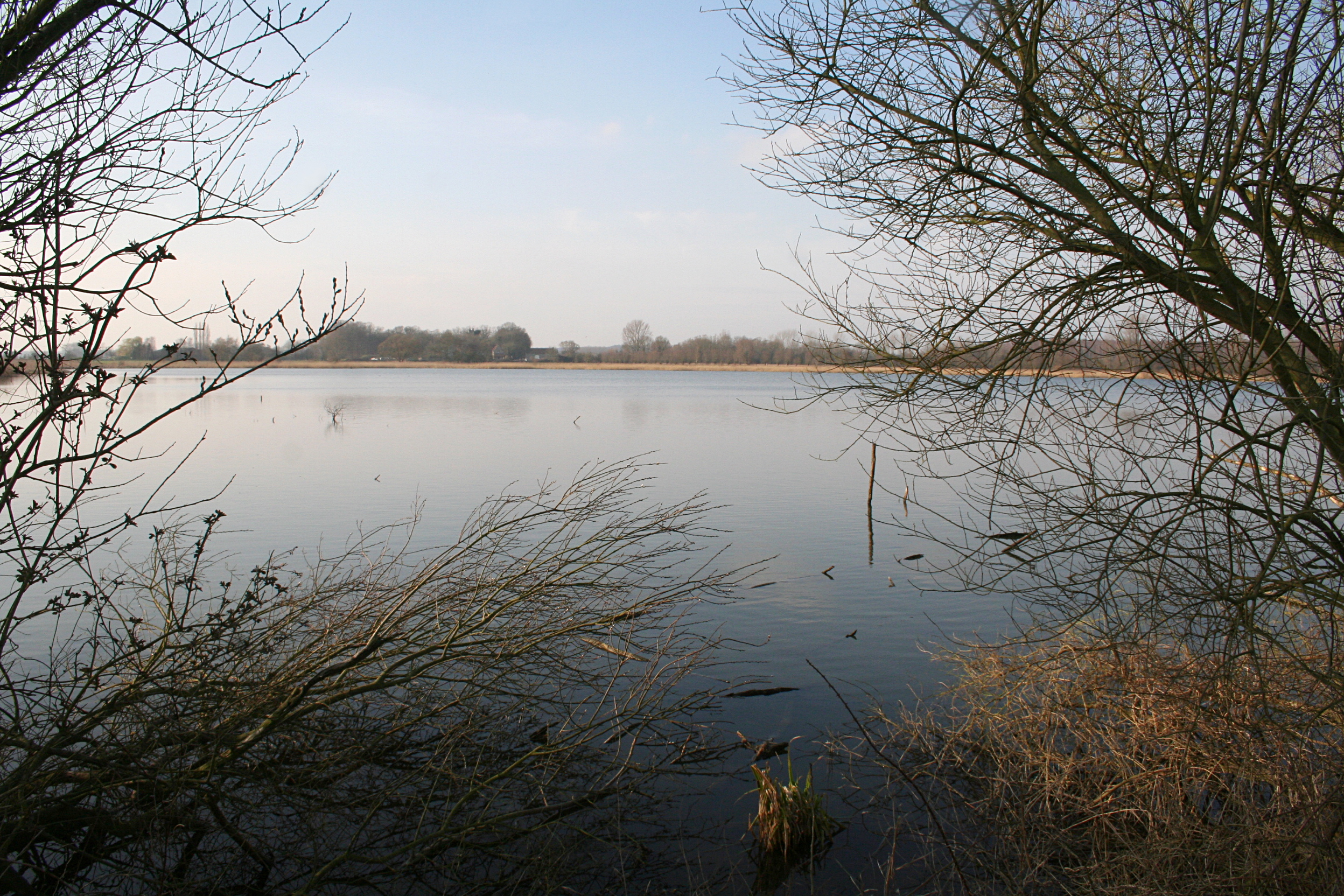
The Harchies Marshes

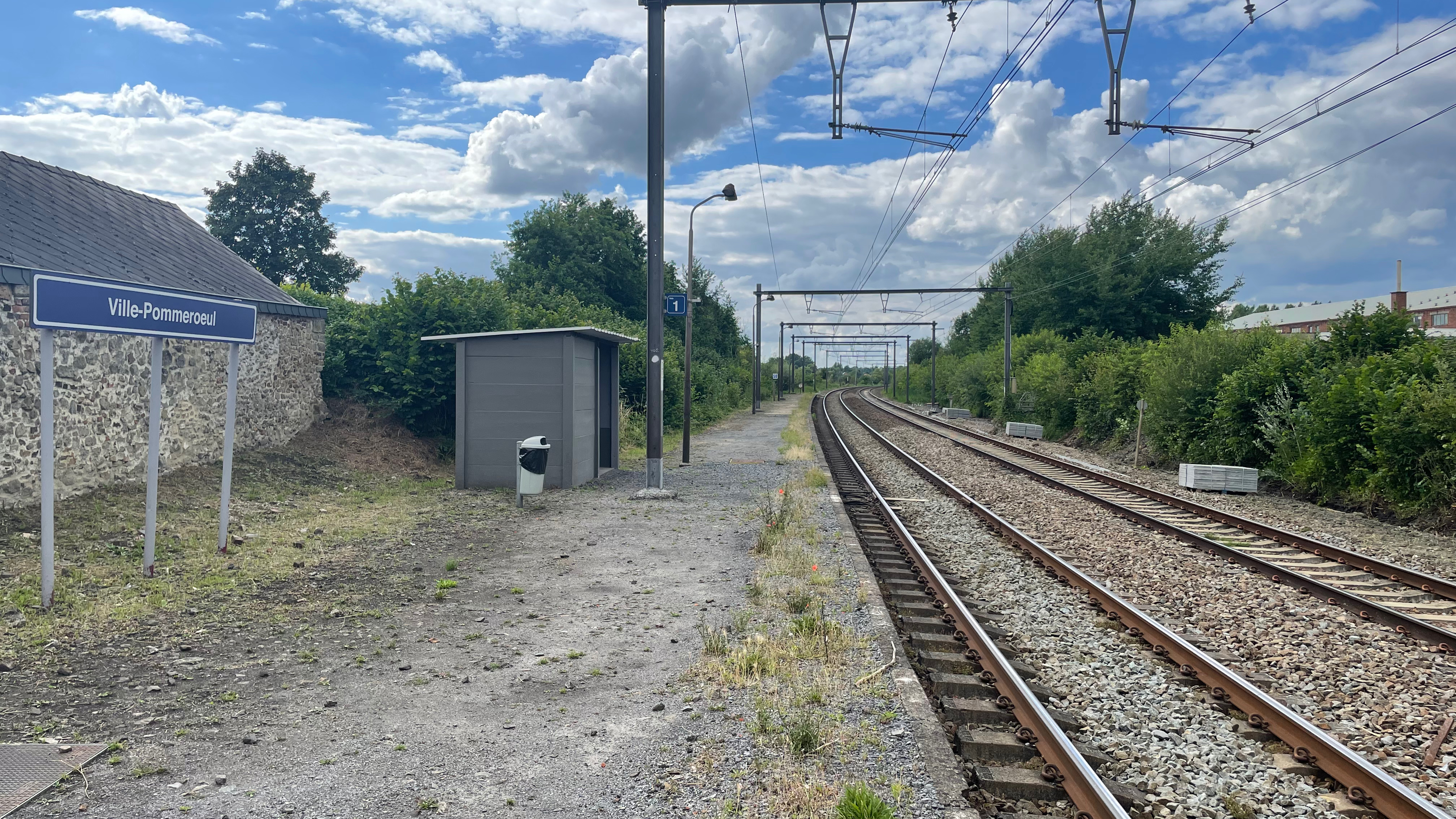
Pommerœul station
