= Harchies =

Section of Bernissart in Wallonia, Belgium

- Sub-municipality of Bernissart
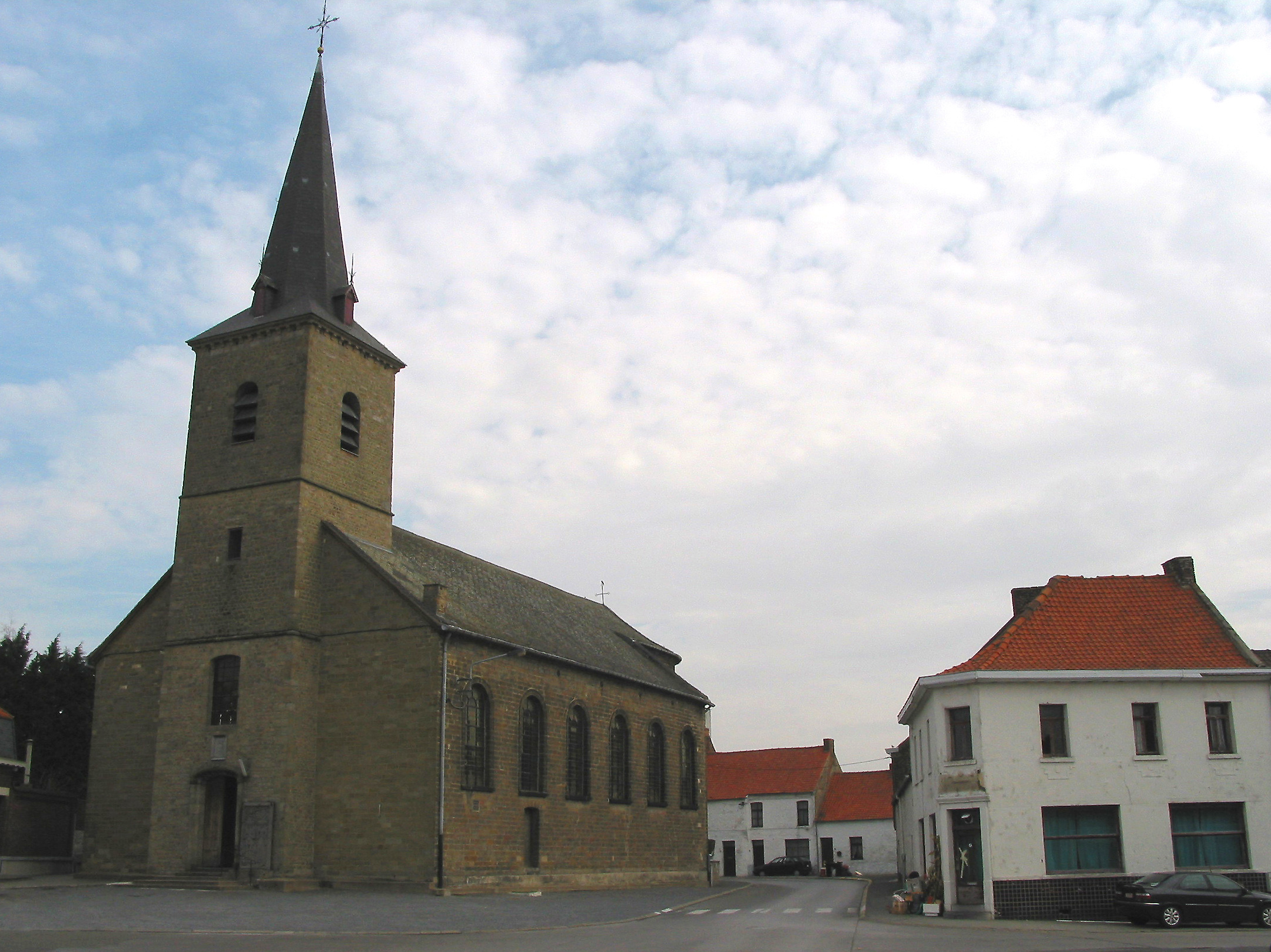
- The Holy Virgin church

- Location within Belgium Location within Hainaut (Belgium)
- Coordinates: 50°28′N 03°41′E
- Country: Belgium
- Community: French Community
- Region: Wallonia
- Province: Hainaut
- Arrondissement: Ath
- Municipality: Ath

Area
  - Total: 5.10 km^{2} (1.97 sq mi)

Population (2020-01-01)
  - Total: 1,771
  - Density: 347/km^{2} (900/sq mi)
- Postal codes: 7321
- Area codes: 069

Harchies is a village of Wallonia and a district of the municipality of Bernissart located in the province of Hainaut, Belgium.

In 1964, it merged with Bernissart, and then, in 1977, the latter merged again with several neighboring municipalities to form the current municipality, during the municipality mergers in Belgium.

== Toponymy ==
A late Gallo-Roman formation in -IACAS, a suffix derived from IACU, of Gallic origin *-āko, indicating ownership. The distribution of -IACAS is limited to the far north of France (Picardy, Normandy...) and Belgium. It explains most of the toponymic formations in -ies.

It generally combines with a personal name of Germanic origin and, more rarely, Roman origin.

Harchies would trace back to a toponymic type *HARICIACAS, based on the Germanic anthroponym Haricho.

== History ==
In 1138, the Bishop of Cambrai granted the Harchies altar and its dependencies to the Abbey of Saint-Ghislain in Hainaut.

== Gallery ==
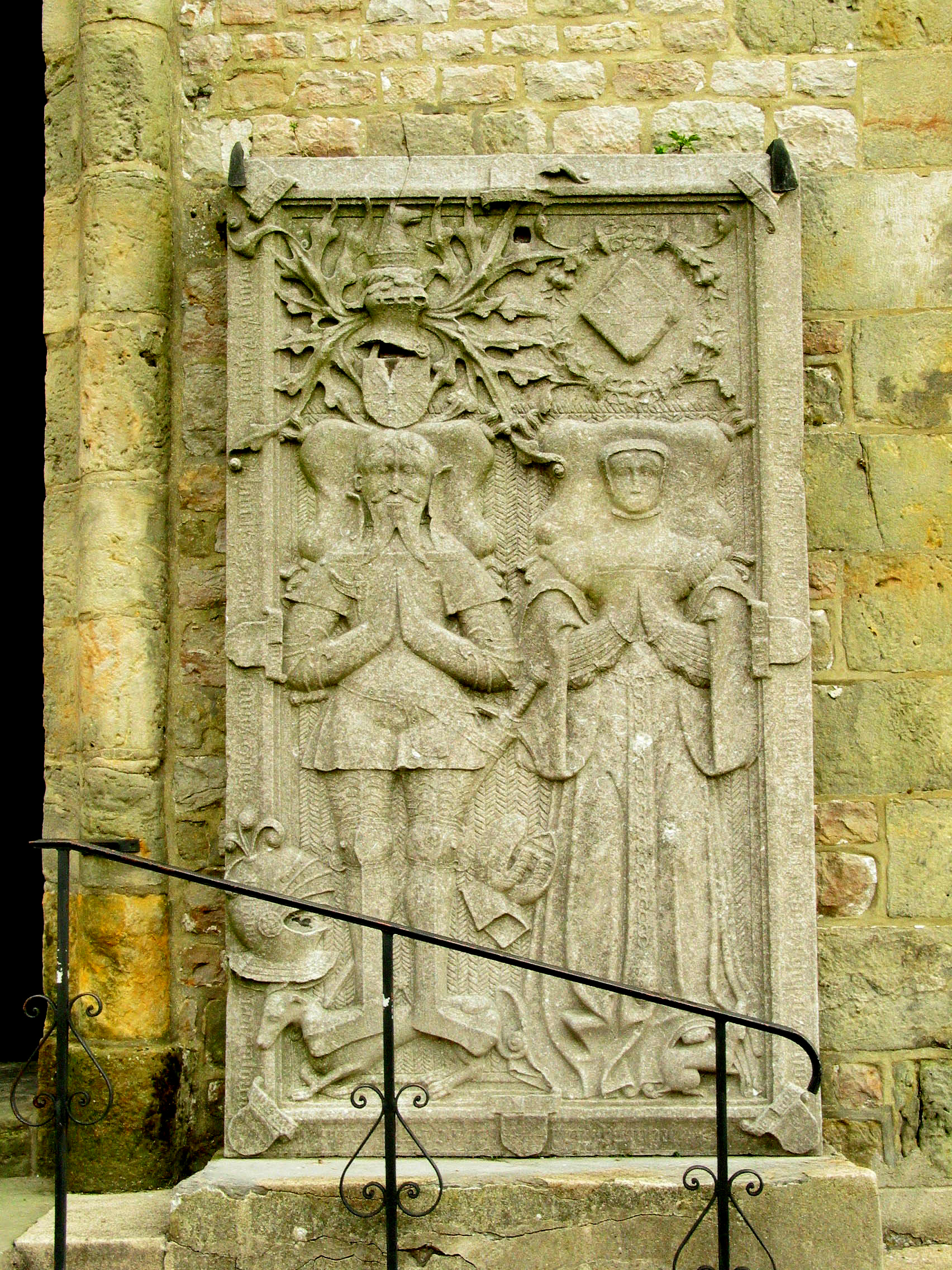
The funerary stele of Charles Faily Lord and his wife.

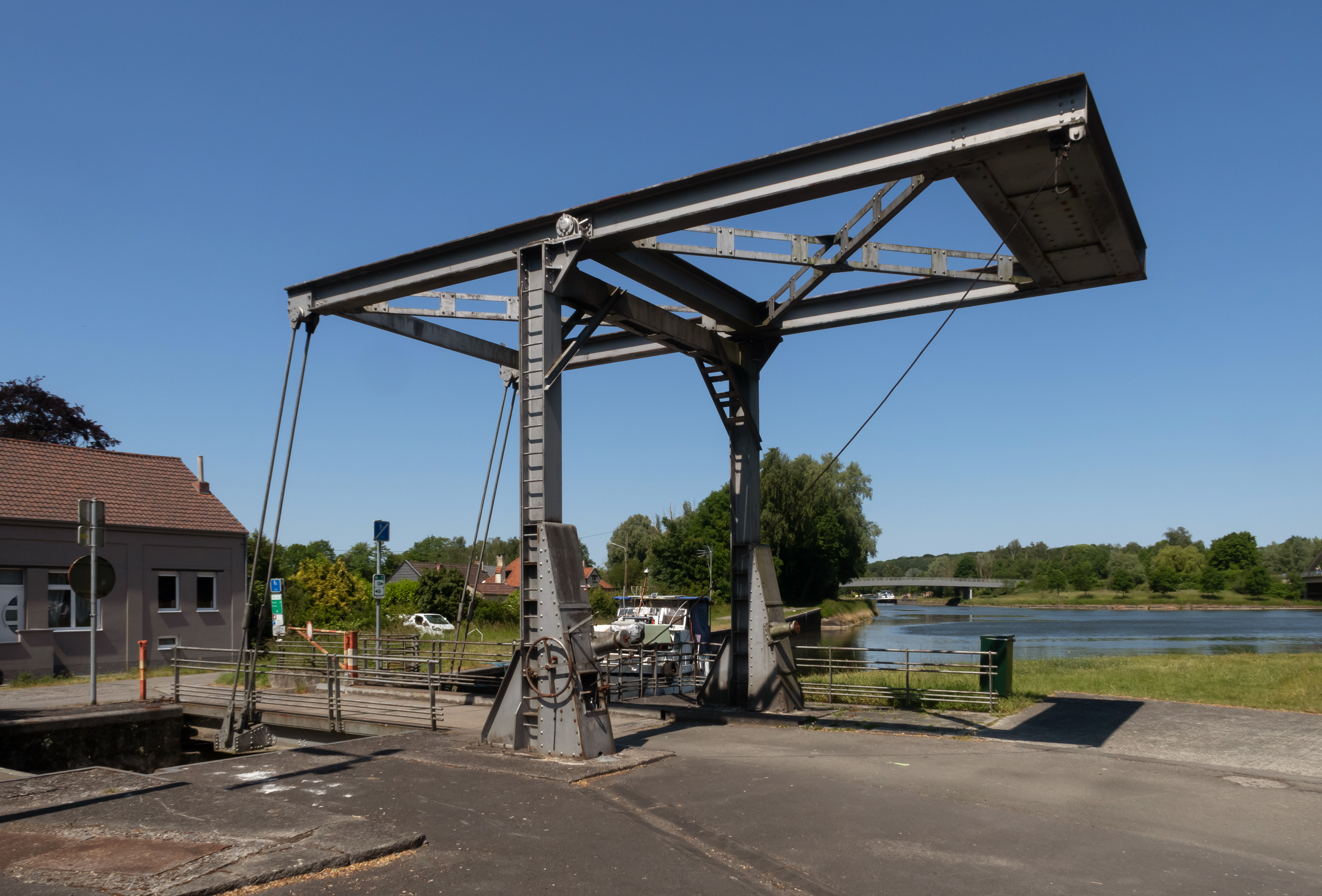
The drawbridge.

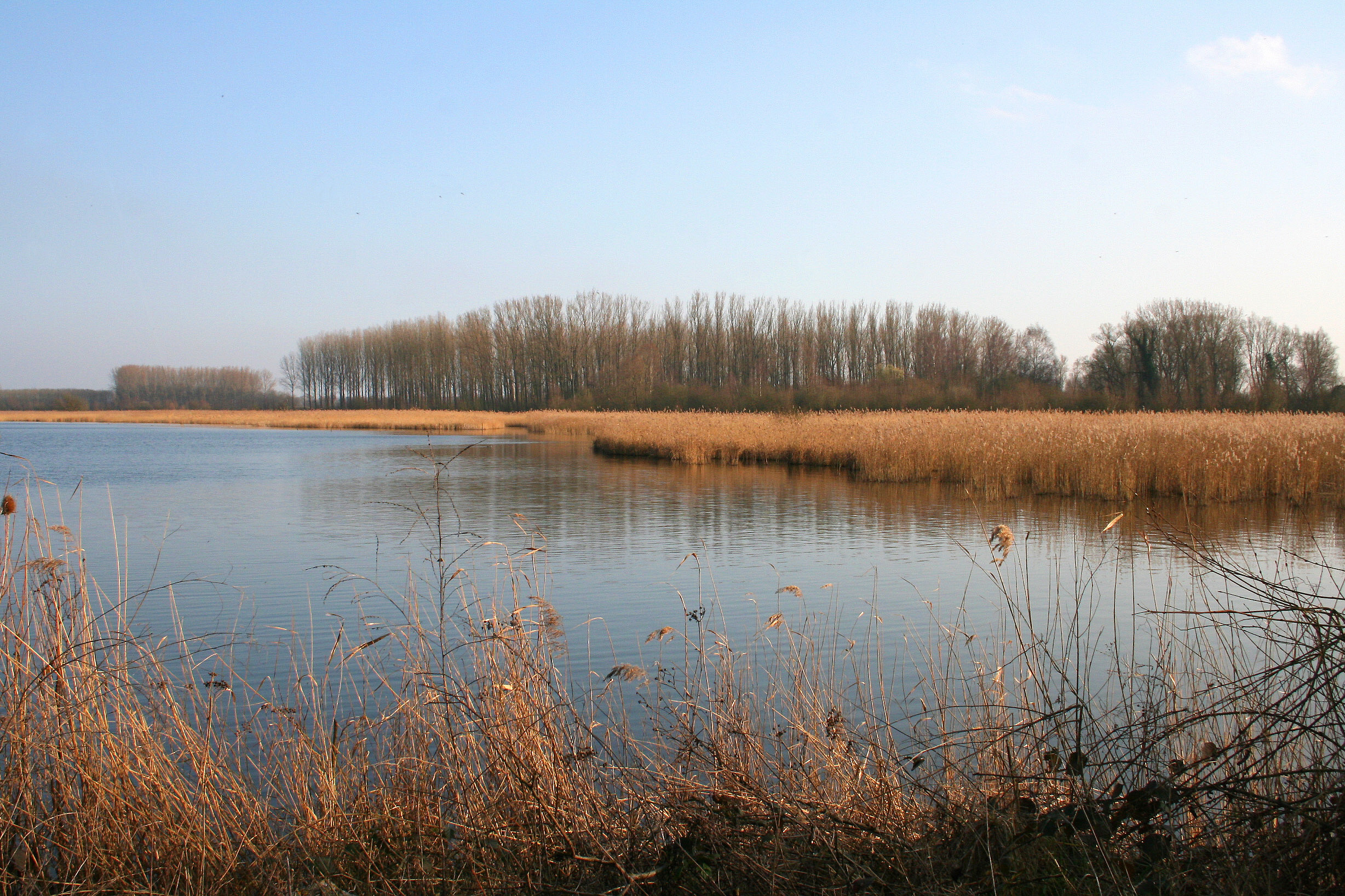
The Harchies Marshes.

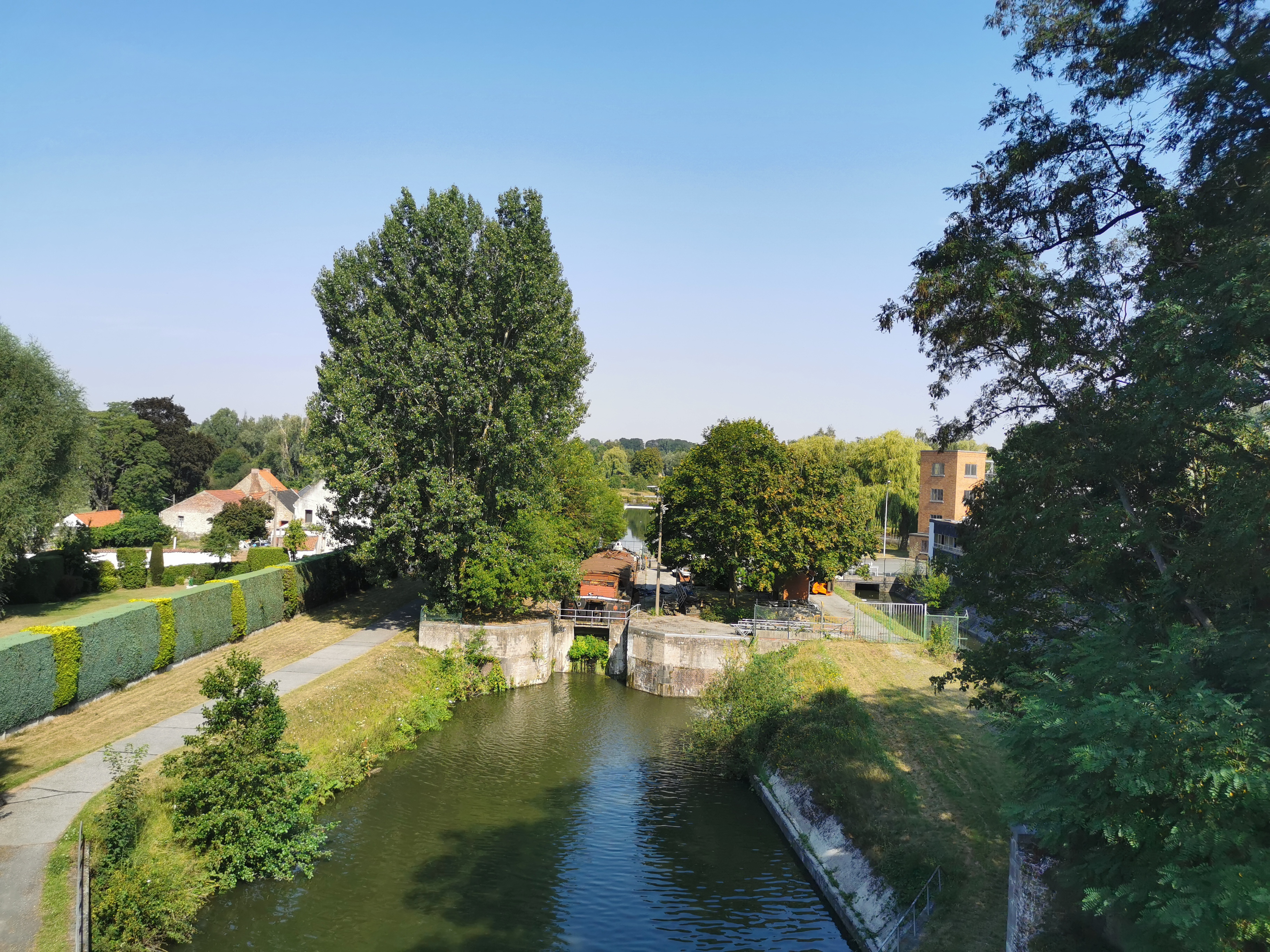
The Pommerœul-Antoing canal.

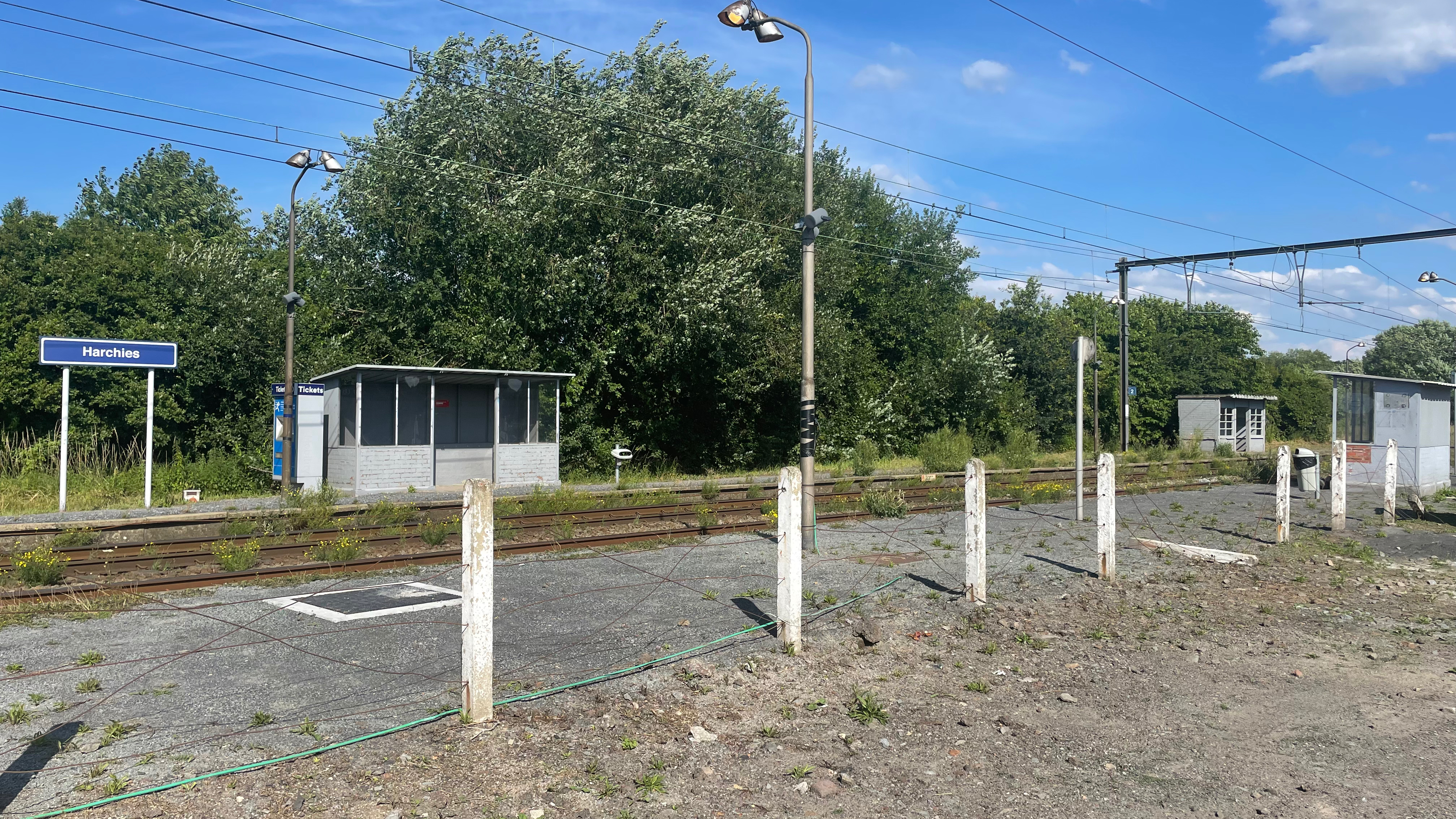
The station.
