= Boelens =

Boelens is a surname. Notable people with the surname include:

- Mischa Boelens (born 1995), Curaçaoan footballer
- Boelens Loen, Dutch patrician family of Amsterdam

== See also ==
- Boelen
- Boeyens
