= Boelen =

Boelen is a surname. Notable people with the surname include:

- Femke Boelen (born 1968), Dutch rower
- Henricus Boelen (1697–1755), American silversmith
- Herman Boelen (born 1939), Dutch rower
- Jacob Boelen (c.1657–1729), American silversmith
- Jan Boelen (born 1967), Belgian designer

== See also ==
- Boelens
