= Frank De Coninck =

Belgian diplomat (1945–2022)

Frank De Coninck (11 February 1945 – 11 March 2022) was a Belgian diplomat, who served as the ambassador to the Holy See from 26 October 2006 until his retirement in February 2010. Before this he was Marshal of the Royal Household of the Royal Court of Belgium (2002–2006).

== Early life and education ==
De Coninck was born in Blankenberge on 11 February 1945. He graduated in history at the University of Ghent (1968).

== Career ==
From 1968 till 1975 De Coninck was a teacher of history in Congo. He started a career in Belgian diplomacy in 1975 and has been assigned from 1976 till 2000 to diplomatic posts in Barcelona, Nairobi, Islamabad, Rome (the Vatican), Dakar, The Hague, and both Kigali and Kinshasa as ambassador. His last duty before he became Marshal of the Royal Household was at the Central Administration of the Belgian Foreign Ministry, where he was appointed special envoy for the Great Lakes (Central Africa). As Marshal of the Royal Household he was also head of the management council of the Royal Trust.

He was president of Caritas International Belgium and Cercle Royal Africain et de l’Outre Mer.

== Personal life ==
De Coninck died in Woluwe-Saint-Lambert on 11 March 2022, at the age of 77.

== Honours ==
- Grand Cross of the Order of Leopold of Belgium, by Royal Decree.
- Grand Cross of the Order of the Crown of Belgium, by Royal Decree of 19 December 2001.
- Knight of Grand Cross of the Order of Pope Pius IX of the Vatican or the Holy See
- Knight of Grand Cross of the Order of Merit of the Italian Republic of Italy, Decree of 14 October 2002.

== Sources ==
- Belgium's new Ambassadors abroad
