= H. J. J. L. de Stuers =

Royal Netherlands East Indies general

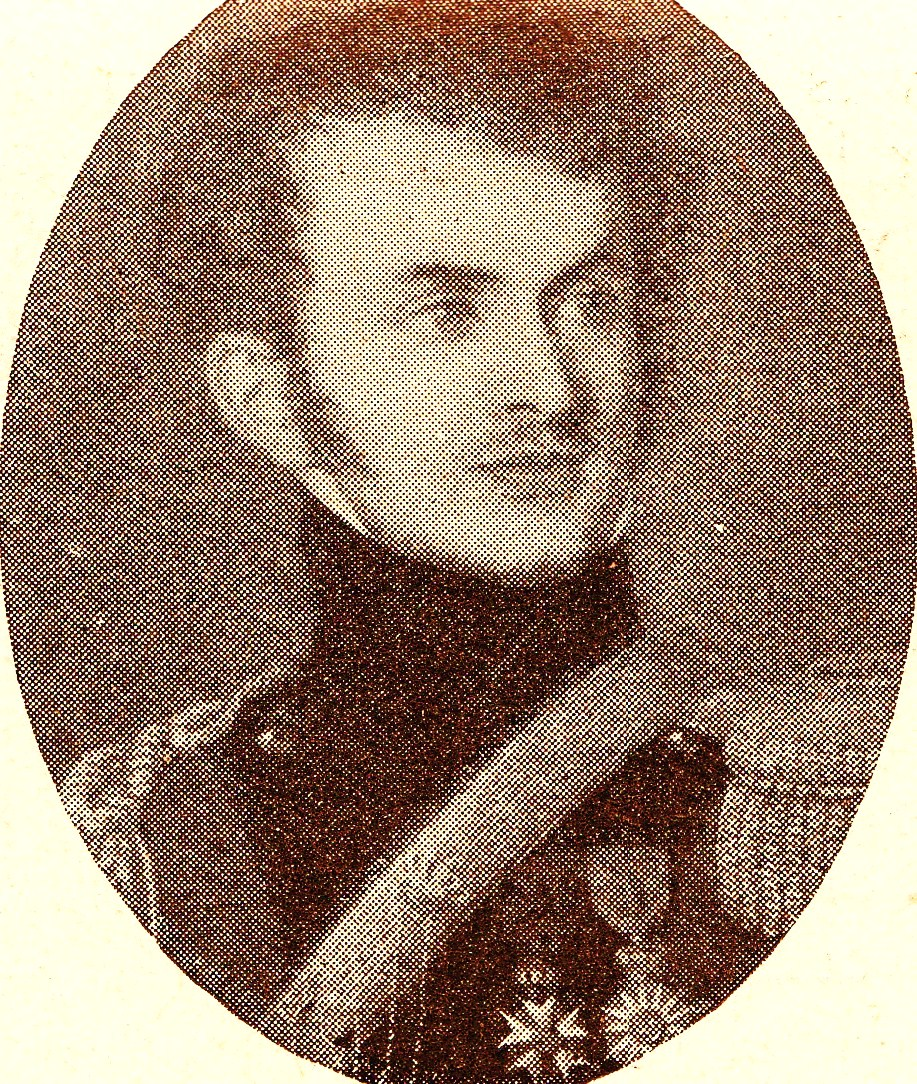
Hubert Joseph Jean Lambert Ridder de Stuers

Hubert Joseph Jean Lambert Ridder de Stuers (November 16, 1788 – April 13, 1861) was a Dutch general and commander of the East Indies Army.

== Life ==
De Stuers was born in Roermond. He joined the French army as a volunteer and in 1817 he left for the Dutch East Indies with the rank of lieutenant-colonel. In 1821 he was appointed commander of the Moluccas. In 1822 he commanded an expedition against Chinese in Borneo, in 1823 he invaded Bone in Sulawesi and from 1824 to 1829 he was military commander and resident of Padang and dependencies. From 1831 to 1838 De Stuers was a General and he commanded the Royal Dutch East Indies Army, after which he lived at Maastricht, where he died on April 13, 1861.

== Works ==
- 1850: De vestiging en uitbreiding der Nederlanders ter westkust van Sumatra. P. N. van Kampen.
- 1853: Aanmerkingen op het werk: Het Ned. O.I. leger ter westkust van Sumatra door den Lt.-kol. Lange (originally published in Tijdschrift voor Nederlandsch-Indië, and then published separately in Zaltbommel)
- 1854: De expeditie tegen Tanette en Soepa (op Celebes) in 1824. Het Tijdschrift voor Ned. Indië.
