= Govert Boyen =

Belgian footballer

Personal information
- Date of birth: 7 March 1977 (age 49)
- Place of birth: Sint-Truiden, Belgium
- Height: 1.84 m (6 ft 1/2 in)
- Position: Goalkeeper

Team information
- Current team: unemployed

Senior career*
Years	Team	Apps	(Gls)
1997–1998	Hasselt	8	(0)
1999–2001	Diest	0	(0)
2001–2002	Zwarte Duivels Oud-Heverlee	30	(0)
2002–2004	Antwerp	5	(0)
2004–2007	Lommel United	97	(0)
2007–2008	OH Leuven	32	(0)
2008	→ Dordrecht (loan)	?	(?)
2009	Verbroedering Geel-Meerhout	8	(0)
2009–2012	Veldwezelt	8	(0)
2013–2014	Herk	2	(0)
- * Club domestic league appearances and goals as of 17 August 2012

Govert Boyen (born 7 March 1977 in Sint-Truiden) is a Belgian retired football goalkeeper. He was last on the books of Veldwezelt where he retired in the summer of 2012. After that he became goalkeeping coach and due to unavailability of the main goalkeeper at Herk FC, he made two more appearances in December 2013 and January 2014. In the 2016-17 season he was again twice on the bench but did not appear for Zepperen-Brustem.

Previously, he played for Antwerp in the Belgian Pro League and spent most of his career with Lommel United and OH Leuven in the Belgian Second Division.
