= Boyens =

Boyens is a surname. Notable people with the surname include:

- Andrew Boyens (born 1983), New Zealand footballer
- Philippa Boyens (born 1962), New Zealand screenwriter and producer
- Phyllis Boyens (1947–2009), American singer and actress

== See also ==
- Boeyens, a surname
- Boyen (disambiguation)
