= Beyens de Grambais =

- noble family
- Country: Netherlands; Belgium

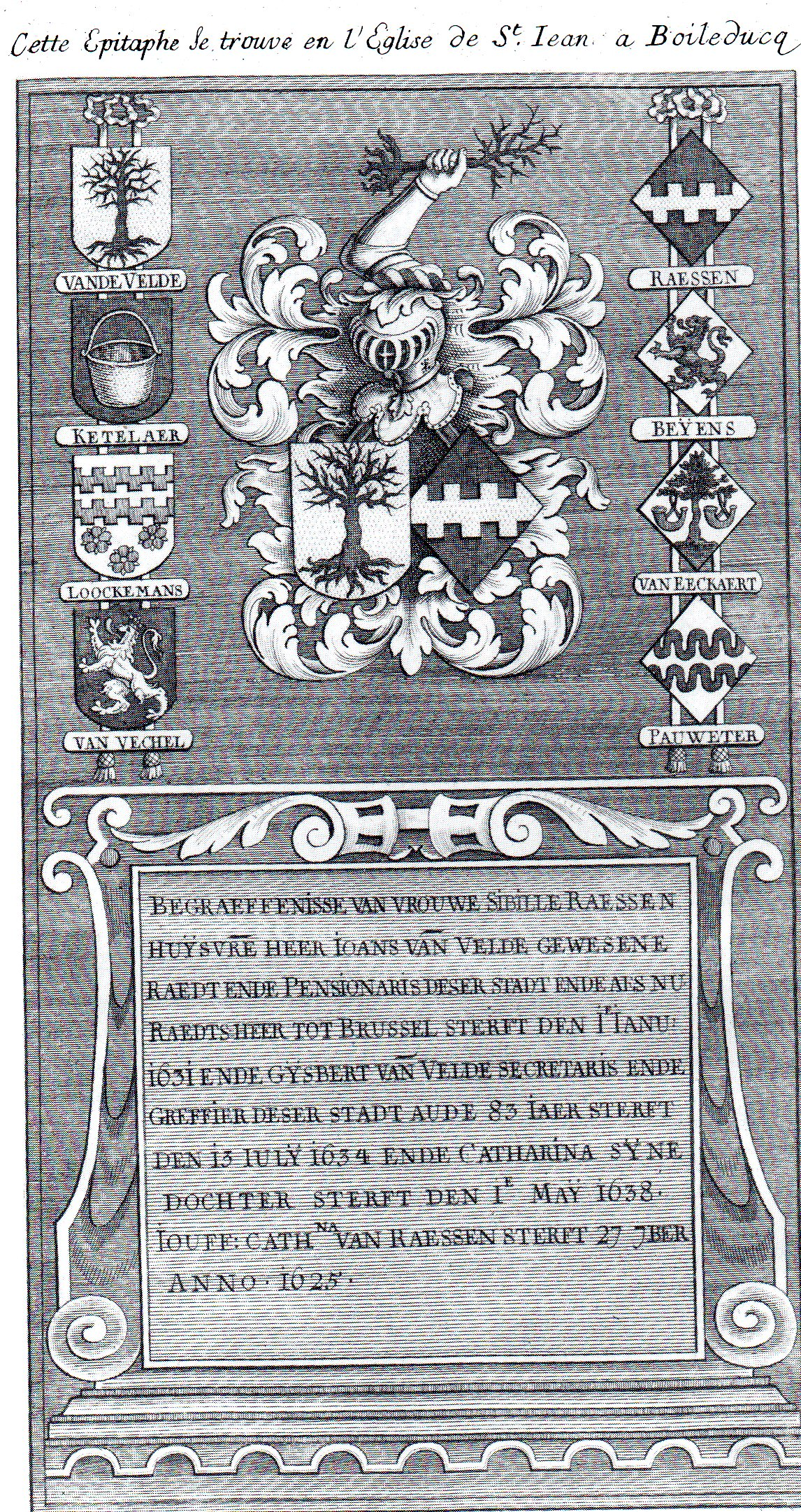
Grave stone of Sibilla Raessen, with the coat of arm of the noble Beyens family.

Beyens de Grambais is a Dutch-Belgian family of nobility, with a branch settling in the Southern Netherlands in the early 17th century.

== A Brabant family ==
The Beyens family originates in the North Brabant in the Netherlands.

- I. Godefroid Beyens, Lord of Drummel and Provost of the brotherhood of the Holy-Virgin in 's-Hertogenbosch. He is included in Nederlandsch geslacht- stam- en wapenboek of Abraham Ferwerda (1785) who writes: "Godefroid Beyens, knight, lived in 1402 and married Maria van Breugel daughter of Jan and Maria Spierinek."

The Family Beyens had then as weapons: Of silver to the Lion of azure, lampassé, lit and armed with gold, with the tail forked and passed in saltire. This ecu is reproduced on the funeral coat of arms of Jean van de Velde, Councillor of 's-Hertogenbosch, deceased in 1644.

- II. Henri Beyens, Lord of Drummel and son of Godefroid, married Catherine van Middegaal.
- III. Gooswyn, married Agnès Lijckmans.
- IV. Dominique Beyens, known as The Pundit, Lord of Drummel, born in 's-Hertogenbosch. He was notary and treasurer of the brotherhood of the Holy-Virgin in 's-Hertogenbosch, like had been his ancestor Godefroid. In August 1566, he brought together a guard of six men, who opposed by the sword the fury of the iconoclasts and protected the valuable possessions of the brotherhood and thus saved them from destruction.
- V. Gooswyn Beyens, Lord of Drummel, born in 1550 and deceased in 1617, married Alida Senmans.
- VI. Pierre Beyens, born in 1584 in 's-Hertogenbosch and deceased in 1638. He was General Collector for the Rhine and the Lower Lip. He was married Elisabeth de Magistris.

== Branch François Beyens, seigneur de Grambais ==
=== François Beyens ===
VII. François Beyens, lord of Grambais, general collector for the Rhine and the Lower Lip and Commissioner for the renewal of horses for His Majesty., ennobled by Philip IV in 1647., son of Pierre Beyens and Elisabeth de Magistris (see VI), born in Amsterdam 13 December 1610, died in 1670., married Anna Cornelia de Maillot, daughter of Jacques Maillot of Bouret, lord of Houvigneul and Artois and of Suzanne del Plano. They had five children:

1) Jacques François Joseph de Beyens, born 13 May 1644, probably deceased in infancy.
2) Marie Suzanne de Beyens, born 21 October 1645.
3) Grégoire Ignace de Beyens, born 19 January 1648. Follows under VIII.
4) Thomas Hyacinthe de Beyens, born 3 January 1649.
5) Michel Pierre de Beyens, born 6 March 1654, bought 24 December 1685 and 7 March 1686, from Marie-Ernestine de Berlo, baronne de Meldert, an important farm in Attenrode

=== Grégoire Beyens ===
- VIII. Grégoire Ignace de Beyens, deceased in 1691, only feudal heir of his father's and mother's 'seigneuries'., meaning that his elder brother died young and without male descendants, lord of Grambais and Houvigneul, married Anne or Marie de Rolly, daughter of Michel de Rolly, lord of Corroy-le-Grand, and of Jacqueline de Happert (Happaert, Happart); he remarried with Maximilienne Philippine Godelive baronne de Ghistelles buried in Oppeule near Brussels 21 December 1721, daughter of Maximilien-Philippe de Ghistelles, lord of Thy, and of Barbe Catherine le Prince.

Children:

1) (first marriage) Michel Joseph de Beyens, follows under IX.
2) (second marriage) Maximilien-Ignace de Beyens.

=== Michel Joseph Beyens ===
IX. Michel Joseph de Beyens, lord of Grambais, Houvigneul etc. married first with Françoise de Godin, daughter of Jacques François de Godin and Marie Waelhem, lady of Terborcht; married secondly with Marie Louise Philippine baronne von Bonninghausen, daughter of Jasper Lothier von Bonninghausen.

Before his marriage Joseph Michel Beyens was a monk under the name of Brother Joseph Beyens in the Abbey of Orival but did cancel his vows by the ecclesiastical court. He had joined in 1693 as a monk the Abbey of Orival. His vows were declared invalid in 1715 by sentence of the ecclesiastical court. Wanting to regain possession of his property, including the lordship of Grambais, he filed a lawsuit in the same year against the Marquis Ambroise Joseph de Herzelle to recover the lordship of Grambais. (Michael) Joseph Beyens, declared that his stepmother Maximilienne Philippine Godelive of Ghistelles forced him to be religious, in order to get a will before his profession and ceded his property in favour of her children. An agreement was reached between the two parties on 7 March 1720. Indeed, Ambroise Joseph de Herzelles agreed to sell the manor of Grambais to Joseph Beyens against repayment of the amount paid by Guillaume-Philippe de Herzelles to acquire this land in 1693.

=== Last generation ===
They had 4 children:

1) Jean de Beyens
2) Marie Benoîte (ou Bénédictine) de Beyens, unmarried: Madame de Beyens dite de Grambais, resided in the beginning of the 19th century in Braine-le-Comte.
3) Jeanne Marie de Beyens
4) Sophie Frédérique de Beyens de Grambais, died 15 March 1785 in Houdeng-Gœgnies (Hainaut), married Antoine François de Biseau, esquire (1735-1785), son of Nicolas François Joseph de Biseau, esquire (1704-1774), lord of Houdeng lès Gognies, Crohen, Bougnies and Saint-Hilaire, and of Marie Ursule d'Antoing de Rochefort (1712-1762).

== Branch Frédéric van Beyens ==
VII bis: Frédéric van Beyens, knight, son of Pierre and Élisabeth de Magistris (see onder VI), born 6 Mai 1618 in Bois-le-Duc, died before 1691, was a councillor in the Brabant Chamber of Accounts, married Catharina van Worcom, Lady of Goedenrath and Vogelsang, daughter of Godefroy van Worcom, esquire, and of Marie de Cocq van Haeften. They had:

1) Marie Elisabeth de Beyens, lady of Goedenrath and Vogelsang, born 26 June 1651, died 3 September 1730, married Jean Adrien baron de Witte van Limminghe, alderman of Aachen 1676-1720, son of Jacob de Witte van Limminghe and Apollonie Alexandrine van Backhausen.
2) Lodewijk van Beyens. Under VIII.
3) Aldegonda van Beyens, unmarried, died in 1724.
4) Ignace van Beyens, captain in the "Guardia Wallona" in Spain, died in 1728, married Therèse van Mieses, daughter of Don Juan.
5) Angelina van Beyens, died in 1738 married Jan Adolph comte von Stupenberg.

VIII. Louis van Beyens, died 24 April 1712, married Jeanne Catherine de Witte van Limminghe. Only one child:

IX. Marie Catharine van Beyens, died in 1712, married Godefroy, baron van Balen, called d'Homborg, without any descent.

== Extinct ==
In the course of the 18th century the last male of the family died.

In the early years of the 19th century, the family became totally extinct at the death of Marie Benoîte de Beyens de Grandbais.

== Other Beyens families (homonymous) ==
- Beyens (Belgian family)
- Beyens (Spanish family)

== Sources ==
- Liste des membres de la Confrérie de la Sainte-Vierge, 's-Hertogenbosch city archives.
- M. de Vegiano, Nobiliaire des Pays-Bas et du Comté de Bourgogne
- Félix Victor Goethals, Archéologie des familles de Belgique, première livraison, Brussels, 1864, pp. 98–101.
- F. Koller, Armorial ancien et moderne de Belgique.
- Paul Janssens and Luc Duerloo, Armorial de la noblesse belge du XVème au XXème siècle.
- Abraham Ferwerda, Nederlandsch geslacht stam en wapen boek.
