= Pommerœul-Condé Canal =

Canal in France and Belgium

Canal de Pommerœul à Condé

Specifications
- Length: 5 km (3.1 mi)
- Locks: 0
- Status: Closed

Geography
- Direction: Northeast/Southwest
- Start point: Nimy-Blaton-Péronnes Canal near Pommerœul
- End point: Scheldt near Condé-sur-l'Escaut
- Ending coordinates: 50.4369°N 3.5901°E

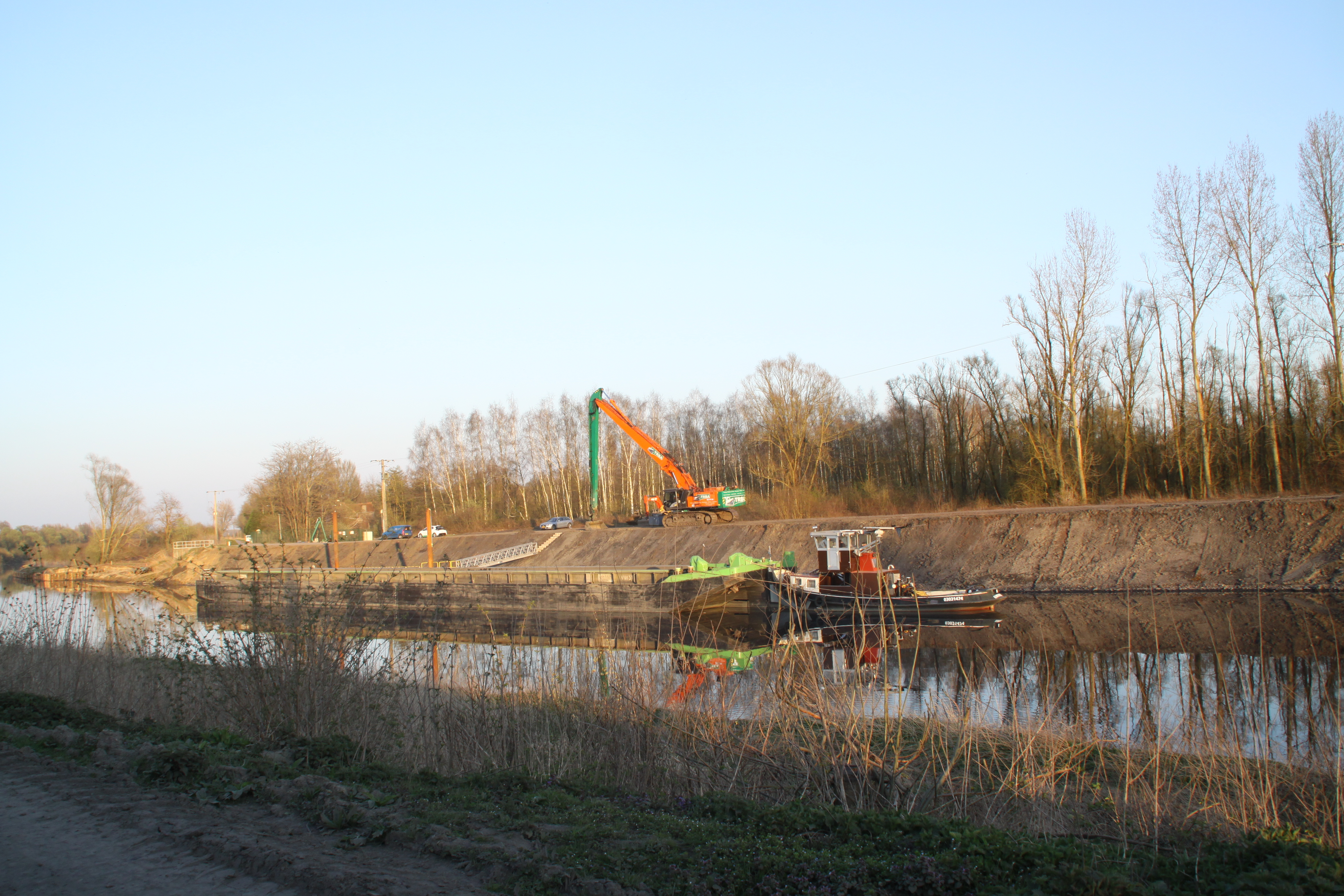
The canal in Condé-sur-l'Escaut

The Canal de Pommerœul à Condé (French pronunciation: [kanal də pɔmʁœl a kɔ̃de]) is a canal in northern France and southwestern Belgium. It connects to Pommerœul in Belgium to Condé-sur-l'Escaut in France. Currently the canal is not in service. It spans 5 km in length and originally had three locks.

== See also ==
- List of canals in France
