= Bernissart =

Municipality in Hainaut Province, Wallonia, Belgium

Bernissart: Bernissåt (Picard)
- Municipality
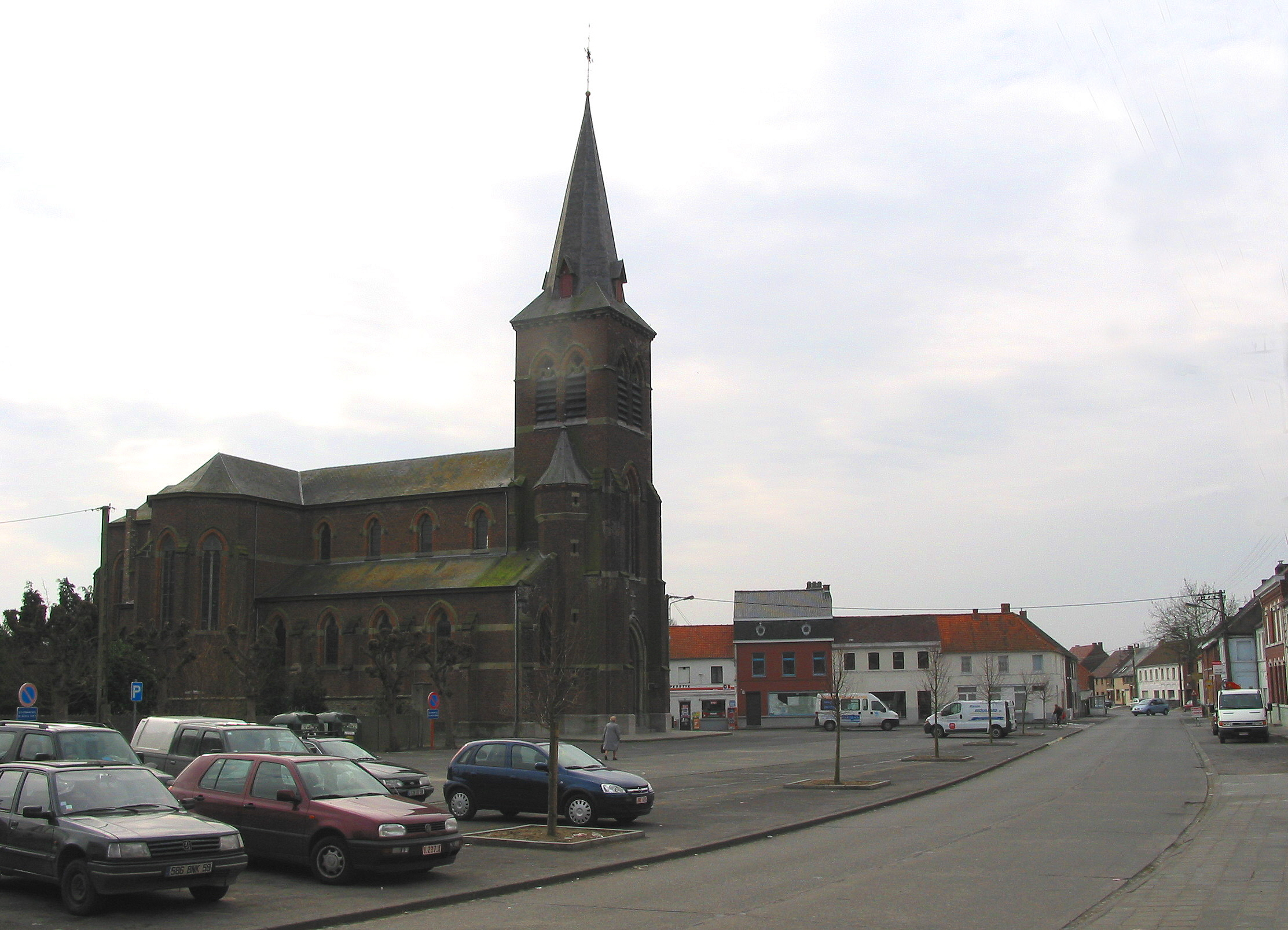
- The neighbourhood of the Holy Virgin church.

- Flag Coat of arms

- Location of Bernissart in Hainaut
- Interactive map of Bernissart
- Location in Belgium
- Coordinates: 50°29′N 03°39′E
- Country: Belgium
- Community: French Community
- Region: Wallonia
- Province: Hainaut
- Arrondissement: Ath

Government
  - Mayor: Roger Vanderstraeten (PS)
  - Governing party: PS - MR

Area
  - Total: 43.81 km^{2} (16.92 sq mi)

Population (2025-01-01)
  - Total: 11,894
  - Density: 271.5/km^{2} (703.2/sq mi)
- Postal codes: 7320-7322
- NIS code: 51009
- Area codes: 069
- Website: www.bernissart.be

Bernissart (French pronunciation: [bɛʁnisaʁ]; Picard: Bernissåt) is a municipality of Wallonia located in the province of Hainaut, Belgium.

On January 1, 2024, Bernissart had a total population of 11,878. The total area is 43.81 km^{2}, which gives a population density of 271 inhabitants per km^{2}.

The municipality consists of the following districts: Blaton, Bernissart, Harchies, Pommerœul, and Ville-Pommerœul.

== Geography ==
=== Location ===
A popular tourist municipality renowned for its numerous natural sites, Bernissart has an altitude ranging from 15 meters in the Harchies Marshes (a notable natural area) to 81 meters in the Stambruges Forest.

Located in a border area, it shares its western boundary with Condé-sur-l'Escaut, France. A part of Bernissart even extends onto French territory, forming a hamlet attached to this French municipality.

Bernissart is crossed by three main historical canals: Blaton-Ath in the north, Nimy-Blaton-Péronnes, and Pommerœul-Antoing in the center, which converge at an intersection in Blaton, earning it the nickname "Little Venice of Hainaut". It is also traversed by the Pommerœul-Condé canal and, to the southeast near the E19 highway, by the Haine River.

The municipality is well-served by the N50 road, the E42 and E19 highways, as well as railway line 78, which serves the three stations within its territory.

Thanks to this strategic location, Bernissart is just 22 km from Mons and 24 km from Tournai, at the crossroads of major road, rail, and waterway networks.

Cartographic representation of the municipality

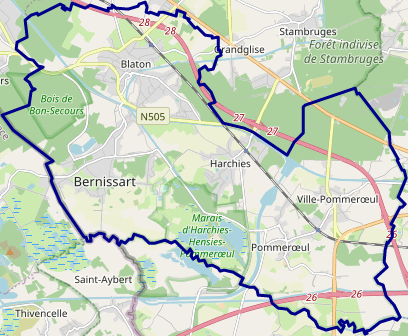
OpenStreetMap map

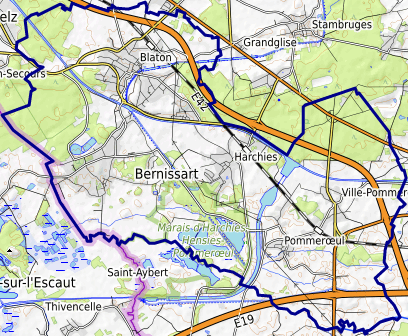
Topographic map

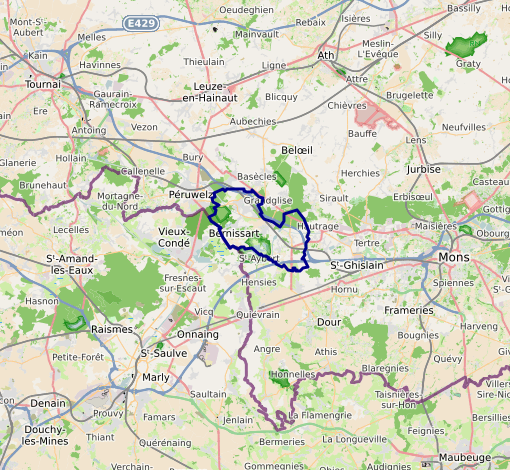
Smaller-scale map

=== Sections of the municipality ===
#	Name	Area (km²)	Population (2020)	Population per km²	NIS Code
1	Bernissart	11.83	3,329	281	51009A0
2	Harchies	5.10	1,771	347	51009A1
3	Pommerœul	15.69	1,796	114	51009B0
4	Ville-Pommerœul	0.71	721	1,019	51009B1
5	Blaton	10.49	4,234	404	51009C

== The Iguanodon mine ==
In 1878, dozens of Iguanodon skeletons were discovered in a coal mine, at a depth of 322 m (1,056 ft). At the time, their proximity was considered proof that some dinosaurs were herd animals. They were mounted by Louis Dollo and set the standard that was followed for over a century. Nine of the twenty-nine skeletons are currently on display at the Royal Belgian Institute of Natural Sciences, and one at the Bernissart Museum. The two museums even made an error they acknowledge with humour: they displayed the skeletons "standing", suggesting that the dinosaurs were bipedal, which is not the case. Found alongside the Iguanodon skeletons were the remains of plants, fish, and other reptiles, including the crocodyliform Bernissartia. The sediments are considered to belong to the Sainte-Barbe Clays Formation.

== Economy ==
The industrial zoning of Bernissart is located in the territory of Harchies, bordering the Nimy-Blaton-Péronnes Canal and situated near the E42 highway and railway line 78. It hosts a wide variety of SMEs ( Small and Medium Enterprises ) operating in sectors such as waste management, construction, mechanics, public works, industry, and transportation. This zoning also includes the municipality's container park.

A project launched in 2023 by IDETA aimed to expand the zoning by clearing part of the Imbrechies Forest. However, due to public discontent and the opposition of Walloon Minister Willy Borsus, the project was abandoned in favor of more environmentally friendly alternatives, which are still under discussion.

== Politics and Administration ==
=== List of Mayors ===
- Robert Van Ceunebroecke, from 1960 to 1991, (PS).
- Freddy Wattiez, from 1991 to 2006, (PS).
- Roger Vanderstraeten, from 2007 to present, (PS).

=== Twin town ===
- Feignies, France

== Demographics ==
=== Demographics: Before the municipality merger ===
- Source: DGS population census
- 1970* : Annexation of Harchies

=== Demographics: Merged municipality ===
Taking into account the former municipalities involved in the 1977 merger, the following demographic evolution can be drawn:

_{The figures from 1831 to 1970 include those from the merged municipalities.}

- Source: DGS, from 1831 to 1981 = population censuses; from 1990 = number of inhabitants each 1 January

== Notable residents ==
- Victor Martin, a Belgian Resistance member and academic sociologist who was sent to report on allegations of mass-murder of Jews in Poland for the resistance in 1943.
- Luce Irigaray, a feminist philosopher and linguist who was born in Blaton in 1930.
- Ernest de Merode, holder of the title of Baron of Harchies. (1595-1677).

== Gallery ==
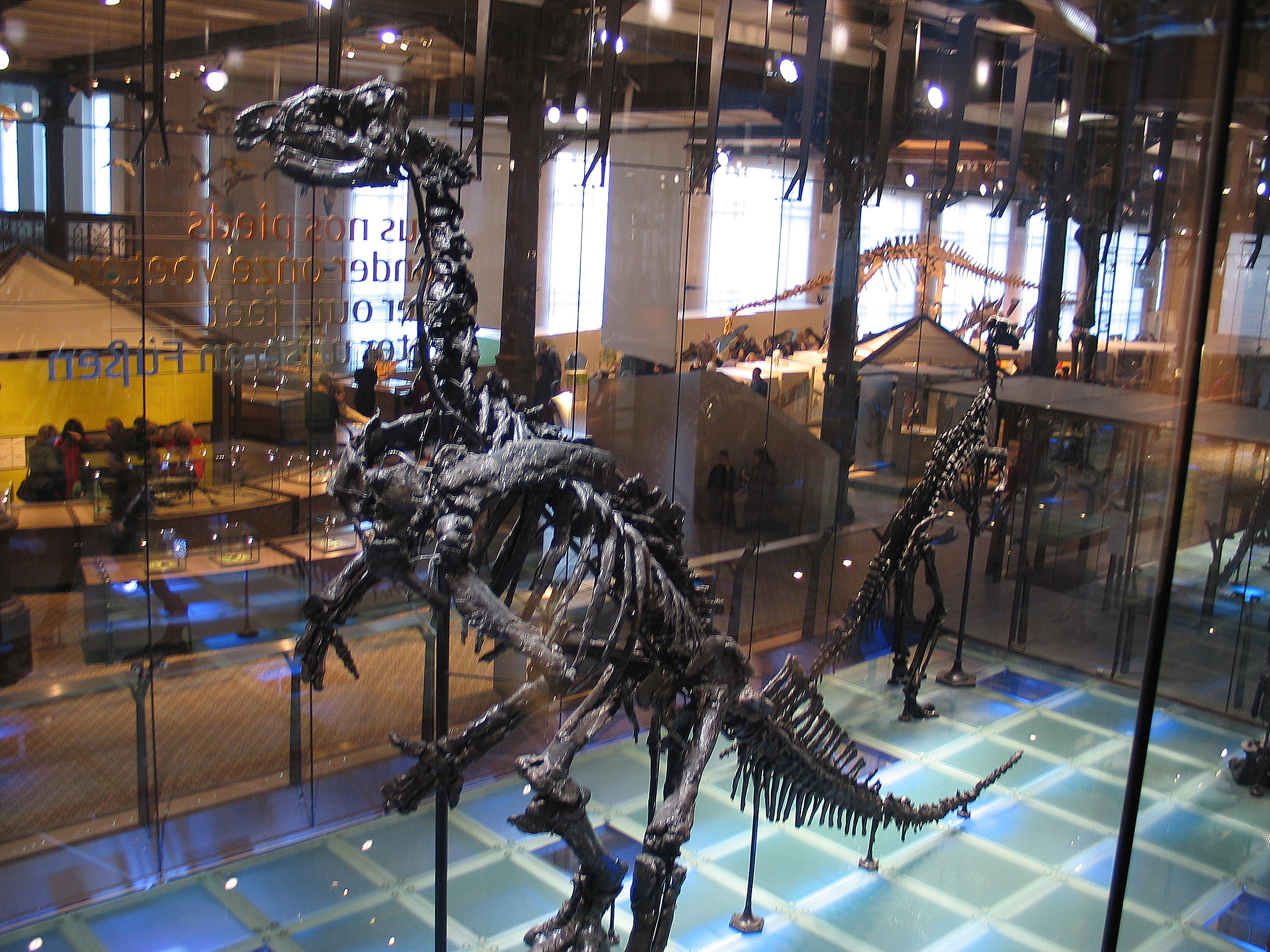
One of the Bernissart Iguanodons on display at the Royal Belgian Institute of Natural Sciences.

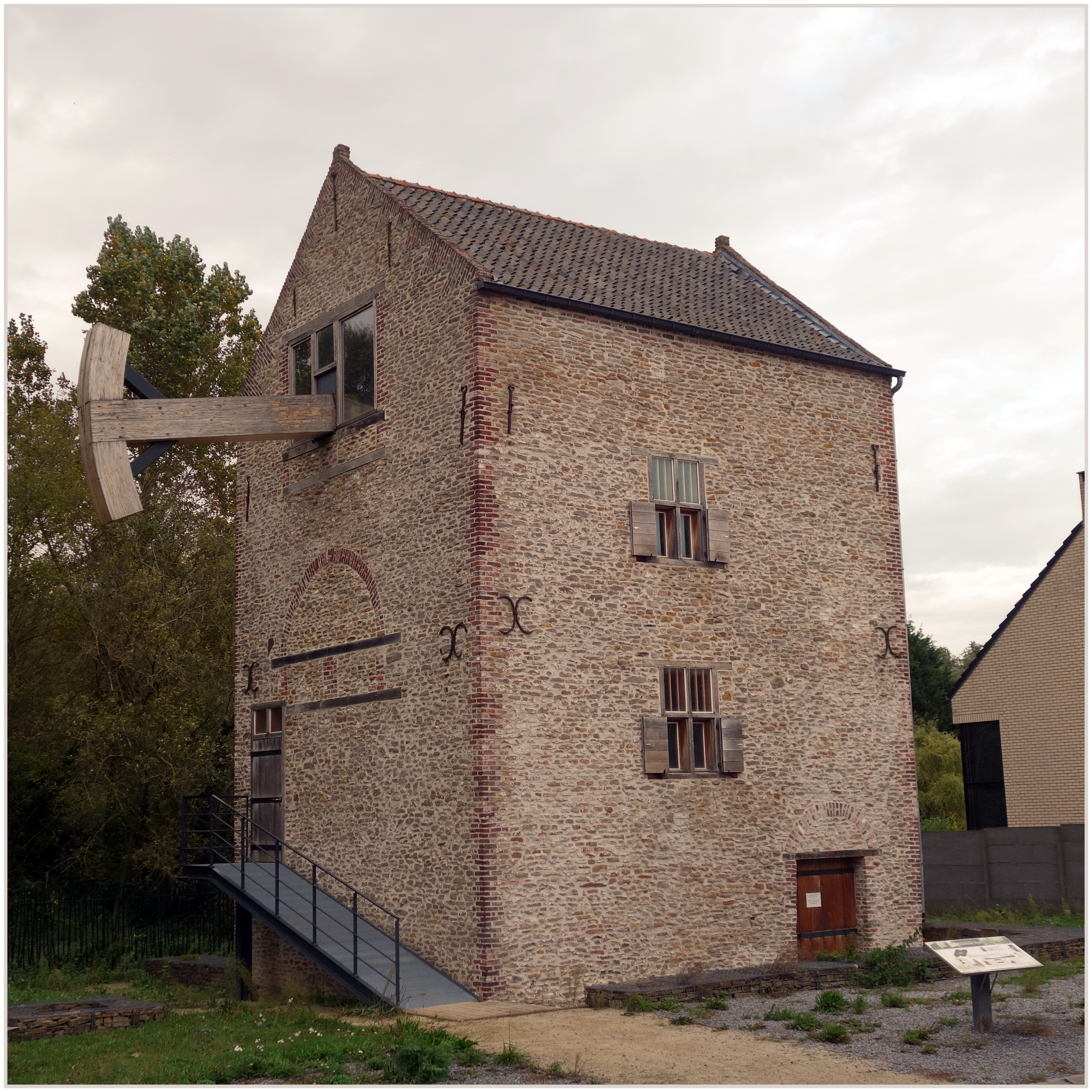
Ancient Thomas Newcomen engine building (1781) in Bernissart.

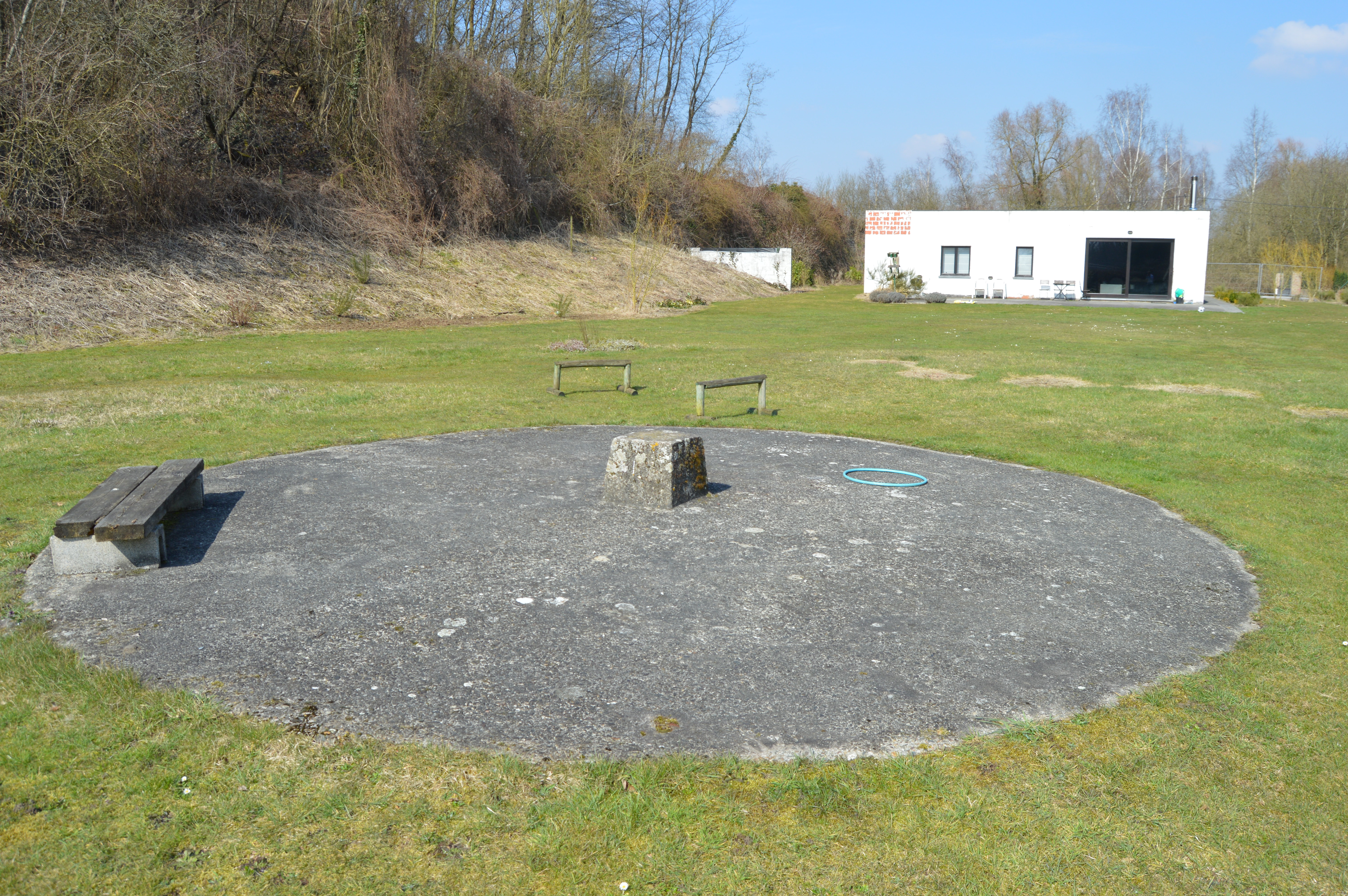
Ancient Sainte-Barbe pit 3 of the coal mine in Bernissart, Belgium, where were found the remains of a herd of iguanodons in 1878.

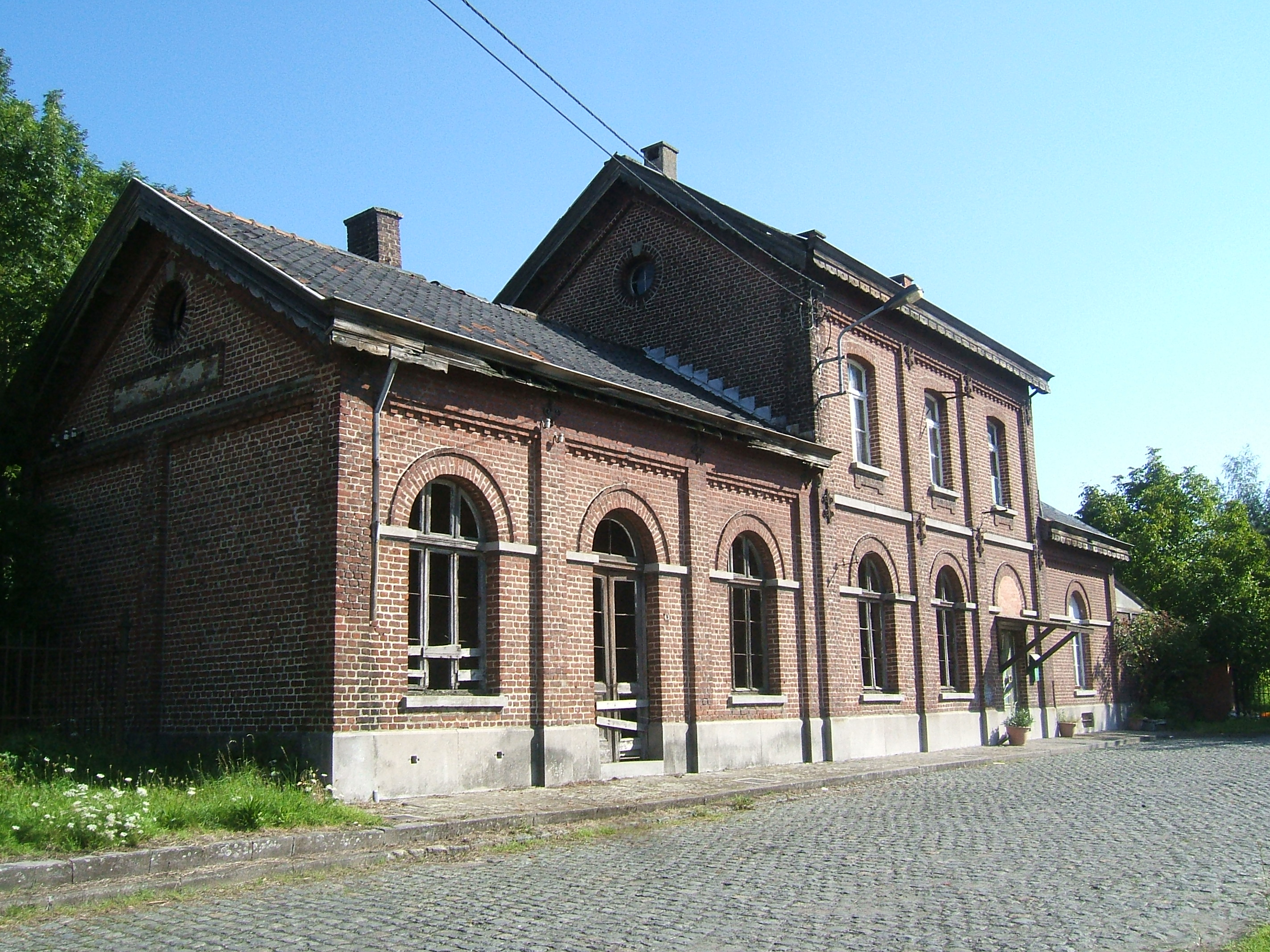
Bernissart old station.
