= Beyens (Spanish family) =

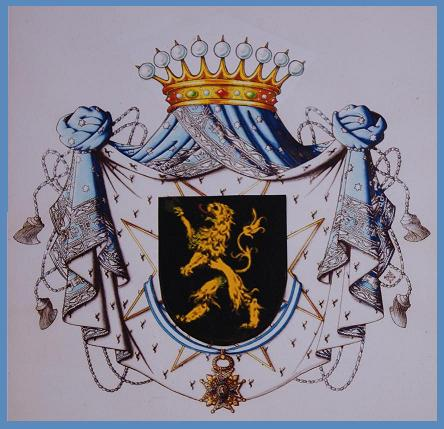
Armorial bearings of Don Lorenzo Beyens y Huwin, Count of Villamar, Viscount of San Lorenzo and Knight of the Order of Charles III

The brothers Josse Beyens and Cornelio Beyens, born respectively in 1666 and 1672 in a merchant family of Merxem near Antwerp, left to establish themselves in Cádiz in Spain at the end of the 17th century. They were the sons of Josse Beyens.

== The origins ==
The family Beyens had many connexions with the parish church of St Bartholomew in Merksem. In its archives are to be found some members of the family Beyens. In the 17th century appears Lucia Beyens, married to Thomas Bogaerts. They wrote their wills on 5 May 1653. There was also Joannes Beyens, who was sacristan and schoolmaster between 1673 and 1695. Also Joos Beyens, who between 1681 and 1703 exercised the craft of cartwright.

Josef Beyens was baptized on 17 April 1639 in the parish church of Merksem. He was the son of Juan Beyens and Petronela van Beren. On 19 July 1662 he married Anna Torrekens in Wijnegem and they had three children: Anna, José en Cornelio Beyens. Josef Beyens died on 8 February 1698 in Merksem.

== Great merchants in Cádiz ==
Cornelio Beyens was born in Merksem in 1672 and died in Cádiz in 1736 or 1737. In 1693 he left Flanders and lived for two years in Madrid. He had previously been in contact with the merchant family Huwijn in Bruges, of whom one was established in Cádiz. In 1695 he moved to Cádiz. On 3 May 1699 he married María Bruggemans in Cádiz.

Cornelio Beyens and also his elder brother Josse, were established as merchants in Cádiz and became rapidly amongst the most prosperous families of this town. Cornelio was Consul of the Flemish Nation in Cádiz.

== Entry into nobility ==
His sons Lorenzo, Rafael and Alejandro Beyens saw their nobility "recognized" by the Royal Chancellery of Grenade on 8 August 1766, based on the presentation of a false genealogy approved by the heraldry services in Brussels, making them the descendants of the noble family Beyens de Grambais. (Note: Several members of the Beyens de Grambais family had exercised noble professions and this was usurped by the descendants of the modest Beyens of Merxem. The kings of arms in Brussels were notoriously open to receiving bribes for confirmation of falsified genealogies. The genealogist and hoaxer Charles Poplimont also made from them the descendants of the noble family Beyens de Grambais. But sons of a noble family of militaries and high civil servants could not become simple merchants. The archives of Merxem give the more humble origins of this family.)

On 3 December 1773, Charles III of Spain granted Lorenzo the hereditary titles of Count of Villamar and Viscount of San Lorenzo. Five years later, Lorenzo Beyens reached an important political situation by becoming Sindico Personero, that is to say "representative of the people" of the town of Cádiz and on 14 July 1779, he was admitted in the Order of Charles III. Being given the social status which they had reached, the Beyens had to give up their lucrative commercial activities. Lorenzo Josef and Josef Maria, sons of Lorenzo Beyens, thus became officers in the Walloon Guards, a popular regiment among Flemish émigrés established in Spain. This branch of the Beyens family remained in Cádiz and gave soldiers and engineers until the 20th century.
