= Casimir Ubaghs =

Dutch theologian

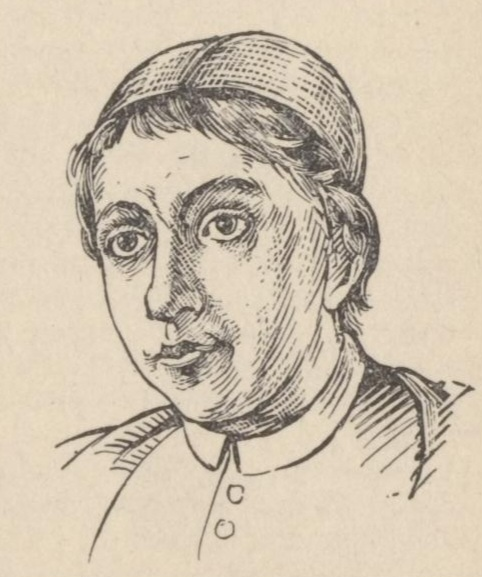
Gerhard Casimir Ubaghs

Gérard Casimir Ubaghs (or Gerhard Casimir Ubaghs) (26 November 1800 – 15 February 1875) was a Dutch Catholic philosopher and theologian. For about 30 years (1834–1864) he was the chief formulator and promoter of a type of philosophical theology known as "traditionalist ontologism." Many of Ubaghs' doctrines were modifications of forms of traditionalism and ontologism that were already current in the 19th- and previous centuries. Ubaghs and some of his followers taught primarily at the Catholic University of Louvain, where a school of philosophical theology based on his teachings came into being. This school of philosophical theology is referred to, variously, as the Traditionalist Ontologism of Louvain, or as the Ontologico-Traditionalist School of Louvain.

== Family background ==
Ubaghs was born in Berg en Terblijt, a village in the municipality of Valkenburg aan de Geul, in Limburg (Netherlands). His parents were Jean Ubachs (1758 – 30 April 1833), who was an innkeeper on the Cauberg, and Marie Helene Pluijmen (1763 – 6 November 1840). Gerard's father spelled his surname "Ubachs" instead of "Ubaghs", as did many other members of his family. Jean and Marie were married on 16 November 1783 in Valkenburg; they had 10 children: Gérard had 4 brothers and 5 sisters.

== Career ==
In 1834, while professor of philosophy at the seminary of Rolduc, Ubaghs was called to the Catholic University of Louvain. During the period 1834–1864, the Catholic University of Louvain was famous for being the primary dissemination point of traditionalist ontologism. Ubaghs held the position of Ordinary Professor and Dean of the Faculty of Philosophy and Letters, teaching a general introduction to philosophy, as well as logic, metaphysics and psychological anthropology.

In 1846, Ubaghs undertook the editorship of the Revue catholique (founded in 1843), which had become the official organ of ontologism. He was joined in this endeavor by Arnold-Pieter Tits (1807–1851) and Gérard Lonay (1806–1883). Tits had taught beside Ubaghs in the Seminary of Rolduc, and then transferred to Louvain in 1840, where he became professor of fundamental theology. Lonay had also been a professor at Rolduc before transferring to Louvain.

Additional followers of Ubaghs included Nicholas-Joseph Laforêt (1823–1872), Pieter Claessens (1817–1886) (Canon of St. Rumbold's Cathedral in Mechlin), Jacques-Nicolas Moeller (1777–1862), Abbé Thomas-Joseph Bouquillon (1840–1902), and Bernard Van Loo, OFMRec (1818–1885).

Ubaghs had several followers in France, the most prominent of whom were Louis Branchereau SS (1819–1913), Philippe Jerôme Marie Jules Fabre d'Envieu (1821–1901), and Flavien-Abel-Antoine Hugonin (1823–1898) (Bishop of Bayeux and Lisieux).

But opponents of Ubaghs soon appeared. The Journal historique et littéraire founded by Pierre Kersten (1789–1865), kept up an incessant controversy with the Revue catholique. Opponents of Ubaghs' traditionalist ontologism who joined Kersten included Bonaventure Joseph Gilson (1796–1884) (dean of Bouillon), Jean-Joseph Lupus (1810–1888), and others. From 1858 to 1861 the controversy raged. It was at its height when a decision of the Roman Congregation (21 September 1864) censured in Ubaghs's works a series of propositions relating to ontologism. Already in 1843 the Congregation of the Index had taken note of five propositions and ordered Ubaghs to correct them and expunge them from his teaching, but he misunderstood the import of this first decision. When his career was ended in 1864 he had the mortification of witnessing the ruin of a teaching to which he had devoted forty years of his life.

From 1864 until his death in Louvain in 1875, Ubaghs lived in retirement.

== Philosophy ==
Ubaghs was a Traditionalist, holding that moral knowledge could only be acquired through oral transmission of divine revelation, not through human reason. On this theory, the primordial act of man is an act of faith, with the authority of others as the basis of certitude. Unlike some Traditionalists, however, Ubaghs did not hold this to imply that all moral knowledge was founded on blind trust, or that the existence of God could not be rationally proved. Instead, he believed that, while human reason could not discover moral truths unaided, it could comprehend and demonstrate them once they were awakened by instruction. Ubaghs writes:

As the word "view" chiefly expresses four things, the faculty of seeing, the act of seeing, the object seen, e.g. a landscape, and the drawing an artist makes of this object, so we give the name idea, which is derived from the former, chiefly to four different things: the faculty of knowing rationally, the act of rational knowledge, the object of this knowledge, the intellectual copy or formula which we make of this object in conceiving it.

== Works ==
- Logicae seu philosophiae rationalis elementa (6 editions, 1834–60)
- Ontologiae sive metaph. generalis specimen (5 editions, 1835–63)
- Theodicae seu theologiae naturalis (4 editions)
- Anthropoligicae philosoph. elementa (1848)
- Précis de logique élémentaire (5 editions)
- Précis d'anthropol. psychologique (5 editions)
- Du réalisme en théologie et en philosophie (1856)
- Essai d'idéologie ontologique (1860)

Ubaghs also wrote numerous articles in the Louvain Revue catholique.
