= Bonald =

Bonald or Bonalde may refer to:

- Honoré de Bonald (1894–?), aviator
- Juan Antonio Pérez Bonalde (1846–1892), poet
- Louis Gabriel Ambroise de Bonald (1754–1840), French philosopher and politician
  - Victor de Bonald (1780–1871), son
  - Louis Jacques Maurice de Bonald (1787–1870), son

== See also ==
- Bonalds Island, Canada
