= Prosper de Haulleville =

Belgian journalist and author

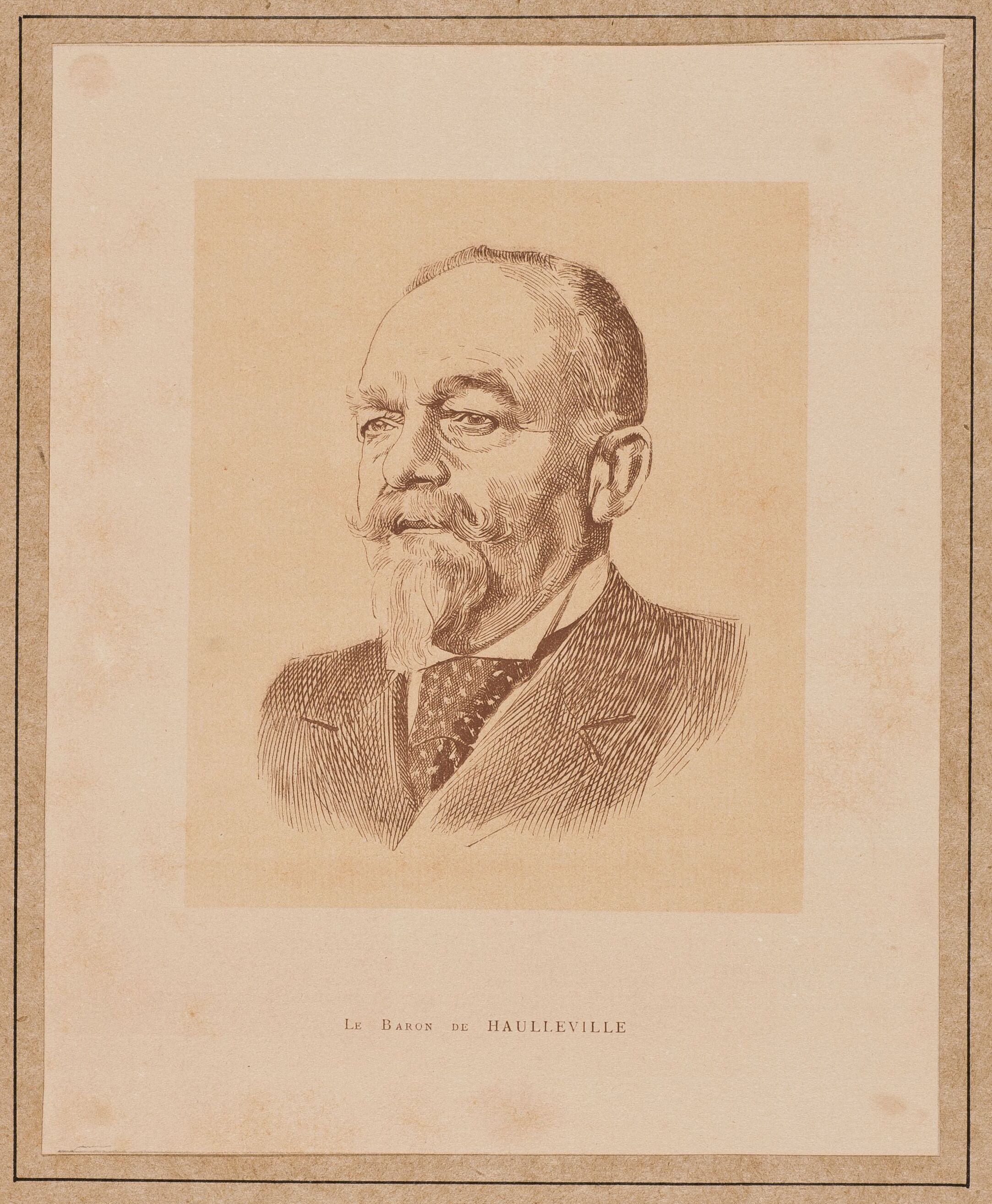
- Born: 28 May 1830; Luxembourg, United Kingdom of the Netherlands
- Died: 25 April 1898 (aged 67); Brussels, Kingdom of Belgium
- Education: Athénée royal d'Arlon, Athénée royal de Liège
- Alma mater: Université libre de Bruxelles
- Occupations: editor of Revue Générale (1874–1890), Journal de Bruxelles (1878–1890)
- Writing career
- Pen name: Félix de Breux
- Language: French
- Period: 1850-1898
- Subject: current affairs
- Notable work: De l'avenir des Peuples catholiques (1876)

Prosper de Haulleville (1830–1898), who also wrote under the pen name Félix de Breux, was a Belgian journalist and author who was influential on his country's adoption of universal manhood suffrage with plural voting and proportional representation.

== Life ==
Haulleville was born in Luxembourg on 28 May 1830 and was orphaned at an early age. He was raised by uncles, and educated at state secondary schools in Virton, Arlon and Liège. Raised a non-believer, at the age of 16 he heard a sermon by Lacordaire that entirely changed his outlook.

After obtaining a doctorate in law from the Université libre de Bruxelles, he studied History and Philosophy at the University of Bonn. In 1857, he was appointed to a professorship in law at the State University of Ghent, but he was removed from this position a year later by order of Prime Minister Charles Rogier due to his outspoken views on the rights of Catholics. His academic career at an end, he dedicated the rest of his life to journalism and independent study. In 1860 he took over the failing newspaper L'Universel but was unable to turn it around. It folded in 1861.

Haulleville was among the organisers of the first of the Malines Congresses, in 1863. The following year he established a publishing house that acquired Pierre Kersten's Journal historique et littéraire and launched the Revue Générale (1865), of which he became editor from 1874 to 1890. At the same time, he was editor of the Journal de Bruxelles from 1878 to 1890.

His editorial line at both the Revue Générale and the Journal de Bruxelles campaigned against Liberal encroachments on the rights of Catholics under the ministry of Walthère Frère-Orban (1878-1884), but also adopted progressive stances aligned with the emergence of Christian democracy that were at odds with the conservatism of the Catholic Party that came to power in 1884. He also published contemporary writers associated with La Jeune Belgique.

After more or less being forced out as editor in 1890, Haulleville was in 1891 appointed chief curator of the Royal Museums of Decorative and Industrial Arts and Halle Gate. In the early 1890s he repeatedly tried to get Tramways Bruxellois to extend a line to the new museum site in the Cinquantenaire Park, but was unable to provide the matching funds they required. Since 1888 he had also been lecturing on history and constitutional law at the Royal Military Academy. He continued publishing political controversy, but under the pen name Félix de Breux, in the Journal de Bruxelles, Durendal, L'Avenir social and La Justice sociale.

Haulleville had stood for parliament on four occasions but was never elected. In 1895, he was elected to the Brussels City Council on the National Independents list. He died in Brussels on 25 April 1898.

== Writings ==
Protestant and Catholic Civilization Compared: The Future of Catholic Peoples (1878)

- Histoire des Communes Lombardes (2 vols., 1857-1858)
- Les Catholiques et les libertés constitutionnelles en Belgique (1863)
- Les Institutions representatives en Autriche (1863)
- L'Allemagne depuis la Guerre de Sept Ans (1868)
- De l'enseignement primaire en Belgique (1870)
- La Nationalité belge; ou Flamands et Wallons (1870)
- De l'avenir des Peuples catholiques (1876)
  - German translation as Die Zukunft der katholischen Völker (1876)
  - English translation as Protestant and Catholic Civilization Compared: The Future of Catholic Peoples (1878)
- Les nonciatures apostoliques en Belgique depuis 1830 (1890)
- Projet de loi organisant la représentation des intérêts au Sénat (1891)
- Portraits et silhouettes (2 vols., 1892-1893)
- Étude sur le Sénat (1897)
