= Thomas Braun =

Belgian lawyer and French-language poet

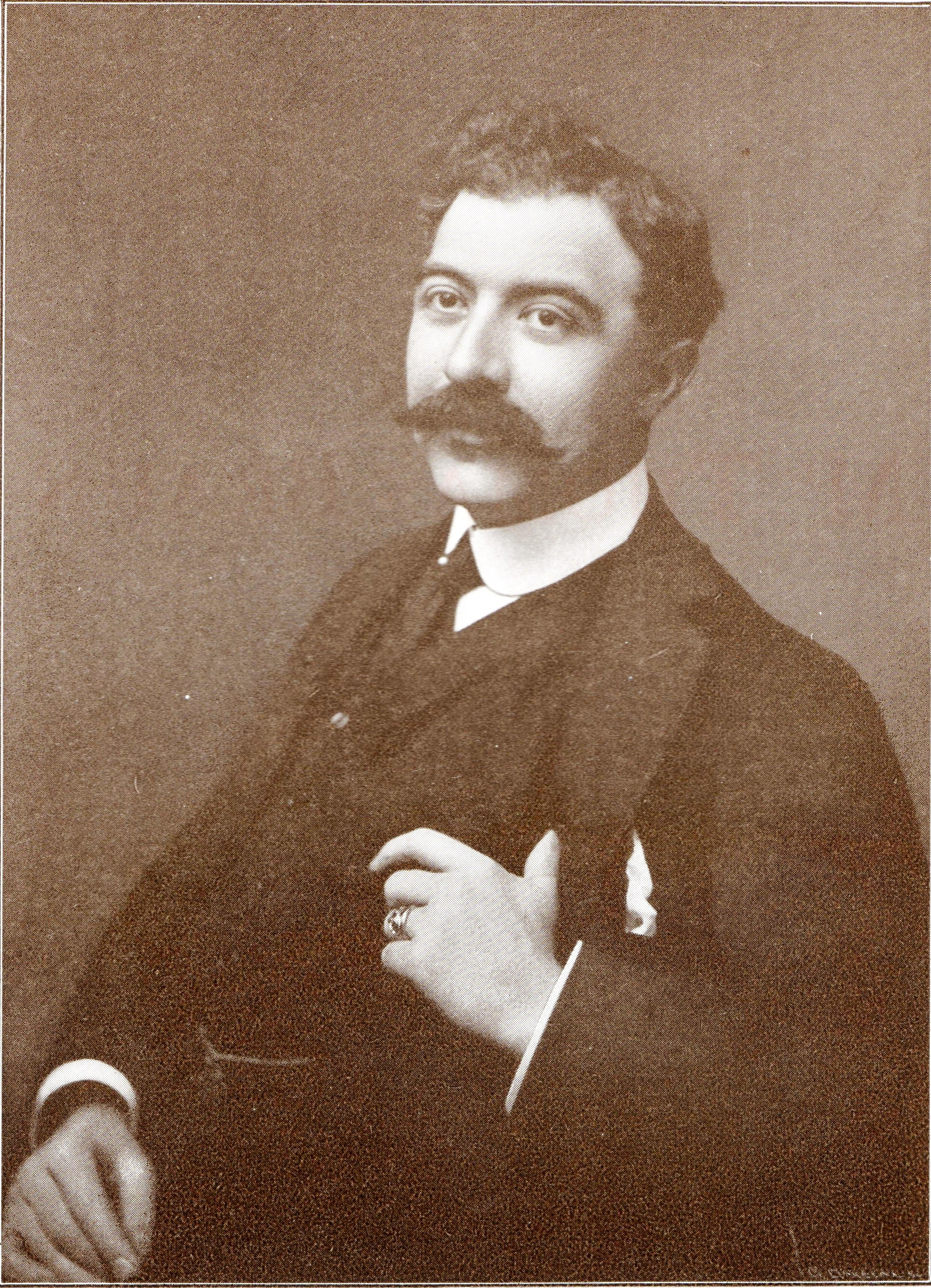
- Thomas Braun celebrating 25 years at the bar (1923)
- Born: Thomas Marie Joseph Braun; 8 September 1876; Brussels, Belgium
- Died: 11 September 1961 (aged 85); Ixelles (Brussels), Belgium
- Education: Institut Saint-Louis; Catholic University of Louvain
- Occupation: Lawyer
- Spouses: Marguerite Van Mons, Hélène Moeller
- Writing career
- Pen name: TOM, Thomas Bonissart, Brunissart, Ranhissart
- Language: French
- Period: Fin de siècle
- Genre: poetry
- Subjects: nature, family, the Ardennes
- Notable work: Fumée d'Ardenne (1912)
- Notable awards: Elected to the Académie royale de langue et de littérature françaises de Belgique

Thomas Braun (1876–1961) was a Belgian lawyer and French-language poet. He also published under the pen names Bonissart, Brunissart, and Ranhissart.

== Life ==
Braun was born in Brussels on 8 September 1876, the son of Senator Alexandre Braun and Fanny Marcq. He was educated at the Institut Saint-Louis in Brussels, spending his vacations in the Ardennes at Bagimont (now a subdivision of Vresse-sur-Semois). He took the candidature in law at the Faculté Saint-Louis in Brussels, spent some time in Bonn, and completed his studies at the Catholic University of Louvain.

Even before graduating, he was publishing verse and prose under a variety of pen names in a wide range of periodicals, including L'Avenir du Luxembourg, L'Avenir social, La Justice sociale, Le Luxembourg, La Belgique, the Journal de Bruxelles, L'Etudiant, La Famille, La Petite revue belge, Chasse et pêche, and La Revue vélocipédique belge. In 1895, he went to Paris to meet Joris-Karl Huysmans.

He was a founding member of L'Escholier and the Société Générale Bruxelloise des Etudiants Catholiques ("Gé"), and a regular contributor to new reviews such as Le Drapeau, Durendal, and Le Spectateur catholique. From 1898 onwards, he was very active in the legal profession. He co-authored two legal works, one on trademarks and one on patents. In 1900, he married Marguerite Van Mons. They lived in Brussels, with a summer home in the Ardennes at Maissin (now a subdivision of Paliseul). During the First World War he was an active defence lawyer for Belgians brought before the tribunals established by the forces of occupation. After his first wife's death in 1919, he married Hélène Moeller (Henry Moeller's niece and editorial assistant at Durendal). He was elected to the Académie royale de langue et de littérature françaises de Belgique in 1939, but was installed only in 1946. He was among the founders of the Académie Luxembourgeoise.

He died in Ixelles (Brussels) on 11 September 1961.

== Writings ==
Poetry

- L'An (1897)
- Le Livre des bénédictions (1900)
- Philatélie (1910)
- Fumée d'Ardenne (1912)
- Les Bénédictions (1941)
- Le Zodiaque (1949)

Law

- with Albert Capitaine, Les marques de fabrique et de commerce (Brussels, 1908)
- with Paul Struye, Précis des brevets d'invention et de la contrefaçon matérielle (Brussels, 1935).
