= Henry Carton de Wiart =

Belgian writer and statesman

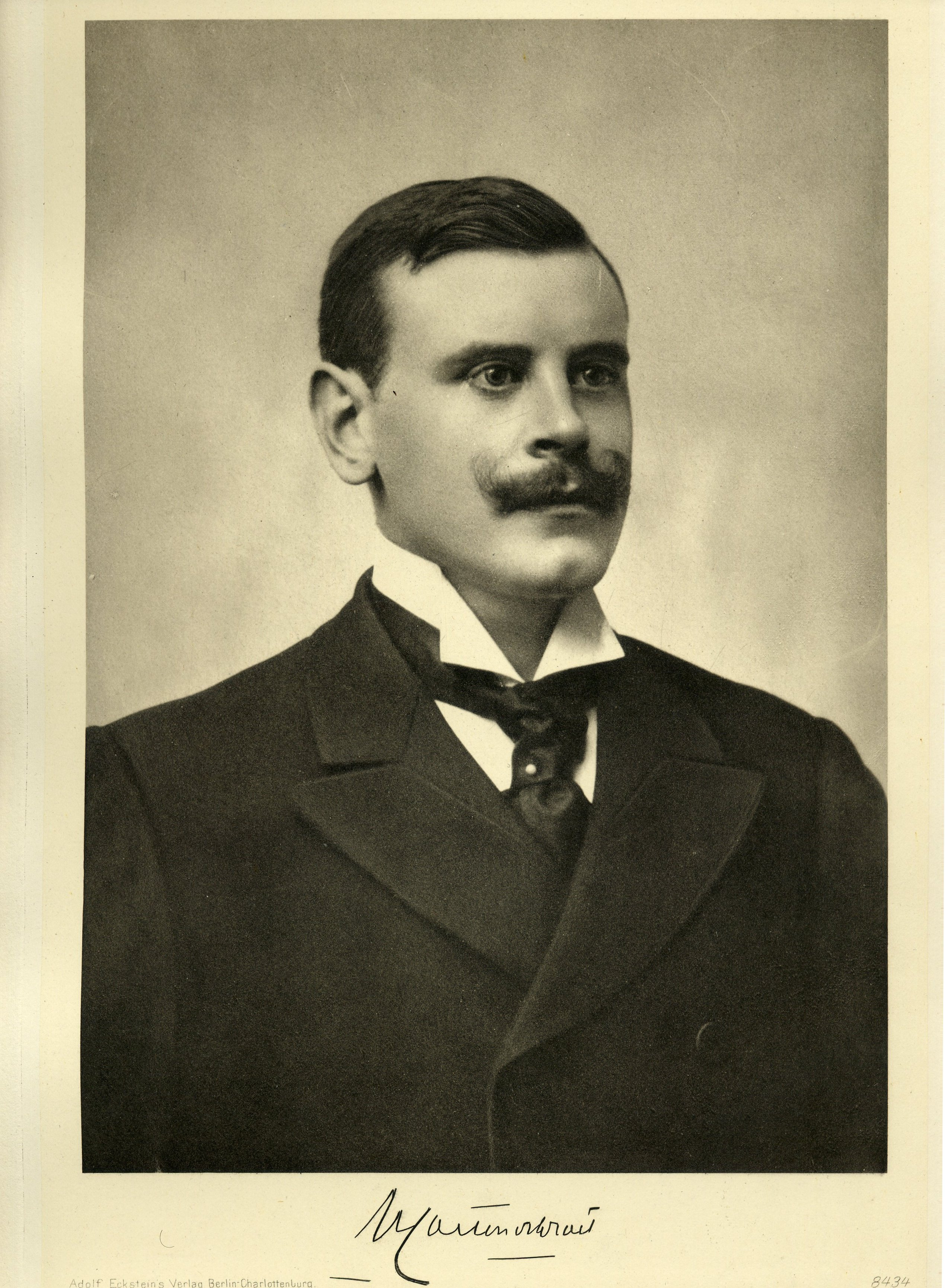

Prime Minister of Belgium
- In office 20 November 1920 – 16 December 1921
- Monarch: Albert I
- Preceded by: Léon Delacroix
- Succeeded by: Georges Theunis

Personal details
- Born: Henry Victor Marie Ghislain Carton de Wiart; 31 January 1869 Brussels, Belgium
- Died: 6 May 1951 (aged 82) Uccle, Belgium
- Party: Catholic Party
- Spouse: Juliette Verhaegen
- Parents: Diégo Benjamin Constant Carton de Wiart (father); Marie Clémence Jeanne Cammaerts (mother)
- Relatives: Adrian Carton de Wiart (cousin)
- Education: St Joseph College, Aalst; St Michael College, Brussels
- Alma mater: Institut Saint-Louis, Brussels; Université libre de Bruxelles
- Profession: lawyer

Henry Victor Marie Ghislain, Count Carton de Wiart (31 January 1869 – 6 May 1951) was a Belgian writer and statesman who served as the Prime Minister of Belgium from 20 November 1920 to 16 December 1921.

== Early life ==
On 31 January 1869, Henry Carton de Wiart was born in Brussels into the aristocratic house of Carton de Wiart as the son of Diégo Benjamin Constant Carton de Wiart and Marie Clémence Jeanne Cammaerts. He was educated at Jesuit colleges in Aalst and Brussels and then studied philosophy at the Institut Saint-Louis in Brussels before entering the Faculty of Law at the Université libre de Bruxelles. While a student he spent some months in Paris, where he took courses at the Institut Catholique de Paris and the École des Sciences Politiques and attended Paul Brouardel's lectures on forensic medicine, and also at the University of Bonn, where he took a course in Sociology.

== Career ==
In 1890 Carton de Wiart was called to the bar in Brussels, as an associate of Edmond Picard. He became noted for his courtroom oratory, and published in several legal journals, as well as writing pieces for the Journal de Bruxelles. In 1894, aged 25, he founded the cultural review Durendal, together with Pol Demade and Henry Moeller. As a student he was already taking an interest in the social question and after the publication of the papal encyclical Rerum novarum in 1891 he began to be active in democratic politics, helping found a Christian-democratic newspaper under the title L'Avenir social (The Social Future), that ran until December 1894, and sitting on the board of the Ligue Démocratique Belge. In 1895 he was a co-founder of the newspaper La Justice sociale (Social Justice), which ran until 1902.

In 1896 Carton de Wiart was elected to the Belgian Chamber of Representatives as a left-wing member of the Catholic Party. He remained a Member of Parliament uninterruptedly until his death in 1951. Carton de Wiart attended the Twelfth Inter-Parliamentary Conference, held in St. Louis, Missouri in 1904, meeting members of different parliaments both in Europe and the Americas, and developing contacts in the United States that would stand him in good stead in 1914. In 1908, Carton de Wiart was among the members of parliament who insisted that Belgium assume authority over the Congo Free State in order to put an end to the misrule that had characterised King Leopold's private commercial government there.

He served in the Belgian government as Minister of Justice from 1911 to 1918, most notably introducing a bill on the "protection of childhood", passed in 1912, that established Belgium's juvenile court system and gave the state the authority to remove neglected or abused children from their parents (the Loi sur la protection de l'enfance du 15 mai 1912). From 29 August until 30 September 1914 he acted as one of Albert I of Belgium's extraordinary envoys to communicate the position of invaded Belgium to President Wilson and to the American people.

As a member of the Belgian government in exile during the First World War, he was particularly active to aid Belgian refugees and prisoners of war, and to publicise the Belgian cause internationally. When the war-time government resigned in November 1918, Carton de Wiart lost his ministry. He was appointed honorary Minister of State. From 1919 to 1920 he served as deputy speaker of the Chamber of Representatives, in 1919 also undertaking a diplomatic mission to The Hague to restore strained relations with the Netherlands.

=== Premiership ===
In 1920 Carton de Wiart was asked to head a government of national unity in which members of the Catholic Party, Liberal Party and Socialist Party governed together while introducing a series of substantial constitutional reforms, including the introduction of one man, one vote rather than plural voting, the payment of members of parliament, and the official abolition of the Garde Civique (inactive since 1914), as well as providing for the introduction of women's suffrage when there would be a two-thirds majority in parliament in favour. A little over a year later, when the reforms had been enacted, the government resigned so that elections could be held under the new system. Henry Carton de Wiart was awarded the title of count for his achievement.

=== Later career ===
No longer a member of the government, Carton de Wiart was re-elected to parliament, where he introduced bills on the prevention of abortion, contraception, family abandonment, the protection of monuments and landscapes, and the introduction of family allowance. In 1922 he spent four months travelling in the Belgian Congo, on his return suggesting a number of reforms in education and infrastructure.

After over a decade as a backbencher, Carton de Wiart returned to government in December 1932 as Minister of Social Welfare, serving until January 1934. In 1934 he became Belgium's permanent delegate to the League of Nations. With the German occupation of Belgium during World War II, he followed the Belgian Government in Exile first to Limoges and then to London. After the war, in 1948, he introduced the parliamentary bill for full women's suffrage in Belgium (the legal basis for which had already been laid by the government he had headed in 1920-1921).

In August 1949, Carton de Wiart again returned to government, serving first as Minister of National Recovery (1949–1950) and then as Minister of Justice (June to August 1950) in the administration brought down by the "royal question" of King Leopold III's return from exile, which he had initially supported and promoted at public meetings.

== Personal life ==
In 1897, Carton de Wiart married Juliette Verhaegen (1872–1955), a great-granddaughter of Théodore Verhaegen, the founder of the Université libre de Bruxelles.

Henry Carton de Wiart died at the Deux Alice hospital in Uccle on 6 May 1951.

== Publications ==
Carton de Wiart was an active author throughout his life, not only writing for newspapers, literary reviews, and legal journals, but also publishing novels and memoirs. He was a particular adept of historical fiction. The most extensive (but still incomplete) bibliography of his works runs to 18 printed pages.

His books include:

- Contes hétéroclites (1892)
- La cité ardente (1905)
- Les vertus bourgeoises (1907)
- La Bourgeoisie belge depuis 1830 (1912)
- The Case of Belgium (New York, 1914)
- Mes vacances au Congo (1923)
- Mes vacances au Brésil (1928)
- Souvenirs littéraires (1938)
- Souvenirs politiques, 1878–1918 (1948)
- Chronique de la guerre froide, 1947-1949 (1950)

A second volume of Souvenirs politiques, incomplete at the time of his death, was published posthumously in 1981.

== Honours ==
- Belgium:
  - Croix Civique, First Class
  - Minister of State, by royal decree
  - Grand Officer in the Order of Leopold, by royal decree of 13 November 1919
  - Grand Cordon in the Order of Leopold
  - Knight Grand Cross in the Order of the Crown

Foreign honours

- Knight Grand Cross in the Order of Saints Michael and George
- Knight Grand Cross in the Order of Saints Maurice and Lazarus
- Grand Officer of the Order of Saint-Charles
- Pro Ecclesia et Pontifice
- A road in the municipality of Jette, in Brussels, is named in his honour: Avenue Carton de Wiart / Carton de Wiartlaan.

Political offices
Preceded by Léon Delacroix	Prime Minister of Belgium; 1920–1921	Succeeded by Georges Theunis
