= Firmin van den Bosch =

Belgian magistrate and writer

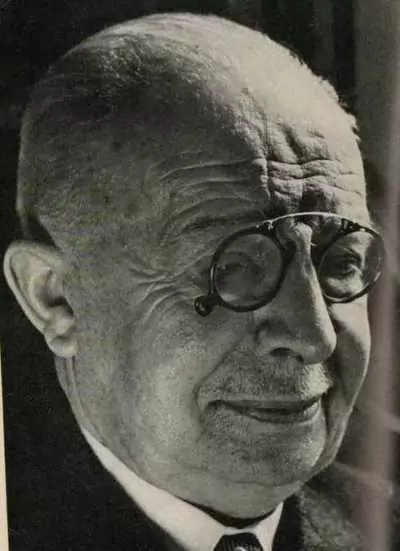
- Born: 19 December 1864; Peer, Limburg, Belgium
- Died: 20 January 1949 (aged 84); Saint-Gilles (Brussels), Belgium
- Education: Junior Seminary, Sint-Truiden
- Alma mater: Ghent University
- Occupation: Magistrate
- Writing career
- Pen name: Un Catholique indépendant
- Language: French
- Period: Fin de siècle
- Literary movement: Catholic literary revival

Josephus Maria Remisius Firminus van den Bosch, better known as Firmin van den Bosch (1864–1949) was a Belgian magistrate and writer.

== Life ==
Van den Bosch was born in Peer, Belgium, on 19 December 1864. His mother died a few weeks after his birth and he was raised by an aunt and his maternal grandfather in Bree.

He was educated at the junior seminary in Sint-Truiden and studied Philosophy at the Facultés Notre-Dame de la Paix in Namur preparatory to undertaking a law degree at Ghent University. As a student in Namur he discovered modern poetry in La Jeune Belgique and began writing. He became friends with Max Waller. As a student in Ghent he was involved in confrontations between Catholic students and anticlerical professors, and was rusticated.

He began writing for L'Impartial de Gand, a newspaper that favoured social reform. In 1886, he began writing for Le Magasin littéraire et scientifique. He graduated in law in 1888, and became a pupil of Jules Van den Heuvel. He won a scholarship that enabled him to study law in the Netherlands, Italy and Paris. In Paris he frequented the salon of Monseigneur d'Hulst and met Georges Rodenbach, Jules Barbey d'Aurevilly, Paul Verlaine and Auguste Villiers de l'Isle-Adam.

Returning to Ghent he again wrote for L'Impartial and Le Magasin littéraire, defending modern literature and attacking the way that literature was taught in Catholic secondary schools (finding an ally in Pol Demade). He took part in the Catholic Congress in Mechelen in 1891, and cofounded the magazine Le Drapeau, as well as writing for the Christian democrat L'Avenir Social. He was on the editorial committee of the review Durendal. In 1897 he organised a literary congress in Ghent.

His legal career led to an appointment as a magistrate in the court of first instance in Kortrijk in 1894, where he met Guido Gezelle. In 1899 he was appointed to the court in Ghent, and in 1901 became public prosecutor in Dendermonde. From 1907 to 1910 he was acting public prosecutor in Ghent, and in 1911 was appointed to the Mixed Courts of Egypt. While in Egypt he organised exhibitions in Alexandria and Cairo, and was involved in creating a university extension programme in Cairo. With the German occupation of Belgium during World War I, he wrote and lectured in favour of the Belgian cause in Egypt and Greece, where he was involved in the Armistice of Salonica. In 1920 he became public prosecutor for the Mixed Courts of Egypt. He retired in 1929 and returned to Belgium, where he joined the board of Belgian national radio and the Revue Générale, and continued to write for newspapers, now under the pen name "Un Catholique indépendant". He was installed as a member of the Académie royale de langue et de littérature françaises de Belgique on 13 February 1937. He died in Saint-Gilles (Brussels) on 20 January 1949.

== Publications ==
- Coups de plumes (1892)
- Socialisme allemand (1892)
- Le droit de réponse en matière de presse (1896)
- La Littérature d'aujourd'hui (1908)
- La Belgique souffrante et militante (1917)
- Sur l'écran du passé (1931)
- Sur le Forum et dans le bois sacré (1934)
- Ceux que j'ai connus (1940)
- Vagabondages littéraires (1944)
