= Le Magasin littéraire et scientifique =

Le Magasin littéraire et scientifique, from 1891 simply Le Magasin littéraire, was a French-language review of science and culture published in Ghent, Belgium, from 1884 to 1898. Initially quarterly, it was published every two months 1885–1888, monthly 1889–1897, and every two months in 1898. It was printed and published by Alfons Siffer, who also published its Dutch-language counterpart, Het Belfort.

The founders of the periodical came from the French-speaking Catholic bourgeoisie of Ghent, and included clergymen, lawyers and politicians. Canon Hector Hoornaert was an important influence, and Jean Casier the main financier.

The first issue appeared in January 1884. Initially disseminated within Belgium, and largely comprising contributions from Ghent, from 1890 Le Magasin was also published in Paris, and from 1892 in Lyon, although the editorial committee remained based in Ghent.

Around 1890 it became a more purely literary review, with Maurice Dullaert, Henry Carton de Wiart and Firmin van den Bosch taking a role. In 1891 the title was shortened to Le Magasin littéraire to reflect the new emphasis. The magazine had trouble competing with the literary review Durendal (founded 1894), and after Jean Casier's death it was wound up.
