= Traditionalism (19th-century Catholicism) =

19th-century Catholic theological viewpoint

Traditionalism, in the context of 19th-century Catholicism, refers to a theory which held that all metaphysical, moral, and religious knowledge derives from God's revelation to man and is handed down in an unbroken chain of tradition. It denied that human reason by itself has the power to attain to any truths in these domains of knowledge. It arose, mainly in Belgium and France, as a reaction to 18th-century rationalism and can be considered an extreme form of anti-rationalism.

Its chief proponents were Joseph de Maistre, Louis de Bonald, and Hugues Felicité Robert de Lamennais. Their doctrines were advocated in a modified form by Louis Eugène Marie Bautain, Augustin Bonnetty, Casimir Ubaghs, and the philosophers of the Louvain school. The fundamental distrust of human reason underlying traditionalism was eventually condemned in a number of papal decrees and finally ruled out by the dogmatic constitution Dei Filius during the First Vatican Council in 1870.

== See also ==
- Counter-Reformation
- Counter-Enlightenment
- Fideism
