= Pol Demade =

Belgian writer (1863–1936)

- Born: 13 August 1863; Comines, Hainaut, Belgium
- Died: 16 September 1936 (aged 73); Ostend, West Flanders, Belgium
- Education: Minor Seminary, Roeselare; Diocesan College, Kortrijk; Catholic University of Louvain
- Occupation: Physician
- Writing career
- Pen name: Jean Suis
- Language: French
- Period: Fin de siècle
- Genres: novel, short story
- Subject: macabre
- Movement: Catholic literary revival

Pol Demade (1863–1936) was a Belgian writer who also published under the pen name Jean Suis.

== Life ==
Paul François Charles Demade was born to a French family living in Comines, Belgium, on 13 August 1863. He was educated at the Minor Seminary, Roeselare, where he became friends with Albrecht Rodenbach, and at the diocesan college in Kortrijk, before studying medicine at the Catholic University of Leuven. His interest in literature was sparked by reading Jules Barbey d'Aurevilly, and he began contributing to the society pages of Le Patriote under the pen name Jean Suis. His first novel, Religieuse, soeur Magdala (1891), was self published.

He obtained a two-year scholarship to the Collège de France and completed his medical training in Lille. Besides his medical profession and literary activity he also engaged in political discussions, coming into the orbit of Henry Carton de Wiart, Jules Renkin and other proponents of Christian democracy. He took an active role in the Catholic Congress in Mechelen in 1891.

Demade was a contributor to the reviews La Lutte and Le Drapeau, and together with Carton de Wiart and Henry Moeller he founded the review Durendal, of which he was sole proprietor 1894–1897. He took an interest in the reform of education, and especially of the teaching of languages and literature in secondary schools. From 1901 to 1924 he was the editor of a popularising medical review, Jardin de la santé (the garden of health) that he had founded himself.

With the German occupation of Belgium during World War I, Demade became a refugee in the Netherlands. He died in Ostend on 16 September 1936.

== Publications ==
Fiction

- Religieuse, Soeur Magdala (1891)
- La Passion catholique: Une âme princesse (1893)
- Contes inquiets (1899)
- L'âme féminine: La grâce, le dévouement, la tendresse (1907)
- Les âmes qui saignent (1910)
- Boutiques d'idées (1910)
- L'ombre étoilée (1912)
- Le cortège des Ombres (1925)
- Les âmes nues (1938)

Non-fiction

- Le programme du doctorat en médecine (1889)
- La littérature catholique contemporaine: Jules Barbey d'Aurevilly, Léon Bloy, Villiers de l'Isle-Adam, Ernest Hello (1893)
- De l'éducation à l'anarchie (1895)
- Le rôle du médecin dans l'éducation (1904)
- Carnets du bon Samaritain: Notes sur ce qui doit être fait tout de suite, en famille, contre les petites misères de l'existence (1910)
- Un projet de bibliothèque familiale chrétienne (1913)
- Lettres à ma filleule: Essai d'hygiène morale (1922)
- La bonne Samaritaine à côté de ceux qui souffrent (1926)
