= Bonalds Island =

Island in Newfoundland and Labrador, Canada

Coordinates: 47°35′20″N 57°17′04″W

Bonalds Island is an island off the south coast of Newfoundland, Canada. Fox Island Harbour separates it from the mainland. The Shag Islands lie to the east and the larger Bear Island to the northwest. Its highest point is about 90 metres above sea level.
