= Carton de Wiart =

Carton de Wiart is the surname of a family of the Belgian nobility. Notable people with the surname include:

- Henry Carton de Wiart (1869–1951), 23rd Prime Minister of Belgium (1920–1921)
- Adrian Carton de Wiart (1880–1963), British general and cousin of Henry
