= Shag Islands =

Islands in Newfoundland, Canada

Coordinates: 47°35′32″N 57°16′7″W

The Shag Islands are a small group of islands in the southern part of Coppett Harbour, off the south coast of Newfoundland, Canada. They lie to the east of Bonalds Island. The southernmost island, Shag Island, is described as "a conspicuous white rock, 12.8m high".
