= Louis de Bonald =

French philosopher and politician (1754–1840)

Louis de Bonald OSL
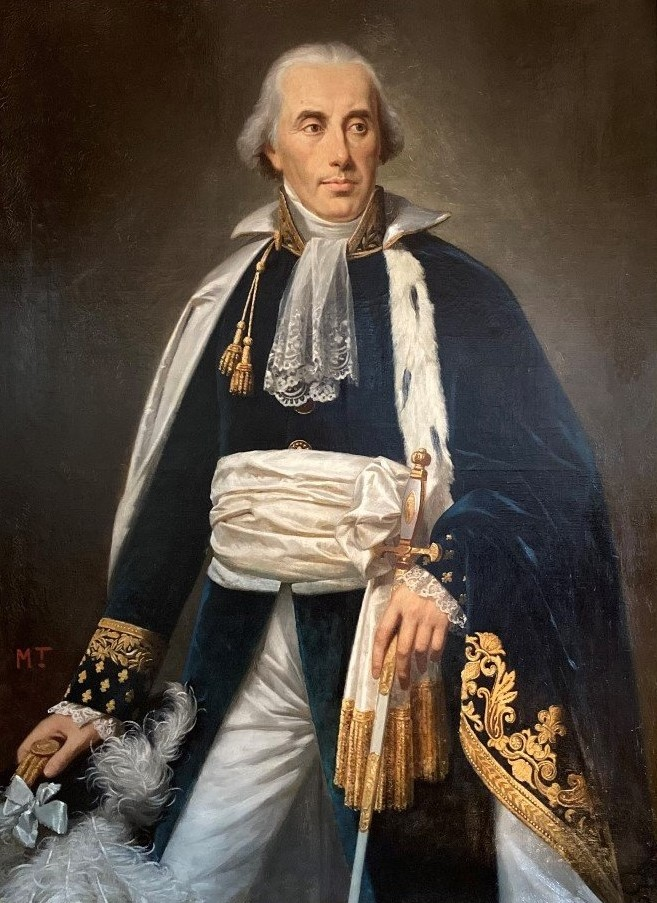
- Portrait by Louis Hersent, 1823
- Born: Louis Gabriel Ambroise de Bonald; 2 October 1754; Le Monna, Millau, Rouergue (now Aveyron), Kingdom of France
- Died: 23 November 1840 (aged 86); Le Monna, Kingdom of France

Philosophical work
- Era: 18th-century philosophy
- Region: Western philosophy
- School: Conservatism; Counter-Enlightenment; Ultramontanism; Traditionalism; Ultra-royalists
- Main interests: Political philosophy
- Notable ideas: Divine origin of language; Social fact

Louis Gabriel Ambroise, Vicomte de Bonald (French: [lwi də bɔnald]; 2 October 1754 – 23 November 1840) was a French philosopher and politician. A counter-revolutionary, he is mainly remembered for developing a theoretical framework from which French sociology would emerge.

== Life ==
=== Early life and education ===
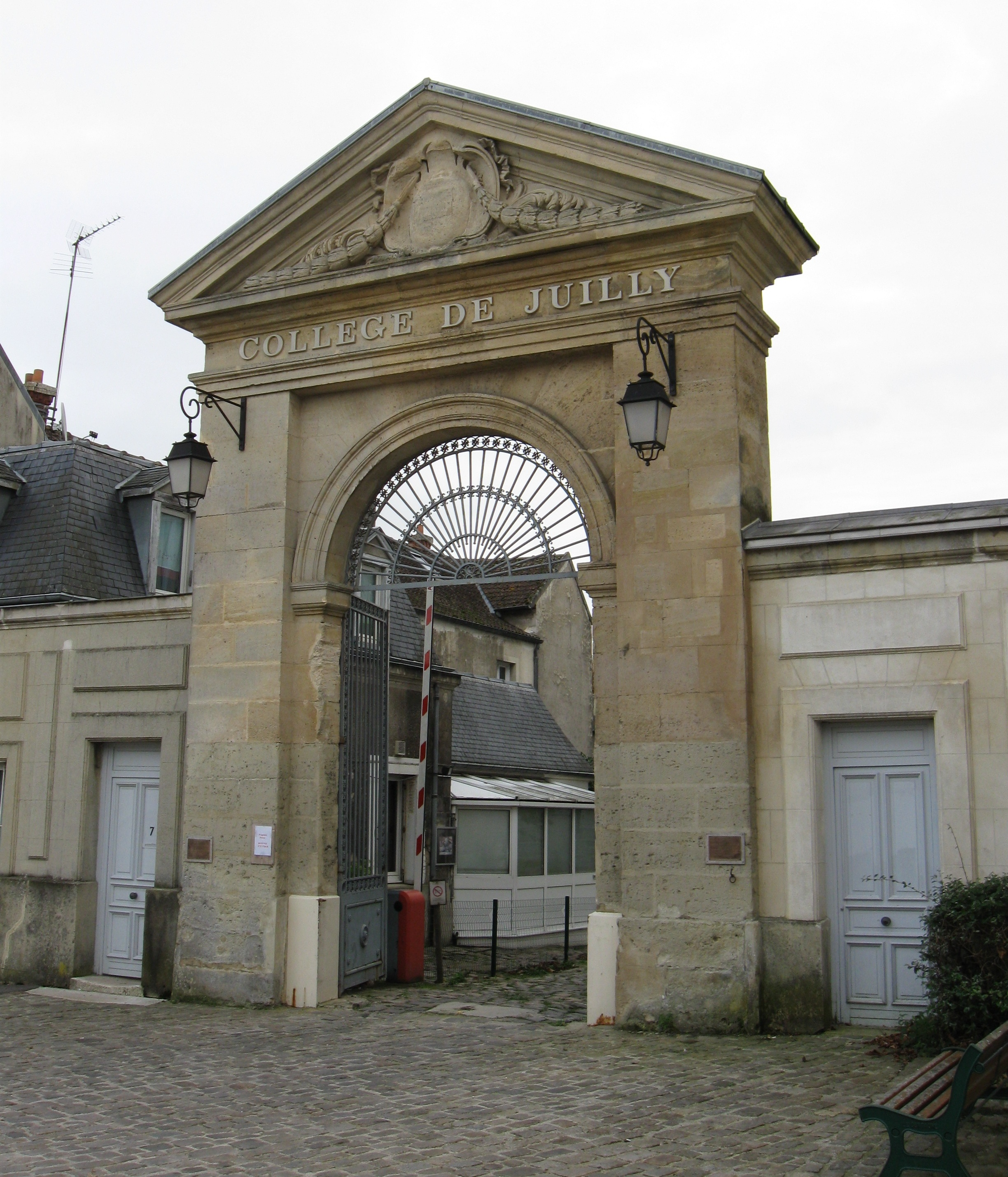
The College of Juilly, where Bonald attended school as a boy

Bonald came from an ancient noble family of Provence. Louis was born in the chateau of Le Monna, a modest estate that served as the family seat. As the only son in his family, Louis was heir to the family estate. Le Monna is situated just east of the market town of Millau, overlooking the Dourbie river. His father, Antoine Sébastien de Bonald, died when Louis was four years old and the young boy would be brought up by his pious mother Anne née de Boyer du Bosc de Périe. Like many in the provincial nobility of the time, Anne was influenced by the Jansenists and brought up her son with a stern Catholic piety. De Bonald was tutored at Le Monna until the age of eleven, when he was sent to boarding school in Paris. He would then move to the Oratorian College of Juilly at age fifteen at the behest of his mother. The Oratorians were known for their rigor and grounded de Bonald in the classics, as well as in mathematics, philosophy, and especially history. The headmaster of the school, Father Mandar, was a friend of Swiss philosopher Jean-Jacques Rousseau, and de Bonald was most likely acquainted with the writings of the philosophes early on.

He left Juilly in 1772 and entered the musketeers the following year. His unit was attached to King Louis XV at Versailles before being disbanded in 1776. After leaving the military, de Bonald returned to his estates in his native region of Rouergue. He assumed the life of a country gentleman, and took an interest in growing his properties and making them as productive as possible. He married a country nobleman’s daughter, Elisabeth-Marguerite de Guibal de Combescure, and the two had seven children, four of whom lived into adulthood. One of their sons, Louis Jacques Maurice de Bonald, would go on to become the Cardinal-Archbishop of Lyon. His other son, Victor, would have a writing career of his own and would write a biography of his father.

=== Revolution and exile ===
De Bonald was elected to the town council of Millau in 1782 and was appointed mayor by the province's royal governor in 1785. He was popular as mayor and after the introduction of election for local officials in 1789, rather than appointment, he easily won reelection in February 1790. He was elected as a deputy to the departmental assembly later that year. De Bonald was at first supportive of the French Revolution and its initial decentralizing tendencies, and hoped the nobility would recover powers lost during the centralization of the 17th century. He even lead the citizens of Millau in drafting a letter of congratulations to the National Assembly, King Louis XVI, and to finance minister Jacques Necker, expressing the wish that "this sacred title of citizen [and] the spirit of concord and fraternity" would lead to a new sense of solidarity. He managed to quell the Great Fear in his region and would earn the thanks of the National Assembly, and he would be elected president of the departmental assembly soon after. However he soured on the Revolution with the enactment of the Civil Constitution of the Clergy in July 1790. Feeling unable to carry out the decrees of the Constitution in good conscience, he resigned from his post in January 1791.

Fearing that his position as a former public official would make him the target of reprisals, he emigrated with his two eldest sons – leaving behind his wife, mother, and his remaining children – in October 1791 and joined the army of the Prince of Condé. He was within earshot of the Battle of Jemappes in November 1792. He soon settled in Heidelberg and later moved to Switzerland. There he wrote his first important work, the highly conservative Theorie du Pouvoir Politique et Religieux dans la Societe Civile Demontree par le Raisonnement et l'Histoire (3 vols., 1796; new ed., Paris, 1854, 2 vols.), which the Directory condemned. His exile would separate him from his family for more than a decade, with only a brief reunion in 1797.

He returned to France in 1797 and largely spent the next five years in Paris in a sort of internal exile. Napoleon was an admirer of de Bonald's writings and had him removed from the list of proscribed émigrés in 1802. This amnesty granted de Bonald a greater degree of freedom to travel and publish his writings. He moved within literary and political circles, and would make the acquittance of writers such as La Harpe, Lacretelle, and, most importantly, François-René de Chateaubriand. During this time he wrote a critical review of The Wealth of Nations by Adam Smith, arguing that the true common good of a nation lies in a shared life of law-abiding virtue and not simply in material prosperity. He would strike up a long correspondence and friendship with the conservative Savoyard philosopher Joseph de Maistre, however the two would never meet. In 1806, he, along with Chateaubriand and Joseph Fiévée, edited the Mercure de France. Two years later, he was appointed counsellor of the Imperial University, which he had often attacked previously.

=== Bourbon Restoration and political career ===
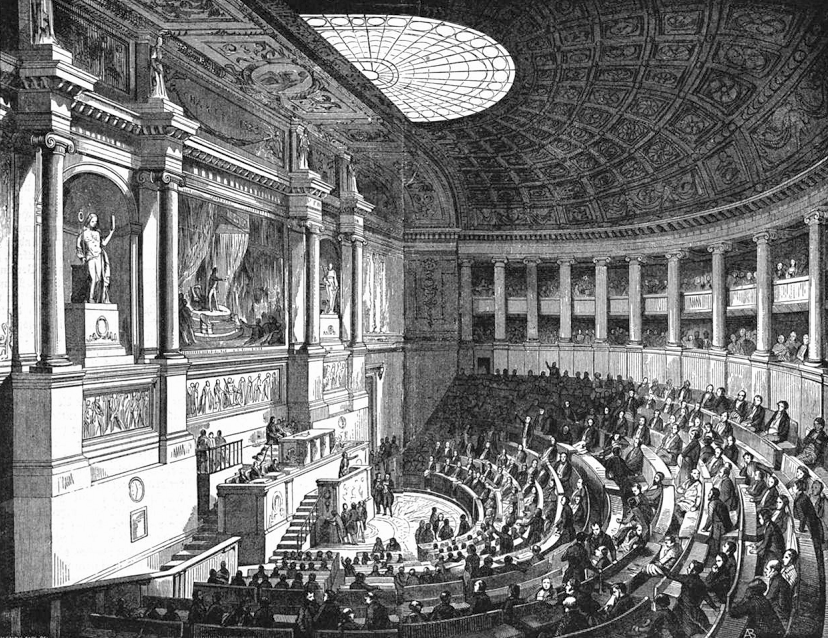
The French Chamber of Deputies, where de Bonald was a deputy from 1815 to 1823

The Bourbon Restoration saw de Bonald's political fortunes increase. He was made a member of the Royal Council for Public Instruction, and in 1816 was appointed to the French Academy by Louis XVIII. From 1815 to 1823, de Bonald served as an elected deputy for Aveyron in the Chamber of Deputies. A member of the Ultra-royalist faction (also known as "Ultras"), his speeches were extremely conservative and he vigorously sought to undo the legislation passed in the wake of the Revolution. He opposed the Charter of 1814, seeing it as giving too many concessions to the revolutionaries and enfeebling the government. He sought strong protections for the traditional family and in 1815 successfully argued for the repeal of laws passed during the Revolution permitting divorce, which afterwards remained illegal in France until 1884.

The Revolution had abolished the remainder of the medieval trade guilds, affording little protection to workers. The Le Chapelier Law of 1791 forbade workers the right to form workers' associations and prohibited strike actions. De Bonald worked to reverse the Le Chapelier Law and reintroduce guilds but his efforts were unsuccessful, and the right to form workers' associations would not be reintroduced in France until 1864.

He also continued his writing career during this time, and his intellectual pursuits led to him visit many of Paris' Salons. Both de Bonald and Chateaubriand frequented the salon of Juliette Récamier, who drew from the leading literary and political circles of her day. He, along with Chateaubriand, contributed to various newspapers and journals, including The Correspondant, a journal of French and British thinkers, as well as Conservateur, a newspaper dedicated to defending the position of the Ultras. 1817 saw the publication of his Thoughts on Various Subjects, and his Observations on Madame de Staël's Considerations on the Principle Events of the French Revolution in the following year.

=== Peerage and later life ===
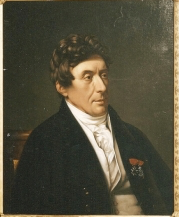
Portrait of de Bonald by an unknown artist

In 1822, de Bonald was made Minister of State, and in the following year, he was raised to the peerage by Louis XVIII, a dignity which he had lost by refusing to take the required oath in 1803. This entitled de Bonald to sit in the Chamber of Peers, the upper house of the French Parliament during the Bourbon Restoration. In 1825, he argued strongly in favor of the Anti-Sacrilege Act, including its prescription of the death penalty under certain conditions. In 1826, de Bonald briefly stepped away from politics due to the death of his wife.

In 1826, the Prime Minister and leader of the Ultras, Joseph de Villèle, introduced a bill reestablishing the law of primogeniture, at least for owners of large estates, unless they chose otherwise. The Revolution had radically changed inheritance law by mandating partitive inheritance, where property is dispersed equally among heirs, in order to break up aristocratic holdings. The proposed law was met with fierce opposition from the liberal Doctrinaires, the press, and even from Dissident Ultras, such as Chateaubriand. De Bonald's On the Agricultural Family, the Industrial Family, and the Right of Primogeniture was written in defense of primogeniture, agrarianism, and the proposed law. The government tried to manage popular outrage by attempting to pass a bill in December of that year curtailing the press, having largely withdrawn censorship in 1824. This only inflamed tensions and the proposed changes to inheritance were dropped by the government.

In 1827, Charles X created a commission on censorship and tasked de Bonald with presiding over it. The position would lead to the end of his long friendship with Chateaubriand, who opposed literary censorship. De Bonald's own attitudes towards censorship were somewhat mixed; he was in favor of taking a hard line on books since objectionable material in this form would be harder to take out of circulation, however he felt newspapers and periodicals should enjoy a greater degree of freedom. He felt that offending journalists and publishers should be first given a warning and then face legal prosecution if they continued to publish material detrimental to the public order. Bonald felt that the censorship practices of the 17th century would be anachronistic in the 19th century, and that the best way to combat error would be through the "marketplace of ideas". Bonald himself had voted against a proposed censorship law in 1817 as giving too much power to the government. He retired from the Chamber of Peers in 1829. Following the July Revolution and the institution of the liberal July Monarchy in 1830, he retired from public life for good and spent the remainder of his days on his estate at Le Monna.

== Philosophy ==
=== Politics ===
Bonald's political philosophy rests on the assumptions of humanity's fallenness, the need for strong government to repress man's evil tendencies, and the belief that humans are inherently social creatures. He opposed the individualistic and atomistic tendencies of the Enlightenment and the French Revolution. At the heart of his political thought was the idea that the family was the basis of society and that institutions should work to protect it in its traditional form. For this reason he opposed the secularization of marriage, divorce, and partitive inheritance. He was also critical of the Industrial Revolution because of its negative effects on traditional patterns of family life.

The sharing of power, as in a democracy, seemed ludicrous to Bonald, and the doctrine of the separation of powers tended towards anarchy. The monarch rules for the good of society and thus represents the general will, contrary to Rousseau; whereas a multitude of individual wills, even when united in purpose, do not constitute the general will.

=== Economics ===
Bonald was an early critic of laissez-faire economics. In 1806, he wrote a treatise critical of usury, or the practice of lending at interest, and in 1810 he wrote a critical review of the French edition of The Wealth of Nations. He was likewise critical of Louis XVI's finance minister, Anne-Robert-Jacques Turgot, a physiocrat who liberalised France's grain trade and supported the suppression of the trade guilds. Bonald criticised Turgot as a "fanatical partisan of a materialistic politics". Elsewhere he says, "[w]heat was not given to man to be an object of commerce, but to nourish him." Shaped by Tacitus and his condemnations of Roman decadence, Bonald felt that economic liberalism and unrestrained wealth would undermine the Christian character of the French people, and would lead men to become less generous and more self-centered.

=== Jews ===
Bonald published an anti-Semitic text during the post-French Revolutionary period, Sur les juifs, in which he described Jews an alien race, describing them with the same racialized language he used to attack the recently emancipated Black slaves in the colonies. In it, the philosophes are condemned for fashioning the intellectual tools used to justify Jewish emancipation during the Revolution. Bonald accused French Jews of not becoming "authentic" French citizens and of being a disruptive force in traditional society. Bonald called for the reversal of Jewish emancipation and endorsed new discriminatory measures, such as a distinctive mark which Jews would be forced to wear to identify them in public.

=== Religion ===
Bonald was one of the leading writers of the theocratic or traditionalist school, which included Maistre, Lamennais, Ballanche and Ferdinand d'Eckstein. The traditionalist school, in reaction to the rationalists, believed that human reason was incapable of even arriving at natural religion, and that tradition, the result of a primitive revelation, was necessary to know both natural religion as well as the truths of supernatural revelation.

Bonald believed that the principles of good governance could be deduced from history and sacred scripture. His political thought is closely tied to his theory of the divine origin of language. Since man learns to speak through imitation, he believed that the first man must have learned to speak from God, who announced all moral principles to this first man. In his own words, "L'homme pense sa parole avant de parler sa pensée" (man thinks his speech before saying his thought); the first language contained the essence of all truth. These moral truths were then codified in Holy Scripture. From this he deduces the existence of God, the divine origin and consequent supreme authority of the Holy Scriptures, and the infallibility of the Catholic Church.

=== Metaphysics ===
While this thought lies at the root of all his speculations, there is a formula of constant application. All relations may be stated as the triad of cause, means and effect, which he sees repeated throughout nature and society. Thus, in the universe, he finds the First Cause as mover, movement as the means, and bodies as the result; in the state, power as the cause, ministers as the means, and subjects as the effects; in the family, the same relation is exemplified by father, mother and children; and in political society, the monarch as cause, ministers/nobility as means, and the subjects as effect. These three terms bear specific relations to one another; the first is to the second as the second to the third. Thus, in the great triad of the religious world—God, the Mediator, and Man—God is to the God-Man as the God-Man is to Man. On this basis, he constructed a system of political absolutism.

== Influence ==
Bonald's writings exercised a great deal of influence over conservative and French Catholic thought throughout the 19th century. The French writer Honoré de Balzac considered himself to be an intellectual heir of Bonald and took up many Bonaldian themes in his writings, once declaring that "when it beheaded Louis XVI, the Revolution beheaded in his person all fathers of families." Bonald's influence carried on throughout the counter-revolutionary tradition in the writings of Spanish conservative Juan Donoso Cortés, Italian philosopher Monaldo Leopardi and the ultramontane French journalist Louis Veuillot. His writings also exerted a great influence over the corporatist philosophical tradition through Frédéric le Play and René de La Tour du Pin, and through them he had an influence on the development of the principle of solidarity in Catholic social thought. Bonald's direct influence fell into decline after World War I, especially outside of French Catholic circles. Since then he has generally suffered neglect at the hands of economic historians and historians of Catholic thought. Bonald's thought has often drawn more positive attention from historians working within the Marxist or socialist tradition.

== Works ==
- 1796: Théorie du Pouvoir Politique et Religieux.
- 1800: Essai Analytique sur les Lois Naturelles de l’Ordre Social.
- 1801: Du Divorce: Considéré au XIX^{e}, Impr. d'A. Le Clere.
- 1802: Législation Primitive (3 volumes).
- 1815: Réflexions sur l’Intérêt Général de l’Europe.
- 1817: Pensées sur Divers Sujets.
- 1818: Recherches Philosophiques sur les Premiers Objets des Connaissances Morales.
- 1818: Observations sur un Ouvrage de Madame de Staël.
- 1819: Mélanges Littéraires, Politiques et Philosophiques.
- 1821: Opinion sur la Loi Relative à la Censure des Journaux.
- 1825: De la Chrétienté et du Christianisme.
- 1826: De la Famille Agricole et de la Famille Industrielle.
- 1830: Démonstration Philosophique du Principe Constitutif de la Société.
- 1834: Discours sur la Vie de Jésus-Christ.

=== Complete works ===
- Œuvres de M. de Bonald, 1817-1843 (A. Le Clere, 14 vols. in-8°).
- Œuvres de M. de Bonald, 1847-1859 (A. Le Clere, 7 vols. in-8° gr.).
- Œuvres Complètes de M. de Bonald, 1858 (Jacques-Paul Migne, 3 vols. in-4°).
- Œuvres Complètes, Archives Karéline, 2010 (facsimile of the Migne edition).

=== Writings in English translation ===
- In Menczer, Béla, 1962. Catholic Political Thought, 1789-1848, University of Notre Dame Press.
  - "The Unity of Europe," pp. 79–89.
  - "On Domestic Society," pp. 89–95.
- On Divorce, Transaction Publishers, 1992.
- In Blum, Christopher Olaf, editor and translator, 2004. Critics of the Enlightenment. Wilmington DE: ISI Books.
  - 1815: "On Bossuet, Bishop of Meaux," pp. 43–70.
  - 1817: "Thoughts on Various Subjects," pp. 71–80.
  - 1818: "Observations on Madame de Staël's Considerations on the Principle Events of the French Revolution," pp. 81–106.
  - 1826: "On the Agricultural Family, the Industrial Family, and the Right of Primogeniture," pp. 107–32.
- The True and Only Wealth of Nations: Essays on Family, Society and Economy, trans. by Christopher Blum. Ave Maria University Press, 2006. ISBN 1-932589-31-7
- In Blum, Christopher O., editor and translator, 2020. Critics of the Enlightenment. Providence, RI: Cluny Media.
  - 1810: "On the Wealth of Nations," pp. 25–34.
  - 1815: "A Proposal to Abolish Divorce," pp. 35–44.
  - 1817: "Thoughts on Various Subjects," pp. 45–52.
  - 1826: "On the Agricultural Family, the Industrial Family, and the Right of Primogeniture," pp. 53–71.

== See also ==
- Anti-Sacrilege Act
- Antoine Blanc de Saint-Bonnet

== Notes ==
Cultural offices
Preceded by Jean Jacques Régis de Cambacérès	Seat 30; Académie Française; 1816-1840	Succeeded by Jacques-François Ancelot
