= Jean Moeller =

German historian

Jean Moeller or Johannes Möller (1806–1862) was the first Professor of History at the Catholic University of Leuven.

== Life ==
Moeller was born on 1 August 1806 in Münster, Germany, the son of Elisabeth Charlotte Alberti, from Hamburg, and Jacob Nicolai Møller, a Norwegian whose conversion to Catholicism had excluded him from public office in Denmark–Norway. His godfather was Friedrich Leopold zu Stolberg-Stolberg. He studied at the Gymnasium in Nuremberg where Georg Wilhelm Friedrich Hegel was headmaster, then in Prague and finally in Dresden, where his uncle Ludwig Tieck, his mother's sister's husband, was then living. He began his university studies in Vienna and later transferred to Bonn. He graduated Doctor of Philosophy at the University of Berlin on 20 February 1830, with a thesis on the early-medieval Saxons. In 1834 he was appointed professor of history at the newly founded Catholic University of Belgium. He wrote several textbooks on medieval and universal history, as well as numerous articles in scholarly journals and the general press. He died in Leuven on 11 December 1862, less than two weeks after his father. His academic eulogy was pronounced by Félix Nève.

Moeller was married to Marie-Sabine Durst, with whom he had at least six children, including the historian Charles Moeller and the literary critic Henry Moeller. One of his sons, Jean Moeller, died of his wounds after the Battle of Mentana in 1867, while serving with the Papal Zouaves. His grandson, Alfred Alphonse Moeller, became a colonial administrator, governor of Orientale Province in the Belgian Congo, and later a businessman.

== Writings ==
- Saxones: Commentatio historica (Berlin, 1830)
- Discours prononcé le 3 décembre 1835 à l'ouverture du cours d'histoire du moyen âge (Leuven, 1835)
- Manuel d'histoire du moyen âge depuis la chute de l'empire d'occident jusqu'à Charlemagne (Leuven, 1837)
- Affaires de Cologne suivies de 27 pièces justificatives (Leuven, 1838)
- "Wallenstein", Dublin Review, 5 (1838), pp. 142-187.
- Deutsche Blumenlese (Brussels, 1840)
- Précis de l'histoire du moyen âge (Leuven, 1841)
- Cours complet d'histoire universelle à l'usage des collèges (6 vols., Hasselt and Leuven, 1849-1857)
- Cours élémentaire d'histoire universelle (3 vols., Leuven, 1855)
- Die Weltgeschichte vom christlichen Standpunkt aufgefaszt (Freiburg, 1862)
- Atlas de géographie historique

== Bibliography ==
- Familien Møller paa Aakre, in Gjerpen. En bygdebok, by J. L. Qvisling. Hosted by Porsgrunn public library.
