= François-Xavier de Feller =

Belgian author (1735–1802)

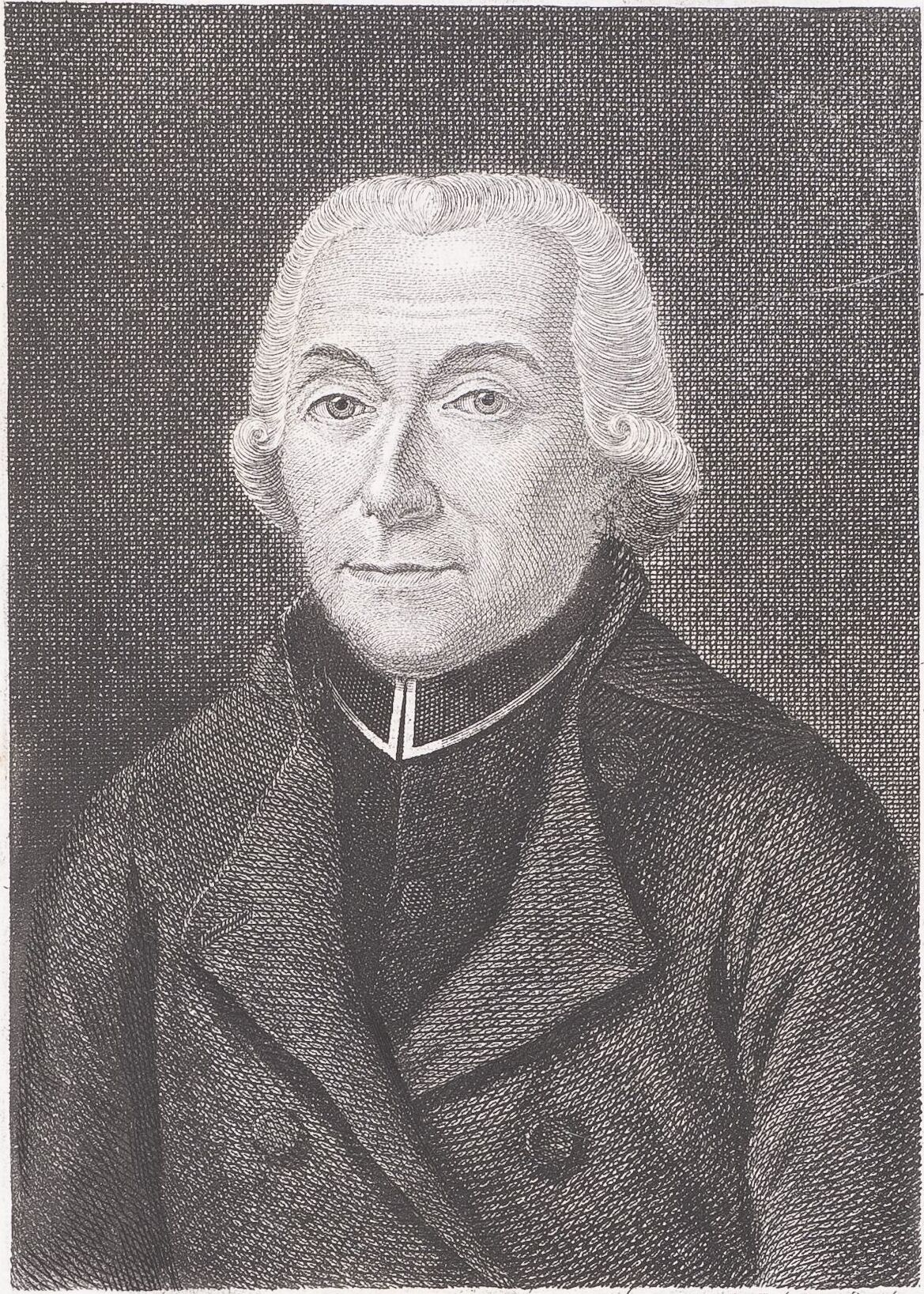
- Born: François Feller; 18 August 1735; Brussels, Duchy of Brabant, Austrian Netherlands
- Died: 23 May 1802 (aged 66); Regensburg (Free Imperial City), Holy Roman Empire
- Occupation: author

François-Xavier de Feller (1735–1802) was a Belgian Jesuit who after the suppression of his order worked as a prolific and internationally influential journalist and encyclopedist who opposed radical Enlightenment ideas on politics, religion and society, sometimes under the pseudonym Flexier de Reval.

== Biography ==
François Feller was born on 18 August 1735 in Brussels, where his father was a government official.

In 1741, his father was ennobled by letters patent of Empress Maria Theresa. Feller was initially raised in the Duchy of Luxembourg by his maternal grandfather, after whose death in 1752 he was sent to a Jesuit boarding school in Rheims. At school he showed great aptitude for mathematics and physical science as well as for literary composition. In 1754 he entered the Jesuit novitiate in Tournai, and in testimony of his admiration for the apostle of India added Xavier to his name. After completing his novitiate he taught rhetoric at Jesuit colleges in Luxembourg and then Liège. In 1761, he published a collection of Latin verse written by himself and his pupils, under the title Musae Leodienses.

In 1763, he began studying theology in Luxembourg. In 1764, the Society of Jesus was suppressed in France and a number of French Jesuits relocated to the Low Countries, putting pressure on the order's resources there. Feller was therefore sent to continue his theological studies at Tyrnau in the kingdom of Hungary, spending five years there but during that time also travelling in Italy, Poland, Austria and Bohemia. In 1771 he made his final vows and returned to Belgium, where he continued to discharge his professorial duties at Liège until the papal suppression of the Society of Jesus in 1773.

No longer a Jesuit, he spent the remainder of his life devoted to study, travel and literature. He was particularly noted for opposing Enlightenment ideas relating to religion, politics and society, describing himself as an "anti-philosophe".

Feller's works exceed 120 volumes. In 1773 he published, under the assumed name "Flexier de Reval" (an anagram of "Xavier de Feller"), his Catéchisme philosophique; and his principal work Dictionnaire historique et littéraire (published in 1781 at Liège in volumes, and afterwards several times reprinted and continued down to 1848), appeared under the same name. Among his other works the most important are Cours de morale chrétienne et de littérature religieuse (Paris, 1826) and his Coup d'oeil sur le Congrès d'Ems (1787). His Journal historique et littéraire was published in Luxembourg from 1773 to 1788, and in Maastricht and Liège from 1788 to 1794; a total of 62 volumes appeared, edited and in large part written by Feller.

In the late 1780s, he wrote in support of the Brabant Revolution and against the French Revolution. On the invasion of Belgium by the French in 1794 he took refuge in the Prince-Bishopric of Paderborn, where he remained for two years. He then moved to Regensburg, where he died on 23 May 1802.

== Works ==
Réflexions sur les 73 articles du Pro Memoria, présentés à la Diète d'Empire, touchant les nonciatures de la part de l'Archevéque-Electeur de Cologne (Italian translation, 1789)

- Jugement d'un écrivain protestant touchant le Livre de Justinus Febronius, Leipzig, 1770 [Luxembourg; sous le nom de Bar(d)t], ca. 56 p.
- Entretien de Voltaire et de M. P. P., docteur de Sorbonne, sur la nécessité de la religion chrétienne et catholique par rapport au salut, Liège, 1771, 8°, ca. 50 p.
- Lettre sur le Dîner du comte de Boulainvilliers, 1771, [s.l., s.d.] 20 p. 12°
- Observations philosophiques sur les systèmes de Newton, le mouvement de la terre et la pluralité des mondes etc. précédées d'une dissertation théologique sur les tremblements de la terre, les orages etc., Liège, 1771, 180 p., 12°
- Flexier de Reval, Catéchisme philosophique, Liège, 1773, VIII, 596 p., 8°
- Flexier de Reval, Examen critique de l'histoire naturelle de M. de Buffon, Héritiers Chevaliers Luxembourg, 1773, 48 p., 8°
- Journal historique et littéraire, Luxembourg, Liège, 1773 - 1794, Maestricht; interdit par édit Joseph II du 26 janvier 1788
- Flexier de Reval, Discours sur divers sujets de religions et de morale, Héritiers Chevalier Luxembourg, 1777, 2 vol., 470 + 465 p., 8° [also in Migne : ... orateurs sacrés LXV col. 9 à 344]
- Dictionnaire géographique-portatif etc., Paris, 1778, 2 vol., [16], 544 + 563 p.
- Examen impartial des époques de la nature de Mr. le Comte de Buffon, Héritiers Chevalier Luxembourg, 1780, 263 p., 8°
- Disquisitio philosophico-historico-theologica, etc., Héritiers Chevalier Luxembourg, 1780, 48 p., 8°
- Dictionnaire historique, Augsburg, vol. I (1781) XVI, 134, 574 p. + vol. II (1782) 692 p. + vol. III (1782) 747 p. + vol. IV (1783) 678 p. + vol. V (1783) 768 p. + vol. VI (1784) 752 p., 8°
- Véritable état du différent élevé entre le Nonce apostolique de Cologne et les trois Electeurs ecclésiastiques, Düsseldorf [Cologne], 1787, 126 p.
- Supplément au véritable état du différent élevé entre le Nonce apostolique de Cologne et les trois Electeurs ecclésiastiques, 1787, 25 p., 8°
- Coup d'œil sur le Congrès d'Ems, précédé d'un second Supplément au Véritable État, Düsseldorf, 1787, 282 p. 8°
- Recueil des représentations, protestations et réclamations, 1787–1790, 17 vol.
- Supplément au recueil : Recueil des mémoires sur le commerce des Pays-Bas autrichiens, suivi d'un recueil complet des pièces relatives à la pêche nationale, [s.l.] 1787, 400 p., 8°
- Lettres concernant la prescription du Journal historique et littéraire, avec quelques notes de l'éditeur, 1788, [s.l.] 12 p., 8°
- Réflexions sur les 73 articles du Pro Memoria, présentés à la Diète d'Empire, touchant les nonciatures de la part de l'Archevéque-Electeur de Cologne. Regensburg [Cologne], 1788, 240 p., 8°
  - Riflessioni sopra i 73 articoli della Pro-memoria presentata alla Dieta dell'Impero, sulle nunziature, da parte dell'arcivescovo elettore di Colonia. Tradotte dal francese (in Italian). Milano. 1789.
- Défense des réflexions sur le Pro Memoria de Cologne, suivie de l'examen du Pro Memoria de Salzbourg, Regensburg, 1789, 130 p., 8°
- Extrait d'une lettre de M.F.X.D.F. à M. le C.A. Tyrnau, 1790, 94 p., 8°
- Itinéraire, ou voyages M. l'abbé de Feller en diverses parties de l'Europe, Liège and Paris, 1820, 2 vol. 507 + 577 p., 8°
