= Dieudonné Stas =

Newspaper proprietor

- Born: 20 August 1791; Liège, Prince-Bishopric of Liège, Holy Roman Empire
- Died: 13 February 1868 (aged 76); Brussels, Province of Brabant, Kingdom of Belgium
- Occupation: newspaper proprietor
- Years active: 1820-1856
- Known for: Journal de Bruxelles

Dieudonné François Marie Stas (1791–1868) was a Belgian newspaper proprietor.

== Life ==
Stas was born in Liège on 20 August 1791. In 1820 he founded the Courrier de la Meuse, with Pierre Kersten as editor in chief. This newspaper supported the Catholic-Liberal union that dominated the Belgian Revolution, although its publication had been suspended by the Dutch authorities by the time the revolution broke out. Publication was resumed after Belgian independence, with abbé Louis becoming editor in chief in 1836. At the beginning of January 1841, publication was moved to Brussels and the title changed to Journal de Bruxelles. Stas retired as publisher in 1856, and died in Brussels on 13 February 1868. The newspaper he had founded continued publication until 1926.

== Honours ==
Dieudonné Stas was knighted by Leopold I in 1848, and also became a knight in the Order of St. Gregory the Great.
