= Jacob Nicolai Møller =

Norwegian scientist and philosopher (1777-1862)

Jacob Nicolai Møller, also known as Jacques-Nicolas Moeller (1777–1862) was a Norwegian scientist and philosopher of the Romantic period.

== Life ==
Møller was born in Porsgrund on 6 February 1777, the son of a doctor. After studying at Copenhagen University and gaining a reputation for brilliance, he passed the Danish civil service exam and was awarded a travel bursary to pursue further studies abroad in geology and mineralogy. For two years he and his friend Henrik Steffens studied together in Berlin and later in Freiberg, under the mineralogist Abraham Gottlob Werner. Møller then travelled to Paris, to study under René Just Haüy and Georges Cuvier, before rejoining Steffens at the University of Jena to sit at the feet of Friedrich Schelling.

After a conversion experience during an illness, he was received into the Catholic Church in Hamburg, on 27 January 1804, the day of his marriage to Elisabeth Charlotte Alberti. His wife's sister was married to Ludwig Tieck. Becoming a Catholic disqualified him from public service in Denmark–Norway, so he sought academic employment in Germany. After some time in Munster, where he was supported by Friedrich Leopold zu Stolberg-Stolberg, he taught at a Gymnasium in Nuremberg before becoming tutor to the young Prince Kinsky. He went on to hold a number of short-lived teaching positions in Dresden, Vienna, Bonn and Dusseldorf, before being appointed "honorary professor" at the Catholic University of Leuven, in Belgium, where his son Jean Moeller was professor of history. He taught philosophy there from 1837 to 1842. He died in Leuven on 30 November 1862.

== Writings ==
Møller published in the Zeitschrift für speculative Physik (edited by Schelling) and the Kritische Journal der Philosophie (co-edited by Schelling and Hegel), as well as in several other reviews, both in France and Germany. Between 1839 and 1842 he published a series of articles on German philosophy in the Revue de Bruxelles.

His books include:

- Speculative Darstellung der Christenthums (Leipzig, 1819)
- Das absolute Princip der Ethik (Leipzig, 1819)
- Johannes Scotus Erigena und seine Irrthümer (Mainz, 1844)
- De l'état de la philosophie moderne en Allemagne (Louvain, 1843)
