= Victor de Bonald =

Victor de Bonald (1780–1871), son of Louis Gabriel Ambroise de Bonald, followed his father in his exile. He was rector of the Academy of Montpellier after the Bourbon Restoration, but lost his post during the Hundred Days. Regaining it at the Second Restoration, he resigned finally in 1830. He wrote Des vrais principes opposés aux erreurs du XIX siècle (1833), Moïse et les géologues modernes (1835), and a life of his father.
