= St Joseph College, Aalst =

Coordinates: 50.937188°N 4.041308°E

St Joseph's College
- Sint-Jozefscollege
- Aalst, Belgium

Information
- Type: Secondary
- Established: 1622; 404 years ago
- Affiliation: Jesuit (Roman Catholic)
- Website: St Joseph's College
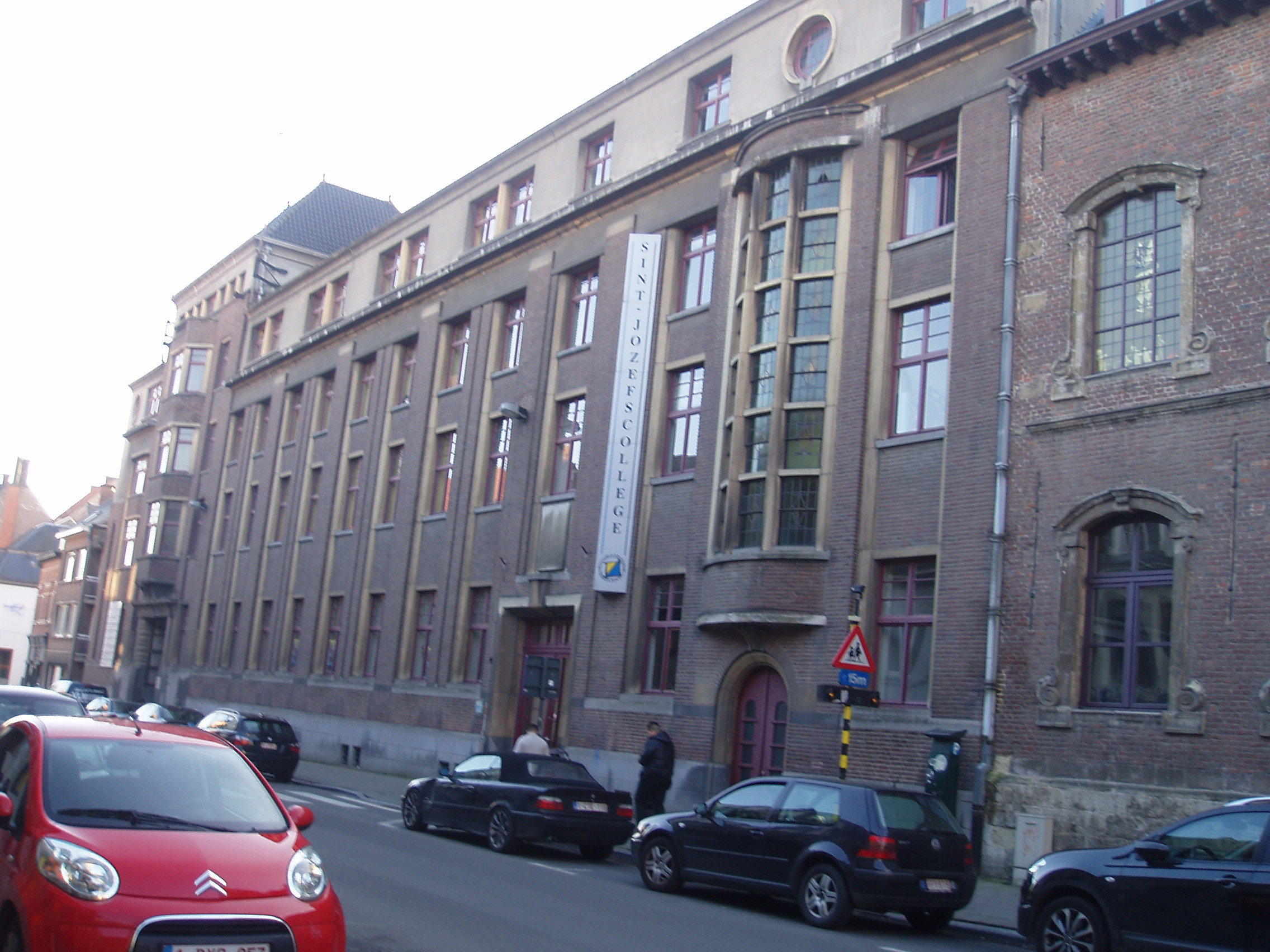
- Front entrance

St Joseph's College (Dutch, Sint-Jozefscollege) is a Roman Catholic subsidized free school for general secondary education founded by the Society of Jesus in Aalst. The school building is a protected monument.

== Teachers ==
- Joseph-Olivier Andries (1796-1886)
- Evarist Bauwens s.j. (1853-1937)
- Emiel Fleerackers s.j. (1877-1948)
- Adhemar Geerebaert s.j. (1876-1944)
- Marcel Schurmans s.j. (1909-1989)
- Desideer Stracke s.j. (1875-1970)
- Lode Taeymans s.j. (1874-1937)
- Constant Van Crombrugghe (1789-1885)
- André Van Iseghem s.j. (1799-1869)
- Jozef Van Opdenbosch s.j. (1892-1944)
- Antonius van Torre s.j. (1615-1679)

== History ==
In 1622, the Jesuits founded a school dedicated to Saint Joseph at the Pontstraat in Aalst. A century later, a church hall with a baroque facade was added. St Joseph College was continually expanded over the centuries and rebuilt. In 1997, the school complex was made a protected monument.

== Former students ==
Notable students of the school include:

- Adolf Daens
- Jean-Luc Dehaene
- Piet Vanthemsche
- Herman Le Compte
- Maurice De Bevere

== Gallery ==
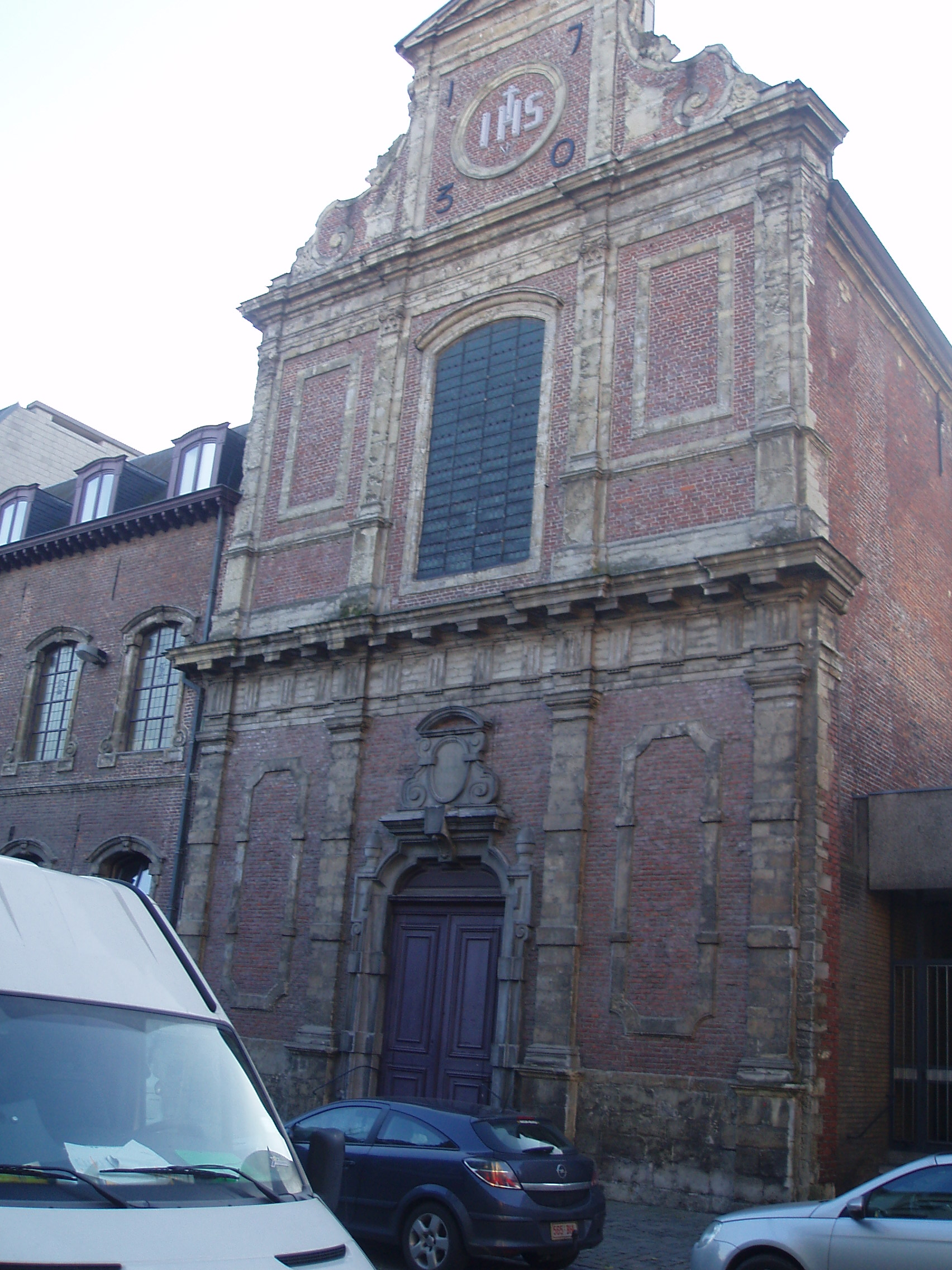
College Chapel

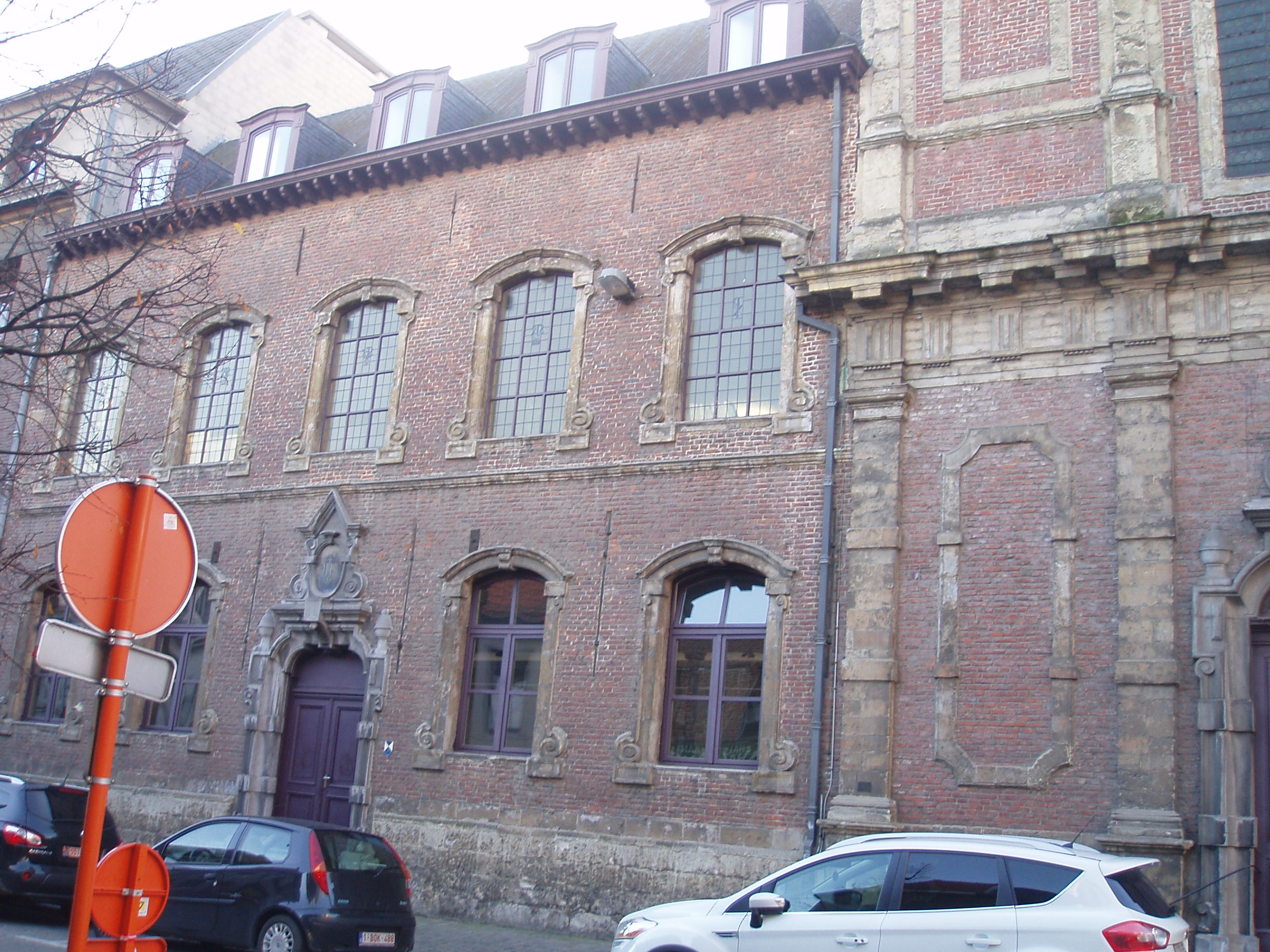
Side entrance

== See also ==
- List of Jesuit sites in Belgium
- Diocese of Ghent
