= Fox Island Harbour =

Abandoned settlement on Fox Island, Canada

- Ghost town
- Interactive map of Fox Island Harbour
- Coordinates: 47°35′29″N 57°17′8″W
- Country: Canada
- Province: Newfoundland and Labrador
- Region: Labrador
- Time zone: AST (UTC−04:00)
  - Summer (DST): ADT (UTC−03:00)

Fox Island Harbour is an abandoned settlement in Newfoundland and Labrador.
