= Workers' association =

A worker's association (German: Arbeiterverein) is a form of political organization that originated from the 19th-century European labour movement. Historically, the primary objective of most workers' associations was to improve the social conditions and employment standards of the workers. Those that survive today function predominantly as social clubs or cultural and athletic centers catering to the working class.

== Germany ==
In the early 19th century, workers enduring miserable living conditions were filled with discontent regarding their standard of living and desired transformative change. However, due to various forms of state repression, German workers were legally prohibited from establishing their interest groups. Consequently, German workers' associations began emerging abroad as secret societies. A prime example is the Deutschen Volksverein, founded in Paris in 1832 by German craftsmen who frequently traveled to France due to the tradition of journeyman itinerancy.

It was only after the Revolutions of 1848 that workers' associations were openly established within Germany. Although the revolutions were busted, the newly formed associations persisted after 1849, organizing collective movements akin to trade unions. Some of these organizations—such as the General German Workers' Association (ADAV) and the Associational Congress of German Workers' Associations (VDAV)—are considered the direct predecessors of the Social Democratic Party of Germany (SPD).

During the German Empire era, religious workers' associations, including Catholic and Evangelical Workers' Associations, were established by authorities and religious institutions. These were explicitly designed to counteract the influence of the social-democratic workers' associations and alienate workers from the socialist movement.

== Sweden ==
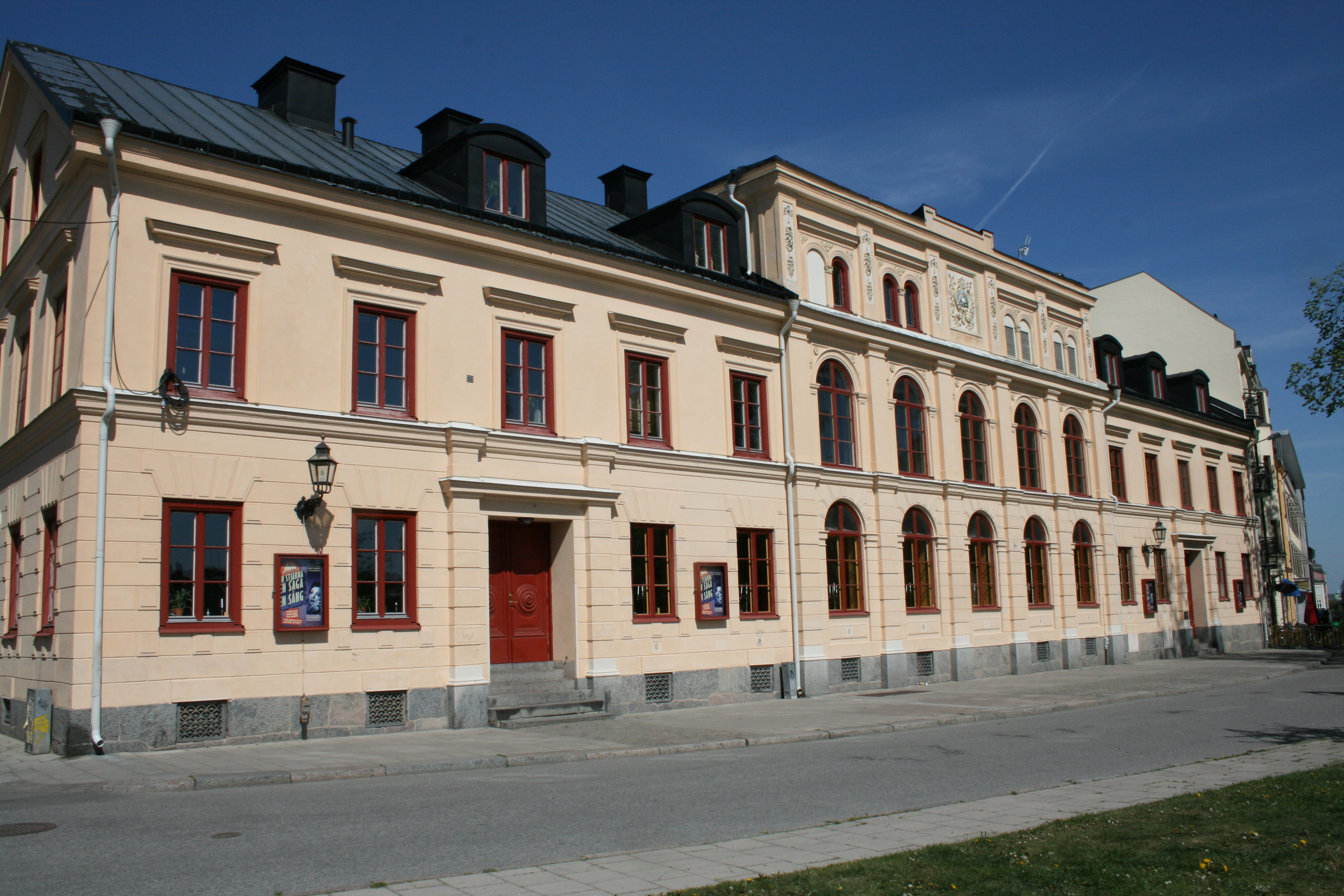
Norrköping Workers' Association.

Workers' associations (Swedish: Arbetareförening) in Sweden can be categorized into two distinct waves. The first wave emerged during the 1850s, a period characterized by workers organizing to foster solidarity through education and cooperative activities. A notable organ of this period was the newspaper Folkets röst, and the preeminent organization was the Stockholm Workers' Association, founded in 1850. Similar associations were established in Malmö, Lund, and Gothenburg.

The second wave began in 1866, originating in Lund and Norrköping. During this second wave, the associations exhibited tendencies toward class collaboration, nationalism, and capital-friendly attitudes. This movement was imported to Sweden from a model initiated by the German economist and politician Franz Hermann Schulze-Delitzsch, with Eduard Ljungberg and Gustaf Axel Knut Hamilton serving as the leading Swedish activists.

Women were barred from gaining membership in these workers' associations. Nevertheless, male Swedish workers who acquired political experience through these associations continued to exert influence in other forms of organizations even after the decline of the second-wave workers' association movement in the 1880s.

== Finland ==
Workers' associations (Finnish: Työväenyhdistykset) in Finland began emerging in the late 19th century, initiated by paternalistic capitalists seeking to secure workers' cooperation and provide them with cultural and educational opportunities. The first workers' association in Finland was the Helsinki Workers' Association, founded in 1883 by Viktor Julius von Wright. In the same year, the Vaasa Workers' Association was established, followed by the Oulu Workers' Association in 1886. The following year, similar associations were founded in Pori, Savonlinna, Tampere, and Turku, with specialized trade branches organized under each local association. By 1895, more than 30 workers' associations existed across Finland. This initial phase of the Finnish labour movement, characterized by the establishment of workers' associations under the patronage of industrialists, is historically referred to as the Wrightian labour movement (Finnish: Wrightiläinen työväenliike).

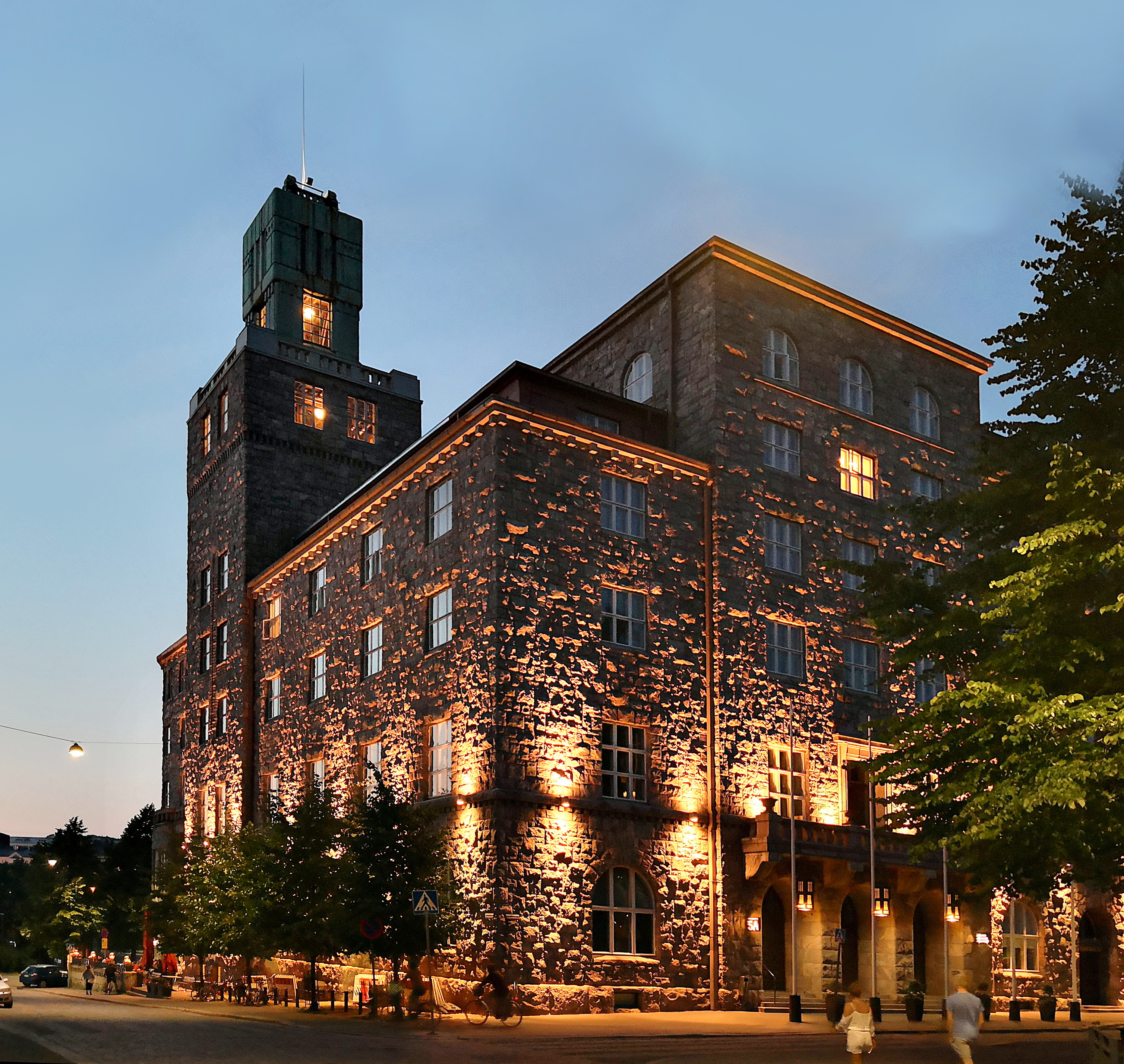
Helsinki Workers' House.

Around the turn of the 20th century, the expansion of factories in Finland led to a numerical growth of the working class who relied on wage labour. These wage laborers, who were relatively radicalized compared to their predecessors, began seizing control of workers' associations sequentially, starting with those in major cities. Consequently, the leadership of the Finnish labour movement rapidly shifted from paternalistic industrialists to the workers themselves. From the early 20th century onward, local workers' associations constructed large workers' houses (Finnish: työväentalo). The first stone workers' house in Finland was the Tampere Workers' House, constructed in 1900. During the 1900s, as the first organizations representing the Finnish working class, these workers' associations served as the focal points for the universal suffrage movement, the campaign for the ten-hour workday, and advocacy for both compulsory education and the establishment of public schools.

The general assembly of the workers' associations from across the country effectively served as the national consensus-building body for the labour movement. At the third general assembly held in Turku in 1899, the delegates resolved to found the Finnish Labour Party. In 1903, the party was renamed the Social Democratic Party of Finland, which remains its name to this day.

Finnish workers' associations wielded considerable social influence as autonomous working-class organizations distinct from trade unions. By operating workers' sports clubs, community halls, and cooperatives, they successfully fostered a comprehensive cultural community anchored by the broader labour movement.
