= Henry Moeller =

Belgian priest and literary critic

Henry Moeller (1852–1918) was a Belgian priest and literary critic, who for twenty years edited the cultural review Durendal.

== Life ==
Moeller was born in Leuven on 12 July 1852, the sixth son of Professor Jean Moeller and Marie-Sabine Durst. One of his brothers, Charles, also went on to become a professor in Leuven; another died serving with the Papal Zouaves. Henry attended the Josephite secondary school in Leuven and the Collège Notre-Dame de la Paix in Namur, and graduated Candidate of Philosophy and Letters from the Catholic University of Leuven in 1871. He then entered the Redemptorist novitiate, but left the order in 1875. In 1877 he graduated Licentiate in Philosophy from Leuven, together with Désiré-Joseph Mercier. He was ordained to the priesthood the same year.

Moeller entered Maredsous Priory in November 1877, and spent some time at Erdington Priory, in Birmingham, but in May 1884 he was refused permission to make solemn profession as a Benedictine. In July 1885 an essay by Moeller, "Etude philosophique sur le bonheur", appeared in Le Magasin littéraire et scientifique. Thereafter he focused on his literary endeavours, which combined Neo-scholasticism and Symbolism, while serving as a parish priest and as chaplain to the school of the Society of the Sacred Heart in Woluwe. In 1894 he was among the co-founders of the cultural review Durendal, which he edited until July 1914, when publication was interrupted by the First World War. He died of the Spanish flu in Saint-Gilles, Brussels, on 17 September 1918. A monument to him was erected in Saint-Gilles cemetery on 12 November 1921, and a prize was established in his memory. A final commemorative issue of Durendal, dedicated to him, was produced in 1921.
