= Journal de Bruxelles =

Belgian Newspaper (1841-1926)

- Dieu et patrie
- Type: daily newspaper
- Founder(s): Dieudonné Stas
- Founded: January 3, 1841
- Language: French
- Ceased publication: May 31, 1926
- City: Brussels, Belgium

Journal de Bruxelles (French pronunciation: [ʒuʁnal də bʁysɛl]) was a Belgian newspaper, printed 1841-1926 (with publication suspended under the German occupation of Belgium during World War I). It was one of the leading dailies in late 19th and early 20th-century Brussels, and was aligned with the Catholic interest in public affairs.

== Proprietors ==
Dieudonné Stas founded the newspaper in Liège in 1820 under the title Courrier de la Meuse, but moved it to Brussels under the new title Journal de Bruxelles in 1841. Stas retired in 1856, when management was taken over by Paul Nève, who ran the newspaper until 1862.

== Editors ==
Alexandre Delmer did the bulk of the editorial work 1863-1871. He left to become editor in chief of the Courrier de Bruxelles in July 1871. The editor in chief of the Journal de Bruxelles from 1878 to 1890 was Prosper de Haulleville.
