= Journal historique et littéraire =

Journal historique et littéraire was the title of two distinct periodicals published in Liège in the 18th and 19th centuries.

== 18th century ==
The first Journal historique et littéraire was edited and in large part written by François-Xavier de Feller and was published in Luxembourg from 1773 to 1788 and in Maastricht and Liège from 1788 to 1794. Originally launched as a monthly publication, from July 1774 it appeared every other month.

== 19th century ==
On 1 May 1834 another Journal historique et littéraire began publication in Liège, on a monthly basis. The owner and publisher was Pierre Kersten (1789–1865). At Kersten's death in 1865 the journal was acquired by the Revue Générale (launched the same year) and it was then published in Brussels until 1868, when it was merged with the Revue Générale. A total of 34 volumes were published.
