= Pierre Kersten =

Belgian journalist and publisher

Pierre Kersten (1789–1865) was a Belgian journalist and publisher, active in Liège from 1821 until his death.

== Life ==
Kersten was born in Maastricht on 19 January 1789. For some years he worked as a teacher of Greek at a secondary school in the city. In 1821 he became the editor of the daily newspaper Courrier de la Meuse, owned by Dieudonné Stas. A Catholic by conviction, in the Belgian Revolution Kersten was a member of a Constitutional Association in Liège that brought together Catholic and Liberal opposition to the government of William I of the Netherlands. In 1834 he left the Courrier de la Meuse to launch his own monthly review, the Journal historique et littéraire. He also worked as a publisher and printer, particularly of liturgical books. He died in Liège on 5 January 1865.

== Works ==
- Epitome Novi Testamenti (1821)
- De rebus belgicis libri quindecim (1830)
- Choix de petites instructions, à l'usage de MM. les curés et vicaires des villes et des campagnes (5 vols., 1830)
- Entretiens d'un père avec sa fille, lorsqu'elle se préparait à faire sa première communion (1834)
- Notice sur la révérende mère Joseph de Jésus (Anne Capitaine), religieuse carmélite (1848)
- Essai sur l'activité du principe pensant considérée dans l'institution du langage (3 vols., 1851–1863)
