= Durendal (magazine) =

Review published in Belgium

Durendal was a cultural and literary review published in Belgium from January 1894 to July 1914, when publication was interrupted by the First World War. A final commemorative issue appeared in 1921. It was founded by the politician Henry Carton de Wiart, the novelist Pol Demade, and the priest and literary critic Henry Moeller, who was to be the main editor.

Founded by progressive Catholics directly influenced by the Catholic literary revival in France, Durendal also published non-Catholic writers. Although free of any aesthetic partisanship, the review rapidly tended to Idealism and Symbolism, with Pre-Raphaelite and Wagnerian influences.

In 1899–1900, the review sponsored a "Salon of Religious Art".
