= Adrian Bancker =

Colonial silversmith

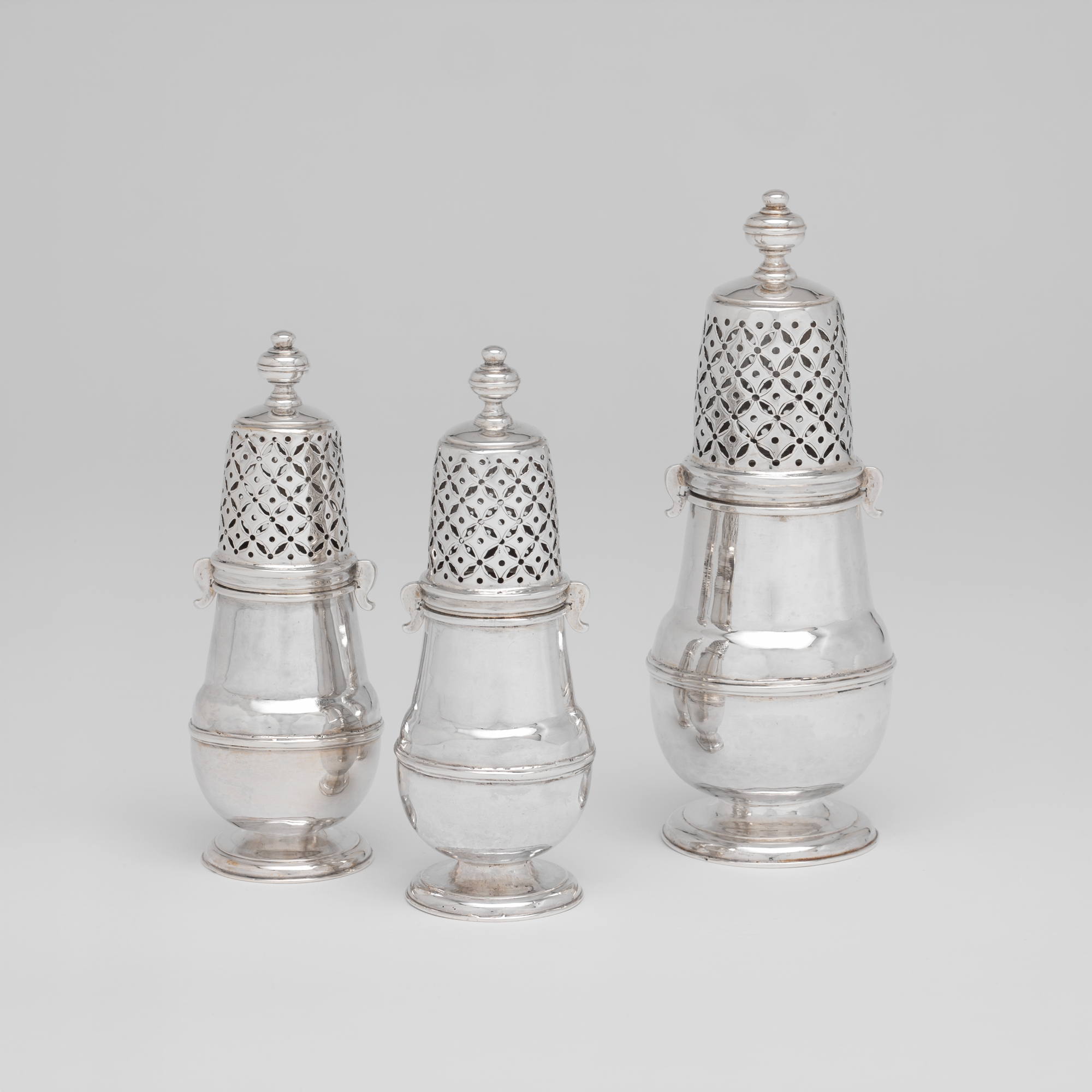
Casters, 1735, Metropolitan Museum of Art.

Adrian Bancker (1703 – August 21, 1772), also known as Adriaan or Adrianus Bancker, was a prominent silversmith in New York City.

Bancker was the son of Evert Bancker, third mayor of Albany, New York, and baptized on October 10, 1703, in Albany. He was apprenticed to Henricus Boelen circa 1718 and made a freeman in 1731. In January of either 1728 or 1729 he married Gertrude Elizabeth Van Taerling, the daughter of Jan van Taerling, a former governor of Curaçao. He was a New York City alderman during the 1730s and 40s, a deacon in the Dutch Church, Commissioner of Fortifications in New York in 1755 and 1756, and from 1733 to 1766 was collector of the South Ward. In 1766 he advertised as being on Bridge Street, near the Exchange. He died in Albany on August 21, 1772.

Bancker's work is collected in the Metropolitan Museum of Art, Winterthur, the Museum of the City of New York, the Clark Art Institute, and the Minneapolis Institute of Art.

== Gallery ==
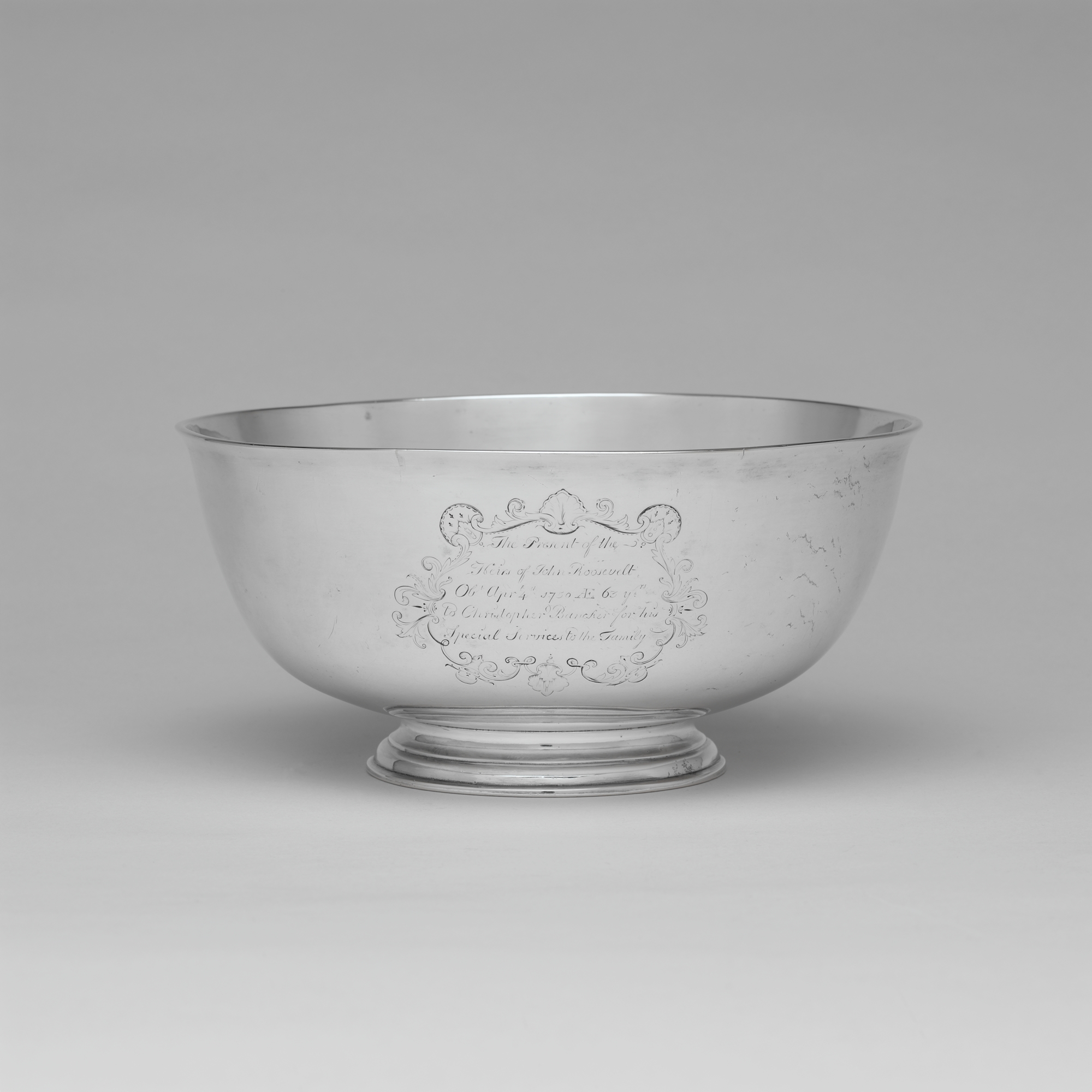
Punch Bowl, 1750, Metropolitan Museum of Art

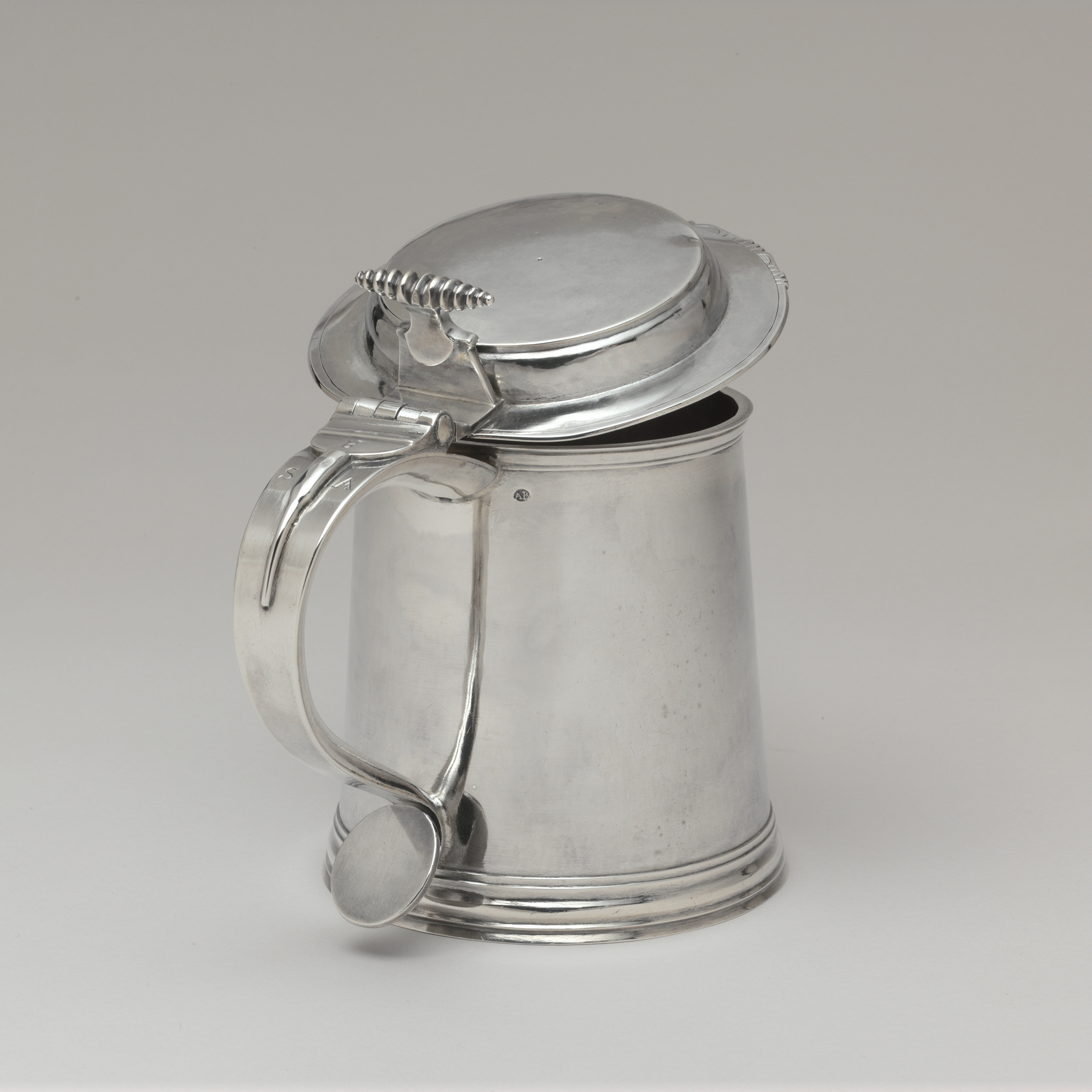
Tankard, 1731–50,Metropolitan Museum of Art

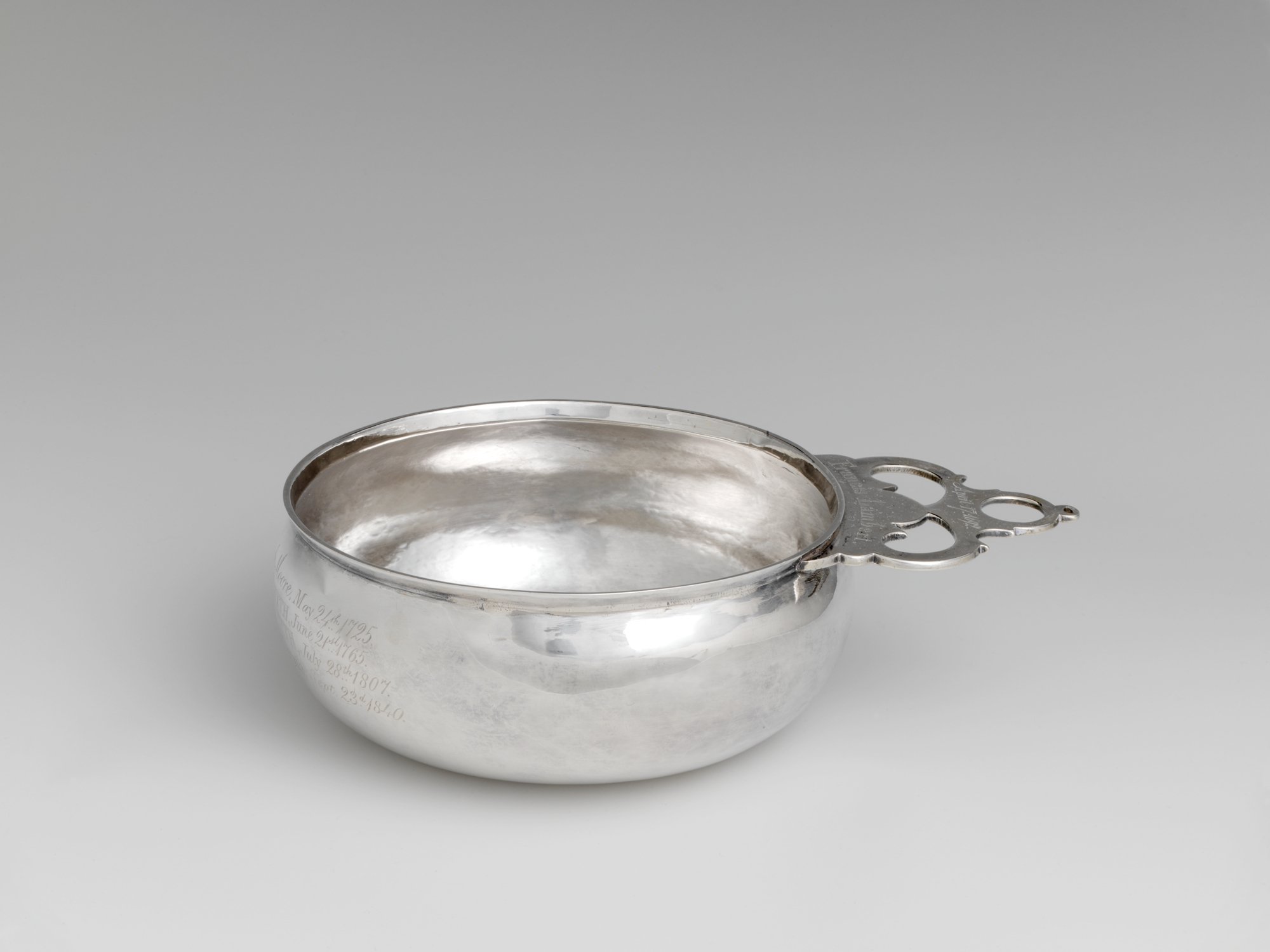
Porringer, 1730–1750, Metropolitan Museum of Art

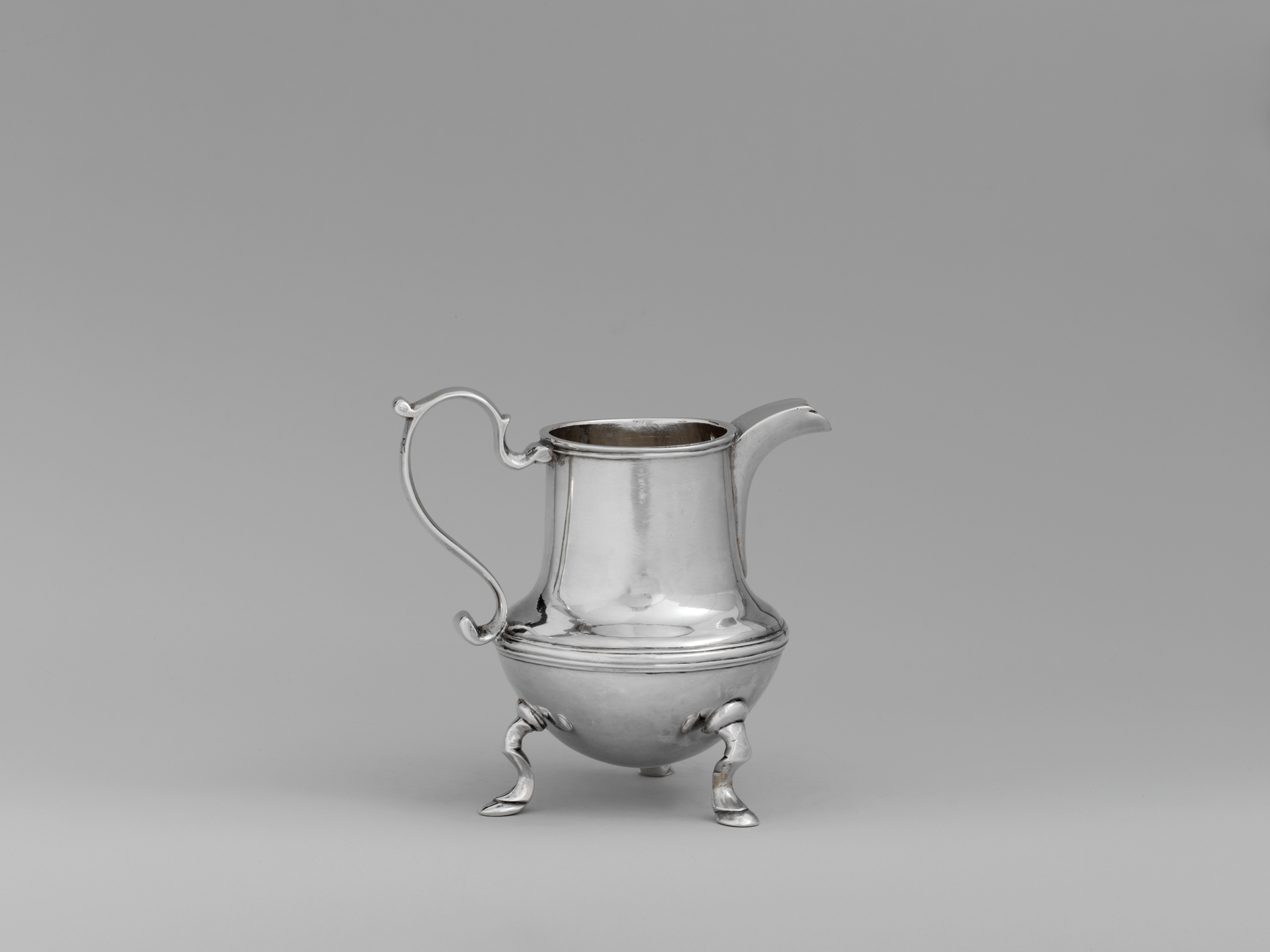
Creampot, 1730–45, Metropolitan Museum of Art

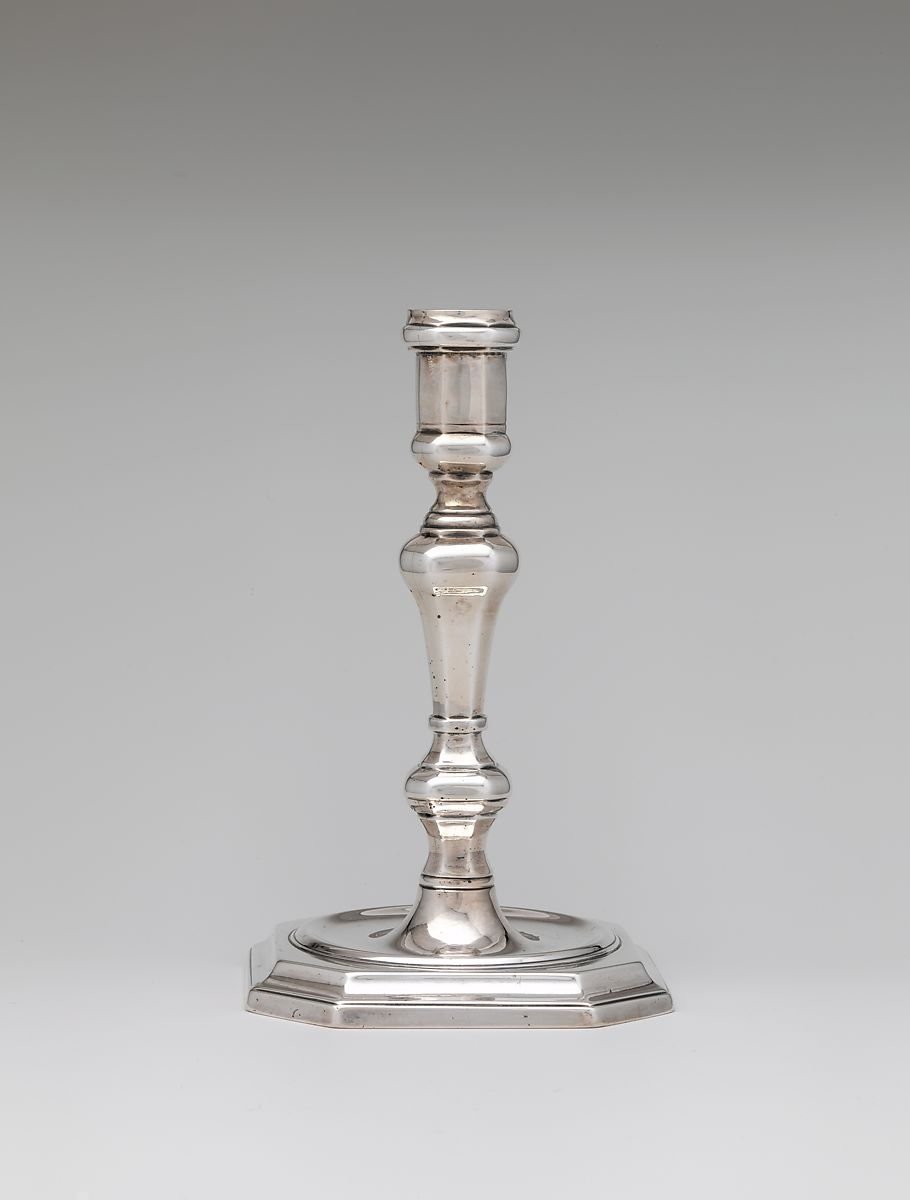
Candlestick, 1730–1750, Metropolitan Museum of Art

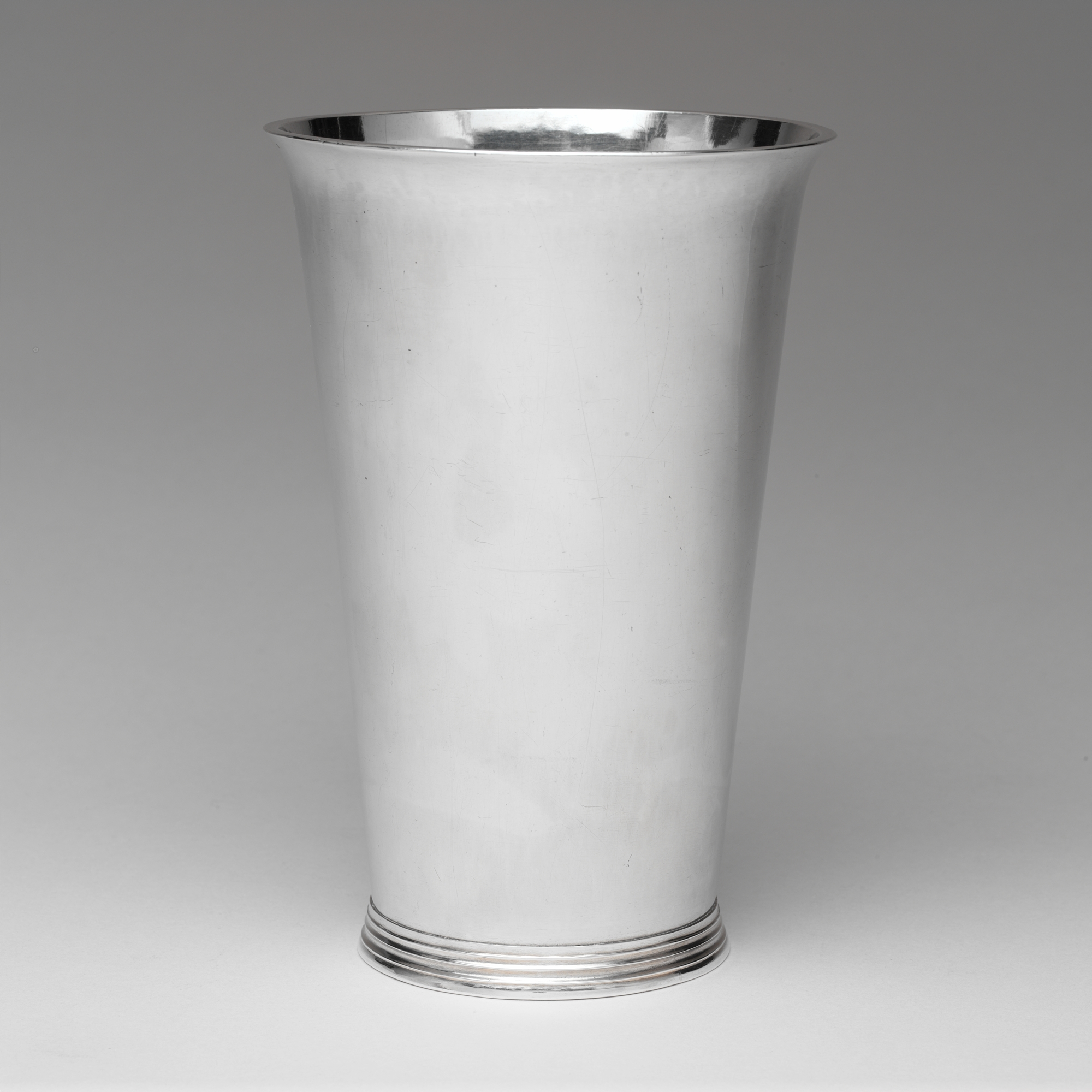
Beaker, 1730–1770, Metropolitan Museum of Art

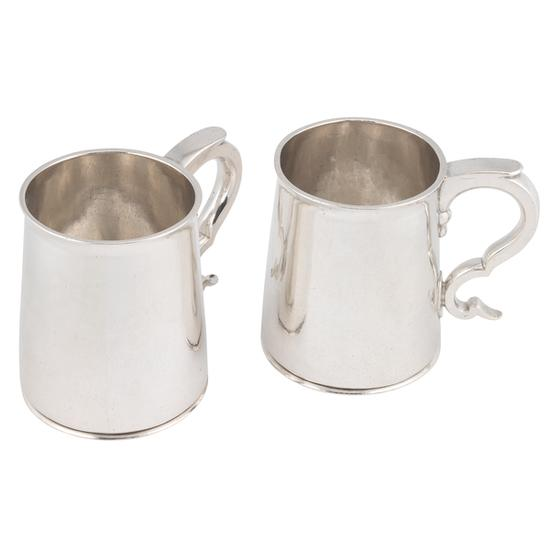
Mug, 1731–1750, Museum of the City of New York

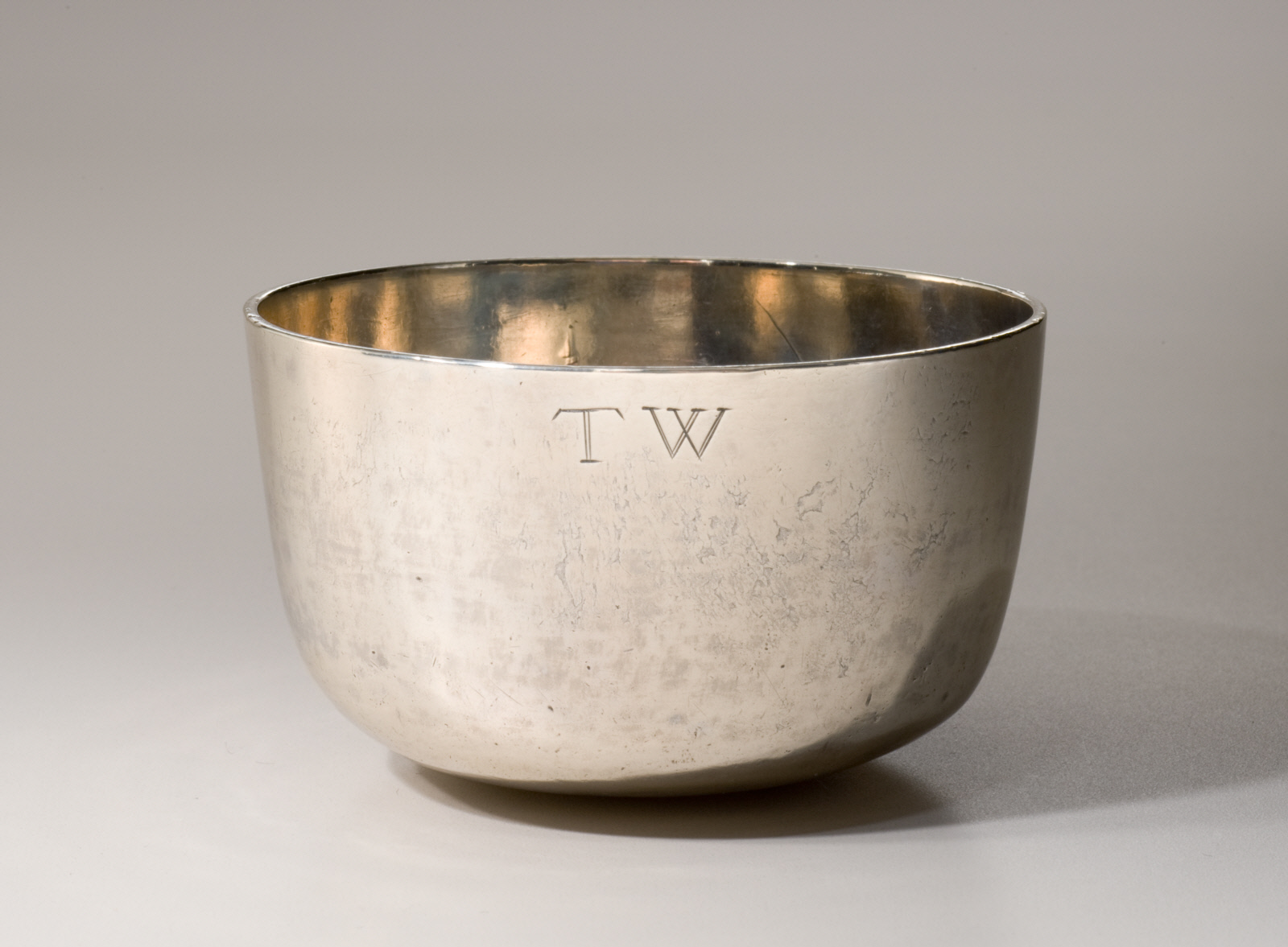
Tumbler, 1730, Clark Art Institute
