= Jacob Boelen =

17th century American silversmith

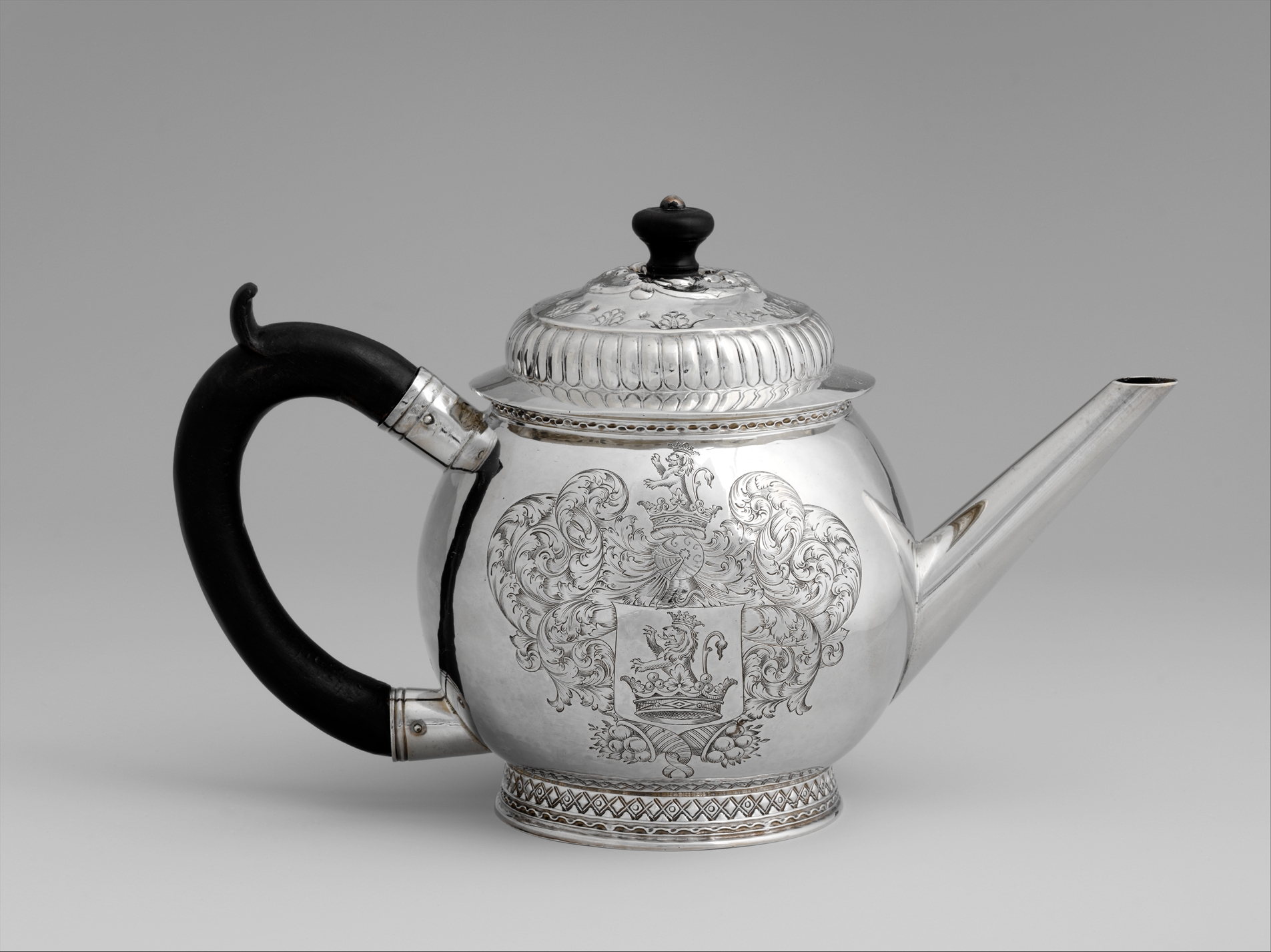
Teapot by Jacob Boelen, between 1690 and 1700, in the Metropolitan Museum of Art

Jacob Boelen (c. 1657 – April 4, 1729) was an early American silversmith, active in New York City. He was father to silversmith Henricus Boelen.

Boelen was born in Amsterdam, and brought to New York with his family in 1659. In 1676 he was admitted to the Dutch Church, and married Katharina Klock on May 21, 1679. He became a freeman in 1698, and served as alderman of the North Ward from 1695 to 1701. In 1702 he also served as a juror in the trial of Colonel Nicholas Bayard for high treason. His works are collected in the Metropolitan Museum of Art, Winterthur Museum, and Yale University Art Gallery.
