= Henricus Boelen =

American silversmith (1697–1755)

- Born: Henricus Boelen II; May 5, 1697; New York City
- Died: August 27, 1755 (aged 58)
- Occupation: Silversmith
- Spouse: Jannetje Waldron (m. 1718)
- Children: 1
- Father: Jacob Boelen

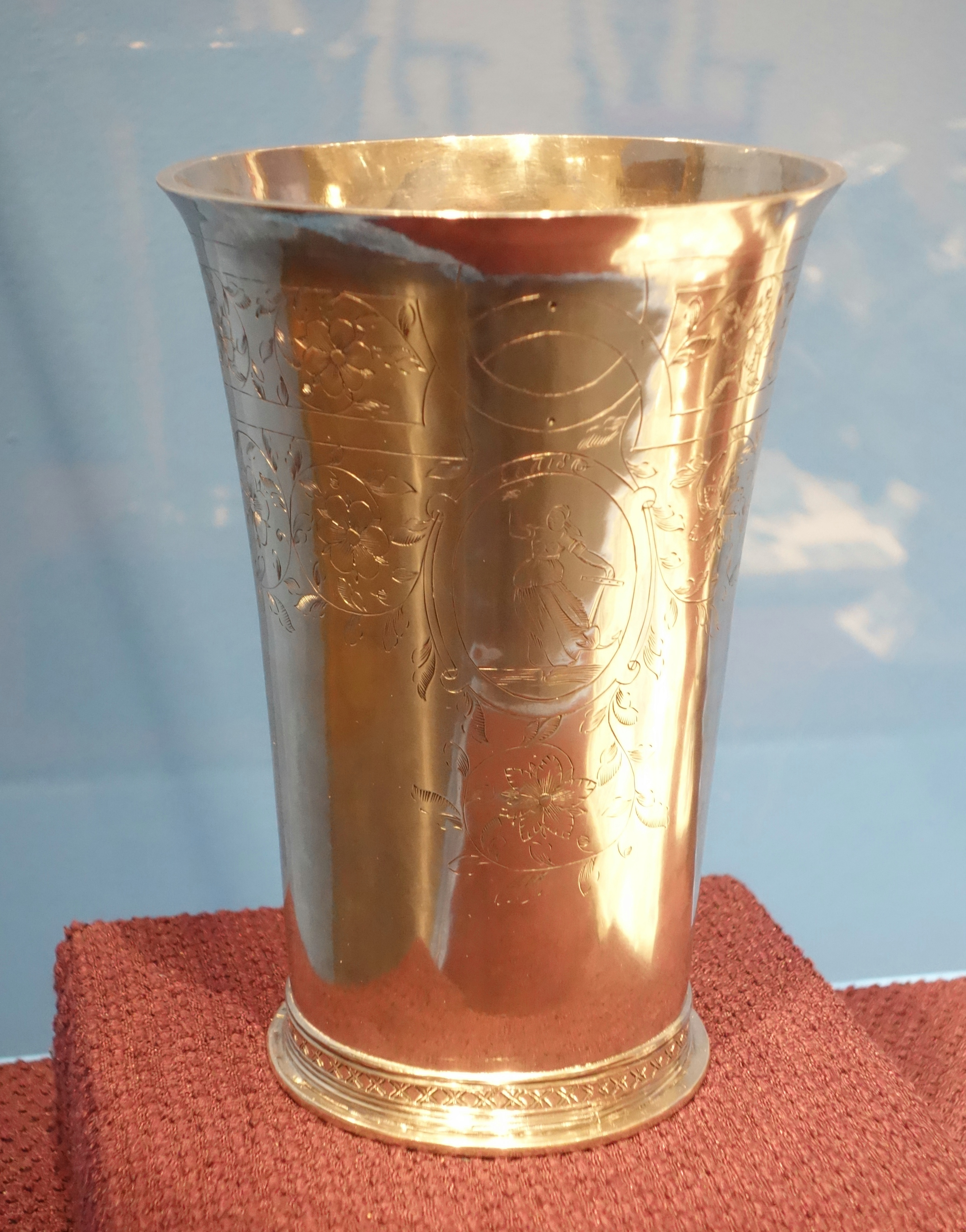
Beaker by Henricus Boelen, New York, 1700s, silver

Henricus Boelen II (May 5, 1697 – August 27, 1755) was a silversmith active in New York City when it was part of the Province of New York.

Boelen was born in New York City, the son and apprentice of Dutch immigrant silversmith, Jacob Boelen I, who willed his business to Henricus in 1729. He became a freeman in 1718, married Jannetje Waldron on June 19, 1718, and served as master to his own son, Jacob Boelen II, around 1746. Boelen's pieces are collected in major museums, including the Brooklyn Museum, Yale University museum, and Winterthur Museum.
