= Araceli Limcaco-Dans =

Filipino artist and painter

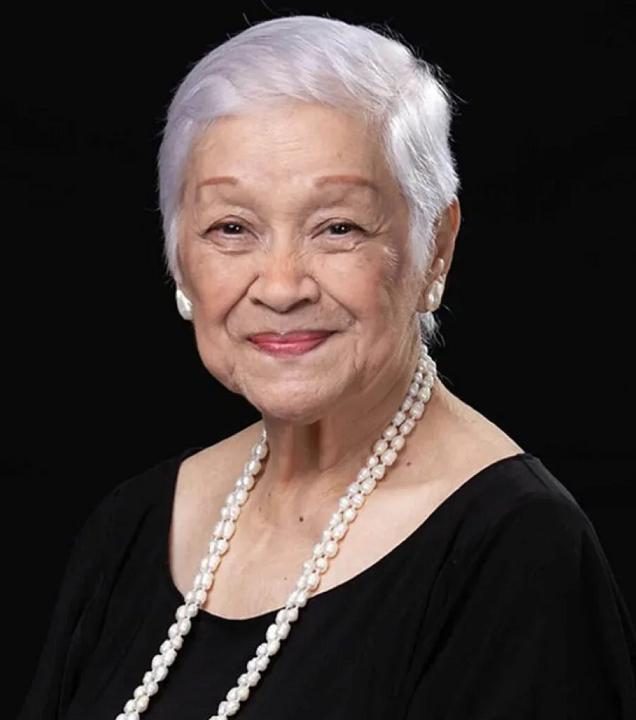
- Born: December 9, 1929; Manila, Philippines
- Died: May 18, 2024 (aged 94); Quezon City, Philippines
- Other name: Cheloy Dans
- Education: University of the Philippines
- Style: Still life, realism, portraits
- Spouse: Jose P. Dans, Jr. (died in 1998)
- Awards: Cultural Center of the Phillppines' Centennial Award for the Arts
- Honours: Presidential Medal of Merit

Araceli Limcaco-Dans (December 9, 1929 – May 18, 2024) was a Filipino painter and educator. She is renowned for her work using calado embroidery in different mediums. Her early work started with portraits, but soon moved to still life and realism later in her career.

== Early life and education ==
Araceli Limcaco-Dans was born in Manila to Eleuterio Limcaco, an insurance salesman, and Regina Fernandez, a housewife. Her childhood was strife with constant fighting between parents, financial difficulties, and economic instability due to war. At a young age, Araceli managed to find escape and solace through art, and soon found it to be a necessity once her parents separated and she became the sudden breadwinner. Her mother, now a single mother of four, needed to balance finances to support "Cely" and her siblings Fidelis, Ofelia, and Regina. Cely would help and earn extra money by selling portraits. Her brother Fidelis would grow up to be a priest and in 1975, was ordained by Archbishop Jaime Cardinal Sin as the first parish priest of the Good Shepherd Shrine and Parish, now known as the Novaliches Cathedral.

Seeing her advanced skills in drawing, Cely's father enrolled her at the Santa Rosa College in Intramuros, where she was the only child among adults in class. She started drawing propaganda comics during the Japanese occupation, and further honed her talent in commissioning portraits by drawing American soldiers during her high school years at the Philippine Women's University.

Her prodigious skills caught the attention of then-Dean and National Artist Fernando Amorsolo, who admitted her at the University of the Philippines School of Fine Arts. Amorsolo became a mentor and friend, and would put Cely in the senior classes even though she was just a freshman. Eventually she was allowed to graduate after just three years in college. Her classmates were Juvenal Sanso, Pitoy Moreno, Larry Alcala, and Napoleon Abueva, among others. She completed her degree in Painting in 1950.

== Career ==
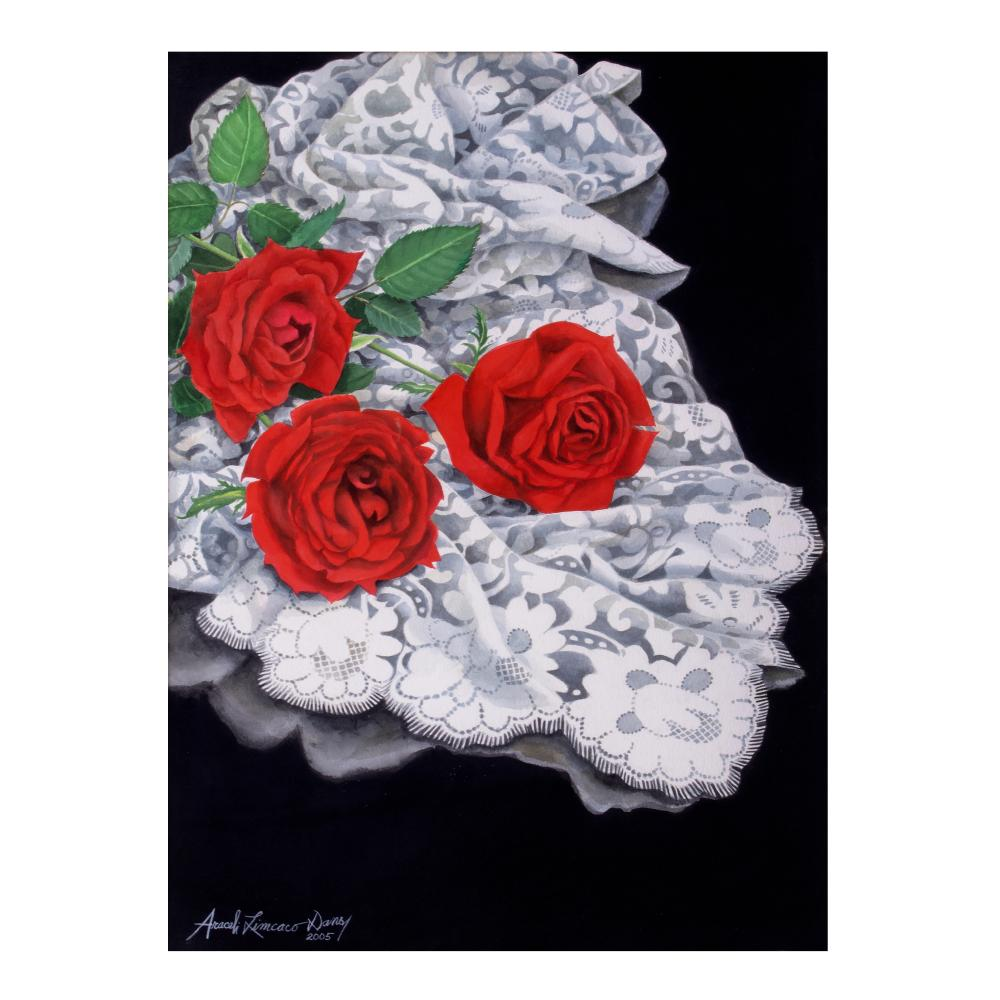
Simoy ng Pula, 2005, watercolor

Now going by the nickname "Cheloy", she helped founded the Department of Fine Arts at the Philippine Women's University in 1950. Cheloy also helped re-establish the art program of the Ateneo de Manila Grade School Department in 1963. From 1964 to 1968, she hosted the Ateneo Educational Television. In 1968, she co-founded the Philippine Art Educators Association with Brenda Fajardo, serving as its first President. In the late 90s, Cheloy served as President of the UP Fine Arts Alumni Association.

While she started with portraits, a vast majority of her works used still life by infusing inanimate objects with the subject of realism. Her favorite objects were ones usually found in her own garden - flowers, dry leaves, rakes, brooms, wire hangers, and cardboard boxes - which usually depicted Filipino life in poverty. Cheloy's own personal experiences were used as a theme throughout her career, as were womanhood, love, loss, faith, sin, and hope. Her art was mostly done in watercolor, acrylic, or oil.

Cheloy also experimented with paper clay sculpture, culminating in a 2016 exhibit called "Ang Mundo ni Inay".

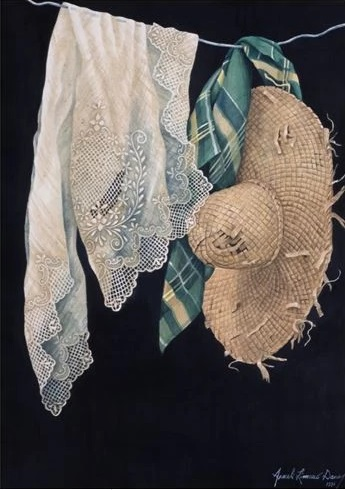
Sumbrero ni Mang Temyong, 1991, watercolor

Her most acclaimed work was her intricate calado series of paintings. Calado is a traditional Filipino open thread pattern woven from pineapple fiber, usually used for making the barong tagalog. Cheloy's works are featured in many landmarks, such as the National Museum of Fine Arts, the Ayala Museum, BenCab Museum, the Coconut Palace, the Regina Rica, and Quiapo Church.

Cheloy received numerous awards recognizing her work, most notably, the Mariang Maya Award for Outstanding Achievement in Visual Arts by the UP Sigma Delta Phi in 1993, and the Cultural Center of the Philippines' Centennial Award for Painting and Art Education in 1999. In 2018, she became a recipient of the Presidential Medal of Merit.

Dans' career spans eight decades of teaching and painting. She is widely considered and respected as a trailblazer in Philippine art education.

== Family life and later years ==
Upon graduating in 1950, and heeding the advice of spiritual mentor, principal and dean Fr. John Delaney, Cheloy married her college sweetheart, engineer Jose P. Dans, Jr.. They had 10 children and 29 grandchildren. Jose Jr. went on to serve under the Marcos administration as the country's first ever Secretary (then known as Minister) of Transportation and Communication. He died in 1998.

Cheloy died on May 18, 2024, at the age of 94.
