= Hipólito =

Hipólito, Hipolito or Hypólito is a masculine given name and surname related to Hippolyte. People so named include:

== Given name ==
- Hipolito Arenas (1907–1995), Negro league baseball player
- Hipólito or Hippolyte Bouchard (1780–1837), French-born Argentine corsair
- Hipólito Boaventura Caron (1862–1892), Brazilian painter and designer
- Hipólito Brown (born 1957), Venezuelan sprinter
- Hipólito da Costa (1774–1823), Brazilian journalist and diplomat considered the "father of the Brazilian press"
- Hipólito Fernández Serrano (born 1977), Spanish retired footballer known as Poli
- Hipólito Anacarsis Lanús (1820–1888), Argentine entrepreneur
- Hipólito Lázaro (1887–1974), Catalan-Spanish opera singer
- Hipólito Mejía (born 1941), Dominican politician, President of the Dominican Republic from 2000 to 2004
- Hipólito Peña (born 1964), Dominican former Major League Baseball pitcher
- Hipólito Pichardo (born 1969), Dominican former Major League Baseball pitcher
- Hipólito Ramos (born 1956), Cuban retired boxer
- Hipólito Reyes Larios (1946–2021), Mexican Roman Catholic prelate, bishop and archbishop
- Hipólito Ruiz López (1754–1816), Spanish botanist
- Hipólito Rincón (born 1957), Spanish former footballer
- Hipólito Rodríguez Caorsi (1939–2012), Uruguayan lawyer and judge, member of the Supreme Court of Uruguay
- Hipólito Unanue (1755–1833), Peruvian physician, naturalist, meteorologist, cosmographer, first Minister of Finance of Peru, Minister of Foreign Affairs, politician and university professor
- Hipólito Yrigoyen (1852–1933), Argentine politician, two-time President of Argentina

== Surname ==
- Carlos Hipólito (born 1956), Spanish actor
- Daniele Hypólito (born 1984), Brazilian artistic gymnast
- Dante Hipolito (born 1959), Filipino artist
- Diego Hypólito (born 1986), Brazilian artistic gymnast, brother of Daniele
- Mário Hipólito (born 1985), Angolan football goalkeeper
- Moisés Hipólito (born 1992), Mexican footballer
- Pedro Hipólito (born 1978), Portuguese football manager and former player
- Reynaldo Alfredo R. Hipolito, Sr. (1933–2010), Filipino slapstick comedian and actor known as Palito
- Verônica Hipólito (born 1996), Brazilian para-athletics sprinter
