= Ippolita =

Ippolita is a feminine given name related to Hippolyte. It may refer to:

- Ippolita d'Este (1620–1656), Italian noblewoman
- Ippolita Gonzaga (1503–1570), Italian noblewoman and nun
- Ippolita Ludovisi (1663–1733), Italian Princess of Piombino
- Ippolita Rostagno (born 1963), Italian-American jewelry maker
- Ippolita Maria Sforza (1445/6–1488), Italian noblewoman
- Ippolita Maria Sforza (1493–1501), Italian noblewoman
- Ippolita Trivulzio (1600–1638), Italian Princess of Monaco by marriage
