= Lito Mayo =

Filipino artist (1954–1983)

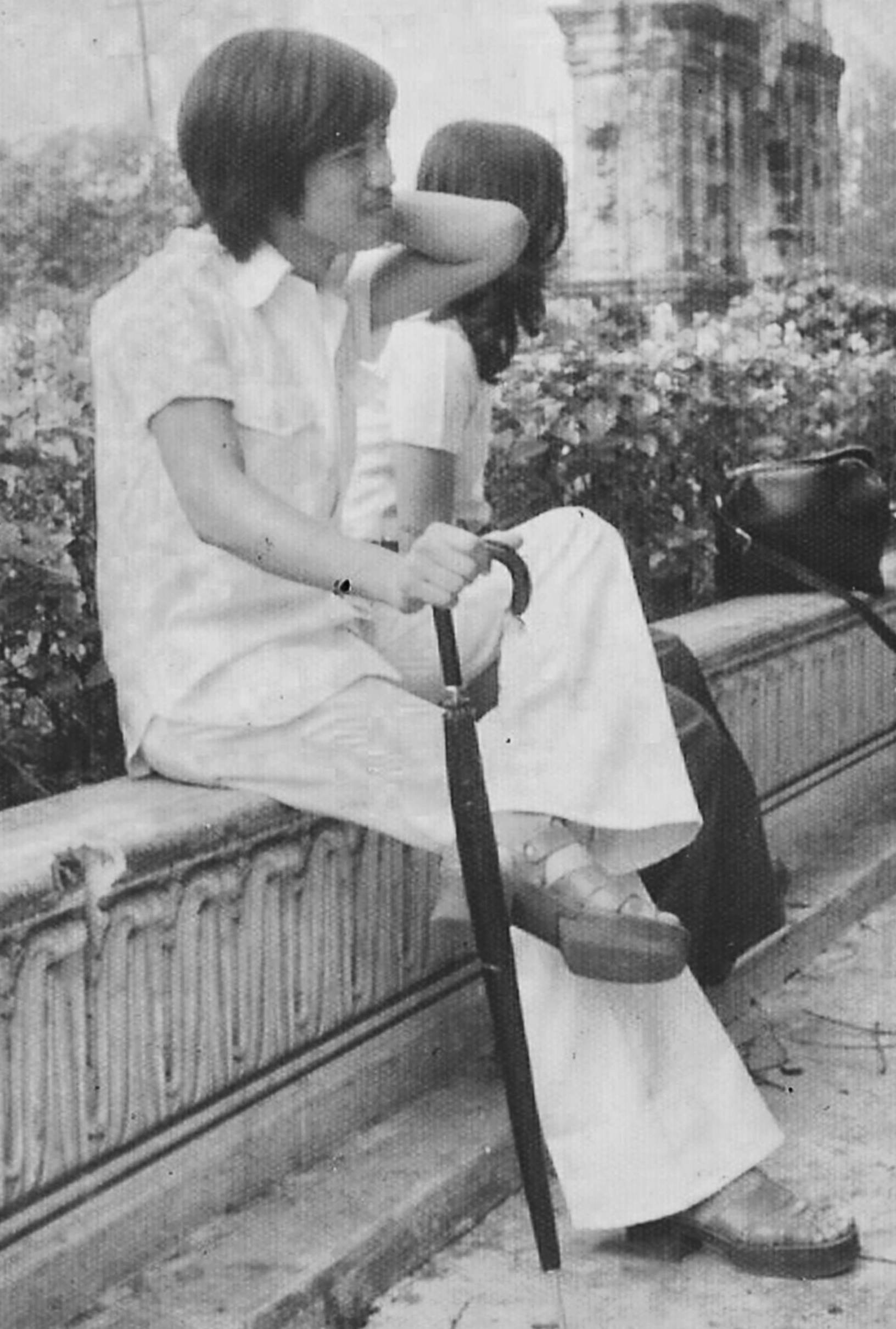
- Lito Mayo as an art student at the University of Santo Tomas in Manila (1973)
- Born: Manolito Tolentino Mayo; December 17, 1954; Lipa City, Batangas, Philippines
- Died: May 4, 1983 (aged 28); Manila, Philippines
- Education: University of Santo Tomas College of Fine Arts and Architecture
- Known for: Visual arts; graphic art; printmaking
- Movement: Filipino Modernism; Surrealism; protest art
- Spouse: Irma Hermano (Cachela) (m. 1971)
- Children: 2
- Awards: First Prize: Graphic Arts award from the Art Association of the Philippines (1976); First Runner-up: Grand Art Competition in Manila sponsored by the Art Association of the Philippines (1976)

Manolito "Lito" Tolentino Mayo (December 17, 1954 – May 4, 1983) was a Filipino graphic artist, printmaker, avantgarde poet, sculptor, and art professor. His prolific career was brief – it lasted only a decade, as he died at the age of 28. He was one of the active young artists who experimented, collaborated, and exhibited art works in the thriving hubs of modernist and contemporary galleries and art associations in the Ermita district of Manila. He was also credited by his peers and art writers as the "Original Punk" of Philippine arts.

== Early life and education ==
Mayo was born on December 17, 1954, in Lipa City, Batangas, the eldest son and second child of banker and entrepreneur Sebastian Mayo and teacher and homemaker Belen Tolentino Mayo. He was born into one of the oldest and historic clans of Lipa City; the Mayo clan of Lipa City has claimed and has documented their roots from Spanish, Chinese, and Irish-British ancestry. His father was an employee at the Philippine National Bank branch of Lipa City who had retired early to establish The Lipa Trading Company, a multifaceted family business that included insurance, financing, real estate, agriculture, tax preparation and a Suzuki motorcycle dealership and tricycle shop.

He attended De La Salle Lipa, one of the local high schools that was established by the Lasallian Brothers, and graduated in 1971.

He received a BFA from the University of Santo Tomas (UST) in 1975. While at UST he received several art awards at the university: 1st Honorable Mention, Sculpture Contest (1973); 3rd Prize, Graphic Arts (1973); 3rd Honorable Mention, Graphic Arts Competition (1973); and Honorable Mention, Annual On-The-Spot Painting Contest (1974).

His years at university coincided with the martial law under Ferdinand Marcos, and Mayo helped the resistance by joining the anti-CAFA (Committee on Anti-Filipino Activities) movement and using the printing presses he had access to, to help disseminate information. He was also a member of the philanthropy-oriented Tau Gamma Phi fraternity.

== Art and career ==
Mayo's early work was heavily inspired by Cubism, wood print blocks, and sculptures. He established himself in graphic arts, with print plate etching as his major technique. Intaglio, xerographics, and silkscreen processes were also incorporated into his early works. Business Day writer Angel G. De Jesus wrote that Mayo was "a surrealistic expressionist with a satiric sense of humor".

He was president of the Philippine Association of Printmakers from 1975 to 1976, and was a member of the board of directors of the Art Association of the Philippines in 1977.

From 1981 to 1983 he taught Visual Arts and Design at the Philippine Women's University School of Fine Arts and Design.

Mayo's subjects and compositions usually embodied magical themes, amulets, animal people, and subconscious wanderings. In his work Pula Puti, he depicted a cockfight scene with two roosters with muscular human forms readying for a gladiatorial fight. His 1981 self portrait, a work in etching, has many incantations, mystical orations, and ancient figures adorning his shroud and countenance.

Mayo was regarded as the progenitor of punk culture and movement in the Philippines. He infused art and punk as a subculture and influenced many young artists and musicians to explore the subversion and excitement of the genre.

== Personal life ==
In 1971, at the age of 17, Mayo married Irma Hermano, the daughter of Philippine Air Force official Porfirio Hermano and Pacita Hermano who owned and operated D'Crowns Tailoring, which served the uniforms and flight suits need of the military student aviators and officers inside Fernando Air Base. The couple had two sons, Michaelangelo and Leonardo.

He died unexpectedly in 1983 at the age of 28.

== Awards and recognition ==
1975

- 2nd Prize (Mixed Media Category): Print Competition in Manila sponsored by Bancom, Eurasia Arts, and the Philippine Association of Printmakers

1976

- First Runner-up: Grand Art Competition in Manila sponsored by the Art Association of the Philippines
- First Prize: Graphic Arts award from the Art Association of the Philippines

1977

- Honorable Mention: Graphic Arts award from the Art Association of the Philippines

1978

- First Runner-up: Grand Art Competition in Manila sponsored by the Art Association of the Philippines
- First Runner-up: Graphic Arts award from the Art Association of the Philippines

In September 2018, when the well-respected printmaker and influential artist, Virgilio "Pandy" Aviado was awarded the Gawad Tanglaw ng Lahi, a prestigious "Filipino Cultural" award from Ateneo De Manila University, he dedicated the award to ten printmakers who were no longer living, included Mayo.

== Museum collections and posthumous exhibitions ==
Tirada: 50 Years of Philippine Printmaking 1968-2018 (05/19/2018- 07/15/2018). Cultural Center of the Philippines. Roxas Boulevard, Pasay City, 1003 Metro Manila

October 17–30, 2015: Hiraya Gallery. 35th Anniversary Exhibition, ArtistSpace, Ayala Museum

Ateneo Art Gallery

- Temptation, 6/10 (1974) – Etching – 32 cm x 27.5 cm (Gift from Emmanuel Torres)
- Untitled (1975) – Etching and aquatint – 20.5 cm x 20.5 cm (Gift from Mayo)

The Ateneo Art Gallery presents Print(Ed): The AAG Print Collection Revisited (July–September 2019). Selected works from Wilson L Sy Prints and Drawings Gallery collection, curated by Pandy Aviado

== Gallery of works ==
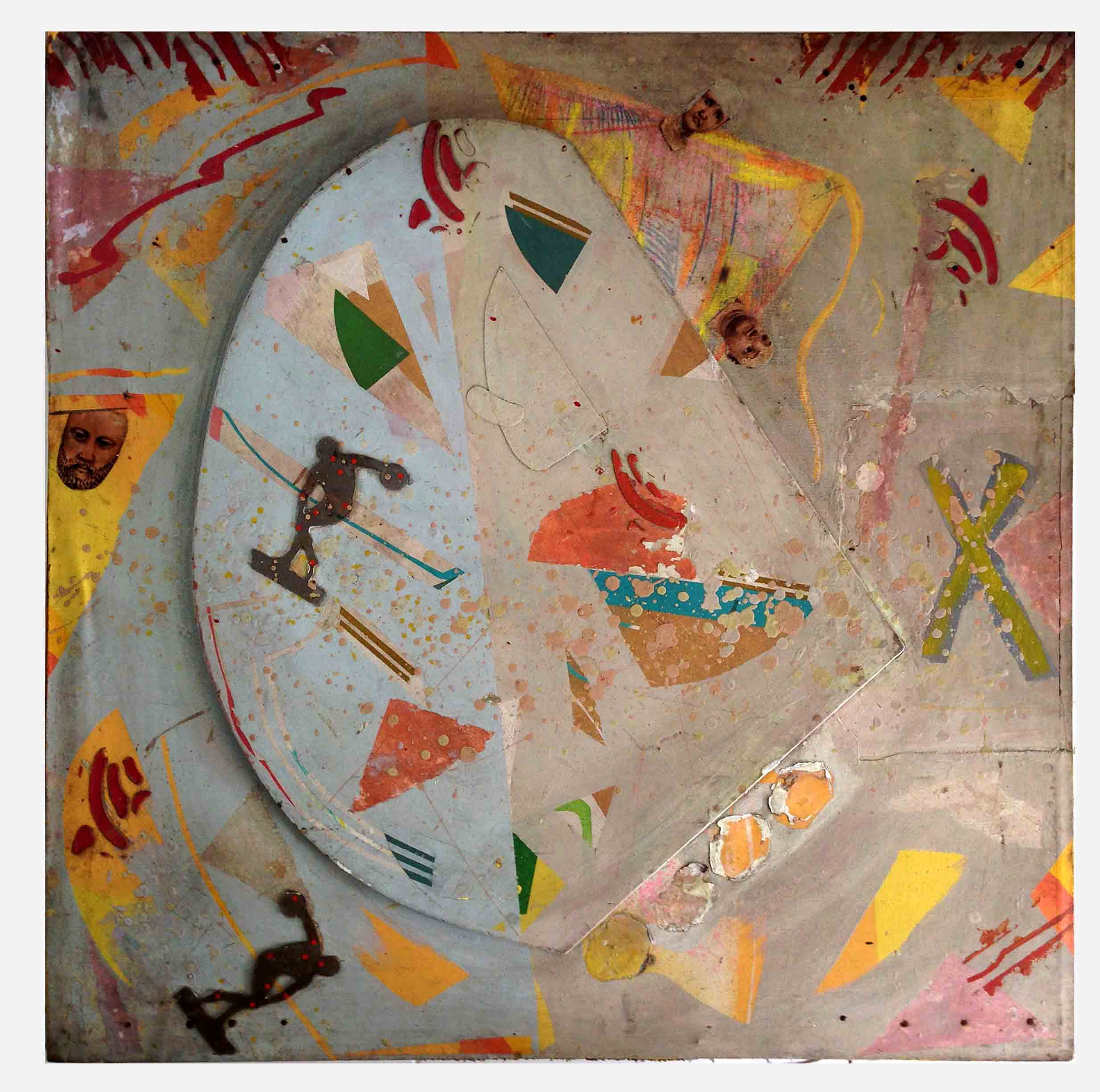
Gemini, 1982

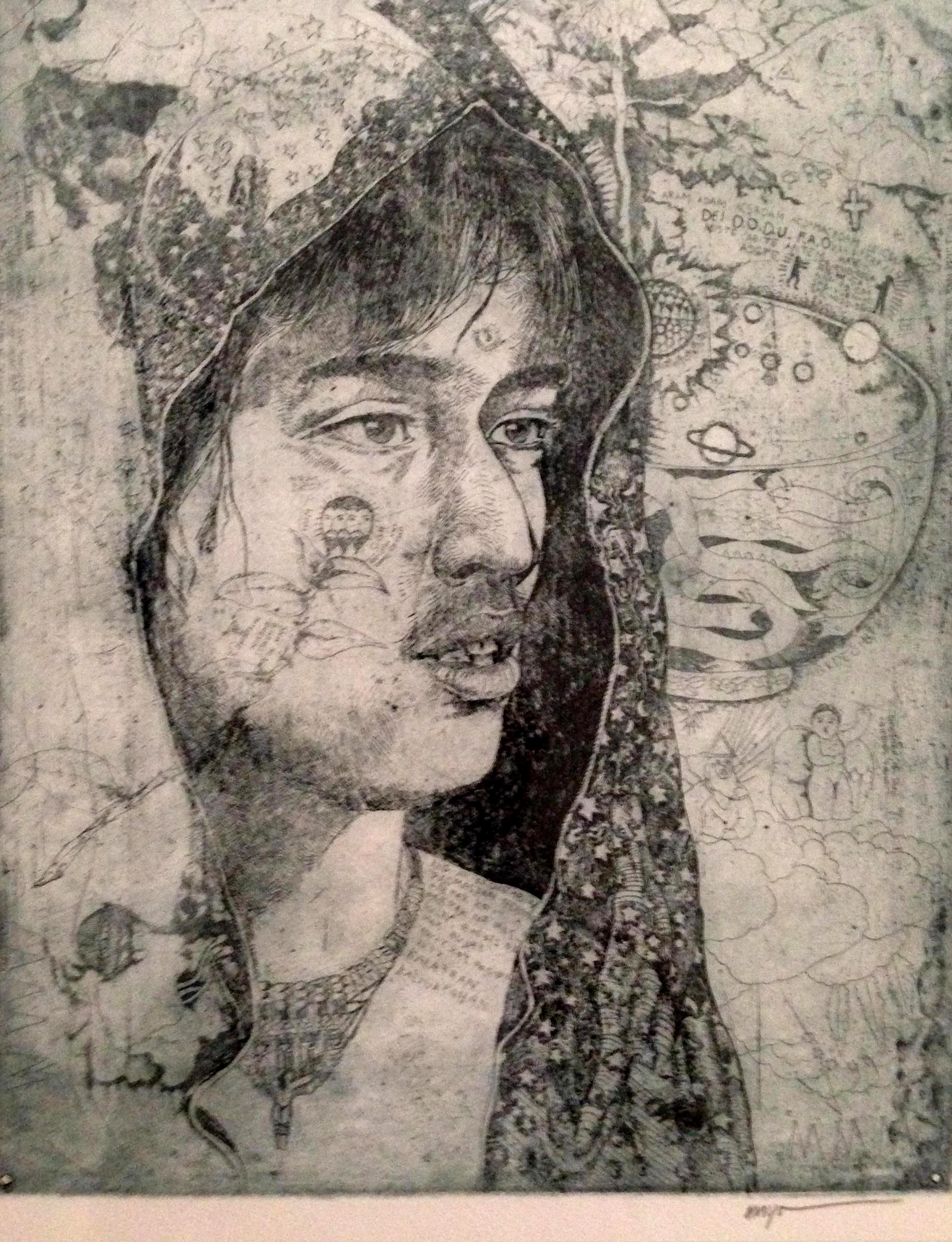
Self-Portrait of Lito Mayo, 1981

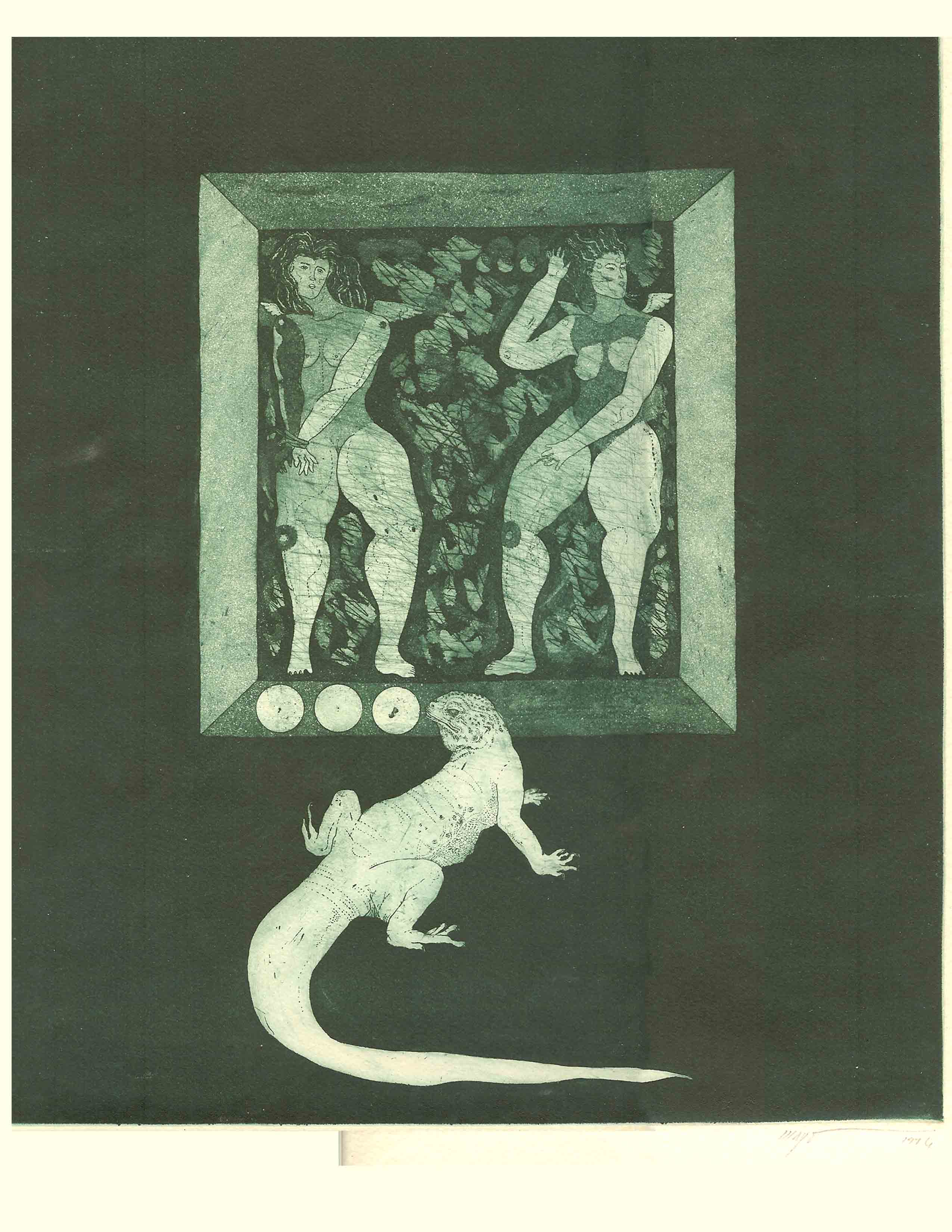
Temptation, 1976

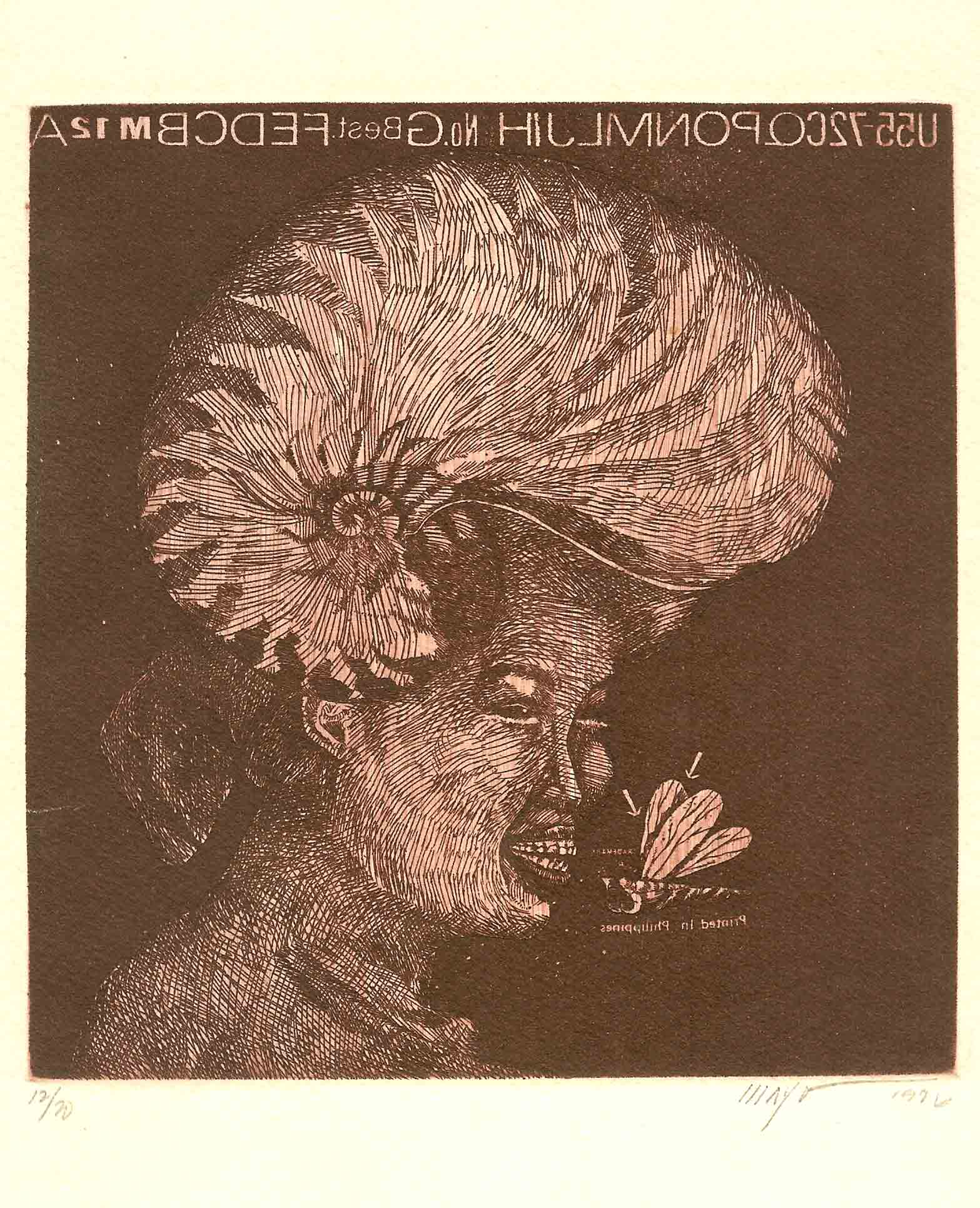
Mukha Ethnic (Ethnic Face), 1976

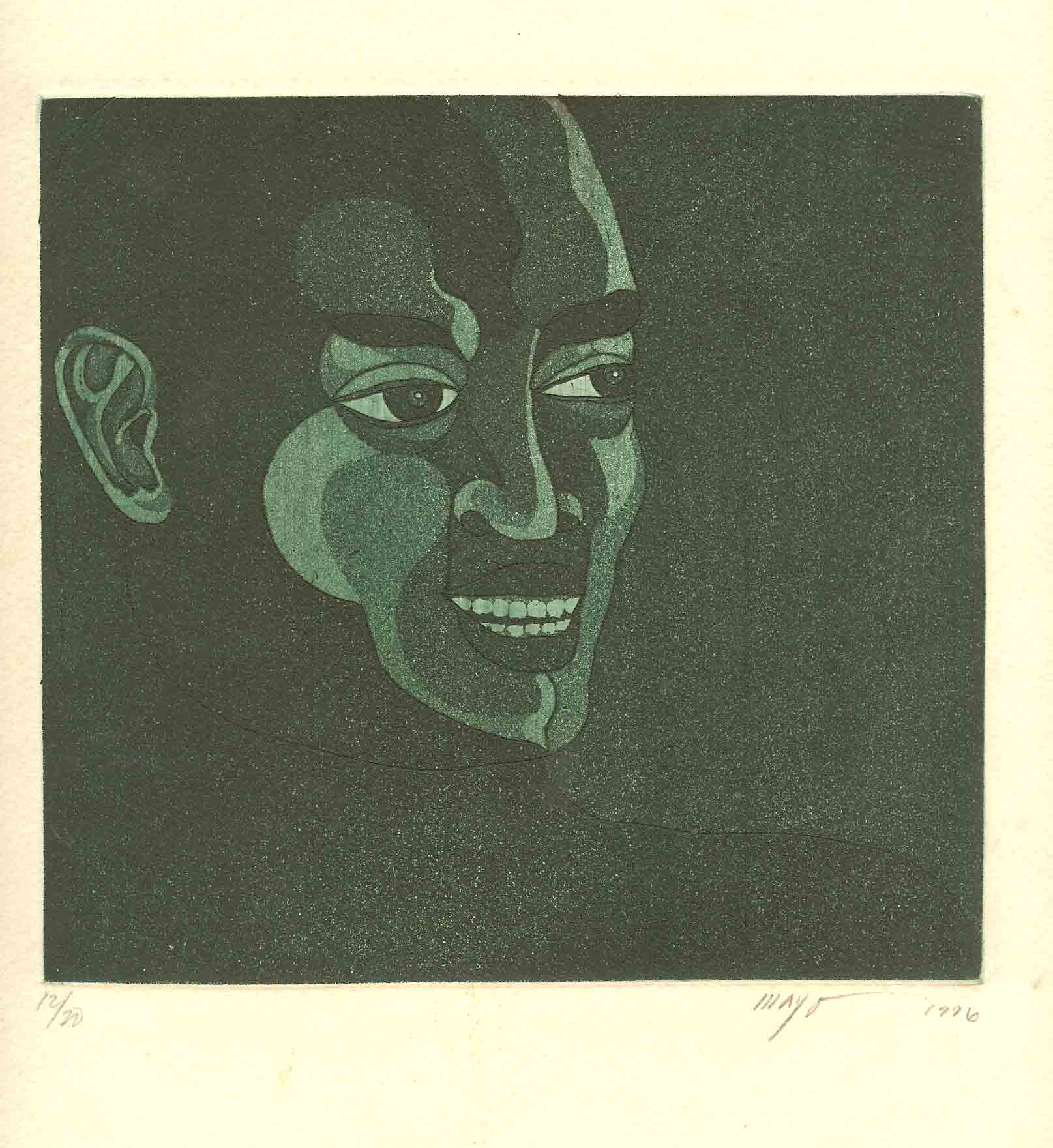
Mukha, 1976

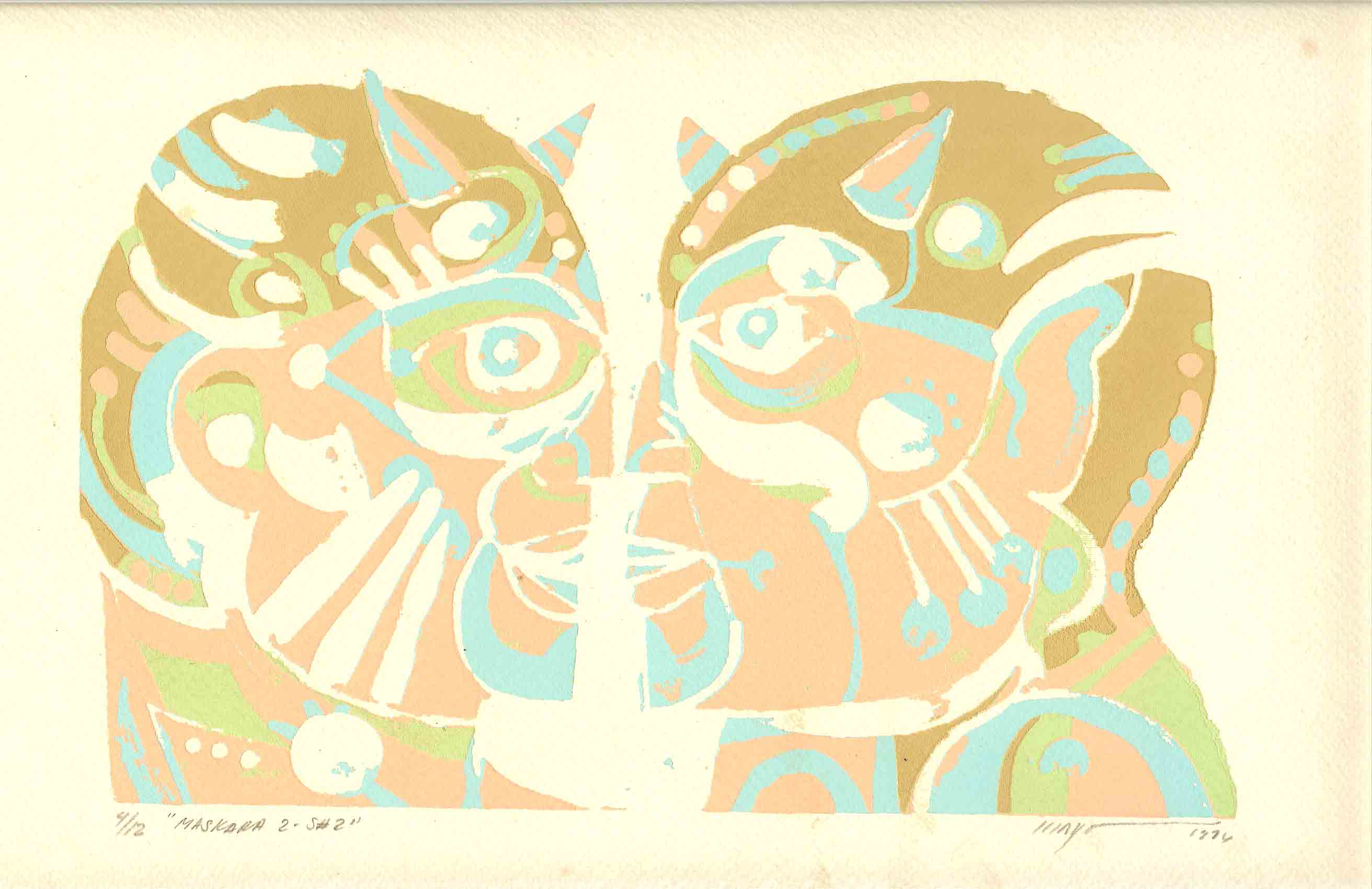
Maskara 2, 1976

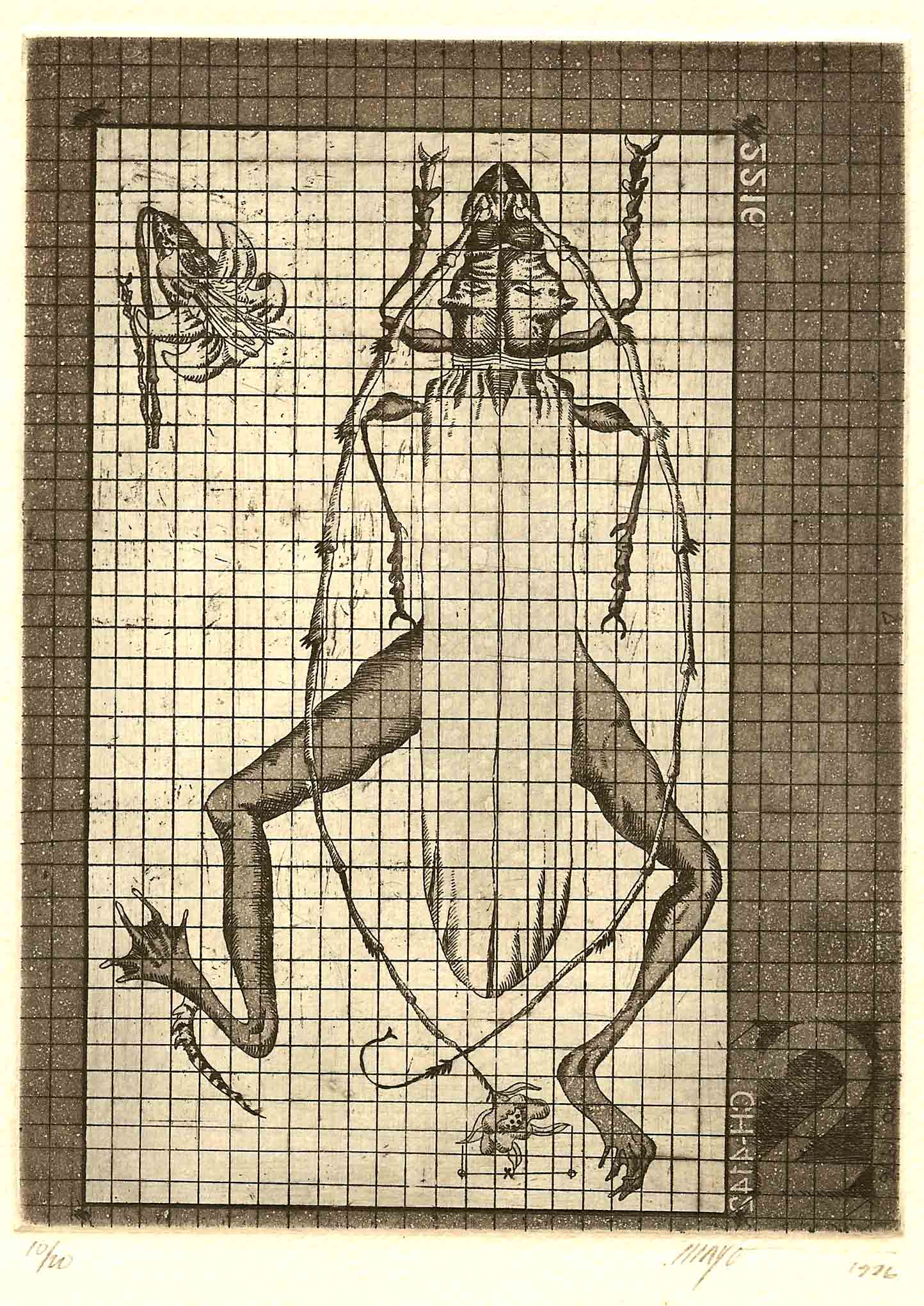
Insekto, 1976
