= Rostagno =

Rostagno is a surname. Notable people with the name include:

- Derrick Rostagno, a former professional tennis player from the United States
- Ippolita Rostagno, an Italian-American jewelry designer based in New York City
- Juan Rostagno, an Argentine sports shooter
- Victor Rostagno, an Uruguayan male artistic gymnast
