= Department of Transportation (Philippines) =

Highway transportation agency of the Philippine government

- Kagawaran ng Transportasyon

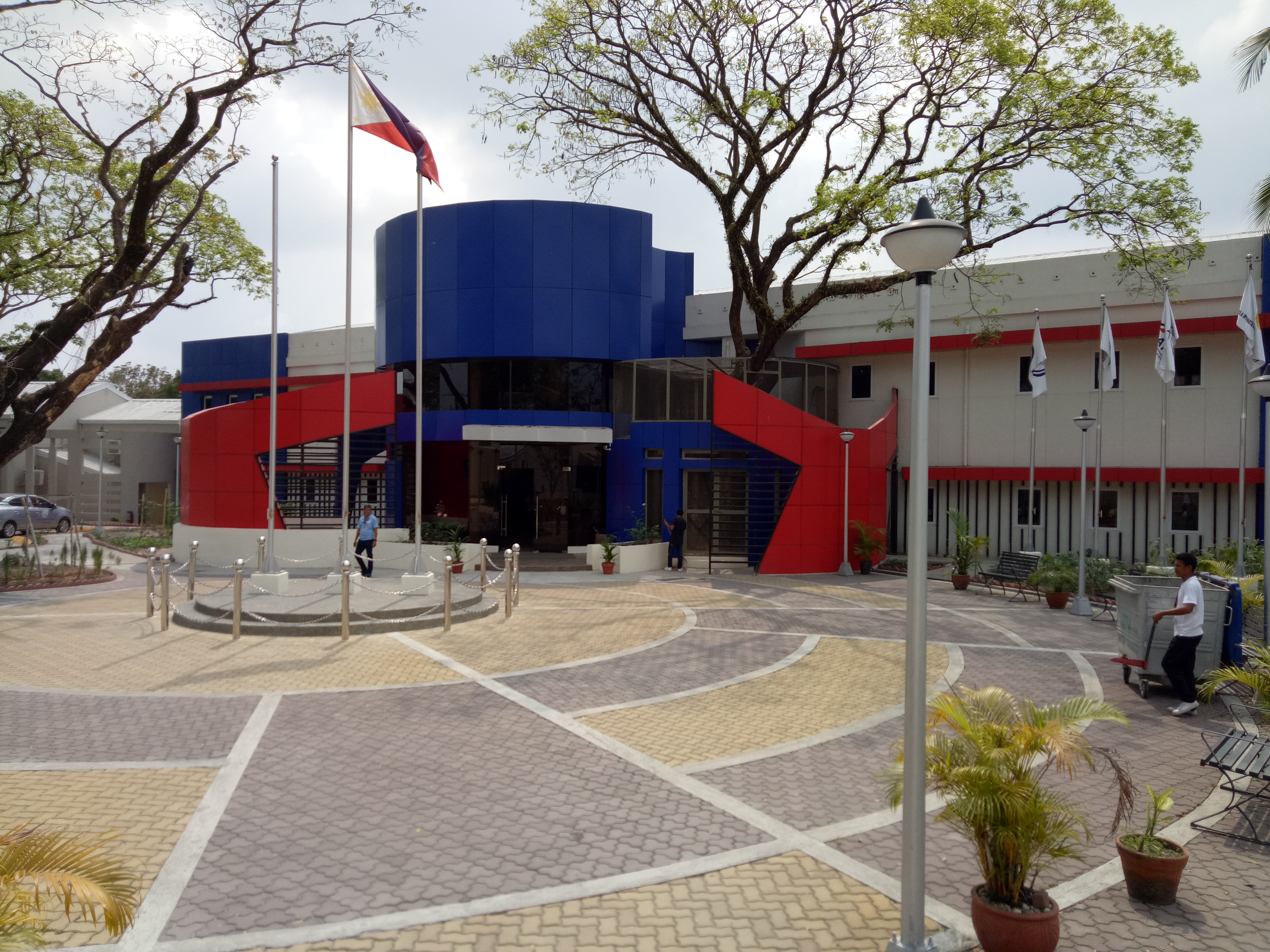
- Department of Transportation satellite office in Clark, Pampanga

Department overview
- Formed: January 23, 1899; 127 years ago July 28, 1979; 47 years ago (present form); June 9, 2016; 10 years ago (present name)
- Headquarters: Primex Tower, EDSA corner Connecticut Street, Barangay Greenhills, San Juan
- Employees: 4,511 (2024)
- Annual budget: ₱167.1 billion (2023) ▲
- Department executives: Giovanni Z. Lopez, Acting Secretary; Asec. Mon Ilagan, Spokesperson
- Website: www.dotr.gov.ph

The Department of Transportation (DOTr; Filipino: Kagawaran ng Transportasyon) is the executive department of the Philippine government responsible for the maintenance and expansion of viable, efficient, and dependable transportation systems as effective instruments for national recovery and economic progress. It is responsible for the country's land, air, and sea communications infrastructure.

Until June 30, 2016, the department was named Department of Transportation and Communications (DOTC; Filipino: Kagawarán ng Transportasyón at Komunikasyón). With Republic Act No. 10844 or "An Act Creating the Department of Information and Communications Technology", signed into law on May 20, 2016, during the administration of President Benigno Aquino III, the Information and Communications Technology Office was spun off the Department of Science and Technology (DOST) and merged with all operative units of the DOTC dealing with communications, to form the new Department of Information and Communications Technology.

== History ==
From 1899 to 1979, all transportation activities were integrated into the structure and activities of what is now the Department of Public Works and Highways.

=== Early history ===
On July 28, 1979, the Ministry of Transportation and Communications (MOTC), headed by Minister Jose P. Dans, Jr., was formally created pursuant to Executive Order No. 546. Under this Executive Order, the Ministry of Public Works, Transportation and Communications (MPWTC) was divided into two separate ministries: The Ministry of Transportation and Communications (MOTC) and the Ministry of Public Works and Highways (MPWH).

The MOTC became the primary policy, planning, programming, coordinating, implementing and administrative entity of the executive branch of the government in the promotion, development and regulation of a dependable and coordinated network of transportation and communication systems.

The infrastructure projects undertaken during this period included:

- Light Rail Transit System
- Computer-Controlled Traffic Lights System
- Manila International Airport, renamed to Ninoy Aquino International Airport
- Central Post Offices in Makati, Caloocan, Quezon City, and San Juan

It was also during this period that the motor vehicle registration and control was improved with the introduction of permanent vehicle license plates and the staggered registration system. A bus leasing program provided an additional 1,000 new buses in Metro Manila.

The operations of both the Philippine National Railways and the Metro Manila Transit Corporation were improved and expanded. At the same time, the Manila South Line of the PNR serving the Bicol Region was rehabilitated.

=== Post-1986 ===
On February 26, 1986, just after the 1986 EDSA Revolution, former Batangas assemblyman Hernando Perez was appointed Minister of Transportation and Communication by President Corazon C. Aquino.

In March 1987, technocrat Rainerio O. Reyes, was appointed Minister of MOTC. Immediately after, the MOTC was reorganized pursuant to Executive Order Nos. 125, and 125-A. With these Executive Orders, the MOTC was made into a department, under the Executive branch of the Government. Under Secretary Reyes, the quasi-judicial functions of the department were transferred to the Land Transportation Franchising and Regulatory Board, which was created through Executive Order No. 202.

=== Under Fidel V. Ramos ===
Jesus B. Garcia was appointed Secretary of the DOTC by President Fidel V. Ramos. Under Garcia, new entrants were allowed in the landline and cellular phone services, and dilapidated taxi cabs were also phased out in favor of brand new and late model units.

In early 1995, Senator Ernesto Maceda ranked the DOTC first in his "Flagship Centers of Corruption and Inefficiency" scorecard for 1994 out of all the government agencies, citing its alleged irregular transactions for projects related to telecommunication. Maceda previously ranked it second for the year 1993.

=== Present ===
On June 9, 2016, the foundation of the Department of Information and Communications Technology caused the DOTC to become simply the Department of Transportation (DOTr) as the DICT transferred the DOTC's communications agencies to it.

In July 2017, the Agency began transferring its main operations from its longtime headquarters at Columbia Tower in Mandaluyong, Metro Manila to Clark Freeport and Special Economic Zone in Mabalacat, Pampanga. However, as of 2022, the move was planned to be reversed as a result of a survey conducted among DOTr employees. The department still owns office spaces at the Columbia Tower, while the Office of the Secretary is currently located in the head office of the Civil Aviation Authority of the Philippines in Pasay.

During the presidency of Rodrigo Duterte, DOTr pursued numerous transportation projects as part of the Build! Build! Build! infrastructure program of the government, with ₱3.6 trillion worth of public infrastructure projects being rolled out from 2018 to 2022. The program was later superseded by the Build Better More under the presidency of Duterte's successor, Bongbong Marcos.

== Ongoing projects ==
=== Railways ===
==== Metro Manila Subway ====
The Metro Manila Subway, originally named Mega Manila Subway, is an approved underground rapid transit line to be built initially in Metro Manila in the Philippines.

The subway project was fast-tracked with the announcement on February 5, 2021, that 25 tunnel boring machines will be used for the subway's construction. Planned partial operations of the subway was revised to sometime between December 2021 and February 2022.

On April 27, 2021, the Department of Transportation announced that the underground works for the subway will start in the 4th quarter of 2021.

==== North-South Commuter Railway ====
The North–South Commuter Railway is an under-construction commuter rail from New Clark City in Capas, Tarlac to Calamba, Laguna. The North Line will have a length of 106-kilometer, from Tutuban in Manila to New Clark City, and is expected to be completed by 2027. The South Line will be reconstructed as an electrified standard-gauge full double-track line.

Pre-construction work such as clearing of the right of way had been started in January 2018. Construction commenced in February 2019.

== Organizational structure ==
The department is headed by the Secretary of Transportation, with the following nine undersecretaries and ten assistant secretaries

- Undersecretary/Chief of Staff, Office of the Secretary
- Undersecretary for Administration and Finance
- Undersecretary for Aviation and Airports
- Undersecretary for Legal Affairs
- Undersecretary for Maritime
- Undersecretary for Planning and Project Development
- Undersecretary for Railways
- Undersecretary for Road Transport and Infrastructure
- Undersecretary/Head of Philippine Railways Institute
- Assistant Secretary for Planning and Project Development
- Assistant Secretary for Finance and Comptrollership
- Assistant Secretary for Road Transport and Infrastructure
- Assistant Secretary for Administration and Procurement
- Assistant Secretary for Aviation and Airports
- Assistant Secretary for Communications and Commuter Affairs
- Assistant Secretary for Internal Audit and Special Concerns
- Assistant Secretary for Maritime
- Assistant Secretary for Railways
- Assistant Secretary/Chief of Land Transportation Office

== Attached agencies ==
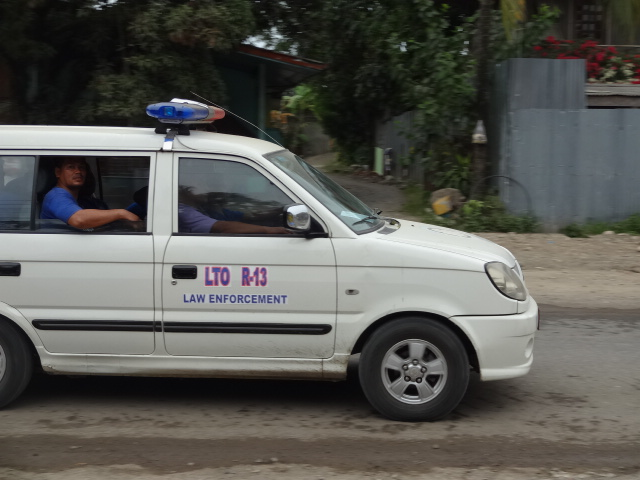
The Mitsubishi Adventure Patrol car of the Land Transportation Office in Butuan

=== Land (Road) ===
- Land Transportation Franchising and Regulatory Board (LTFRB)
- Land Transportation Office (LTO)
- Toll Regulatory Board (TRB)

=== Rail ===
- Light Rail Transit Authority (LRTA)
- Metro Rail Transit Corporation (MRTC) - not under the government, but supervised by the DOTr
- Philippine National Railways (PNR)
- Philippine Railways Institute (PRI)

=== Air ===
- Civil Aeronautics Board (CAB)
- Civil Aviation Authority of the Philippines (CAAP)
- Clark International Airport Corporation (CIAC)
- Davao International Airport Authority (DIAA)
- Mactan–Cebu International Airport Authority (MCIAA)
- Manila International Airport Authority (MIAA)

=== Sea ===
- Cebu Port Authority (CPA)
- Maritime Industry Authority (MARINA)
- Philippine Coast Guard (PCG)
- Philippine Merchant Marine Academy (PMMA)
- Philippine Ports Authority (PPA)

=== Miscellaneous ===
- Office for Transportation Security (OTS)
- Office of Transportation Cooperatives (OTC)
