= Hippolyte (name) =

Hippolyte or Hippolyta was the Amazonian queen with a magic girdle, in Greek mythology, and there are other mythological figures named Hippolyte. The name of the amazon, Ἱππολύτη, translates to 'having loosened horses'. The name of her son, Ἱππόλυτος (Hippolytus (son of Theseus)), is taken to be ironically ambiguous, also translating to 'being destroyed by horses', as he dies when his out-of-control chariot horses throw him off.

Hippolyte is the French form of the masculine (Hippolytus) and at the same time the German spelling of the feminine (Hippolyta).

Hippolyte (variously also Hippolite, Hippolytus, Hippolitus, Hipólito, Ippolit, Ipolit, Ippolito, Ipolito) or Hippolyta (Ippolita) is also used as a given name, and hence as a Caribbean surname.

== People with the given name ==
- Saint Hippolytus of Rome (3rd century)
- Hippolyte Piré (1778–1850), French general
- Hippolyte André Jean Baptiste Chélard (1789–1861), French composer
- Hippolyte Bayard (1801–1887), French photographer
- Hippolyte Monpou (1804–1841), French composer
- Hippolyte Léon Denizard Rivail (1804–1869), French educator, author, and founder of Spiritism
- Hippolyte Pixii (1808–1835), French instrument maker
- Hippolyte Lucas (1814–1899), French entomologist
- Hippolyte Fizeau (1819–1896), French physicist
- Hippolyte Taine (1828–1893), French critic and historian
- Hippolyte Fontaine (1833–1910), French electrical engineer
- Hippolyte Blanc (1844–1917), Scottish architect
- Count Hippolyte d'Ursel (1850–1937), Belgian politician and historian
- Hippolyte Aucouturier (1876–1944), French cyclist
- Ipolite Khvichia (1910-1985), Georgian actor
- Hippolyte Girardot (1955-), French actor

== Fictional characters ==
- Hippolyta (Shakespeare), a character in Shakespeare's A Midsummer Night's Dream
- Ippolit Terentyev, character in Dostoevsky's The Idiot
- Ippolit Kuragin, character in Tolstoy's War and Peace
- Ippolit Matveyevich Vorobyaninov, character in Ilf and Petrov's satire The Twelve Chairs
- Hippolyta (DC Comics), a superhero queen in the DC Comics universe
- Hippolyta (Marvel Comics), an Amazon warrior in the Marvel Comics universe
- Hippolyta Trevor, a DC Comics character, also known as Fury
- Hippolyta Freeman, a character from the 2020 television series Lovecraft Country

== People with the surname ==
- Saint Lucia
  - Emma Hippolyte, Saint Lucian politician
  - Kendel Hippolyte (born 1952), Saint Lucian poet and playwright
  - Myles Hippolyte (born 1994), Saint-Lucian/Grenadian-English footballer
- Surinam
  - Ivan Hippolyte (born 1964), Surinamese-Dutch kickboxer
- Haiti
  - Florvil Hyppolite (1828–1896), Haitian president
  - Hector Hyppolite (1894–1948), Haitian painter
- France
  - Jean Hyppolite (1907–1968), French philosopher
- United States of America
  - Ruben Hyppolite II (born 2001), American football player

== See also ==
- Hipólito, a list of people with the given name or surname Hipólito, Hipolito or Hypólito
