= Ziziphus talanai =

Conservation status
- Least Concern (IUCN 3.1)

Scientific classification
- Kingdom: Plantae
- Clade: Tracheophytes
- Clade: Angiosperms
- Clade: Eudicots
- Clade: Rosids
- Order: Rosales
- Family: Rhamnaceae
- Genus: Ziziphus
- Species: Z. talanai

Binomial name
- Ziziphus talanai (Blanco) Merr.

Synonyms
- Rhamnus talanai Blanco; Rhamnus zonulata Blanco; Ziziphus arborea Merr.; Ziziphus zonulata (Blanco) Blanco

Species of tree

Ziziphus talanai (also known as Ziziphus talanae), the balakat, aligamen, or talanai, is a species of tree in the family Rhamnaceae.

== Distribution ==
Ziziphus talanai is endemic to Luzon and Visayas, in the Philippines, The tree is found in the Philippinean Limestone Forest ecoregion.

== Uses ==
In Antique Province, its bark is used medicinally for diseases from ringworm to urinary tract infections. Studies have shown that the bark does have antimicrobial properties.

The city of Mabalacat in Pampanga Province was named after it in 1712, using the indigenous Negrito word mabalacat meaning "forest of balakat."
