= Dante Hipolito =

Filipino painter

Dante Hipolito or "The Smile Painter" is a hyper-realist Filipino painter and visual artist. He was born in San Andres, Manila in 1959. During the papal visit in the Philippines, Hipolito was commissioned by the Catholic Bishops' Conference of the Philippines to create a painting titled Salubong as a gift for the Pope.

== Education ==
- Araullo High School
- Philippine Women's University (Fine Arts)

== Career ==
During the mid-1980s, Hipolito worked at Kalaro Publishing as an illustrator for a children magazine. After he became a seaman in Singapore, he went back to work as an artist and worked at Adformatrix Agency and then FCB International. In 1993, Hipolito worked as an art director for a Saudi Arabian advertising firm and was an active member of the Pinta Pipino Art Group.

== Papal visit controversy ==
During the papal visit in the Philippines in early January 2015, Hipolito dedicated an artwork to Pope Francis titled Salubong, it was viewed at the ArtLeadoff 2015 show at Galeria de las Islas at the Silahis Center in Intramuros. The painting became controversial as Pope Francis refused to accept the gift. Critics stated that the artwork was satirical. The models used in the artwork were Philippine celebrities both in politics and the movie industry. Pope Francis declined the painting and said that it would be better if the artwork depicted "real ordinary people", such as victims of typhoon Yolanda, instead of political and celebrity figures. Hipolito claims that the painting was inspired by his faith, his fondness for the Pope, and that he respects people's opinions regarding the artwork.
