= Philippine Women's University – School of Fine Arts and Design =

Fine arts school in Manila, Philippines

Philippine Women's University - School of Fine Arts and Design
- Motto: Learning beyond classrooms
- Established: 1947
- Dean: Josephine Turalba
- Faculty: Approx. 20
- Students: Approx. 300
- Location: Manila, Philippines; 14°34′29″N 120°59′24″E
- Website: www.pwusfad.com

The Philippine Women's University – School of Fine Arts and Design (PWU-SFAD) is the academic institution of Fine Arts and Design of the Philippine Women's University. PWU-SFAD is located along one city block in the district of Malate in the City of Manila bounded by Taft Avenue and the streets of Malvar, Nakpil and Leon Guinto.

== Historical background ==
The teaching of music in the Philippine Women's University (PWU) began in 1925, few years after the founding of the university in year 1919. In 1939, the Department of Music was organized and continued operating until the outbreak of the war in 1941. From 1943 to 1944, the Philippine Conservatory of Music, founded by the late Felicing Tirona, existed as an affiliate school of the Philippine Women's University. Then it began enrollment to both men and women. When the Philippine Women's University re-opened after its rehabilitation in 1947, the School of Music was formally established under the deanship of its original founder. Then, having Music and Fine Arts under one department, known as the Philippine Women's University - College of Music and Fine Arts. It was the youngest among the colleges of the university, but it already achieved distinct accomplishment and contributes to artistic progress. Now it is officially known as The Philippine Women's University – School of Fine Arts and Design (PWU-SFAD).

=== Timeline ===
- 1947

College of Music and Fine Arts was opened, while in 1952, it became an educational affiliate of the Philippine Women's University. The first Fine Arts Students were Patty Birocel, Antera Mar, Lilia Trinidad, Elenita Sayoc, Fe Severino and Rosario Bitanga. Mrs. Araceli Limcaco-Dans was the Fine Arts director who taught for 13 years.

- 1960

The school started artists in the fields of paintings and graphic arts. The students were engaged in experimental art activities and gained popularity for the school and the artists themselves.

- 1967

Among the personalities in the world of art, the following occupied position in the College of Music and Fine Arts: Mariano Madarang who served a director.

- 1973

Mr. Manuel Rodriguez Sr. became head of the Graphic Arts Department. In 1977 of June, the College of Music and Fine Arts building burned down, and the college was transferred to the main building.

- 1978-1979

Mr. Julian Cea Napal became the director with Mr. Alfonso Miaga as OIC designated by Dr. Leticia De Guzman.

- 1978-1991

Mrs. Ludivina L. B. Abes was Associate Dean from 1979 to 1986 with Mr. Alfonso Miaga as OIC and Mrs. Purification torres as Administrative Officer. Mr. Jerry Elizalde Navarro was consultant professor but stayed only briefly. Mr. Virgilio Aviado became academic head of the College of Fine Arts and with Mrs. Purification Torres as Administrative Officer until 1989. Dr. Luhualti Trias was designated Administrative from 1989 to 1991.

- 1994-1998

Mrs. Lorna Alvarez-Salutal became the Officer in Charge of College of Fine Arts, under the new name Institute of Fine Arts and Design (IFAD).

- 1998

Mrs. Rosario Bitanga Peralta became the acting Dean. Her original appointment was by the PWU President Dr. Jose Conrado Benitez. After 2 years she became Dean.

- 2006

Mr. Reiner Suva was appointed as Assistant Dean together with Mrs. Rosario Bitanga Peralta as the Dean of Institute of Fine Arts and Design under the presidency of Dr. Amelou Benitez Reyes. In the same year, the Institute of Fine Arts and Design was changed into School of Fine Arts and Design in line with the thrust of the University President Dr. Amelou Benitez Reyes.

- 2007

Mrs. Rosario Bitanga Peralta became Dean Emeritus and Mr. Reiner E. Suva was then appointed as acting Dean of the School of Fine Arts and Design, and became Dean in the year 2007. His original appointment was by the PWU President Dr. Amelou Benitez Reyes.

- 2010

Arch. Ma. Bienvinida T. Candelaria took over as Officer-in-Charge during the term of CEO Alfredo Benitez Reyes.

=== Present ===
Ms. Josephine L. Turalba was appointed Dean of School of Fine Arts and Design on May 1, 2011, by the incumbent president of the university Dr. Francisco Benitez and Arch. Ma. Bienvenida T. Candelaria was in turn appointed associate director for the Program Development.

== Programs ==
- Bachelor of Fine Arts Major in Painting
- Bachelor of Fine Arts Major in Visual Communication
- Bachelor of Fine Arts Major in Industrial Design
- Bachelor of Science in Interior Design
- Bachelor of Fine Arts (ETEEAP)
- Master of Arts Major in Fine Arts & Design
