= Mabalacat =

Component city in Pampanga, Philippines

- Component city
- Mabalacat City
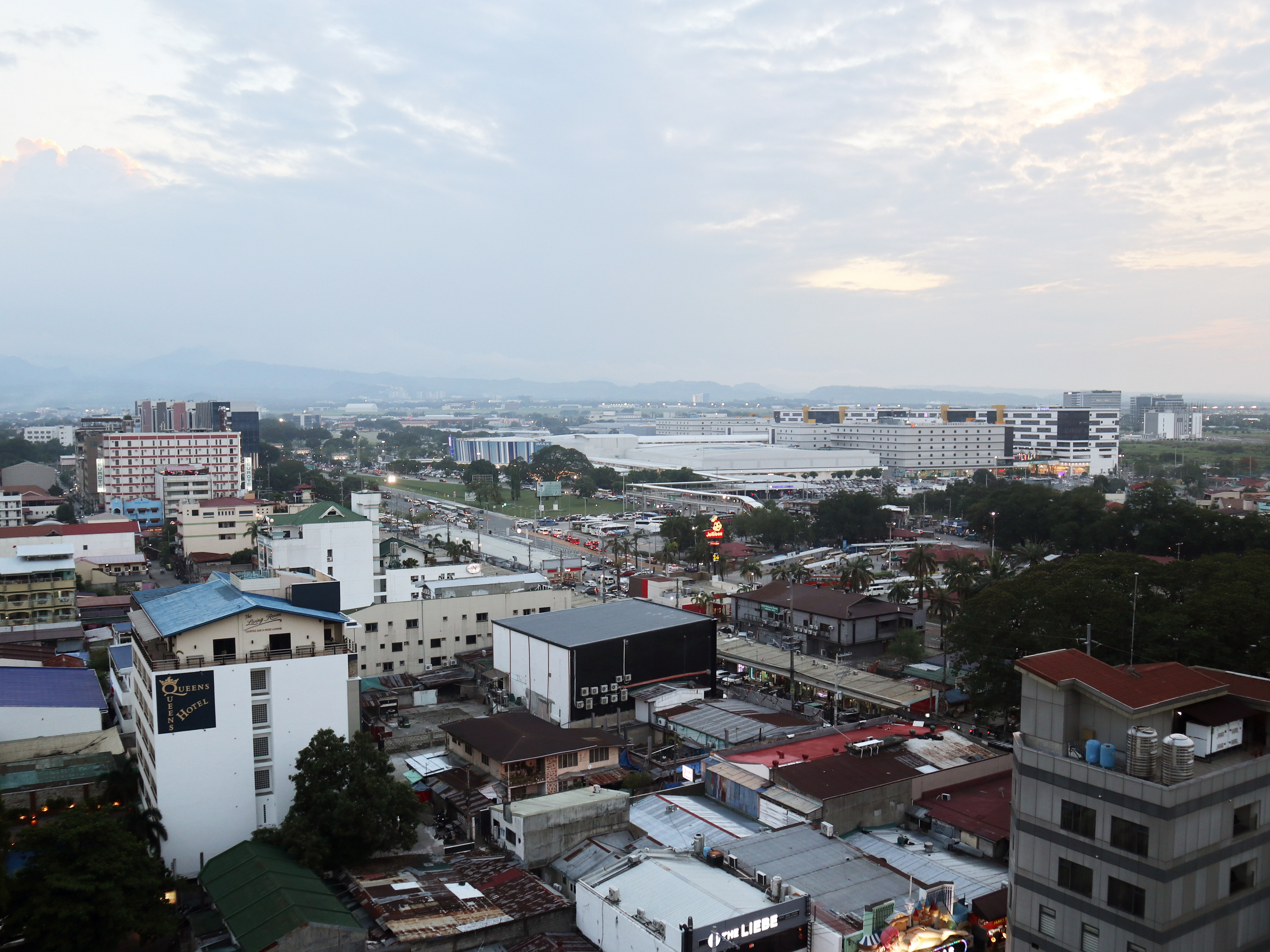
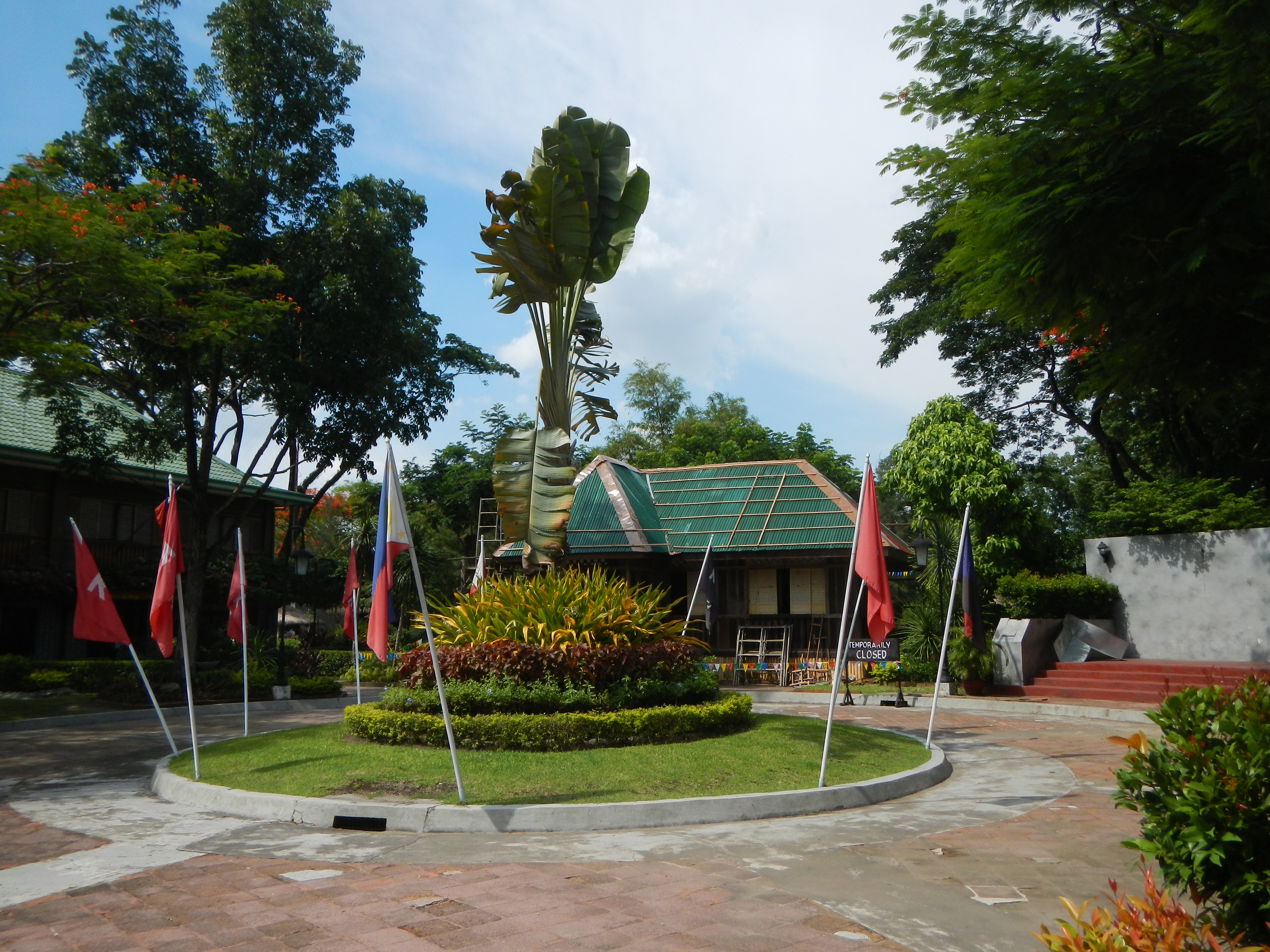
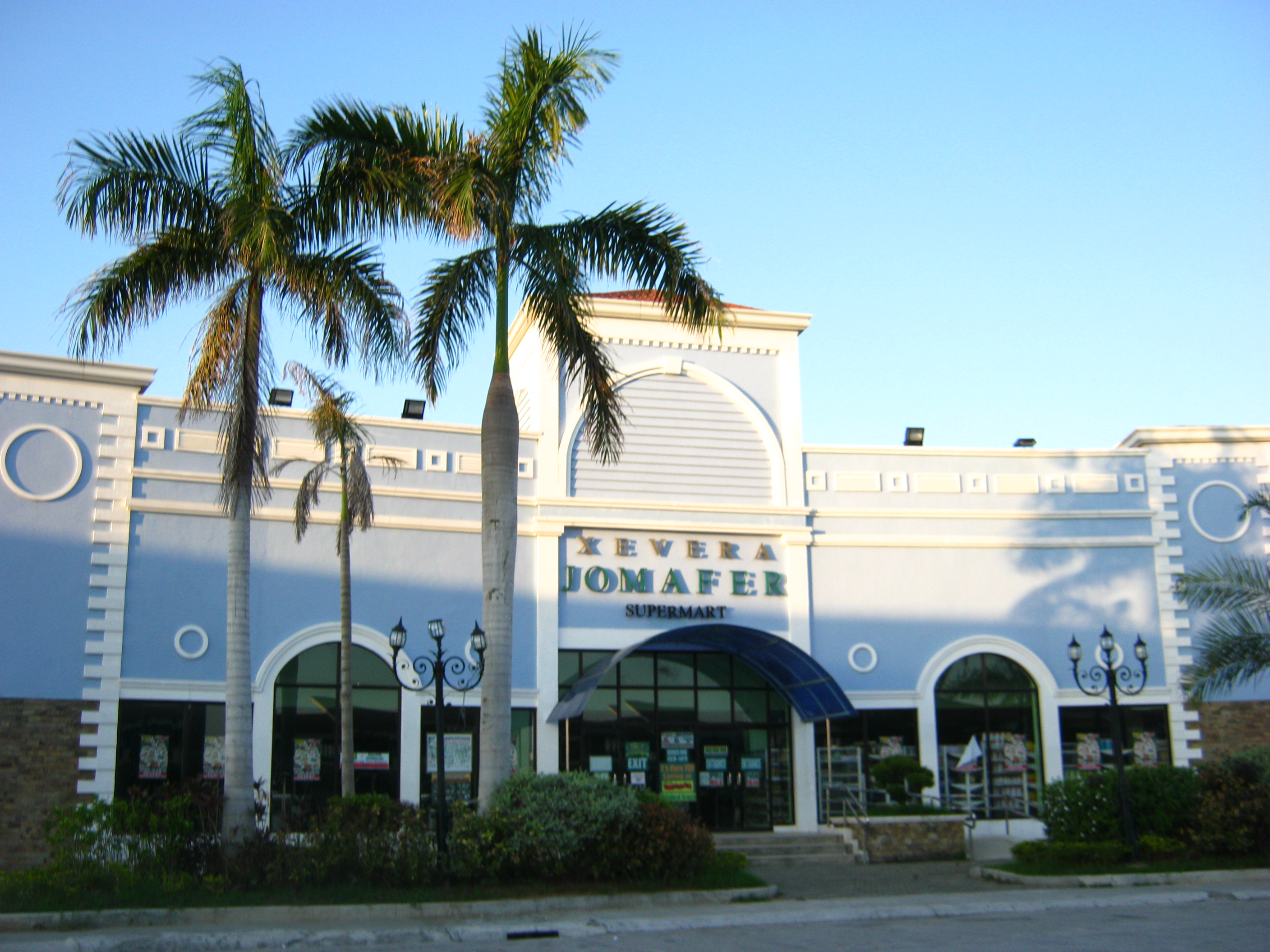
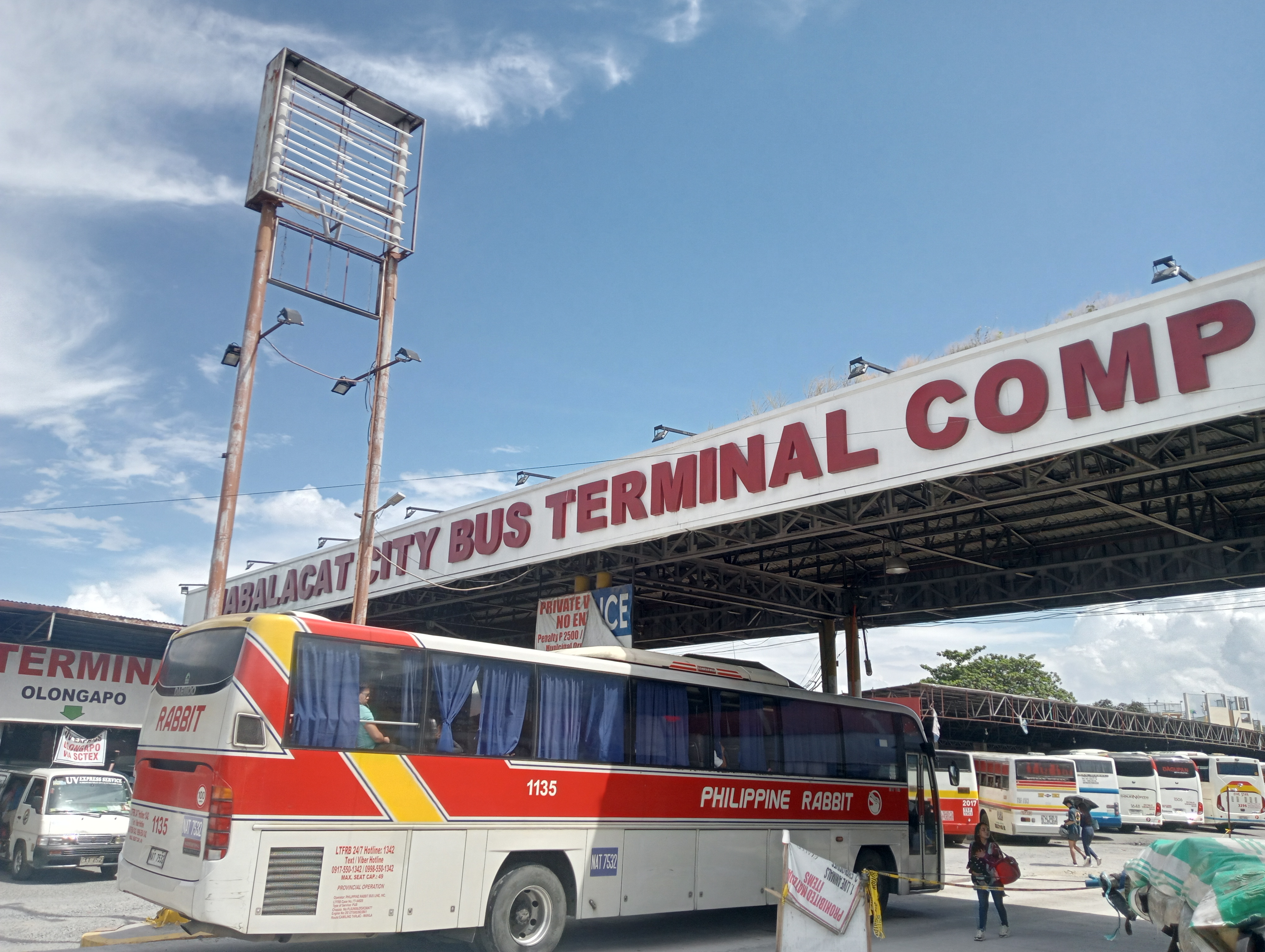
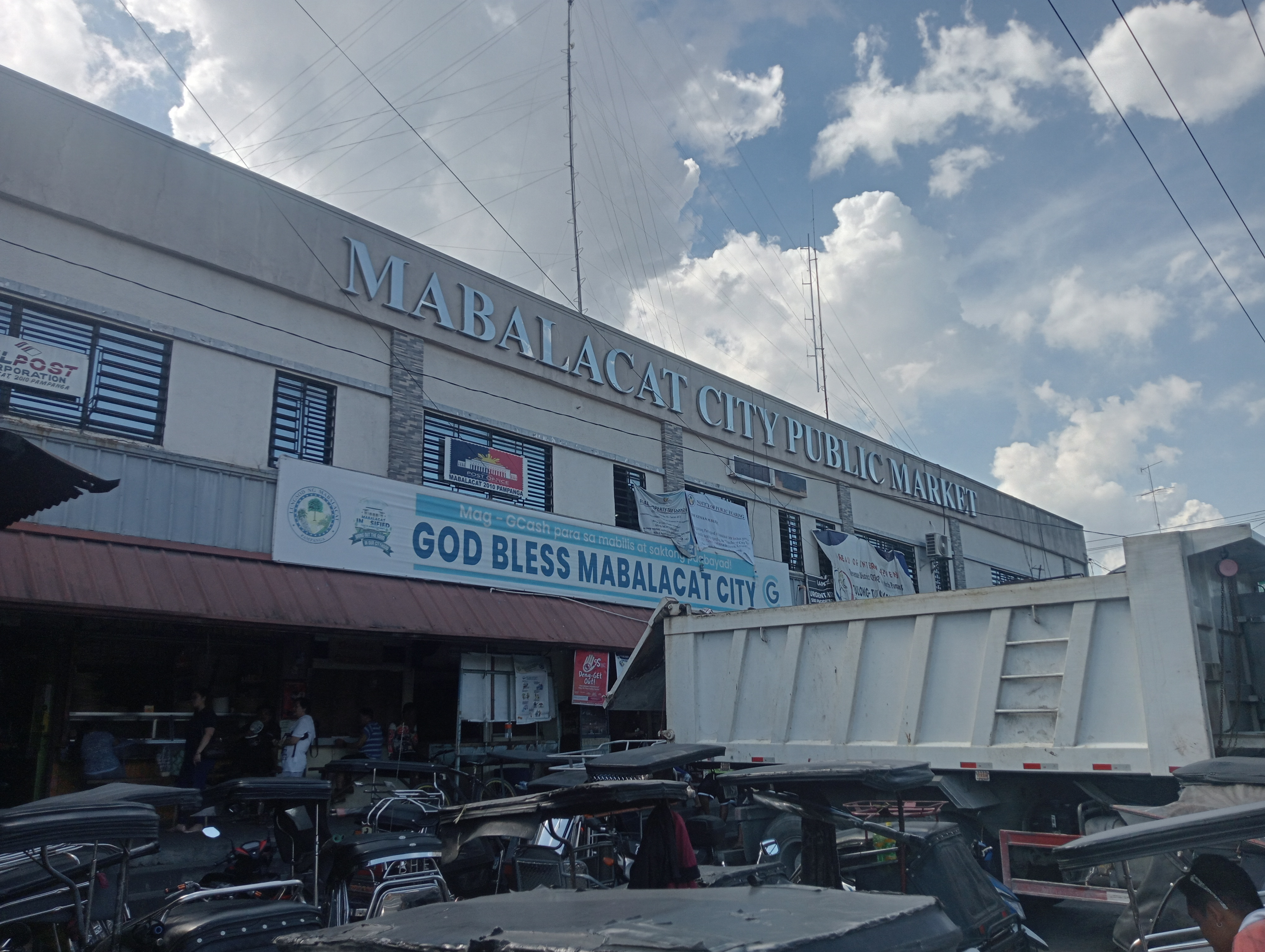
- From top, left to right: Clark Freeport Zone Skyline, Nayong Pilipino at the Clark Freeport Zone, Robinsons Mabalacat, Dau Bus Terminal, Mabalacat Public Market

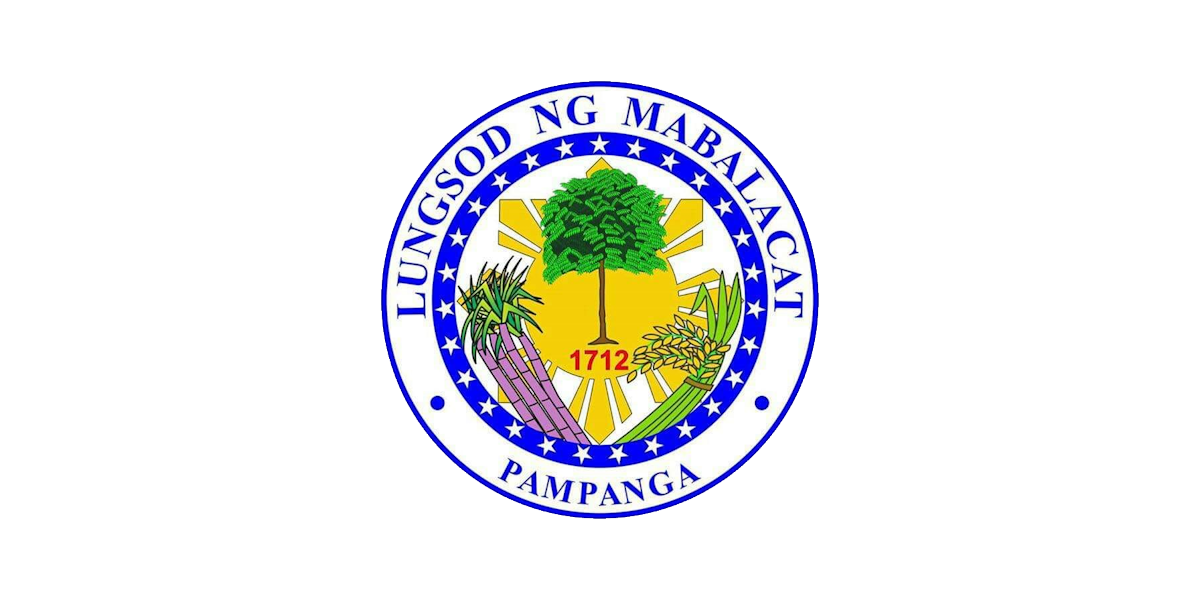
- Flag Seal
- Anthem: "Himno Ning Mabalacat" (Mabalacat Hymn)
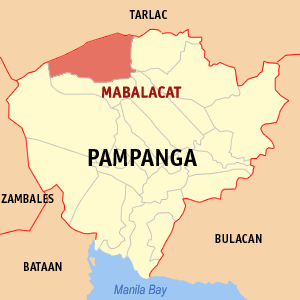
- Map of Pampanga with Mabalacat highlighted
- Interactive map of Mabalacat
- Location within the Philippines
- Coordinates: 15°13′N 120°35′E
- Country: Philippines
- Region: Central Luzon
- Province: Pampanga
- District: 1st district
- Founded: 1712
- Cityhood: July 21, 2012
- Barangays: 27 (see Barangays)

Government
  - Type: Sangguniang Panlungsod
  - Mayor: Gerald Guttrie P. Aquino
  - Vice Mayor: Marcos T. Castro Jr.
  - Representative: Carmelo Lazatin Jr.
  - Councilors: List: Miguel Ignacio M. Morales, Timothy Paul Llanos Dee, Victor Rene Ong, Eroll Jake C. Soliven, Benjamin D. Jocson, Marjorie Grace M. Sambo, Noelito B. Castro, Stephen Aurelio, Patricia Anne L. Acorda, Elizabeth Pineda
  - Electorate: 146,991 voters (2025)

Area
  - Total: 83.18 km^{2} (32.12 sq mi)
- Elevation: 166 m (545 ft)
- Highest elevation: 1,135 m (3,724 ft)
- Lowest elevation: 5 m (16 ft)

Population (2024 census)
  - Total: 306,594
  - Density: 3,686/km^{2} (9,546/sq mi)
  - Households: 74,707

Economy
  - Income class: 1st city income class
  - Poverty incidence: 6.75% (2023)
  - Revenue: ₱ 2,322 million (2024)
  - Assets: ₱ 2,828 million (2024)
  - Expenditure: ₱ 2,226 million (2024)
  - Liabilities: ₱ 1,141 million (2024)

Service provider
  - Electricity: Pampanga 2 Electric Cooperative (PELCO 2)
- Time zone: UTC+8 (PST)
- ZIP code: 2010, 2026 (Dau only), 2023 (portions under Clark Freeport and Special Economic Zone)
- PSGC: 035409000
- IDD : area code: +63 (0)45
- Native languages: Kapampangan; Tagalog
- Website: mabalacatcity.gov.ph

Mabalacat, officially Mabalacat City, (Note: Kapampangan: Lakanbalen/Ciudad ning Mabalacat; Filipino: Lungsod ng Mabalacat) is a component city in the province of Pampanga, Philippines. According to the 2024 census, it has a population of 306,594 people.

Mabalacat is in the urban core of Metro Clark, also known as Metro Angeles, an urban area in Pampanga. This area is considered the industrial and residential heartland of Central Luzon. Metro Clark is also identified as a regional center by the national government.

== Etymology ==
The name was derived from the indigenous Negrito word mabalacat meaning "place of balakat", a type of flowering buckthorn tree which was once abundant in the area.

== History ==
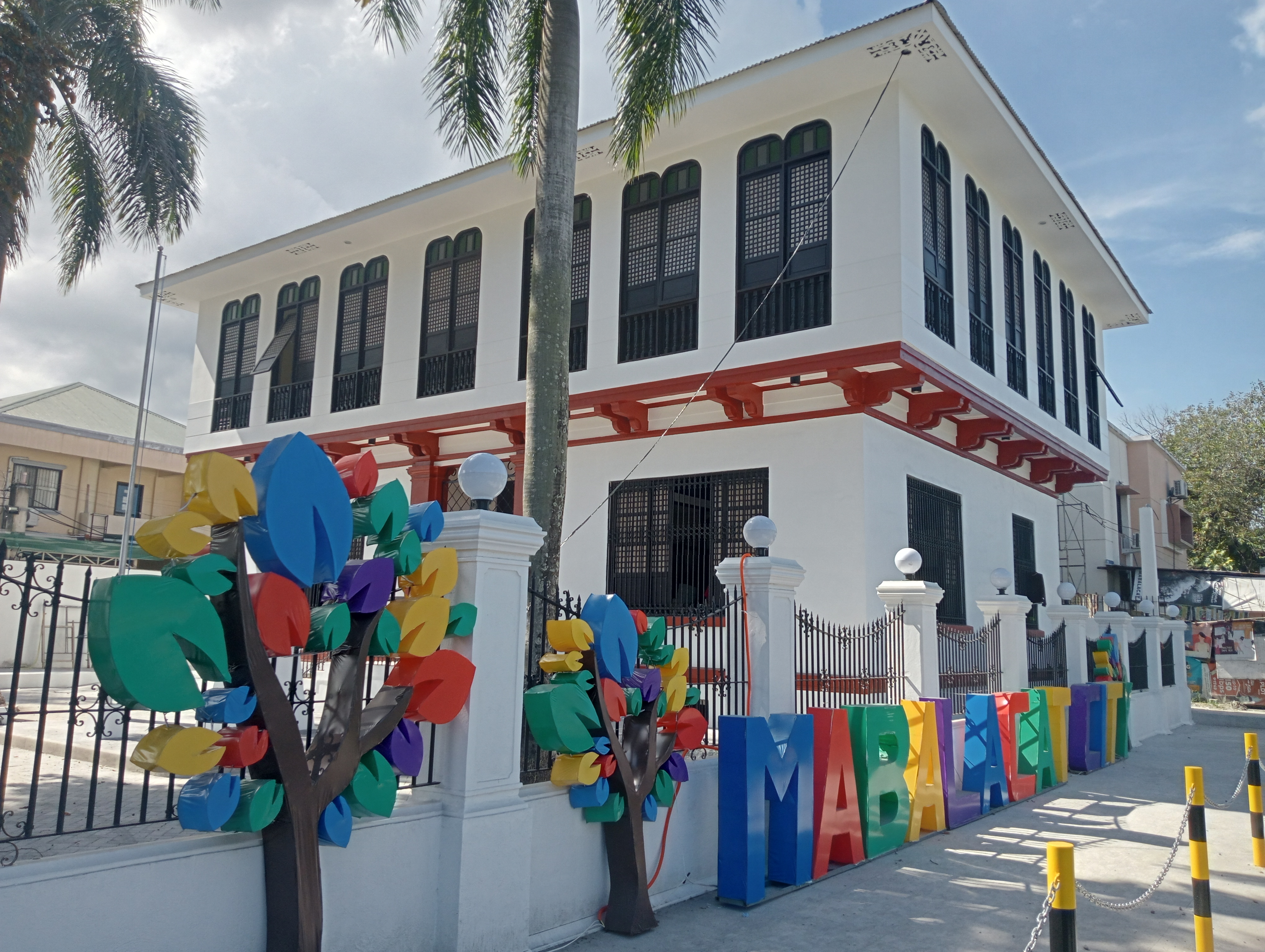
Old municipal hall

=== Establishment ===
Prior to 1712, Mabalacat was a barrio of Bambang (now Bamban, Tarlac). It became a separate town in 1792 and was named after the abundant balakat tree (Ziziphus talanai), a fourth-class timber tree with bark possessesint antimicrobial properties. Originally an Aeta settlement, the area was a virtual forest of the trees, giving its Kapampangan name the meaning "full of balacat." The city’s name is also reminiscent of the Maranao Mababaapalaqat, which means "short ladder".

In 1853, Mabalacat had a population of 2,611 in four barangays: Babangdapu, Duquit, Malabni, and Paglimbunan. By 1903, its population increased to 7,049 across 19 barangays of were Bical, Bundagul, Dapdap, Dau, Dolores, Iba, Mabiga, Mamatitang, Mangalit, Matas, Mawaque, Paralayunan, Poblacion, Quitangil (later renamed San Francisco), San Joaquin, Santa Ines, Santa Maria, Sapang Balen, and Sapang Biabas.

In 1858, the Comandancia Militar of Tarlac was established by Governor-General Fernando Norzagaray y Escudero due to lawlessness and depredation perpetrated by the Aetas (derogatorily called balugas). The Pampanga towns of Bamban, Capas, Concepcion, Victoria, Tarlac, Magalang, Porac, and Floridablanca were grouped in this Comandancia. Mabalacat was excluded from this alongside the Comandancia Político-Militar of Porac established in 1861.

=== American colonial era ===
In 1902, US President Theodore Roosevelt, signed an executive order creating Fort Stotsenburg in Barangay Sapang Bato in Angeles. This was all later expanded several times to include land within the territories of Mabalacat. An airfield was constructed from 1917 to 1919 and was named Clark Field. Stotsenburg and Clark Field were merged into what became Clark Air Base upon the signing of the US-Philippines Military Bases Agreement of 1947.

Aeta Kudiaro Laxamana and U.S. Air Force Captain Collin Kelly Jr. were two veterans honored in 2005 by Mabalacat officials for heroism during World War II.

=== Postwar era ===
The establishment of Clark Air Base, changes associated with modernization, and longstanding agricultural concerns represented overlapping aspects of Mabalacat's political and socioeconomic development in the years between the end of the World War II and the declaration of Martial Law on September 23, 1972.

==== Clark Air Base ====
In the immediate aftermath of the war, the US-Philippines Military Bases Agreement of 1947 was signed, creating Clark Air Base. The camp areas once designated under Fort Stotsenburg and Clark Field, including lands within the boundaries of Angeles and Mabalacat, were merged into the new base.

Its presence influenced surrounding communities through employment, commercial activity, and changes in land use. The nearby barrio of Dau experienced changes associated with modernization, including the growth of entertainment establishments, shops, and access to Western popular culture.

During the 1960s, Clark Air Base was an important United States military installation in the Philippines.

The military base became a subject of significant discussion regarding economic development, displacement, and the prominent impacts of American military activity on surrounding communities. Numerous studies about the impact of Clark on its neighboring communities have been made over the years. A 1982 study by Samuel P. Gaabucayan examined sociocultural changes associated with the American military presence among the Pinatubo Ayta communities. Eduardo C. Tadem's 2022 study of the Clark Special Economic Zone examined issues involving Indigenous Ayta and lowland communities, including disputes over ancestral lands and the administration of the zone. A 2026 article in “Synergy: The Journal of Contemporary Asian Studies” examined Clark Air Base through local memory, discussing the differing experiences of residents and American military interests.

==== Agriculture and land ownership concerns ====
Outside of the base area, Agriculture was an important part of Mabalacat's local economy during the postwar years; rice, sugarcane, and other crops cultivated in the area.

Land ownership patterns and the relationships between lowland farming communities and Indigenous people shaped the municipality's agricultural history. Historical accounts also indicate that massive agricultural lands were concentrated among prominent local families, including the Dizons, Tiglaos, and Ramoses.

==== Agrarian unrest ====
Agrarian unrest and peasant mobilization were significant features of Central Luzon's history. One key study providing information about rural conditions across Luzon was a 1973 study by Ben Kerkvliet examined agricultural conditions in Luzon before Martial Law, including land tenure and the economic circumstances of rural communities, although it does not establish the extent of unequal landownership or tenant indebtedness specifically in Mabalacat.

Conflicts involving tenant farmers and landowners, together with inequalities in landownership, contributed to rural political movements and peasant organizations in the Philippines.

==== New People's Army Operations ====
As part of the communist insurgency in the late 1960s, the New People's Army (NPA) was operating and taking part in Central Luzon. A historical account of the Philippine Army records an armed encounter between government troops and NPA members in Barrio Baluarte, near Mabalacat, in September 1969, followed by military operations against communist rebels in Central Luzon. This led to Communists standing for tenant farmers—rebel groups enforced shadow governments in rural barrios, implementing equal sharing of crops and defending the peasants from the hired private armies of the wealthy landowners by 1970.

As the Philippine Constabulary would aggressively sweep the rural barrios by day, the communists would show up to demand food and shelter. Yet, families who harbor rebels face consequences, including heavy interrogation, arrests, and forced evacuations. These developments took place amid wider political and agricultural concerns in the region.

==== Incidents of political violence ====
In 1971, Mabalacat experienced another episode of political violence when Mayor Ben Fernandez was assassinated approximately two months after taking office. Fred Halili subsequently served as mayor, according to a historical account of Pampanga's mayors published by SunStar Pampanga.

==== Conditions before Martial Law ====
In terms of the social conditions that preceded Ferdinand Marcos' September 1972 declaration of martial law through Proclamation No. 1081, academic studies describe agrarian conditions and sociocultural changes associated with the proximity of Clark Air Base, while military accounts allege that communist activity and political violence were taking place in Mabalacat as early as late 1969.

=== Martial law era ===
The beginning months of the 1970s had marked a period of turmoil and change in the Philippines, as well as in Mabalacat. During his bid to be the first Philippine president to be re-elected for a second term, Ferdinand Marcos launched an unprecedented number of foreign debt-funded public works projects. This caused the Philippine economy to take a sudden downwards turn known as the 1969 Philippine balance of payments crisis, which led to a period of economic difficulty and a significant rise of social unrest. Due to their proximity to the capital and the presence of Clark Air Base, events and conditions in Angeles and Mabalacat became flashpoints of social upheavals during the early 1970s. Clark and the other US Bases in the Philippines were a major issue for protesters, who saw them as a continuation of the US' colonial hegemony, and a way of dragging the Philippines into the cold war, since Clark had become a staging point for the increasingly unpopular Vietnam War.

With only a year left in his last constitutionally allowed term as president, Ferdinand Marcos placed the Philippines under Martial Law in September 1972 and thus retained the position for fourteen more years. This period in Philippine history is remembered for the Marcos administration's record of human rights abuses, particularly targeting political opponents, student activists, journalists, religious workers, farmers, and others who fought against the Marcos dictatorship.

==== The 1986 People Power revolution and the Bamban Barricade ====
Central Luzon played an important role during the People Power revolution because of its proximity to the Capital and its hosting of various Philippine and US Armed Force Bases. In a notable incident in Pampanga, 20,000 people blocked the Bamban Bridge which connects Bamban, Tarlac to Mabalacat, Pampanga on Feb. 25 to prevent loyalist forces from the Army's 5th Infantry Division in Tarlac from getting through to Manila, in an event which came to be known as "the Bamban Barricade."

=== Cityhood ===
The former municipality was officially upgraded to a city through Republic Act 10164 authored by Carmelo Lazatin Sr., where he was hailed as the Father of Mabalacat City, following a referendum on July 21, 2012, and became the third in Pampanga after Angeles City and San Fernando. It is home to roughly most of the Clark Freeport Zone, the rest in nearby Angeles, where the main gate is located. Clark International Airport, as well as the numerous hotels, casinos, golf courses, and resorts in Clark Freeport, are mostly situated in Mabalacat.

== Geography ==
Mabalacat has a land area of 83.18 square kilometers (32.12 sq mi). It is 93 kilometers (58 mi) from Manila, 10 kilometers (6.2 mi) from Angeles, and 27 kilometers (17 mi) from the provincial capital, San Fernando.

The soil is charcoal black and shiny, a sign of fertility, and is suitable for growing rice, sugarcane and other rootcrops. Like the neighbouring cities of Angeles and San Fernando and the towns/municipalities of Porac, Bacolor, Santa Rita, Mexico, Magalang and Arayat, this city rarely gets inundated by floods from heavy rains and typhoons because it is situated on an elevated, well-drained part of the Central Luzon plains considered "Upper Pampanga".

=== Barangays ===
Mabalacat is politically subdivided into 27 barangays. Each barangay consists of puroks and some have sitios.

- Atlu-Bola (San Isidro)
- Bical (San Roque)
- Bundagul (San Antonio)
- Cacutud (San Roque)
- Calumpang (San Jose Obrero)
- Camachiles (Inmaculada Concepcion)
- Dapdap (including Madapdap Resettlement: Santo Rosario)
- Dau (Center Business Downtown: San Isidro)
- Dolores (Virgen de Dolores)
- Duquit (San Jose)
- Lakandula (Virgen de Fatima)
- Mabiga (San Rafael Arkanghel)
- Macapagal Village (Inmaculada Concepcion)
- Mamatitang (San Roque)
- Mangalit (San Jose Obrero)
- Marcos Village (San Martin de Porres)
- Mawaque (Sta. Teresita)
- Paralayunan (San Antonio)
- Poblacion (Virgen de Gracia)
- San Francisco (San Francisco de Assisi)
- San Joaquin (San Joaquin y Sta. Ana)
- Santa Ines (Sta. Ines de Roma)
- Santa Maria (Sta. Maria Magdalena)
- Santo Rosario (Virgen Santo Rosario)
- Sapang Balen (San Carlos Borromeo)
- Sapang Biabas (including Mauaque Resettlement: San Vicente Ferrer)
- Tabun (San Isidro)

The largest barangay is Dau, which became a barrio in 1936 by virtue of Presidential Proclamation No. 1. It is now a business center whose commercial output runs parallel to that of downtown. A former terminus of the North Luzon Expressway, it is the most urban and most populous area in Mabalacat, home to roughly 23% of the city's population.

San Francisco, the second largest barangay, along with San Joaquin, Santa Ines, Poblacion, Calumpang and other barangays are categorized as urban in view of their proximity to the city proper. Sapang Balen, with a population of 166 persons, is the smallest barangay.

=== Climate ===
Climate data for Mabalacat 1997–2020
Month	Jan	Feb	Mar	Apr	May	Jun	Jul	Aug	Sep	Oct	Nov	Dec	Year
Record high °C (°F)	33.5 (92.3)	34.9 (94.8)	36.5 (97.7)	37.1 (98.8)	38.3 (100.9)	37.5 (99.5)	36.0 (96.8)	35.4 (95.7)	35.1 (95.2)	34.2 (93.6)	34.0 (93.2)	34.0 (93.2)	38.3 (100.9)
Mean daily maximum °C (°F)	30.0 (86.0)	30.9 (87.6)	32.5 (90.5)	34.0 (93.2)	33.3 (91.9)	31.9 (89.4)	30.8 (87.4)	30.3 (86.5)	30.8 (87.4)	31.2 (88.2)	31.1 (88.0)	30.4 (86.7)	31.4 (88.5)
Daily mean °C (°F)	25.5 (77.9)	26.0 (78.8)	27.5 (81.5)	28.9 (84.0)	28.8 (83.8)	28.0 (82.4)	27.3 (81.1)	27.0 (80.6)	27.2 (81.0)	27.3 (81.1)	27.0 (80.6)	26.3 (79.3)	27.2 (81.0)
Mean daily minimum °C (°F)	21.0 (69.8)	21.1 (70.0)	22.4 (72.3)	23.8 (74.8)	24.4 (75.9)	24.1 (75.4)	23.7 (74.7)	23.7 (74.7)	23.6 (74.5)	23.4 (74.1)	23.0 (73.4)	22.1 (71.8)	23.0 (73.4)
Record low °C (°F)	15.8 (60.4)	16.9 (62.4)	17.9 (64.2)	19.5 (67.1)	19.8 (67.6)	20.8 (69.4)	21.1 (70.0)	21.7 (71.1)	20.0 (68.0)	18.1 (64.6)	17.4 (63.3)	17.0 (62.6)	15.8 (60.4)
Average rainfall mm (inches)	13.6 (0.54)	16.3 (0.64)	52.5 (2.07)	60.6 (2.39)	196.1 (7.72)	254.1 (10.00)	514.6 (20.26)	695.1 (27.37)	305.5 (12.03)	201.6 (7.94)	97.0 (3.82)	47.5 (1.87)	2,454.5 (96.63)
Average rainy days (≥ 1.0 mm)	3	3	3	5	13	16	20	22	18	11	7	5	126
Average relative humidity (%)	70	68	66	65	74	80	84	86	84	78	75	73	75
Source: PAGASA

== Demographics ==
Population census of Mabalacat

Year	Pop.	±% p.a.
1903	7,049	—
1918	9,378	+1.92%
1939	20,560	+3.81%
1948	25,281	+2.32%
1960	31,752	+1.92%
1970	55,897	+5.81%
1975	69,874	+4.58%
1980	80,966	+2.99%

Year	Pop.	±% p.a.
1990	121,115	+4.11%
1995	129,990	+1.33%
2000	171,045	+6.06%
2007	203,307	+2.41%
2010	215,610	+2.16%
2015	250,799	+2.92%
2020	293,244	+3.35%
2024	306,594	+1.07%

Source: Philippine Statistics Authority

== Economy ==
Poverty incidence of Mabalacat (%)

Source: Philippine Statistics Authority

Mabalacat has an average annual income of ₱504,149,053.16 as of 2011 derived mostly from municipal license fees, land tax, Internal Revenue allotment, roads and bridges fund. In 1997, there were 2,447 business establishments registered in Mabalacat, consisting of 79 manufacturers mostly involved in sash factory, iron works, ceramics, bakery and 1,806 trading companies. The financial needs are served by eleven banks, mostly concentrated in Dau.

Public utilities include the Mabalacat Water System, Pampanga Electric Cooperative II (PELCO II), three telephone companies namely, Datelcom Corporation (DATELCOM), Smart Communications (SMART) and Digital Telecommunications Philippines, Incorporated (DIGITEL) and one cable television network (PRO-SAT) which runs solely for Mabalacat.

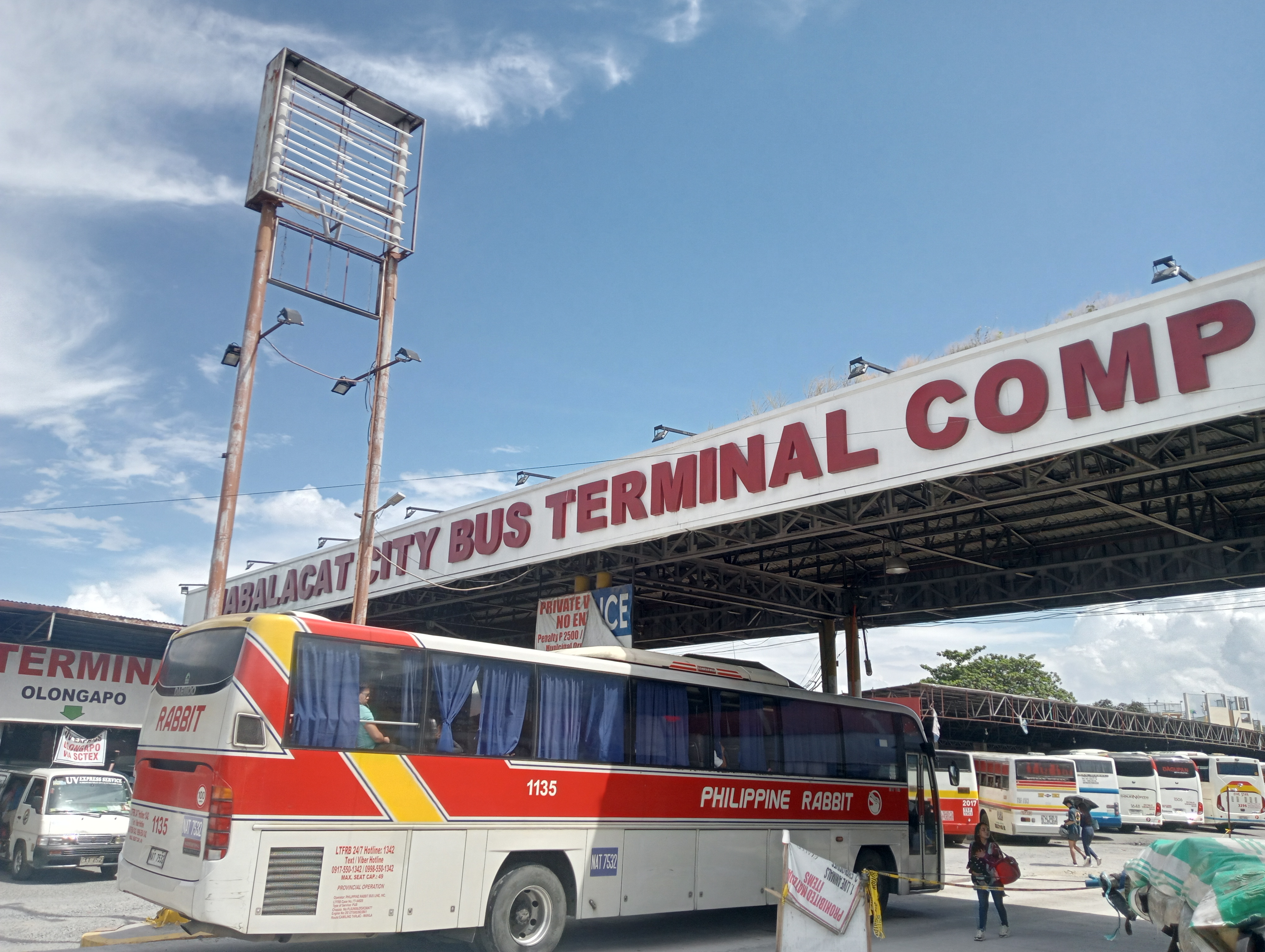
Dau Terminal

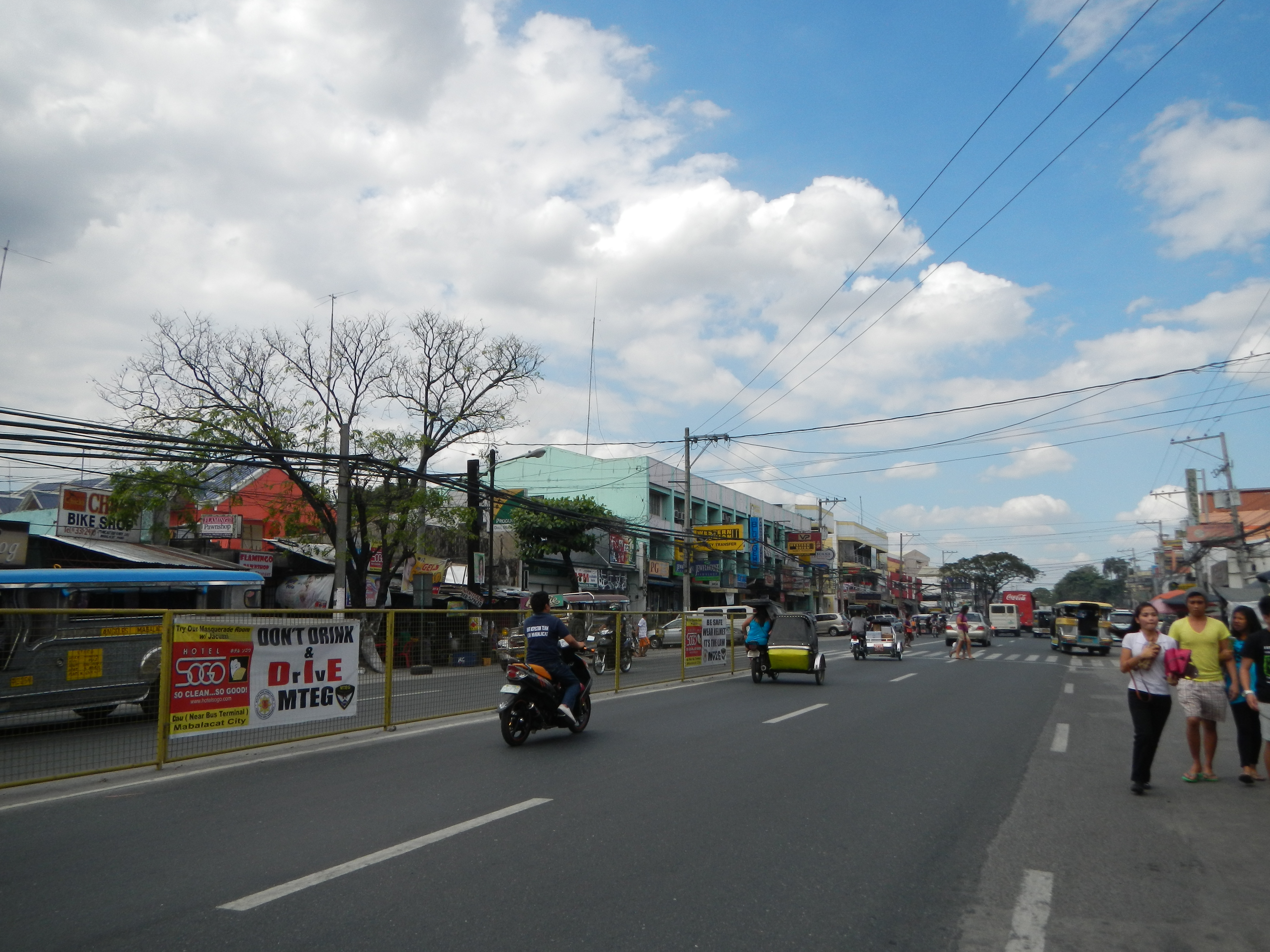
Centre of Mabalacat

The city is also a major transportation hub; a number of major road networks including the North Luzon Expressway, Subic–Clark–Tarlac Expressway, and MacArthur Highway cut across the region. At the southern part of the city is the Dau Bus Terminal, which caters to passengers bound for Metro Manila and provinces in Northern Luzon such as Tarlac, Pangasinan, Ilocos Norte, Ilocos Sur, Nueva Ecija, La Union, Bataan, Baguio, and Zambales.

Ayala Land's Artico Mabalacat is a cold storage at the Pampanga Technopark equipped with 19 cold rooms capable of housing 4,000 pallet positions.

=== Local government ===
Mabalacat City Government is composed of a mayor as a chief executive, and Sangguniang Panlungsod headed by the city vice mayor and 10 Sangguniang Panlungsod members with three ex-officio.

The following are the elected officials of Mabalacat City who assumed office at noon of June 30, 2025 (except for the ex-officio members).

- Mayor: Atty. Gerald Guttrie P. Aquino
- Vice-mayor: Marcos T. Castro Jr.
- Sangguniang Panlungsod:
- Miguel Ignacio M. Morales
- Timothy Paul Llanos Dee
- Victor Rene Ong
- Eroll Jake C. Soliven
- Benjamin D. Jocson
- Marjorie Grace M. Sambo
- Noelito B. Castro
- Dr. Stephen Aurelio
- Patricia Anne L. Acorda
- Elizabeth Pineda

Ex-officio members:

- ABC President Rey Pineda (since December 18, 2023)
- SK President Paul Andre Tiongco (since November 14, 2023)
- Ruvielane S. Margarito

== City fiesta ==
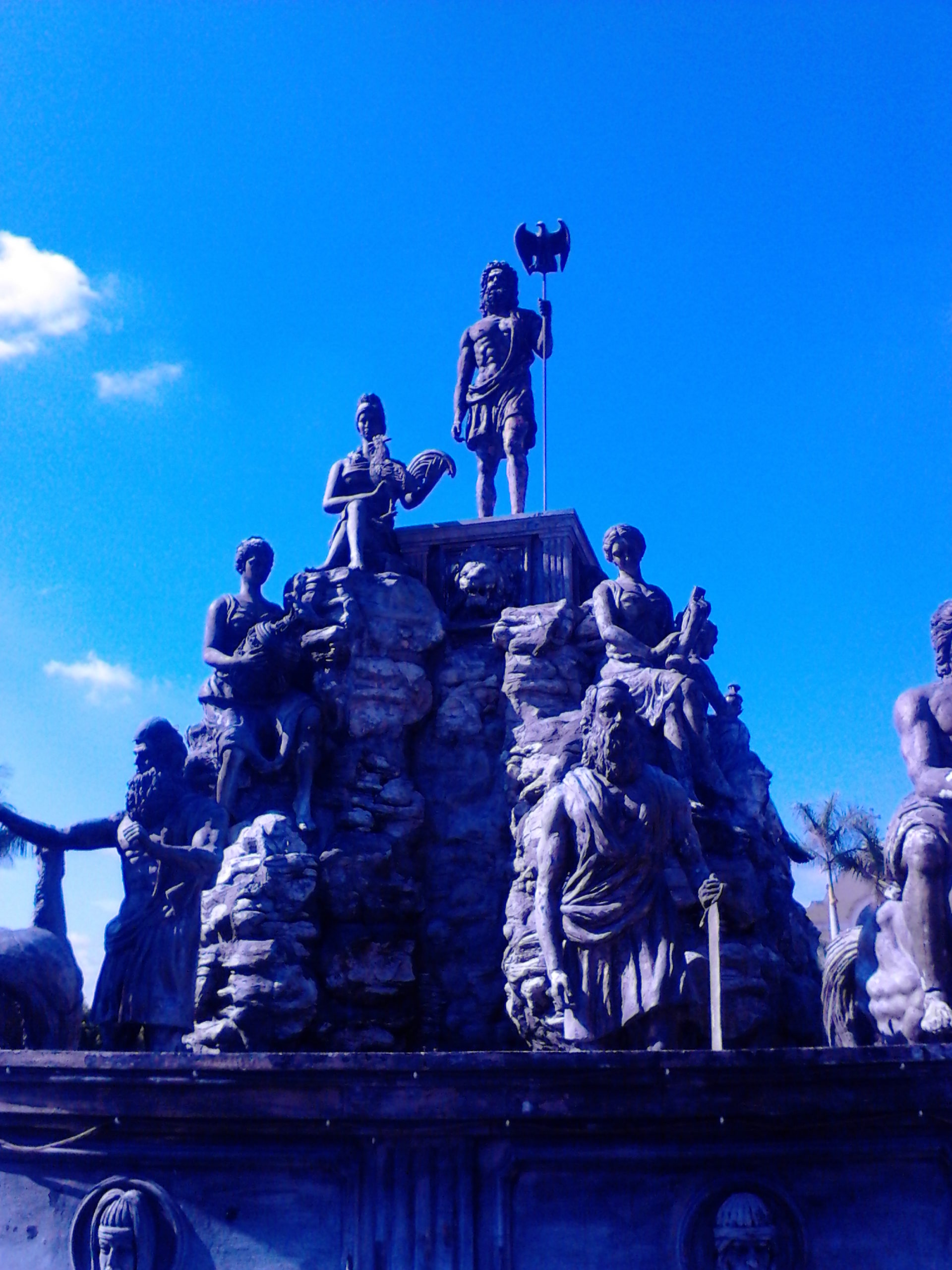
Xevera Fountain

According to legend, when the early settlers were clearing the forests, Cabezang Laureana's workers found, hidden among the bushes, a statue of the Blessed Virgin Mary with baby Jesus sitting on her lap. On February 2, the statue was presented by Caragan as a gift to Padre Maximo Manuguid, the priest of the early Mabalacat Church that was made of sawali and cogon grass. From then on, the city fiesta was observed on the second of February.

The old town hall was named Tabnuan: Mabalacat Cultural Center, or museum of arts, cultural displays and exhibits. It opened on February 28, 2024, the city’s Balacat Festival.

=== Pastorella ===
The pastorella (Misa de Pastores in honor of the shepherds at the birth of Jesus Christ - a set of Latin hymns of the 9-day Christmas Masses) ceased in Pampanga towns for 40 years after Vatican II.

In Mabalacat, however, at Our Lady of Divine Grace Parish, pastorella lives on: In the 4:30 a.m. mass on Monday, the pastorella repertoire includes the Kyrie (Lord, Have Mercy), Gloria (Glory to God in the Highest), Credo (Nicene Creed), Sanctus (Holy) and Agnus Dei (Lamb of God). The hymns are in Latin, except for Kyrie, which is in Greek.

== Parishes ==
- Our Lady of Grace Parish (Poblacion)
- Our Lady of Victories Parish (Dau)
- San Rafael Arkanghel Parish (Mabiga)
- San Lorenzo Ruiz Parish (Dau Access Road)
- Parish of the Lord's Resurrection (Madapdap Resettlement, Dapdap)
- Parish of Christ the Prince of Peace (Mauaque Resettlement, Sapang Biabas)
- Our Lady of Sorrows Parish (Xevera, Tabun)

== Education ==
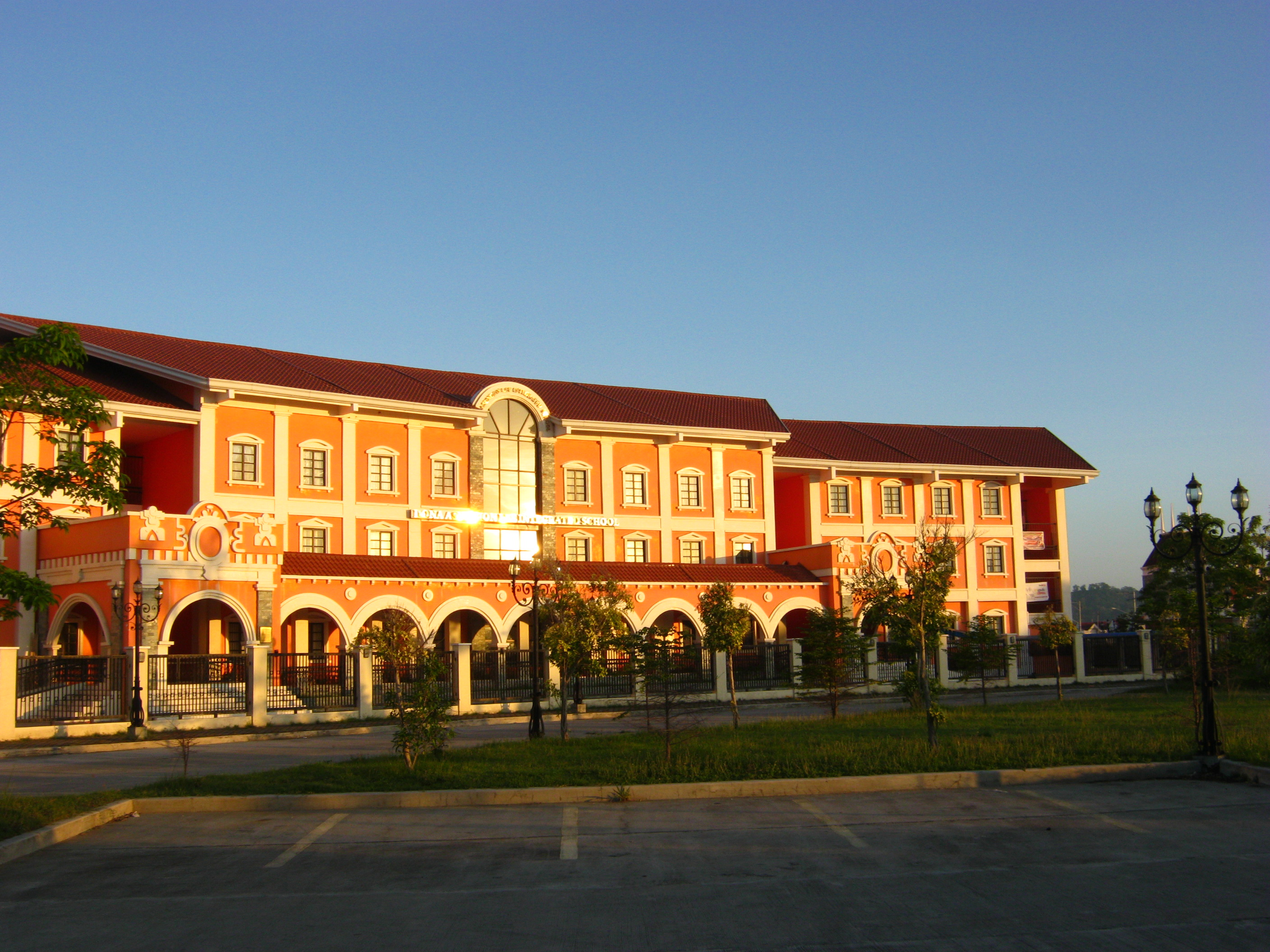
Montessori de Xevera

There are 31 educational institutions in Mabalacat: one state college, one private college, one technical training school, two secondary public, two private high schools and 25 public elementary schools divided into two districts, Mabalacat North and Mabalacat South. Technical Education and Skills Development Authority (TESDA) accredited institutions offering vocational-technical skills abound in the area.

=== State university ===
The University of the Philippines - Diliman Extension Program in Pampanga (Clark) is located in a portion of Clark Freeport Zone that is located in Mabalacat. It offers undergraduate courses such as BA Applied Psychology, BA Business Economics and BS Business Management. It also offers a non-thesis graduate course, Master in Management (MM) (University of the Philippines Diliman - Extension Program in Pampanga, 2020).

=== Private schools ===
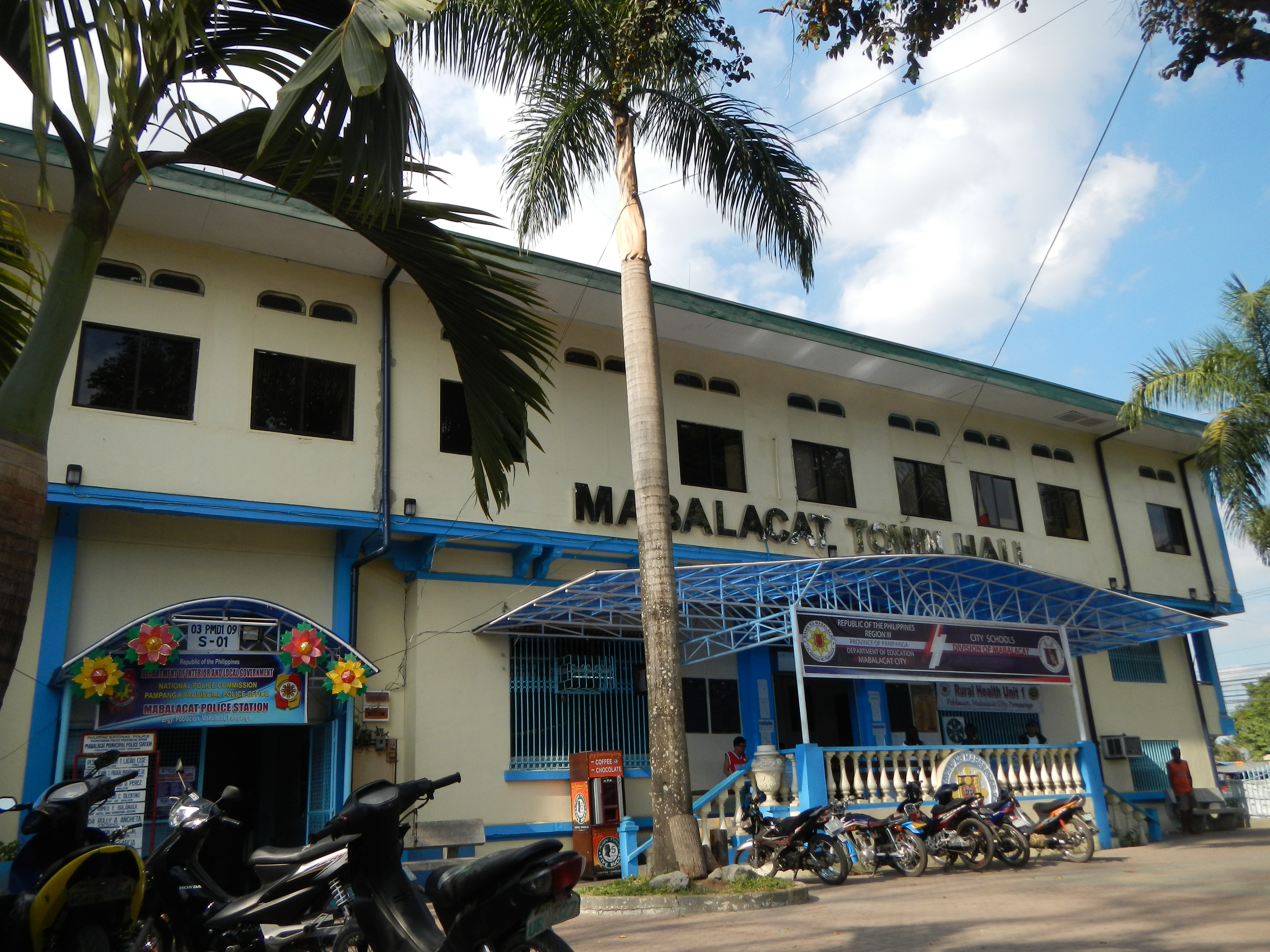
The Town Hall, used prior to Mabalacat's cityhood

Private schools in Mabalacat listed with the Department of Education are Livingstone International School, ACLC Collage Of Mabalacat, Athena's Cradle Center, Inc., Brightstone Learning Center, Children of Fatima School, Inc., Christian Vision Academy Madapdap, Dee Hwa Liong College Foundation, Don Bosco Academy Pampanga (originally from Bacolor; moved to Mabalacat after lahar struck the old campus), Don Teodoro V. Santos Institute, Doña Asuncion Lee Integrated School, Great Shepherd Christian Academy, Immanuel Montessori School, Inc., Clark College of Science and Technology, Jose C. Feliciano College, Mabalacat Christian Academy, Mary Help of Christians School, Inc., Montessori School of St. Nicholas, Nehemiah Christian School, Inc., School of the Infant Jesus the Empowered Zone for Excellence in Education, Inc. Dau, Shield of Victory Christian School, St. Anthony College of Technology, St. Mutien College, and Divine Grace Academy, FDSA Aviation College of Science and Technology Inc, and the Maranatha Christian Academy.

Listed with and accredited by TESDA is the Asian Institute of Computer Studies (AICS), a private technical school offering I.T. courses.

== Notable persons ==
=== Miss International ===
Melanie Marquez, Miss International 1979

== Gallery ==
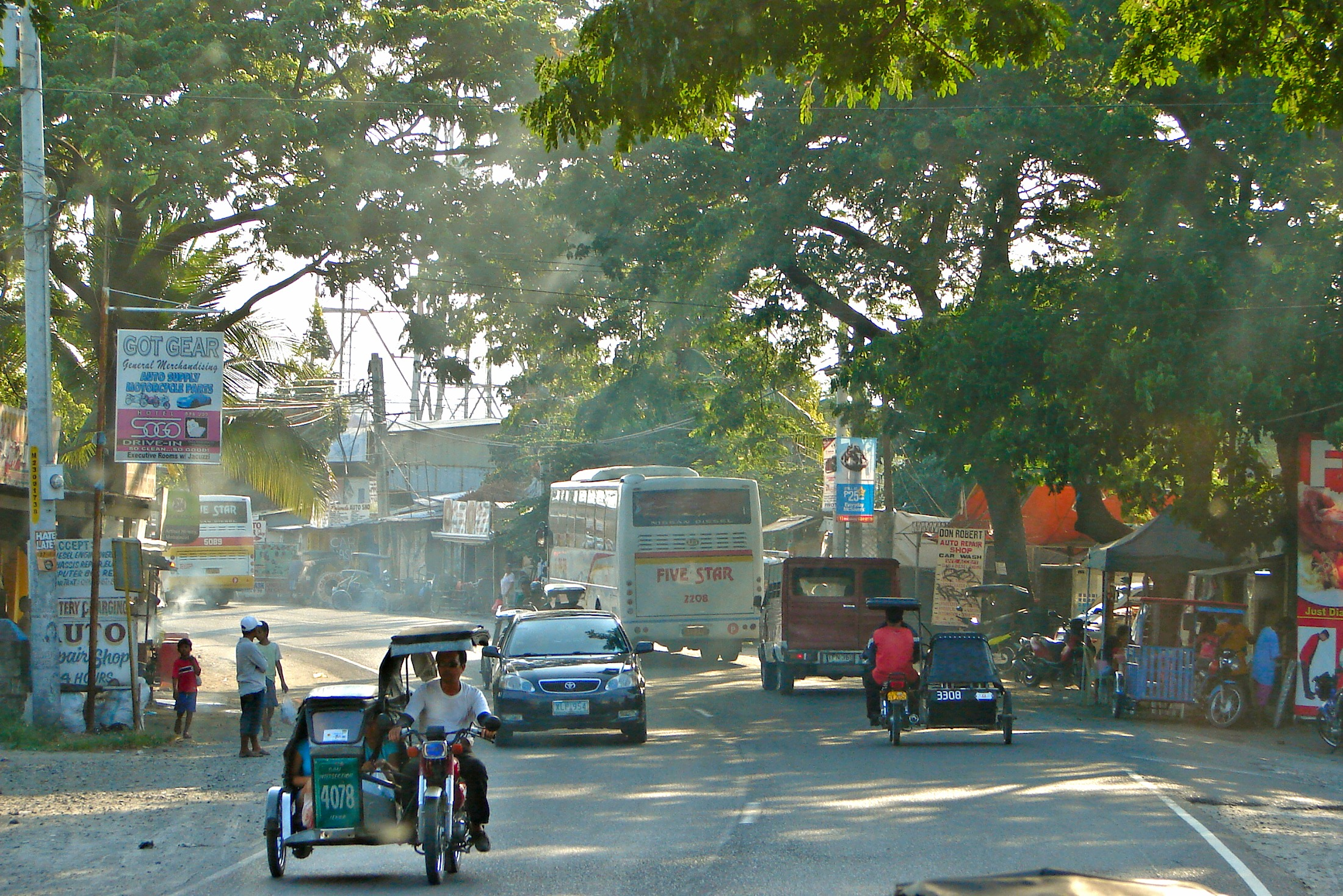
Entering Mabalacat

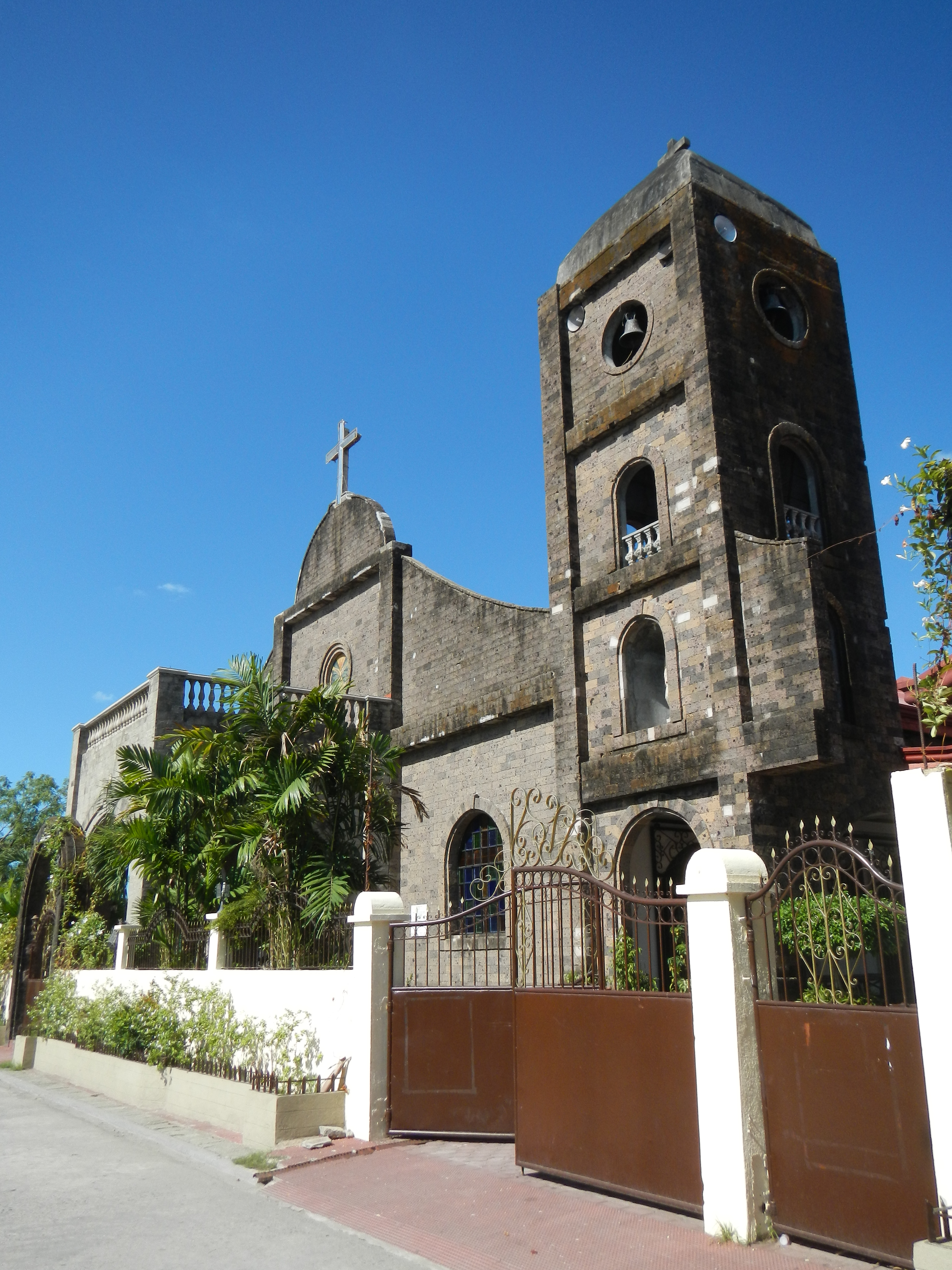
Parish of Christ the Prince of Peace, located at Mauaque Resettlement, Sapang Biabas

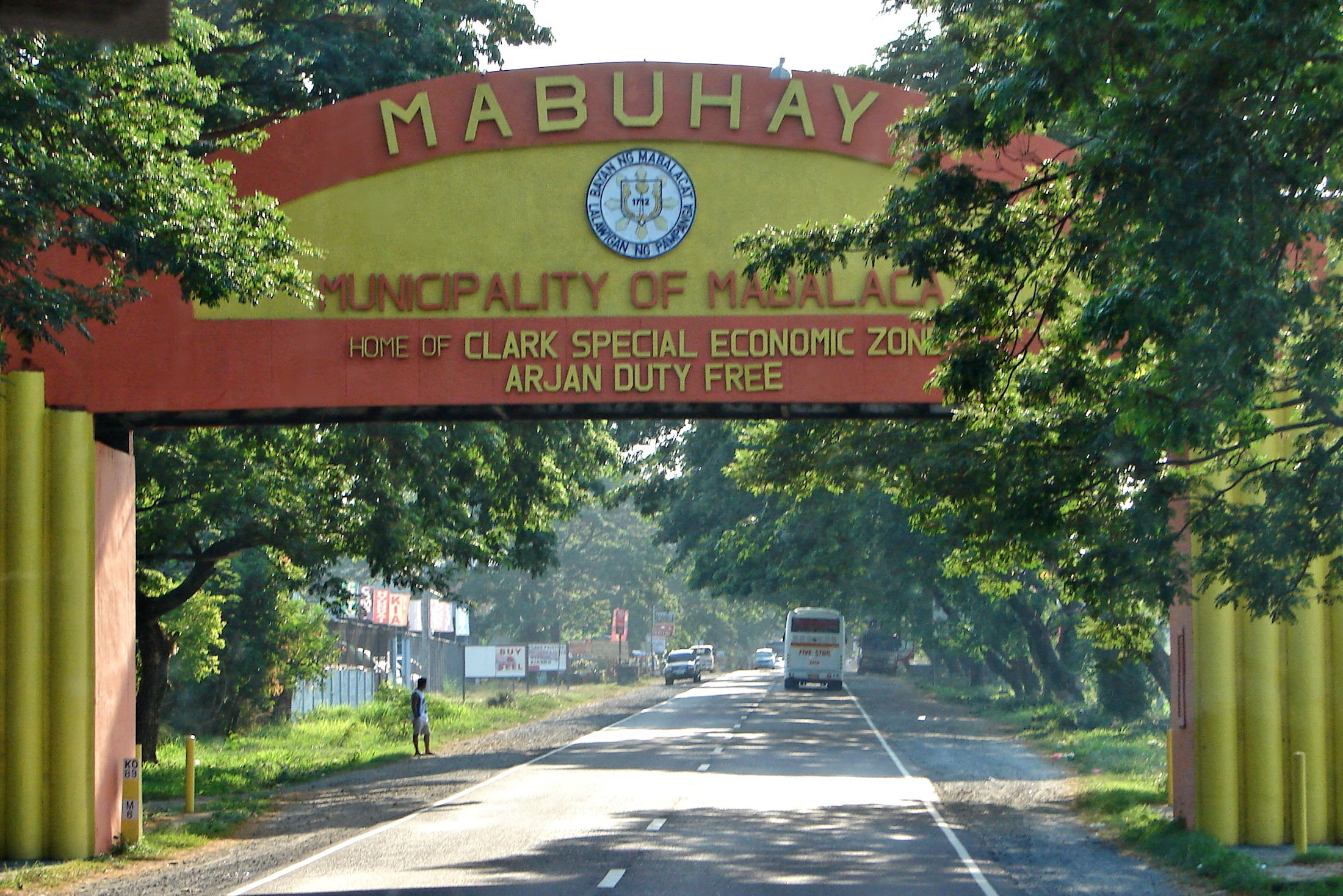
Mabalacat welcome arch
