= Jose P. Dans, Jr. =

Filipino civil engineer and former Minister of Transportation and Communication

Jose Patricio Dans, Jr. (September 26, 1928 – November 29, 1998) was a Filipino civil engineer and former Minister of Transportation and Communication.

== Early life and education ==
Jose P. Dans, Jr. was born on September 26, 1928, in Paete, Laguna. His parents were Filomena Ferrer and Jose Patricio Dans, who once served as the Director of Bureau of Lands during the Commonwealth and post-war period. Dans, Jr. was the great, great-grandson of renowned 19th century painter Jose Luciano Dans.
