= Ippolita Rostagno =

American jewelry designer

- Born: December 10, 1963 (age 62); Florence, Italy
- Occupation: Jewelry designer

Ippolita Rostagno (born December 10, 1963) is an Italian-American jewelry designer based in New York City.

== Personal life ==
Born December 10, 1963 in Florence, Italy, Ippolita Rostagno is the daughter of an American artist and an Italian intellectual.

Raised and educated in the hills of Tuscany, Ippolita attended elementary school in a one-room medieval schoolhouse and went on to study sculpture and earn her baccalauréat degree from the Istituto D’Arte in Florence.

Ippolita immigrated to the United States at age 18, moving to Los Angeles where she continued her studies at Occidental College and founded an alternative poetry and dance company called Rime together with Anna Stump in 1984.

After completing her BA in English Literature, Ippolita moved to New York City in 1986 and married a fashion photographer and gave birth to her daughter Maya in 1988.

== Career ==
In 1999 Ippolita founded the jewelry brand Ippolita. Bergdorf Goodman bought her first designs. The company was sold to Castanea Partners in 2007 and bought back by a group led by Ippolita in July 2018. Ippolita holds the position of CEO and Creative Director and leads the design and manufacture of her eponymous line, which includes collections in 18k gold, sterling silver, rosé (a proprietary alloy of sterling silver with 18k gold and 18k rose gold) and non-metal materials, such as Resin.

Silhouettes include stackable bangles, layering necklaces, earrings, rings and pendants.

The product is handcrafted and materials are sourced from all over the world. Ippolita’s collections are sold at department stores including Neiman Marcus, Saks Fifth Avenue, Bergdorf Goodman, Bloomingdale's and Nordstrom, as well as through independent jewelry stores. Internationally, the jewelry is sold at Harrods, Holt Renfrew and specialty retailers throughout the Caribbean.

Her clients include Kate Hudson, Charlize Theron, Jennifer Lopez and Courteney Cox.

== Awards and honors ==
In August 2011, Ippolita was inducted into the Council of Fashion Designers of America (CFDA).

Ippolita’s sculpture and video installation exhibit “Reliquary” was showcased at Highline Stages in New York City in September 2011.
