= Hippolyte-Louis =

Hippolyte-Louis may refer to:

- Hippolyte Louis Bazin (20th century), Apostolic Vicar of French Sudan of the Roman Catholic Archdiocese of Bamako
- Charles Hippolyte Louis Jules Binet, dit Binet-Sanglé (1868–1941), French doctor
- Hippolyte-Louis-Florent Bis (1789–1855), French playwright
- Arnaud Hippolyte Louis Daniel (12th century), Occitan troubadour
- Hippolyte-Louis-Alexandre Dechet (1801–1830), French actor
- Armand-Hippolyte-Louis Fizeau (1819–1896), French physicist
- Hippolyte-Louis Guérin de Litteau (1797–1861), French poet
- Hippolyte Louis Gory (1800–1852), French entomologist
- Hippolyte Louis Edouard Prétot (19th century), French shipwright; see List of ship launches in 1842
- Hippolyte Louis Jean Simon (21st century), bishop of the Roman Catholic Archdiocese of Clermont

== See also ==
- Louis-Hippolyte (given name)
- Hippolyte (name)
- Louis (name)
- Louis (disambiguation)
- Hippolyte (disambiguation)
