= Monument to the Martyrs of the 1830 Revolution =

Monument in Brussels, Belgium

- Monument aux martyrs de la révolution de 1830 (French); Monument voor de martelaren van de revolutie van 1830 (Dutch)
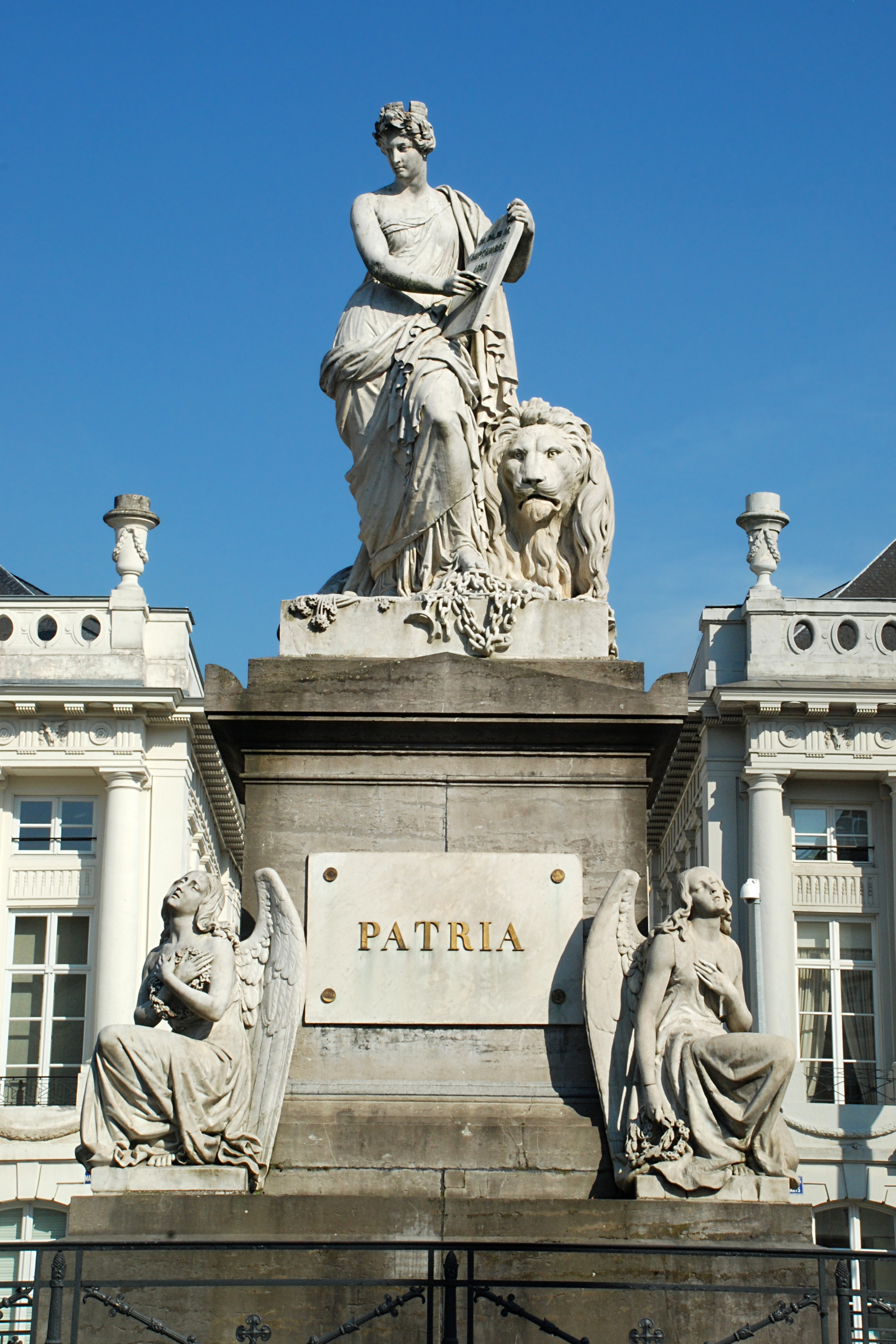
- Monument to the Martyrs of the 1830 Revolution (or Pro Patria Monument)
- Location: Place des Martyrs / Martelaarsplein; 1000 City of Brussels, Brussels-Capital Region, Belgium
- Coordinates: 50°51′06″N 4°21′23″E
- Designer: Louis Roelandt, Guillaume Geefs
- Beginning date: 1836
- Completion date: 1849
- Dedicated to: Victims of the Belgian Revolution

The Monument to the Martyrs of the 1830 Revolution (French: Monument aux martyrs de la révolution de 1830; Dutch: Monument voor de martelaren van de revolutie van 1830), also known as the Pro Patria Monument (lit. 'Monument to the Fatherland'), is an allegorical monument on the Place des Martyrs/Martelaarsplein in Brussels, Belgium, commemorating the victims of the Belgian Revolution of 1830.

The monument was designed in 1836 by the architect Louis Roelandt in neoclassical style, sculpted by the sculptor Guillaume Geefs, and inaugurated in 1838. However, the sculpted decoration made up of bas-reliefs and angels in white marble was only completed by Geefs in 1849. The monument received protected status in 1963.

== History ==
=== Inception and construction ===
During the fighting of the Belgian Revolution in 1830, the need arose to bury the first victims. The Administrative Commission, created in the absence of any other legal authority, chose the Place Saint-Michel/Sint-Michielsplein ("Saint Michael's Square"), as it was called then, to receive "the remains of the citizens who died in the memorable days of September". On 2 October 1830, the square was renamed the Place des Martyrs/Martelaarsplein (lit. 'Martyrs' Square'), a decision made official on 30 July 1831 by a decree of the then-mayor of the City of Brussels, Nicolas-Jean Rouppe. Beneath the cobblestones were buried 466 heroes of the September Days. The square then became one of the high places of celebration of national identity.

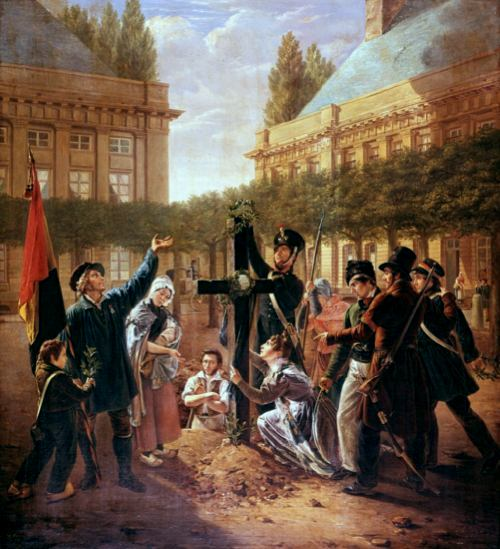
Glorification of a Hero of 1830 (1831) by Jean Henri De Coene depicts a romanticised view of the interment of the first "martyrs" in the Place Saint-Michel/Sint-Michielsplein.

The idea of building a commemorative monument in the middle of the square soon germinated. The Provisional Government and the National Congress subscribed to it from 23 November 1830, but the project took a long time to come to fruition. On 11 May 1831, a Commission was set up to open a competition for the monument. The subscription-based undertaking proved difficult to finance, despite some large donations, such as those of the politician Félix de Mérode, who had donated 16,000 florins. In 1832, the Chamber of Representatives finally released a sum of 15,000 florins for the construction.

After a competition was launched, fifteen plans were submitted, none of which gave satisfaction. The Commission was then invited by the then-Minister of the Interior, Charles Rogier, to designate an eminent artist. Its choice fell on the court sculptor of King Leopold I, Guillaume Geefs, who submitted a first draft. As this proposal was not unanimous, the sculptor modified it and a definitive project was finally adopted in 1836. The monument, which was inaugurated on 24 September 1838, however, was not yet finished. It took until 1840 for the sculpted angels to be installed and 1849 for the last bas-relief to be in place.

=== Later history ===
The construction of the Pro Patria Monument led to a radical alteration of the square by eliminating the perspective of the Rue Saint-Michel/Sint-Michielsstraat towards the Rue du Persil/Peterseliestraat. According to the historian Guillaume Des Marez, the statue is "undeniably too large in size and harms the primitive design of the work". In 1839, the addition of two small fenced flowerbeds surrounded by lampposts on both sides of the monument changed the square's appearance once again, as did the installation of fountains in 1841, which were replaced by pools in 1861. In 1897–98, two smaller monuments were erected there, one in honour of the actor and poet Jenneval, and the other of the Count Frédéric de Mérode.

The monument received protected status through a royal decree issued on 10 June 1963, at the same time as the rest of the square. It was the subject of a restoration and cleaning campaign in 2019–2020. On that occasion, the old outdoor lighting was replaced with new less energy-consuming LED lighting and the technical room was waterproofed and refurbished.

== Monument ==
The monument, built in blue stone and adorned with white Carrara marble statues and panels, stands in the middle of a courtyard surrounded by a funerary crypt dug in the centre of the Place des Martyrs. It is surmounted by an allegorical figure of Liberty inscribing the days of 23, 24, 25 and 26 September 1830 in the golden book of History with, at her feet, the Leo Belgicus lying on the broken chains of slavery.

Beneath the statue, the pedestal is adorned at the corners with four leaning angels representing Prayer, Combat, Victory and Inhumation, and on its faces with marble slabs bearing, to the west and east, the words "PATRIA" and "DECRETUM DIE XXV.SEPT. MDCCCXXX / ABSOLUTUM DIE XXV.SEPT. MDCCCXL / LEOPOLDO I REGNANTE.", and to the north and south, crowns of palms.

The square base is located for the most part below the level of the square, the four sides of which are decorated with bas-reliefs representing scenes from the Belgian Revolution; to the south: The oath of the patriots on the Grand-Place, to the north: The attack on the park commanded by Van Halen, to the east: The blessing of the tombs of the heroes by the dean of Saint Gudula, and to the west: Belgium crowning its heroes with laurels.

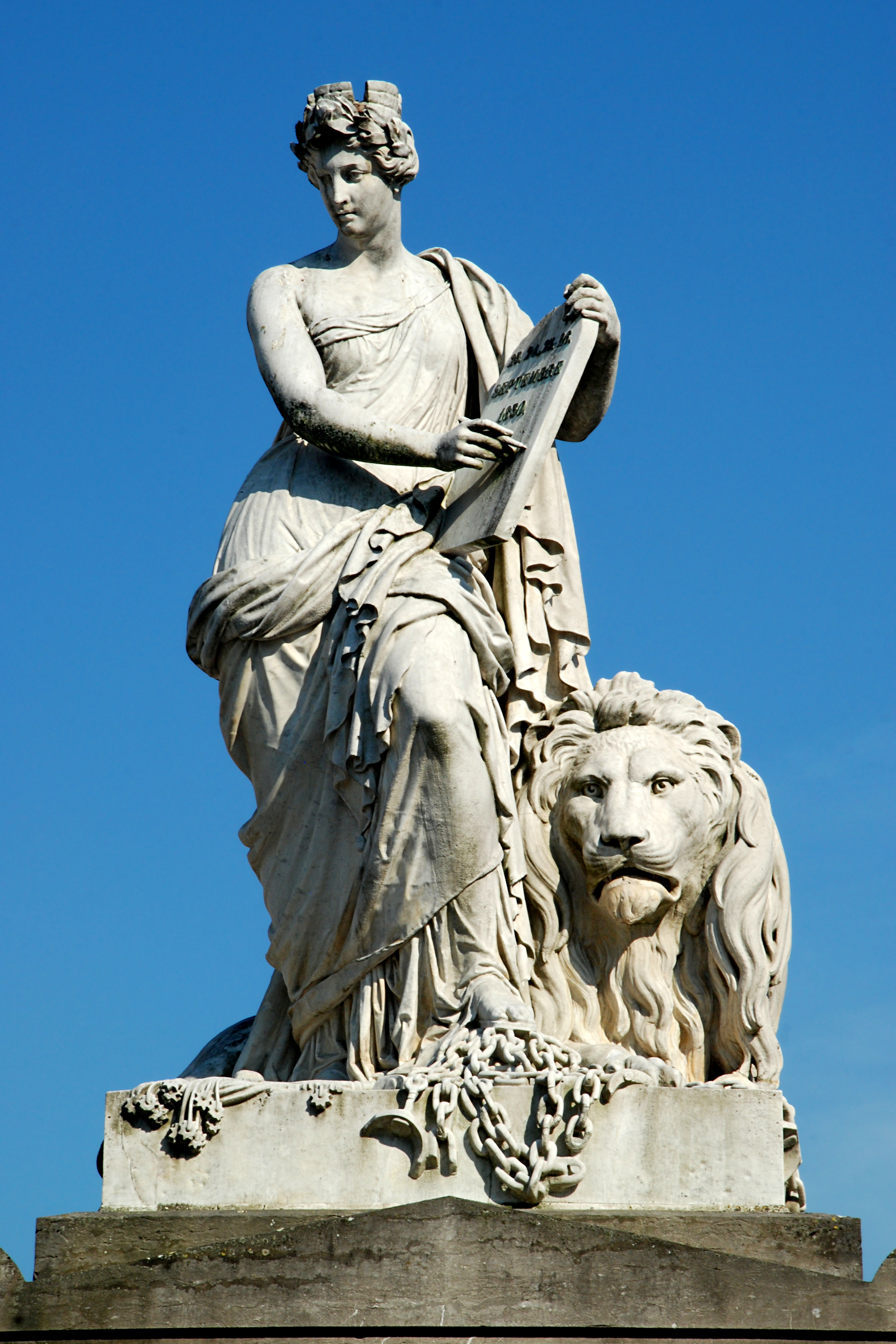
Statue depicting Liberty with the Leo Belgicus

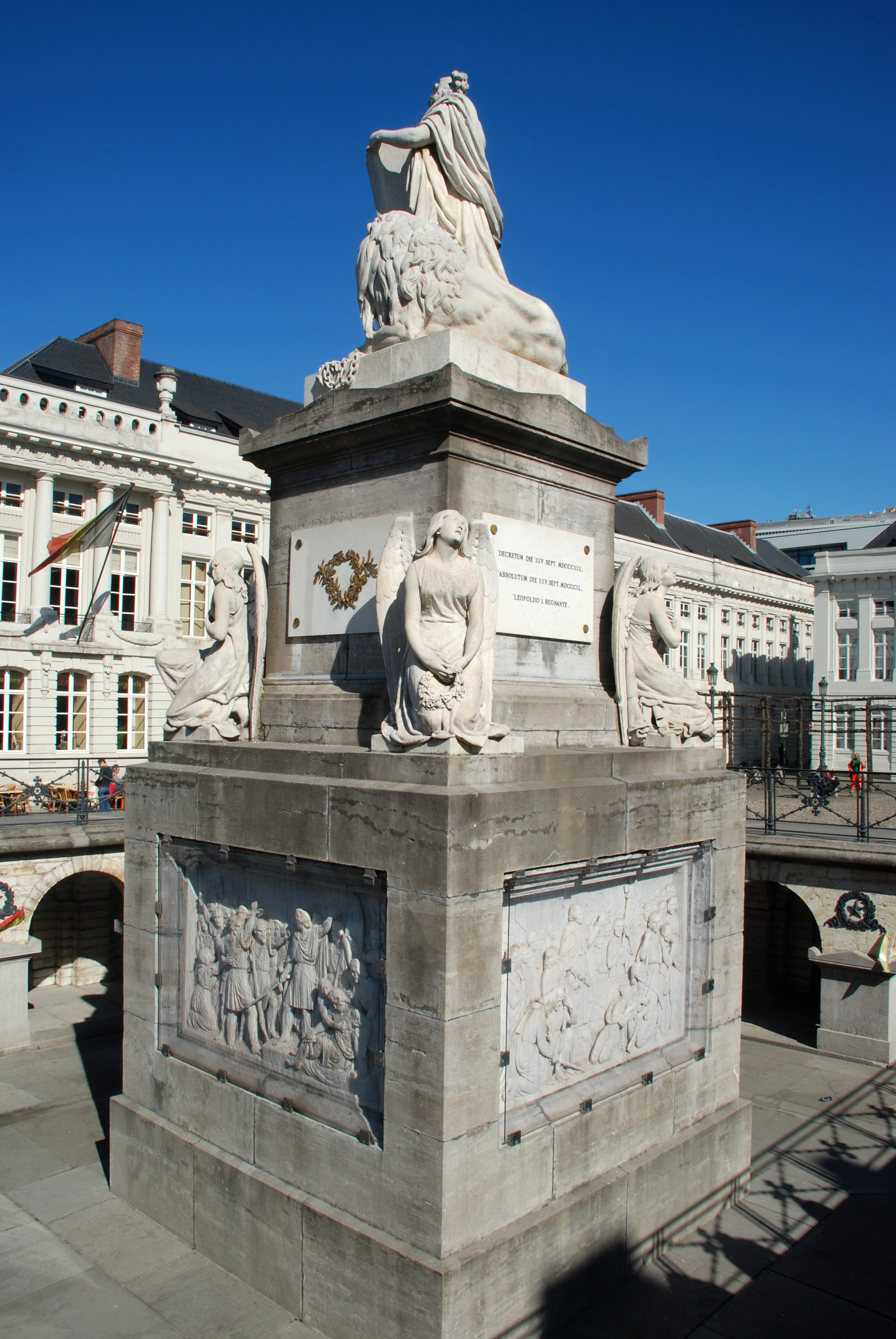
The monument seen from the south-east

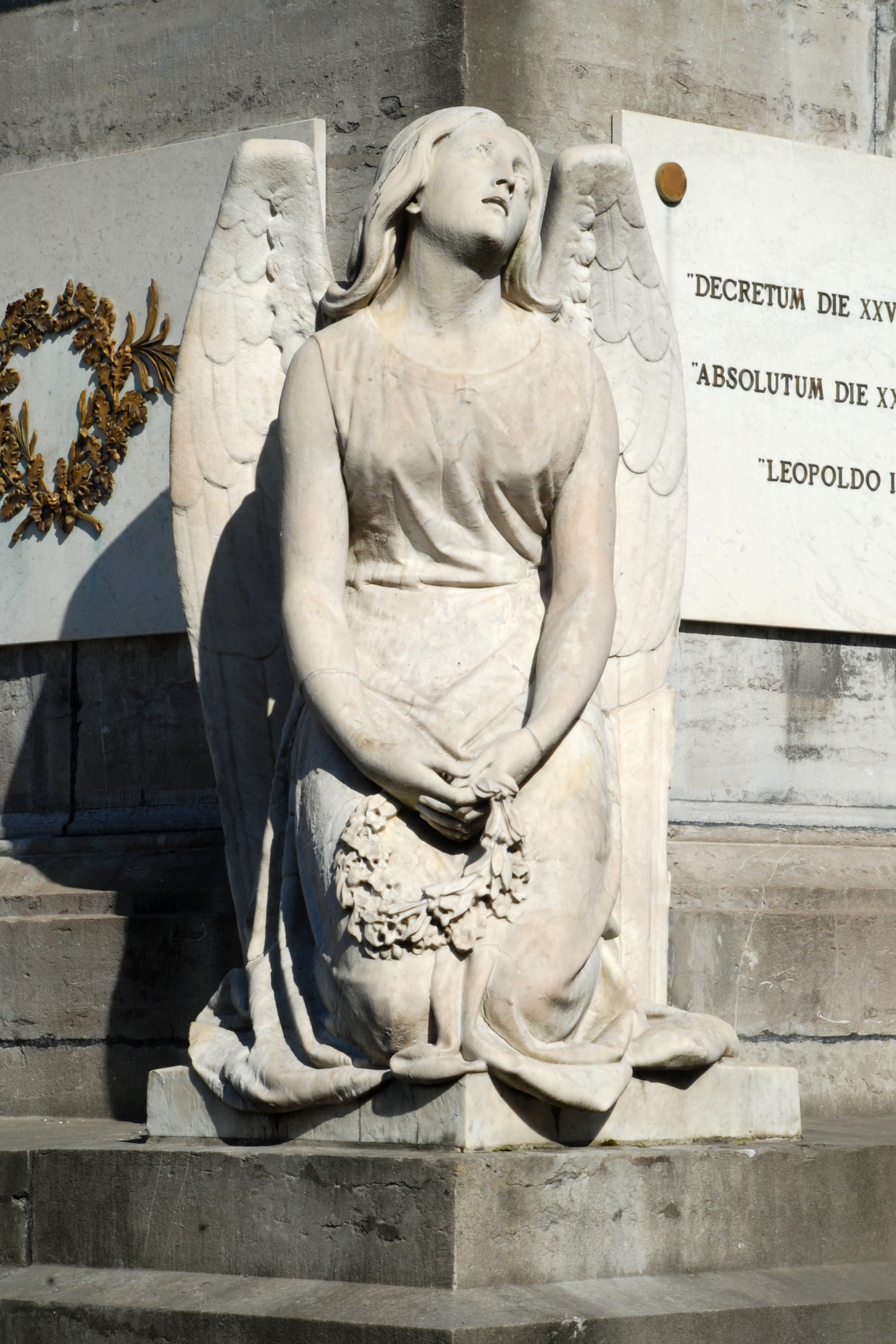
The angel located at the south-eastern corner

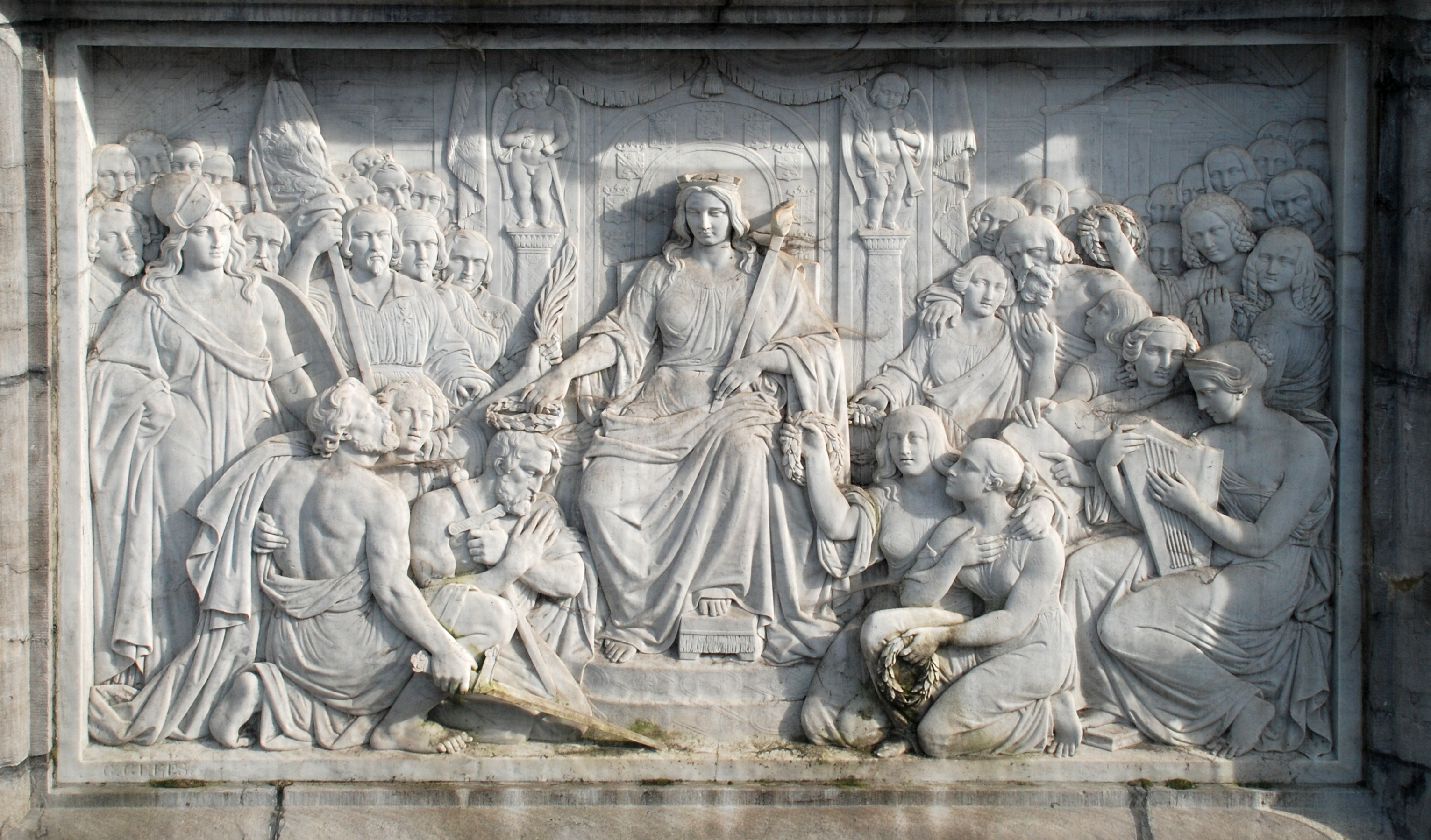
Belgium crowning its heroes with laurels

== Crypt ==
The funerary crypt below the monument is in the form of a covered gallery with a square plan whose arched arcades in white stone rest on powerful pillars in blue stone. Each pillar is surmounted by a crowning that recalls the motif that adorns the base of the Liberty statue's pedestal, consisting of a five-pointed star surrounded by a wreath of acanthus and laurel.

The gallery is adorned with 27 black marble plaques on which are engraved in gold lettering the decree of 25 September 1830 and the names of 466 revolutionaries who fell during the battles of September 1830: 183 Brussels' residents, 132 Flemings, 123 Walloons and 28 foreigners.

At square level, the crypt is surrounded by four steps and a wrought iron balustrade reprising the star motif and confined by four lampposts on a base decorated with rams' heads. Access to the crypt is via two staircases located to the east.

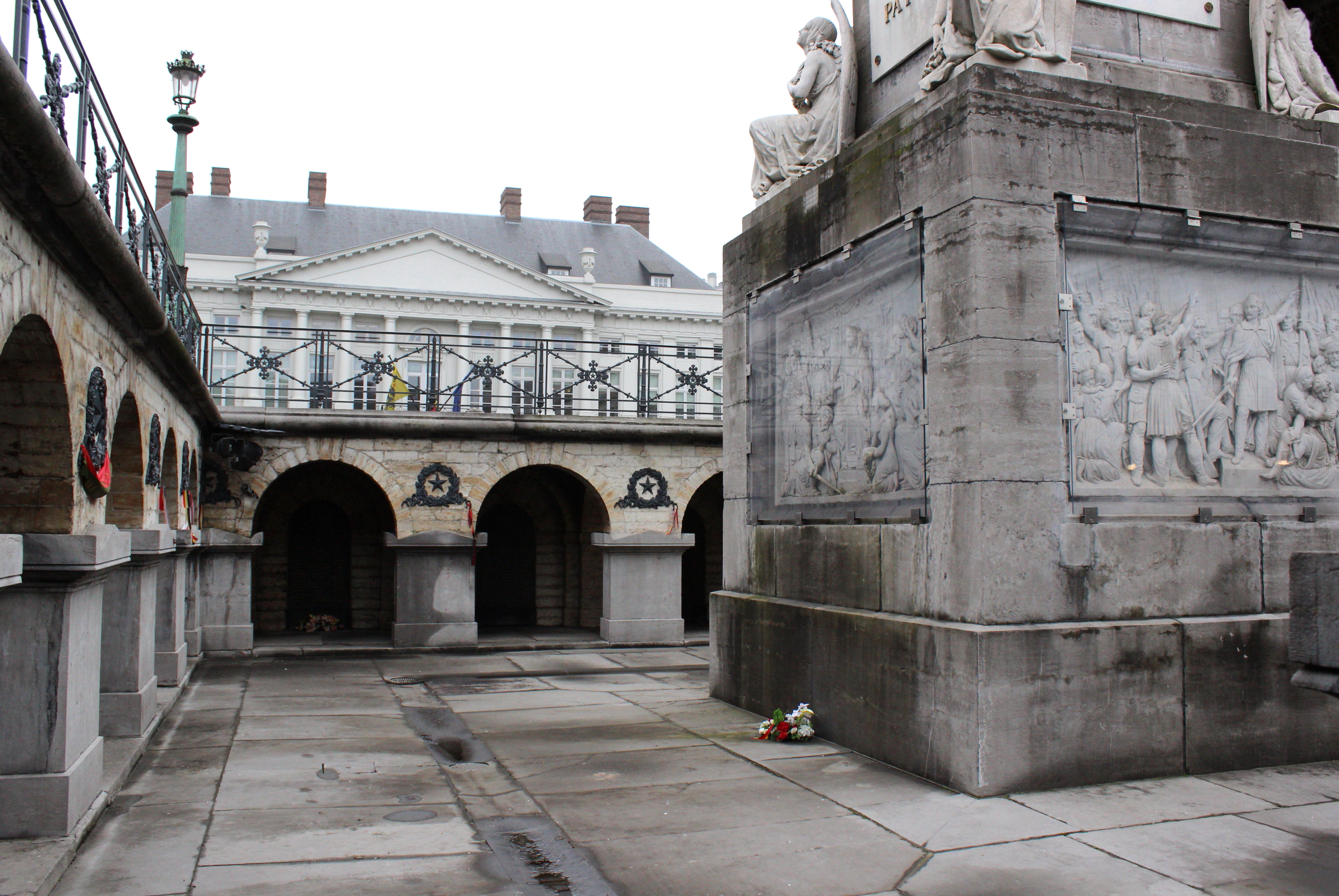
Galleries of the funerary crypt and partial view of the bas-reliefs of the base

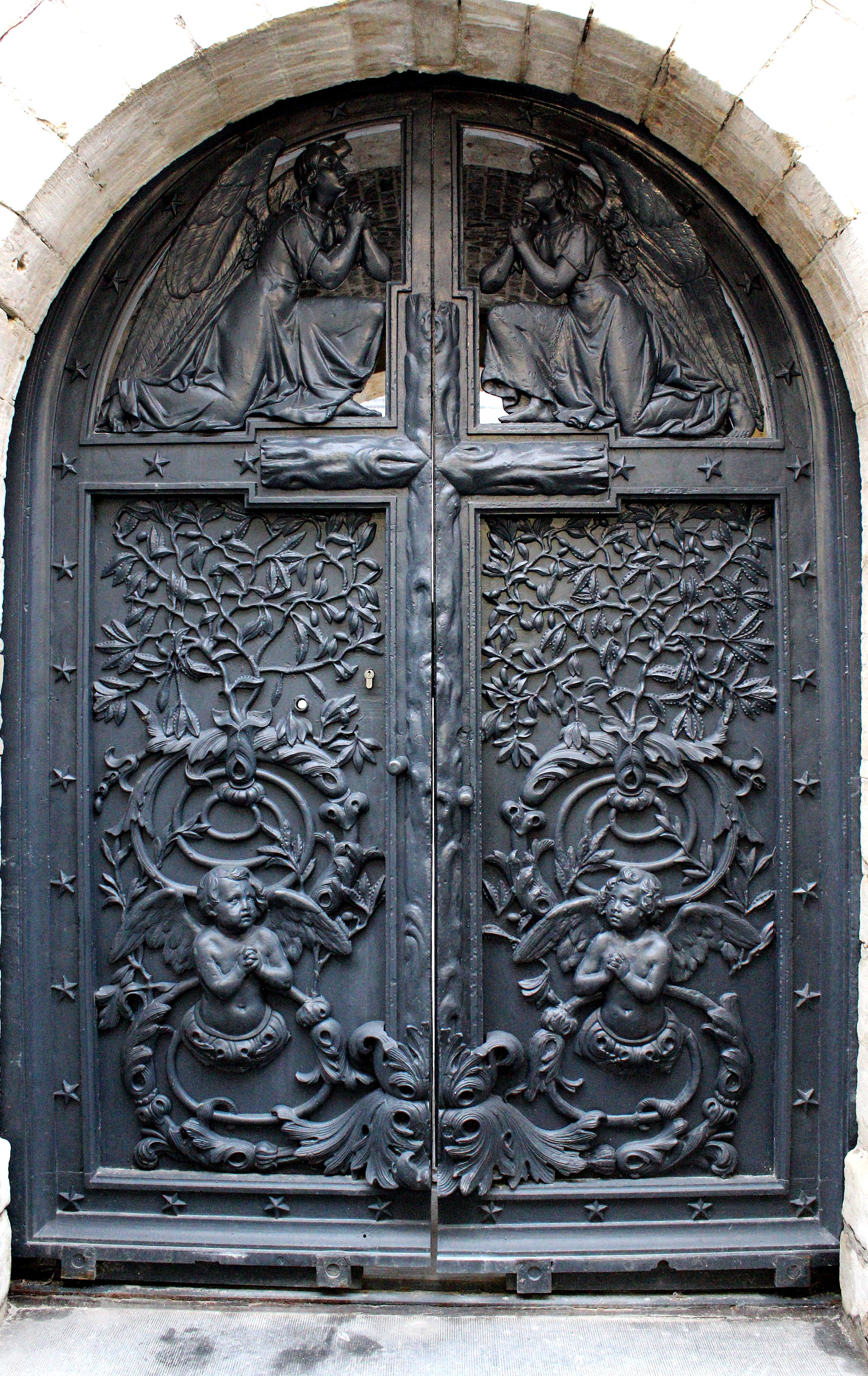
Access door to the crypt

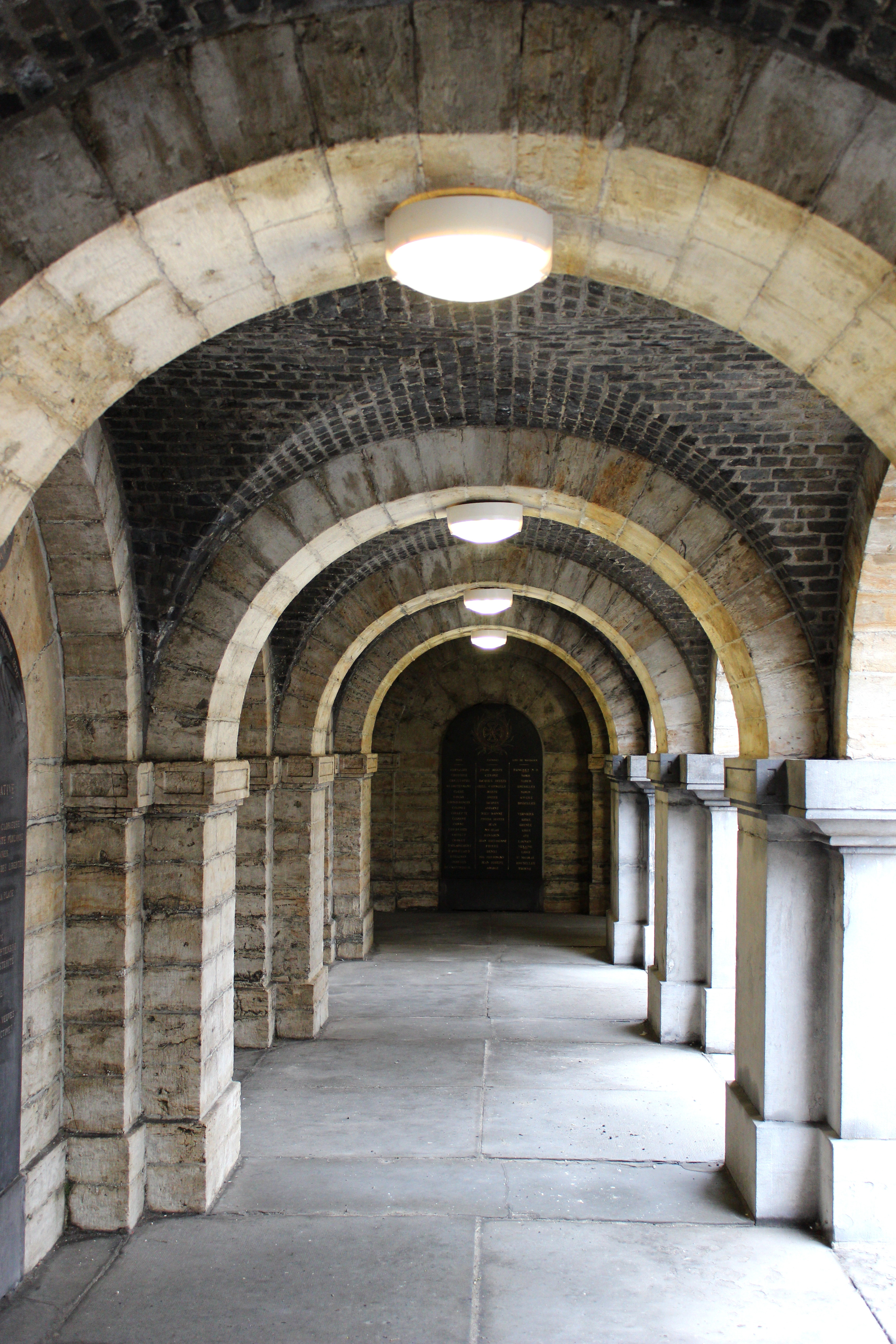
Gallery of the crypt

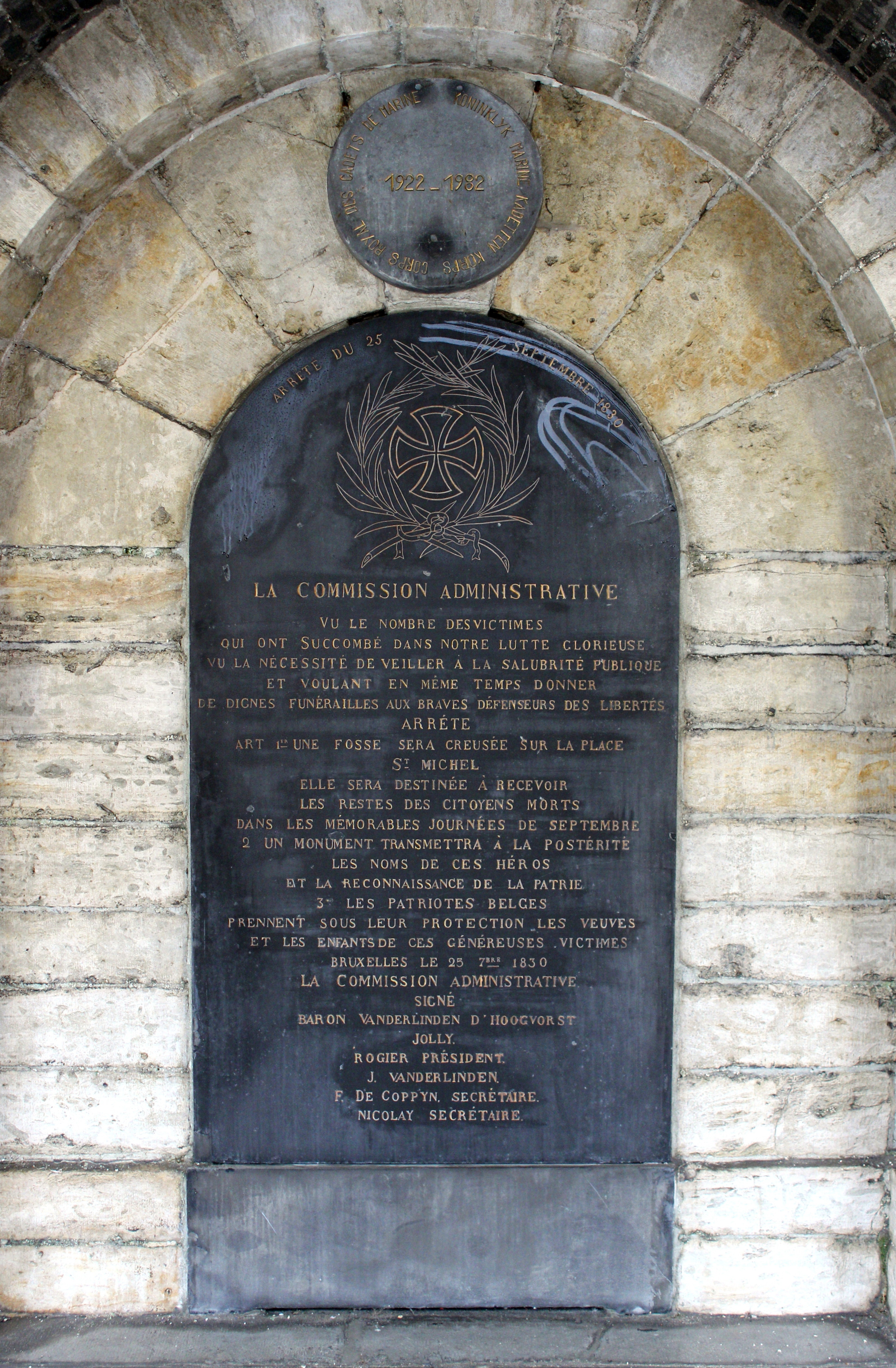
Plaque in the crypt recalling the Administrative Commission's decision

== See also ==
- Neoclassical architecture in Belgium
- Sculpture in Brussels
- History of Brussels
- Culture of Belgium
- Belgium in the long nineteenth century
