= Place des Martyrs, Brussels =

Square in Brussels, Belgium

Place des Martyrs (French); Martelaarsplein (Dutch)
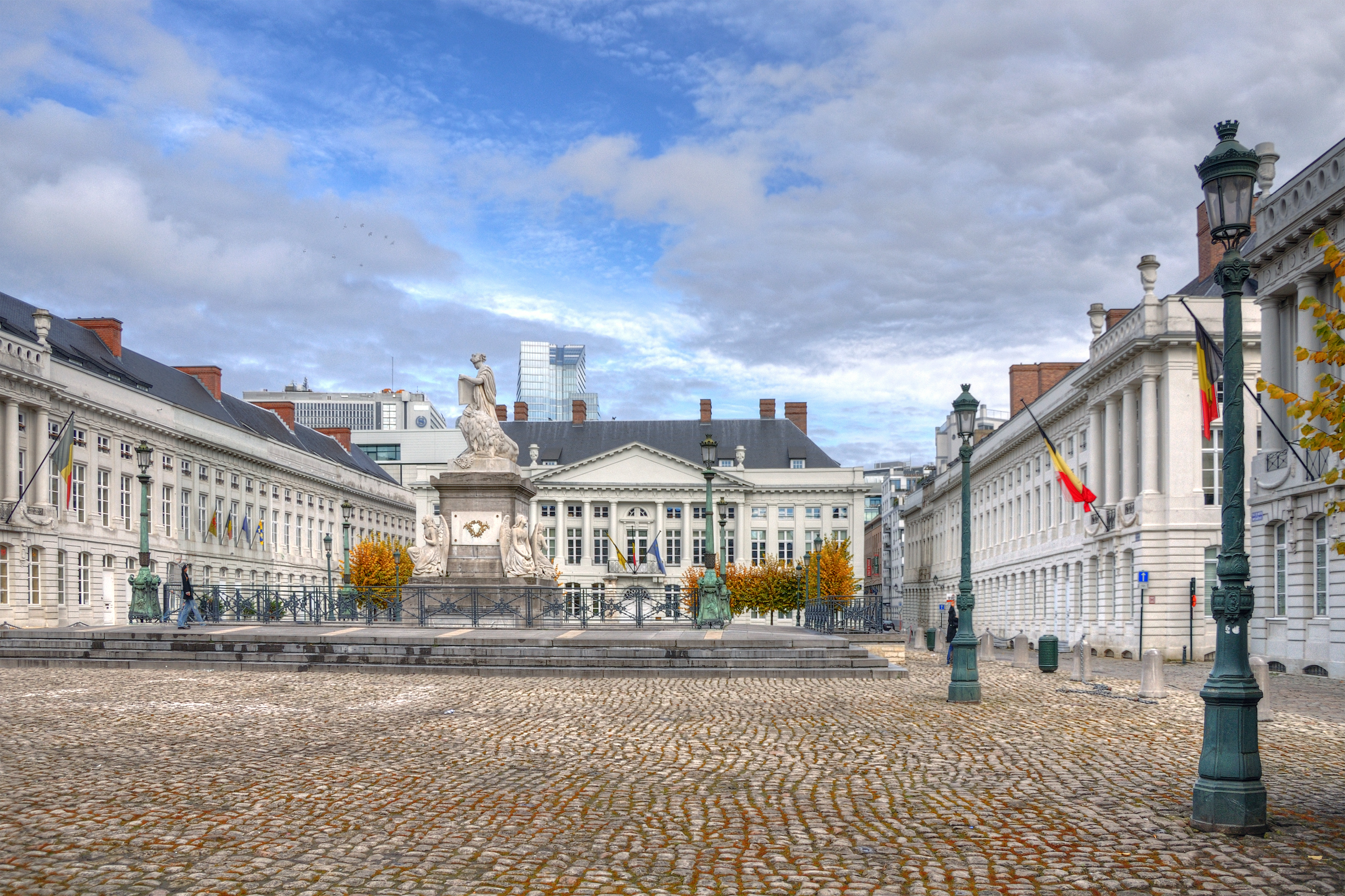
- The Place des Martyrs/Martelaarsplein with the Pro Patria Monument in its centre

- Location within Brussels Location within Belgium
- Type: Square
- Location: City of Brussels, Brussels-Capital Region, Belgium
- Quarter: Marais–Jacqmain Quarter
- Postal code: 1000
- Nearest metro station: 1 5 De Brouckère
- Coordinates: 50°51′05″N 04°21′22″E

Construction
- Completed: c. 1776

Other
- Designer: Claude Fisco

The Place des Martyrs (French, pronounced [plas de maʁ.tiʁ]) or Martelaarsplein (Dutch, pronounced [ˈmɑrtəlaːrsˌplɛin]), meaning "Martyrs' Square", is a historic square in central Brussels, Belgium. Its current name refers to the martyrs of the September Days of the Belgian Revolution of 1830.

Originally, the square was called the Place Saint-Michel/Sint-Michielsplein after Saint Michael, patron saint of the City of Brussels. It was laid out in a uniform neoclassical style between 1774 and 1776, based on the designs of the architect Claude Fisco. Over 400 heroes of the Belgian Revolution lie buried in a crypt beneath the cobblestones. Many lie not far from where they were shot, in fierce battles amid the Brussels streets and barricades. Nowadays, the square is home to cabinet offices of the Flemish Government, including those of the Flemish Minister-President, as well as a theatre: the Théâtre des Martyrs.

The Place des Martyrs is located in the Marais–Jacqmain Quarter, near the Rue Neuve/Nieuwstraat, Belgium's second busiest shopping street. This area is served by the metro and premetro (underground tram) station De Brouckère on lines 1, 4, 5 and 10.

== History ==
=== Early history ===
The Place des Martyrs was built on what was formerly Den Blijck, a bleachfield for washed textiles. In 1773, the City of Brussels, which had acquired this plot of land, commissioned the architect Claude Fisco, controller of the works of the city, to design in its place a new neoclassical square. The works, which also involved digging several arteries, lasted from 1774 until 1776. The square was originally named the Place Saint-Michel/Sint-Michielsplein ("Saint Michael's Square"), after Saint Michael, the city's patron saint. This hodonym indicates the importance that the city's authorities attached to the operation, which was a first in Brussels, where it marked a radical break, aesthetically, typologically and urbanistically, with traditional practices.

In 1776, the then-director of the Théâtre de la Monnoye, Ignaz Vitzthumb, obtained permission to erect a "portable theatre" on the square; a small wooden building, light and removable, on which he gave plays in Dutch. Losing money, the operation resulted in the sale of the theatre in March 1777. In 1795, under the French regime, street and place names with any sort of religious connotation were changed, and the square was temporarily renamed the Place de la Blanchisserie/Blekerijplein ("Laundry Square"), reminiscing the site's original usage.

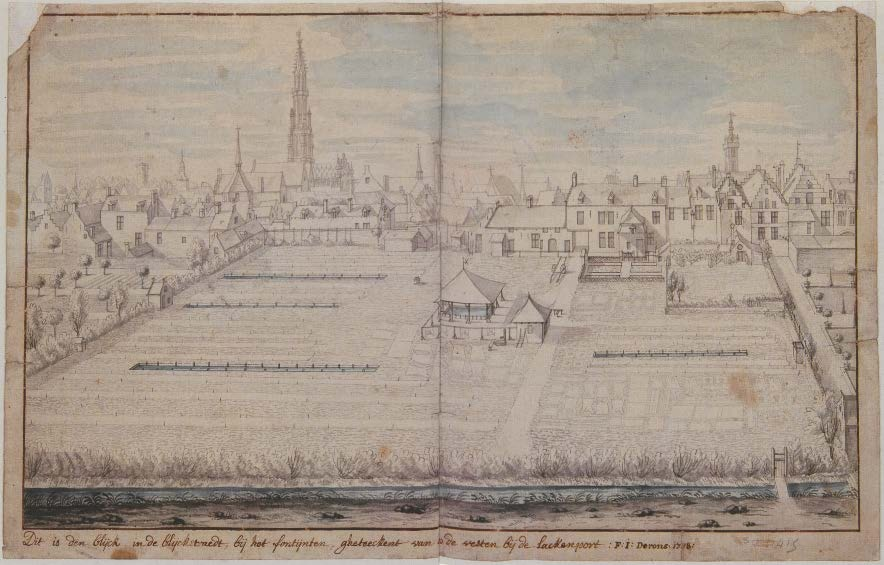
Den Blijck, a bleachfield in Brussels, drawing by Derons, 1748

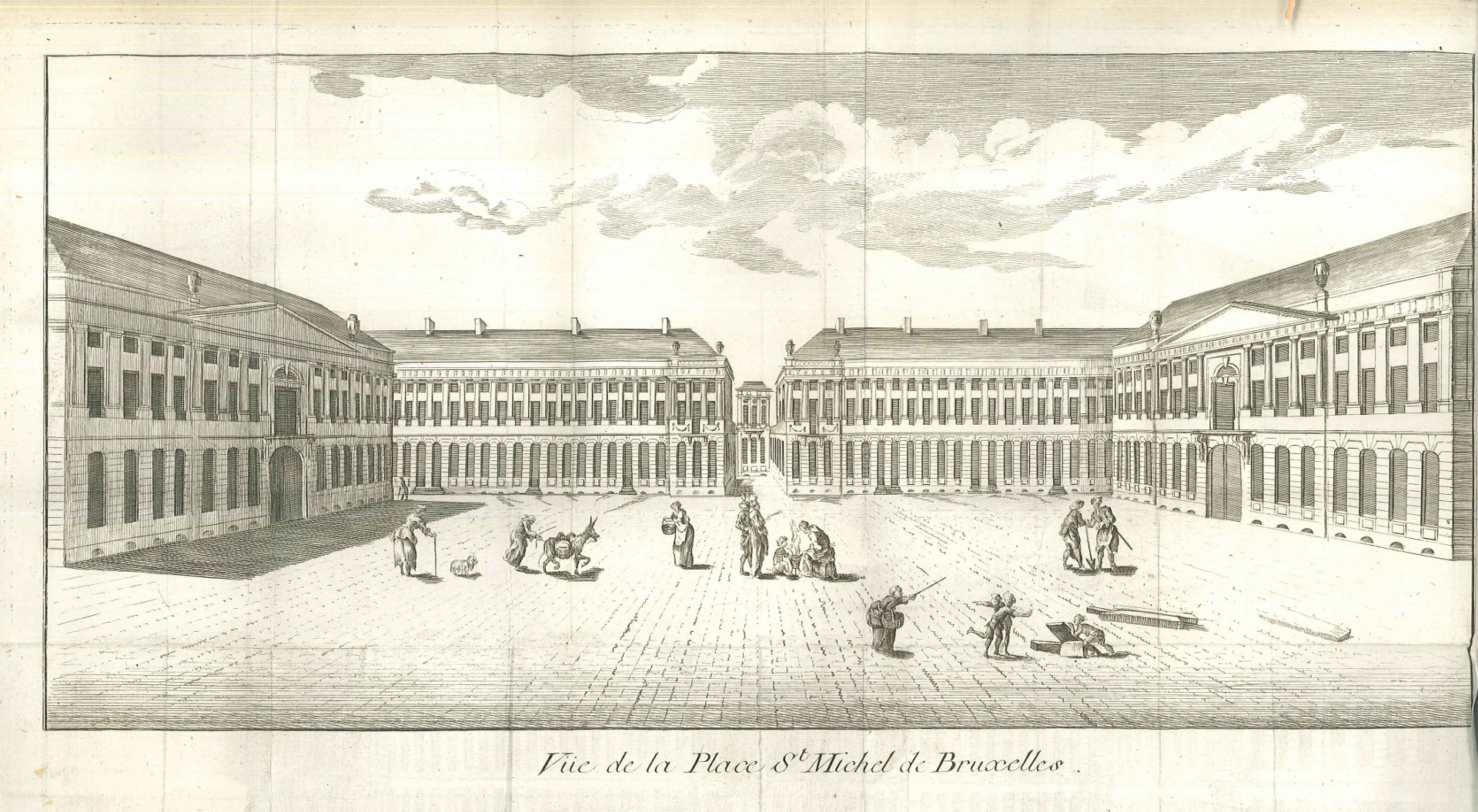
The Place Saint-Michel/Sint-Michielsplein from Description de la ville de Bruxelles enrichie du plan de la ville et de perspectives, 1782

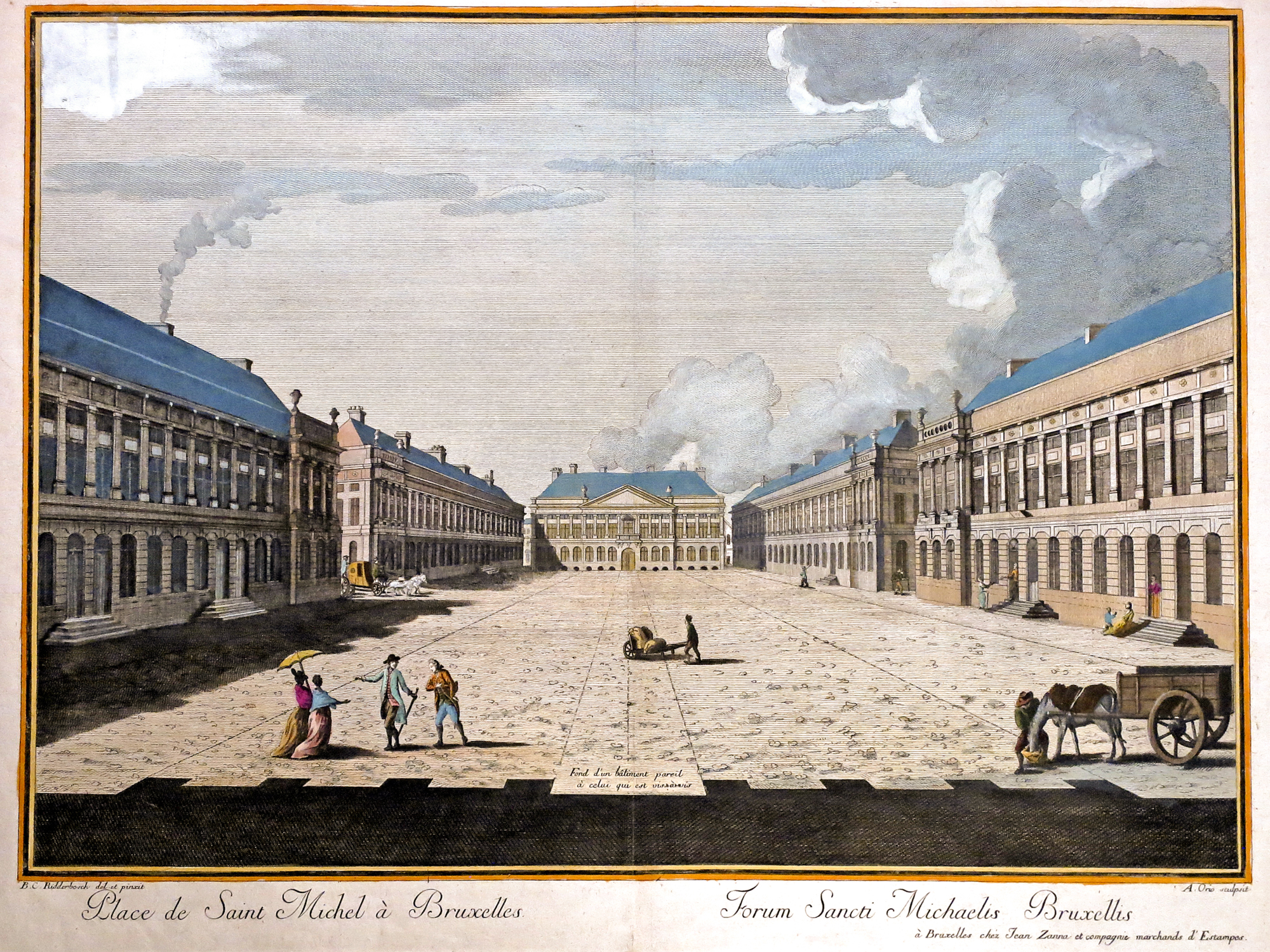
The Place Saint-Michel, aquarelled engraving by Ambroise Orio after a drawing by Bernard Ridderbosch, 1783

=== Later development ===
The square's layout was modified several times over the centuries. Originally, it was a paved and "empty" square, as seen in engravings from the late 18th century. In 1802, linden trees were planted in its centre. In 1830, after the first victims of the Belgian Revolution had been buried there, the Provisional Government decided, in 1831, to turn the square into a national commemoration place for the victims of the Revolution. The Monument to the Martyrs of the 1830 Revolution, also known as the Pro Patria Monument, was erected in 1836–1838. Carved by the court sculptor of King Leopold I, Guillaume Geefs, it includes a statue and crypt.

The construction of the Pro Patria Monument led to a radical alteration of the square by eliminating the perspective of the Rue Saint-Michel/Sint-Michielsstraat towards the Rue du Persil/Peterseliestraat. According to the historian Guillaume Des Marez, the statue is "undeniably too large in size and harms the primitive design of the work". In 1839, the addition of two small fenced flowerbeds surrounded by lampposts on both sides of the monument changed the square's appearance once again, as did the installation of fountains in 1841, which were replaced by pools in 1861. In 1897–98, two smaller monuments were erected there, one in honour of the actor and poet Jenneval, and the other of Count Frédéric de Mérode.

In the following years, political demonstrations were occasionally held on the square. On 23 September 1884, 3000 socialists disrupted a national commemoration there by singing The Marseillaise and The Carmagnole. The leaders of the demonstration, Jean Volders and Louis Bertrand, were arrested. During the First World War, traditional celebrations were banned, but the population spontaneously gathered on the square to openly protest against the German occupation.

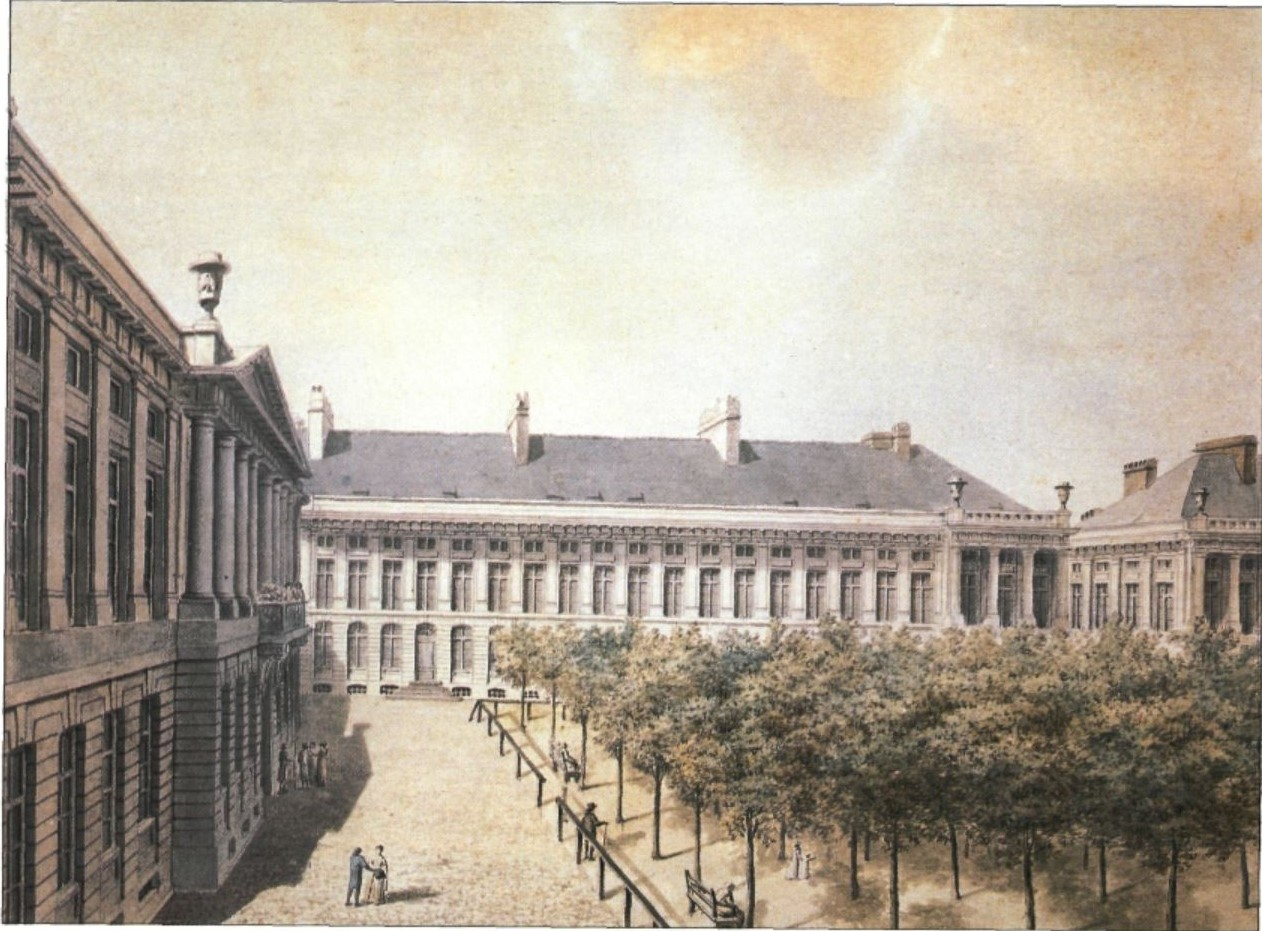
The Place des Martyrs/Martelaarsplein covered in linden trees, c. 1810

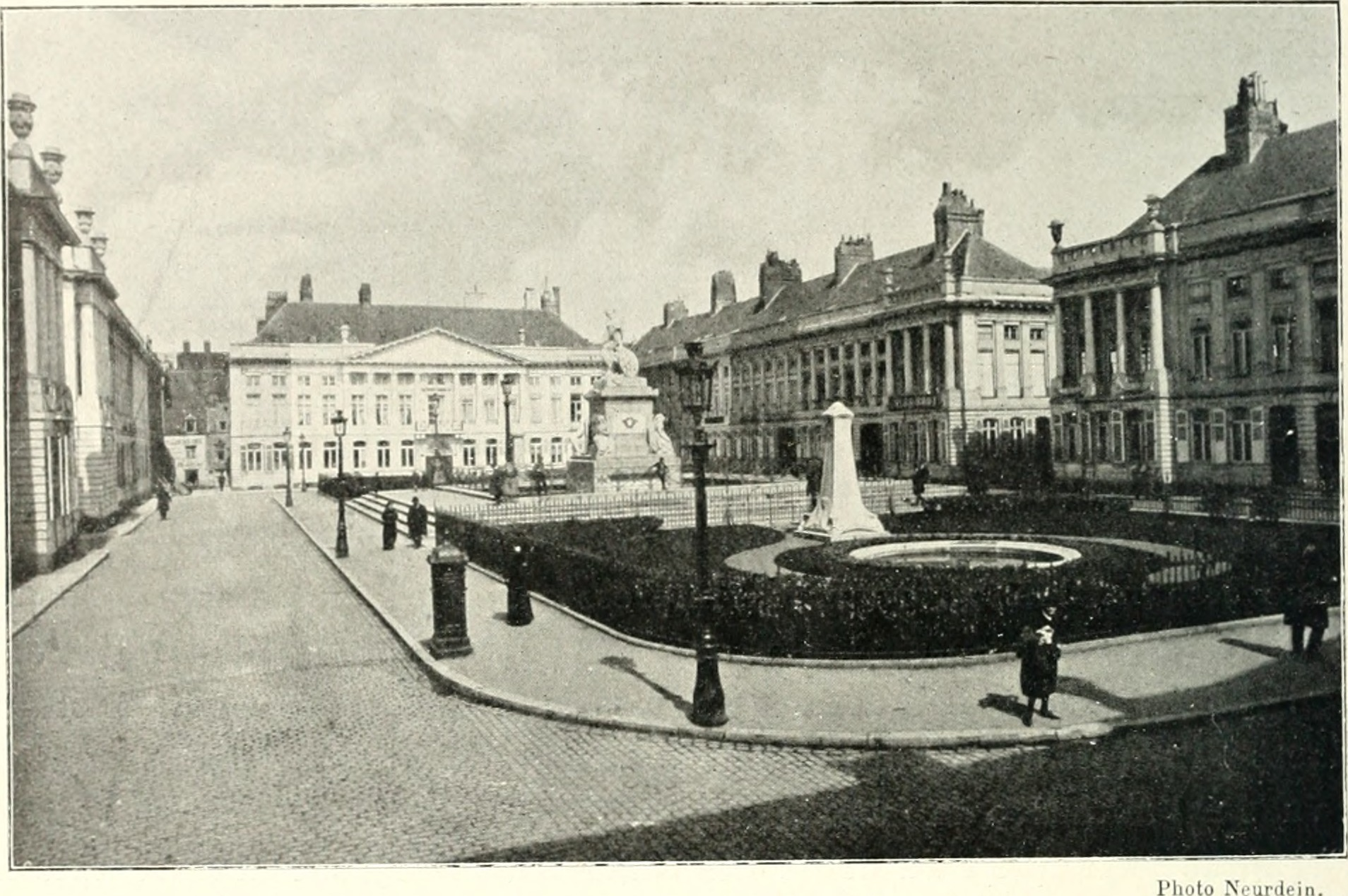
The square, c. 1910. Note the gardens and pools on both sides of the monument.

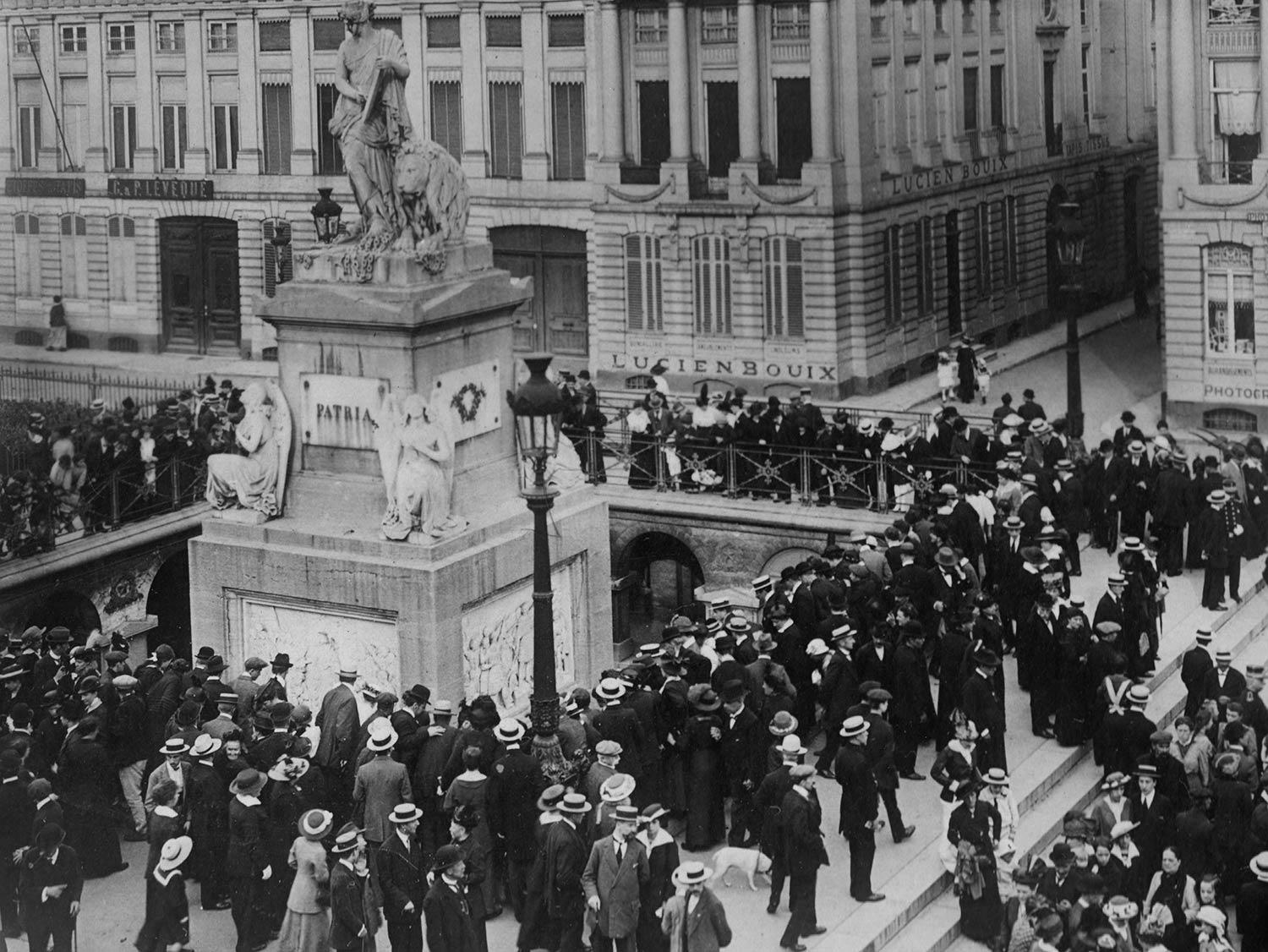
Civilians gather on the square on the first National Day under the German occupation, 21 July 1915

=== Contemporary (1945–present) ===
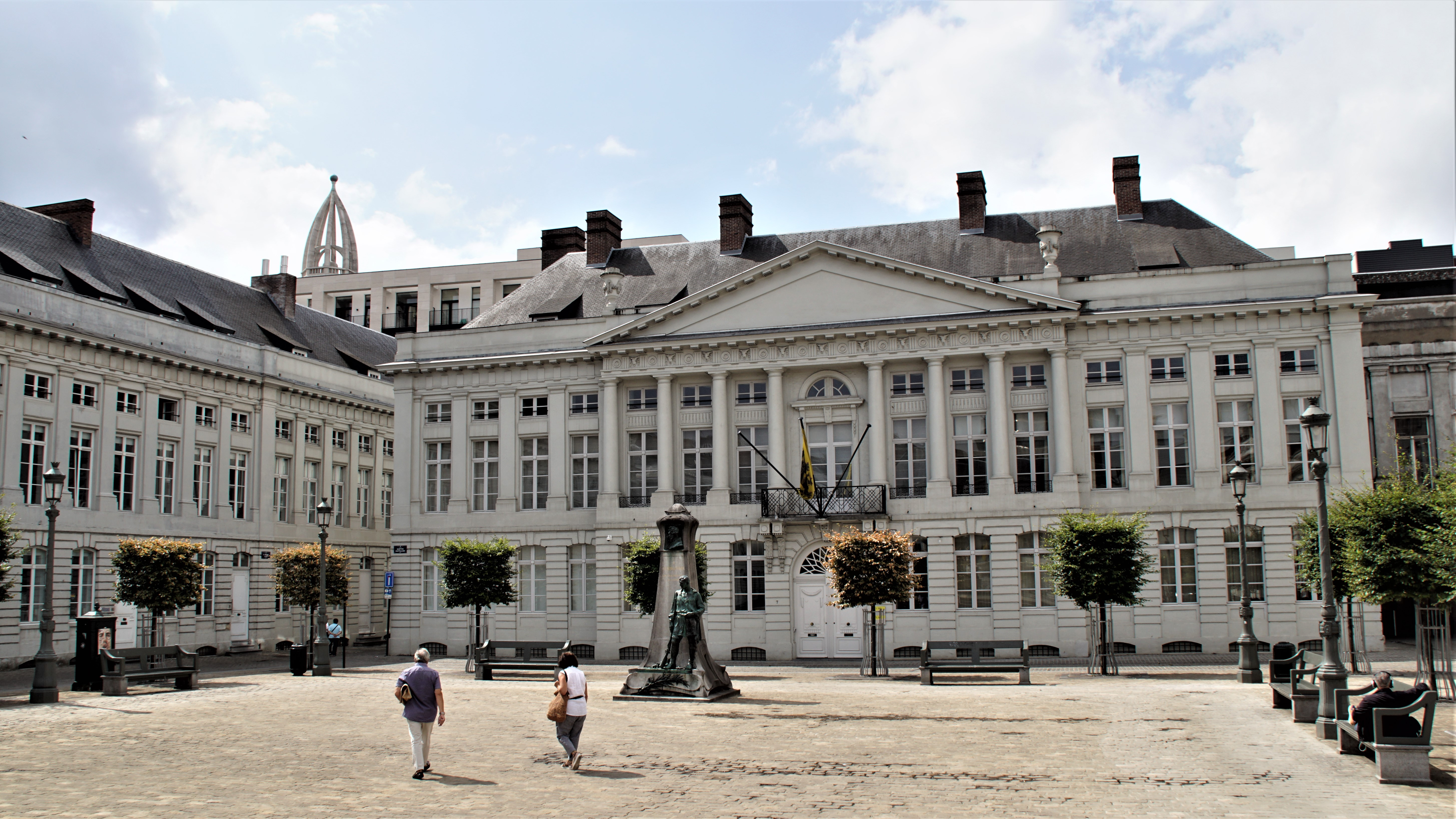
The cabinet offices of the Flemish Minister-President on the square

The Place des Martyrs, including the façades and roofs of the buildings, as well as the Pro Patria Monument, received protected status through a royal decree issued on 10 June 1963. In 1979–80, the square was partially restored to its original appearance and was repaved. On that occasion, the monuments to Jennevel and to the Count de Mérode were moved further north and south, respectively. The redevelopment also included the replacement of the flowerbeds with new paving and the installation of bollards, public benches and lampposts.

In recent years, several cabinet offices of the Flemish Government, including those of the Flemish Minister-President set up residence on the Place des Martyrs. In 1998, a theatre, the Théâtre des Martyrs, was inaugurated. Nowadays, the square is also home to two bookshops, a youth hostel and a five-star hotel in the buildings at the corner of the Rue Saint-Michel. There is also a masonic temple nearby on the Rue du Persil.

== Layout ==
The Place des Martyrs has a sober and severe appearance, characteristic of neoclassical architecture. It is modelled after the so-called French royal square, as developed at the end of the 17th century. It has a double symmetry, which is best perceived when approaching it from the Rue Saint-Michel. It is divided by two axes, one of which passes through the centre of the long sides, from the Rue Saint-Michel to the Rue du Persil, while the other passes through the centre of the pediments of the short sides.

As is the case for the Place Royale/Koningsplein and the buildings along Brussels Park, the plots of the Place des Martyrs had been encumbered with an architectural servitude testifying to the concern of the authorities to build and preserve a homogeneous ensemble. This homogeneity is achieved in particular by requiring the owners to coat and paint the façades in ash grey and the doors and windows in pearl grey.

The layout of the façades is also uniform: the ground floor has partitions, the depth of which is equal to half that of the incisions, which underline the horizontality of the ensemble. The windows have arched bays. Between the ground floor and the first floor runs a continuous stylobate. The ground floor supports pilasters over a floor and a half. The whole is surmounted by a frieze with triglyphs and metopes and crowned with an attic. The façades have a continuous gable roof.

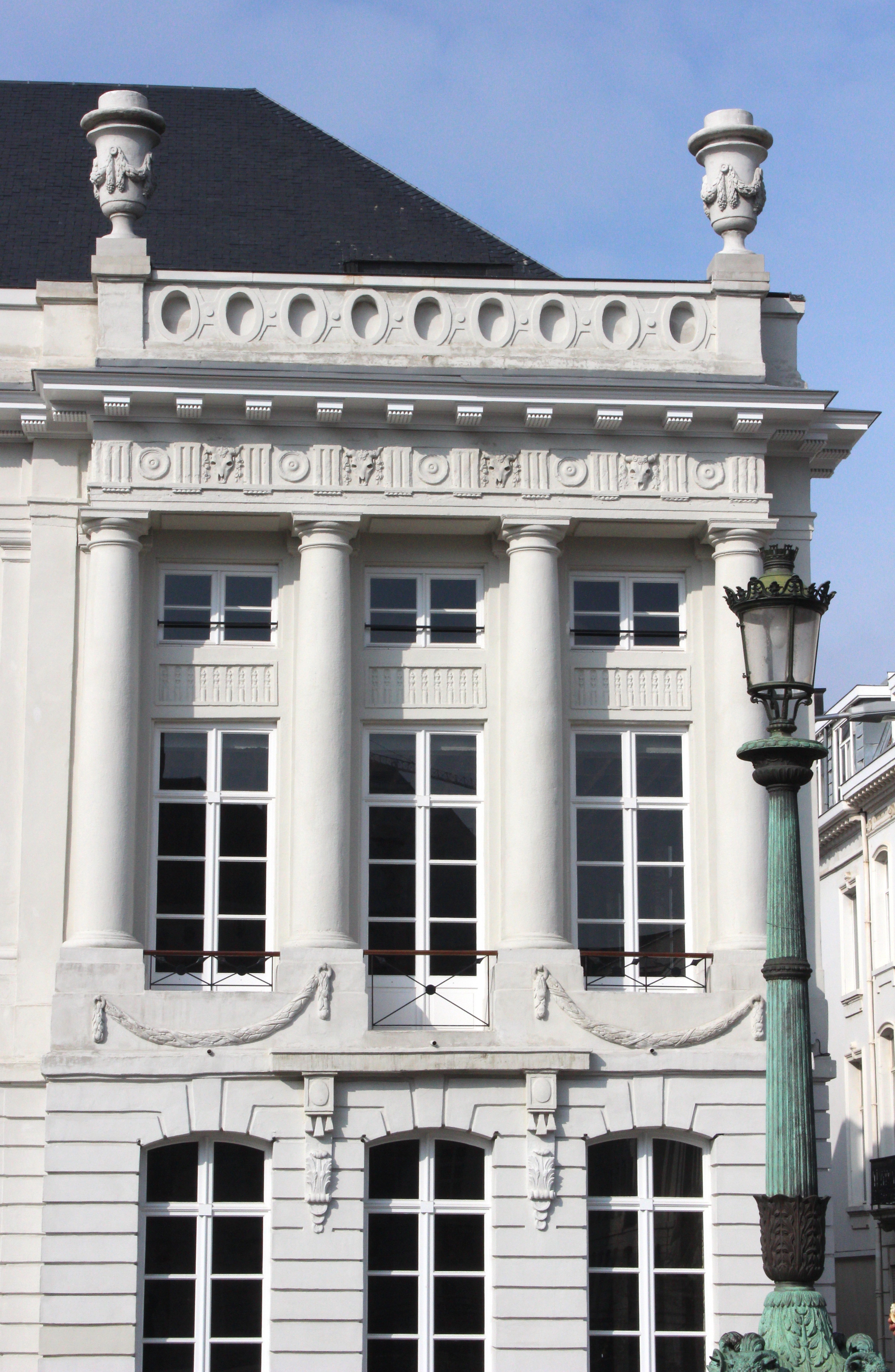
Avant-corps of a corner building towards the Rue Saint-Michel

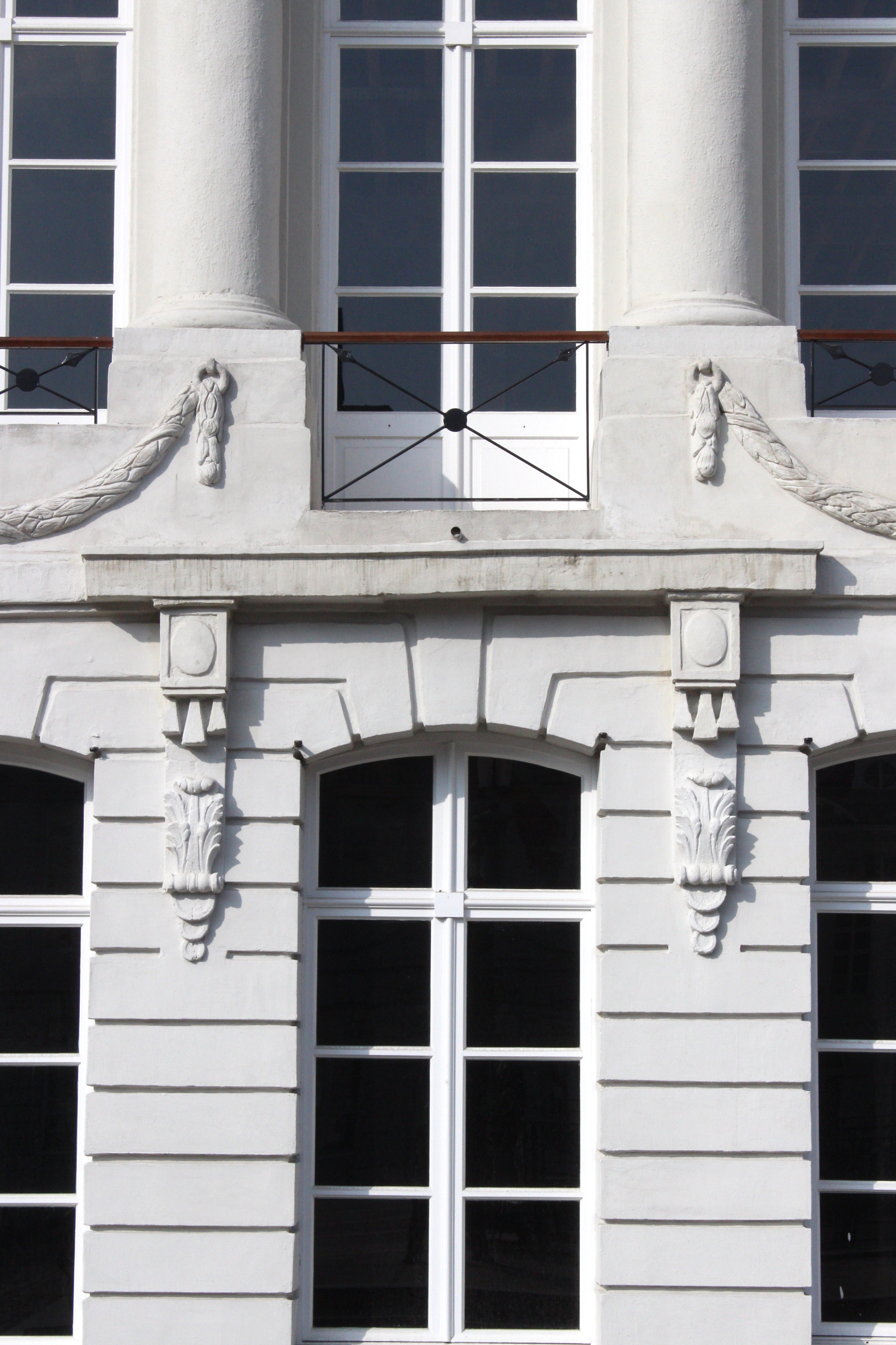
Balcony resting on brackets and surrounded by festoons

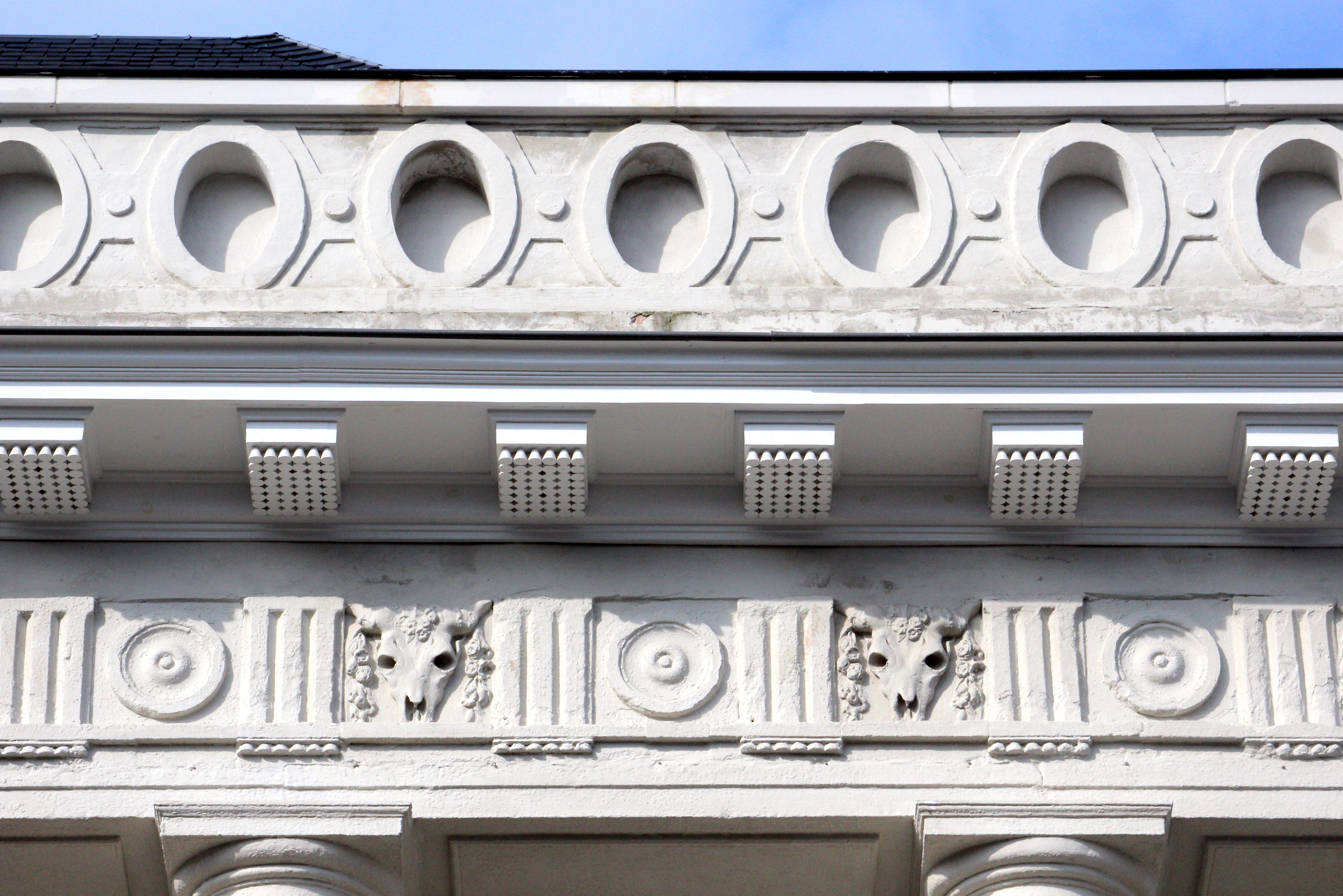
Frieze with triglyphs and metopes surmounted by an openwork attic

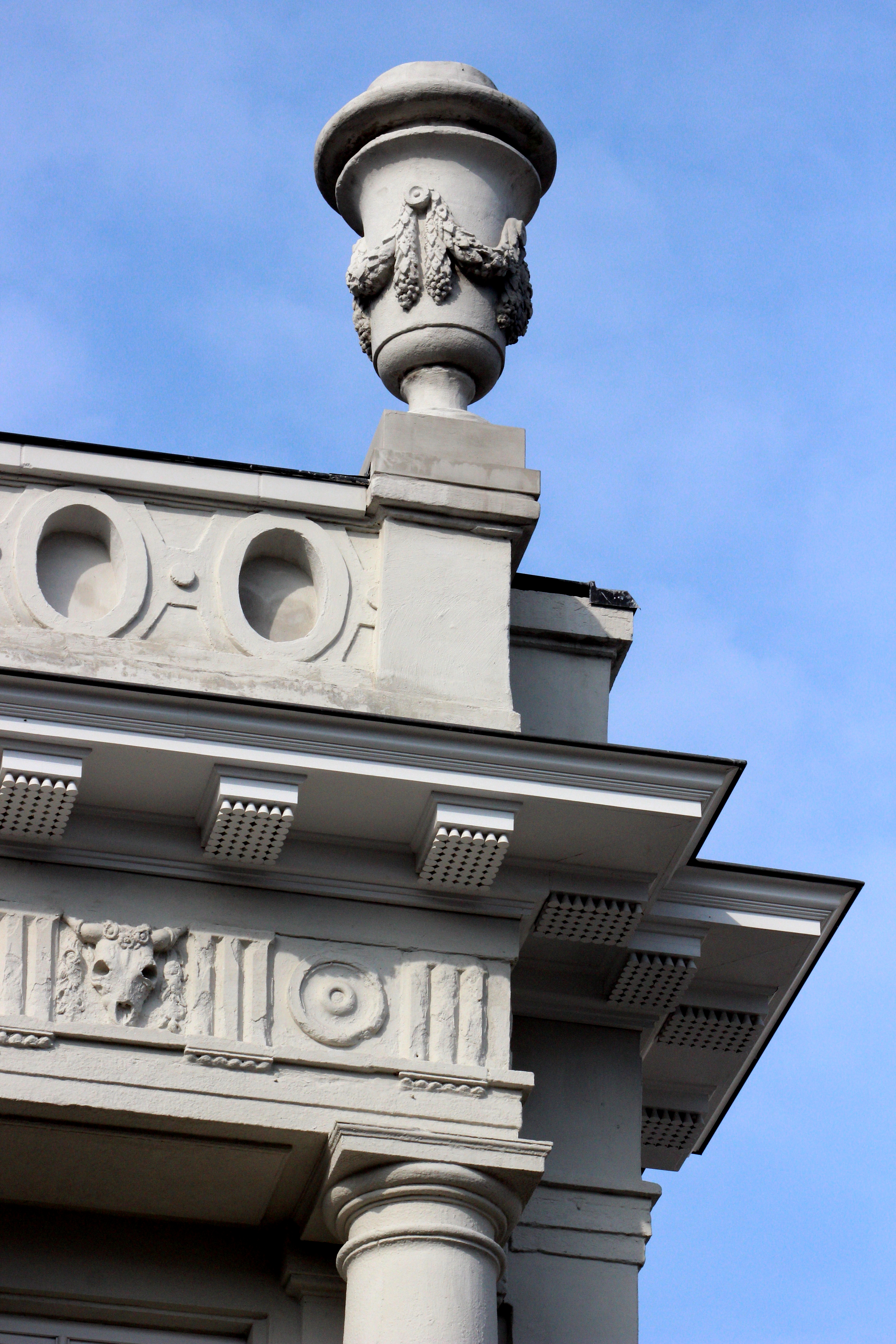
Corner of the avant-corps surmounted by a frieze, an attic and a vase

== Monuments ==
Several commemorative monuments are located on the Place des Martyrs:

- the Monument to the Martyrs of the 1830 Revolution or Pro Patria Monument, commemorating the victims of the Belgian Revolution, by Guillaume Geefs and Louis Roelandt (1836–1838)
- the Monument to Jenneval, honouring Alexandre Dechet (commonly known as Jenneval), the author of the text of The Brabançonne (Belgium's national anthem) by Alfred Crick and Émile Anciaux (1897)
- the Monument to Count Frédéric de Mérode, in Art Nouveau style, dedicated to Count Frédéric de Mérode, by Paul Du Bois and Henry Van de Velde (1898)
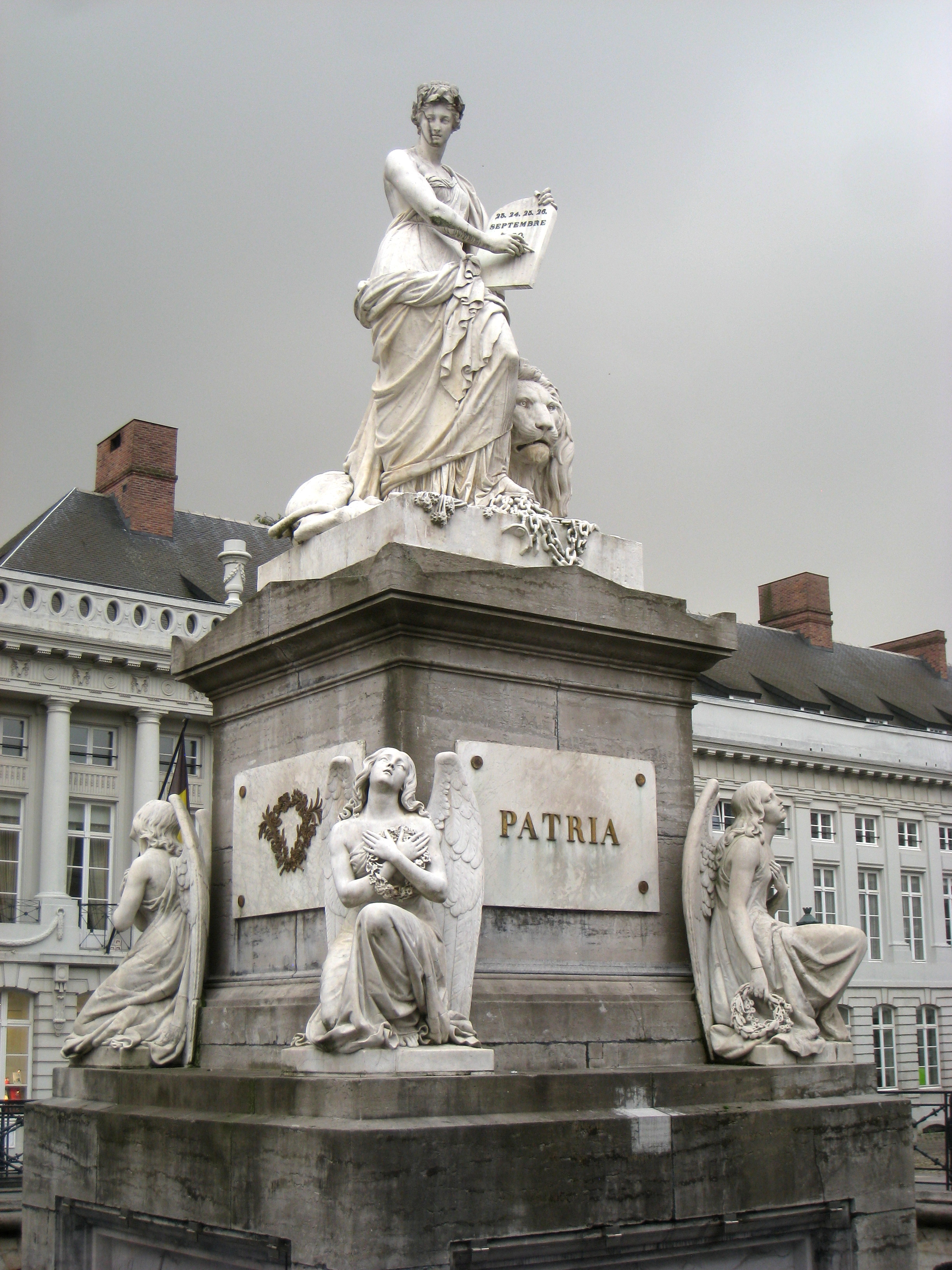
Monument to the Martyrs of the 1830 Revolution (Geefs, 1836–1838)

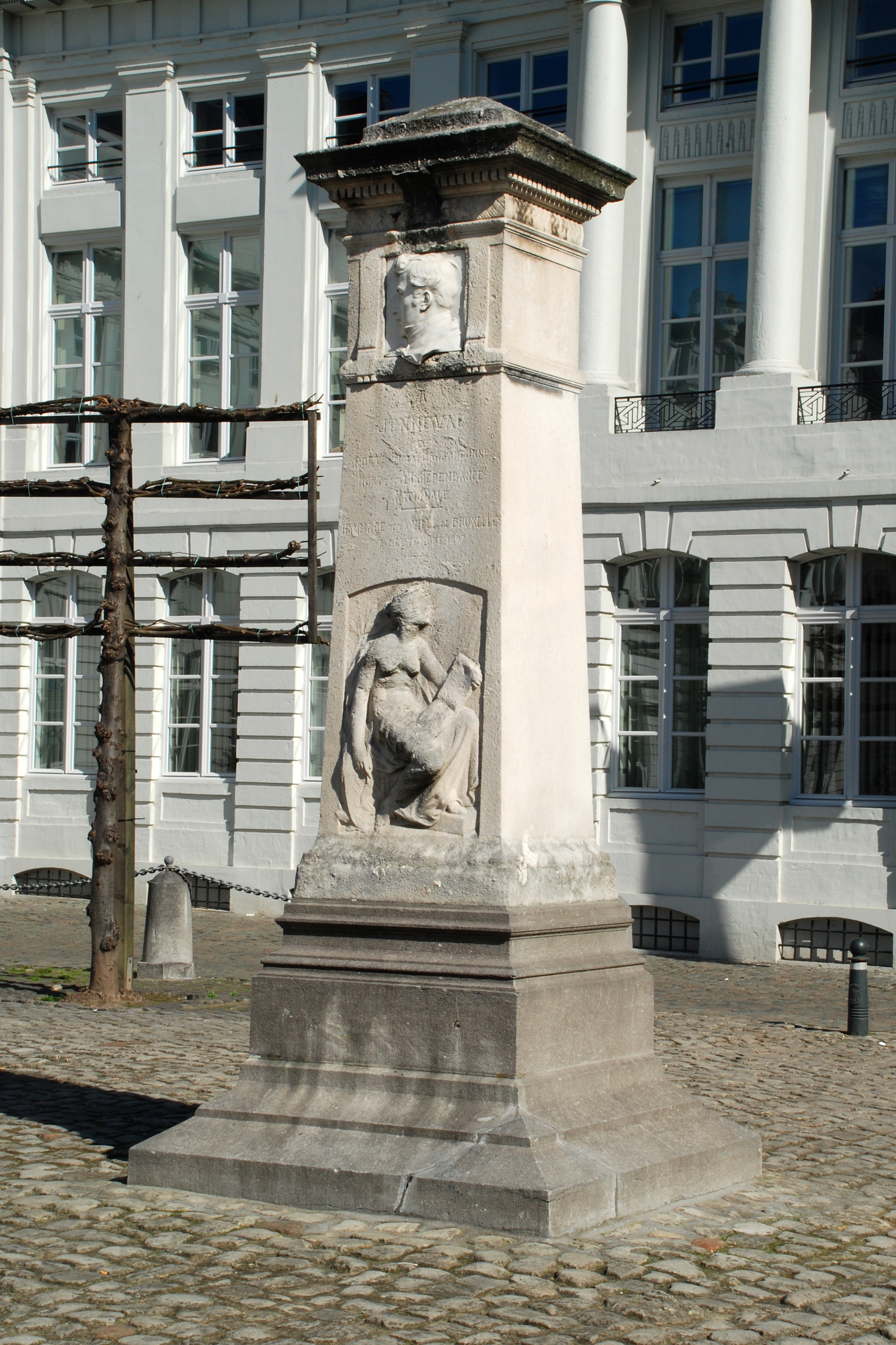
Monument to Jenneval (Crick and Anciaux, 1897)

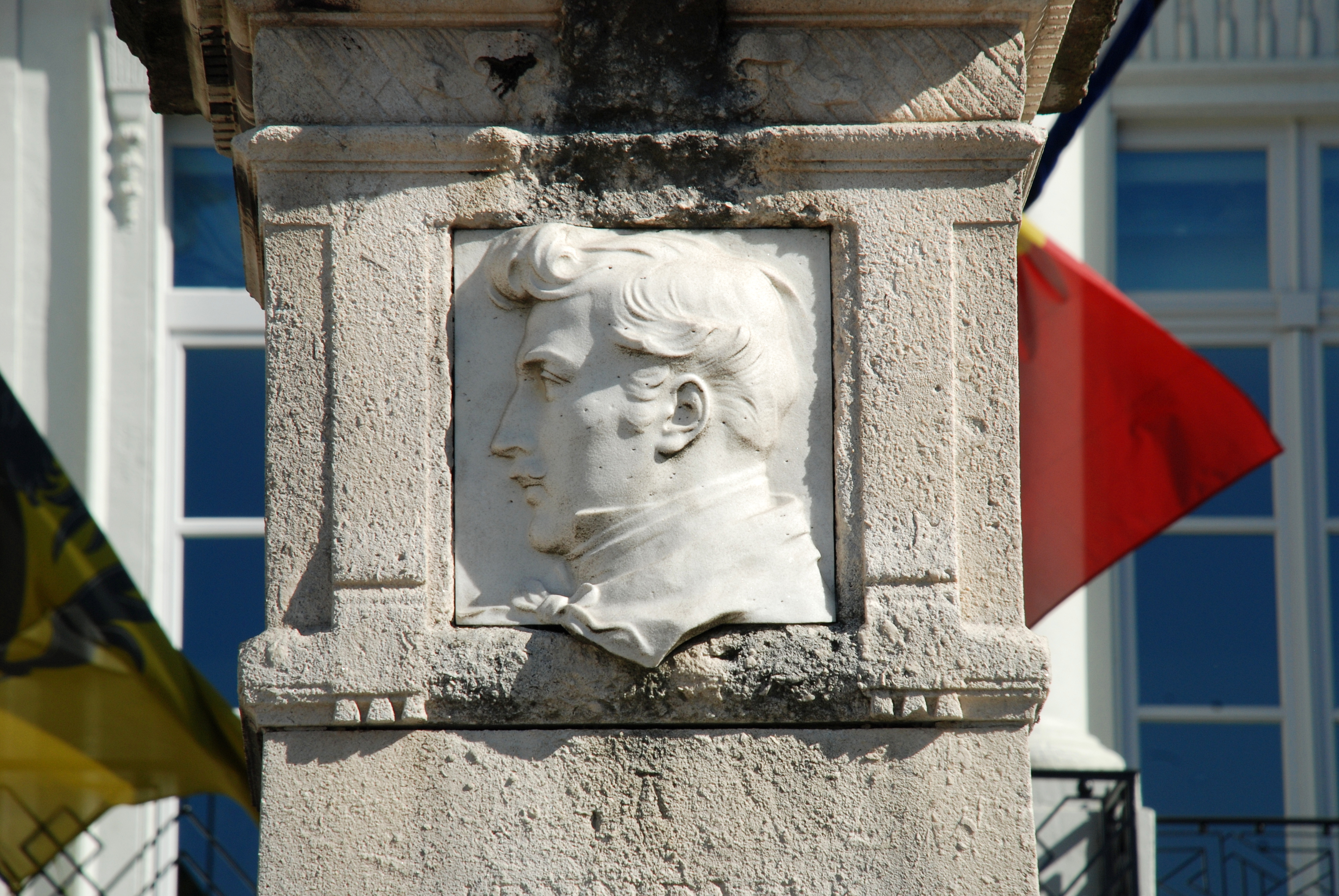
Closeup of white marble plaque with the effigy of Jenneval

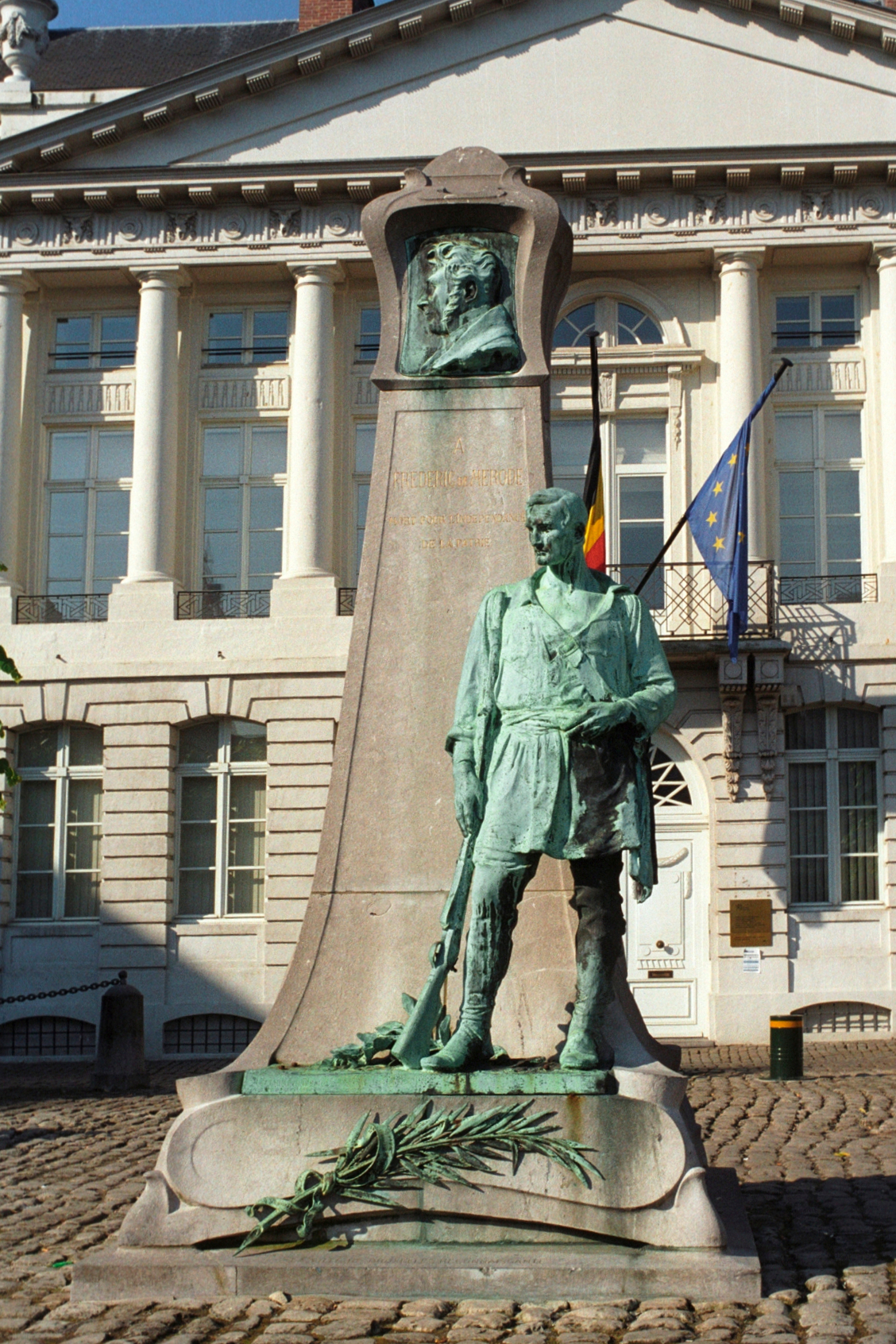
Monument to Count Frédéric de Mérode (Du Bois and Van de Velde, 1898)

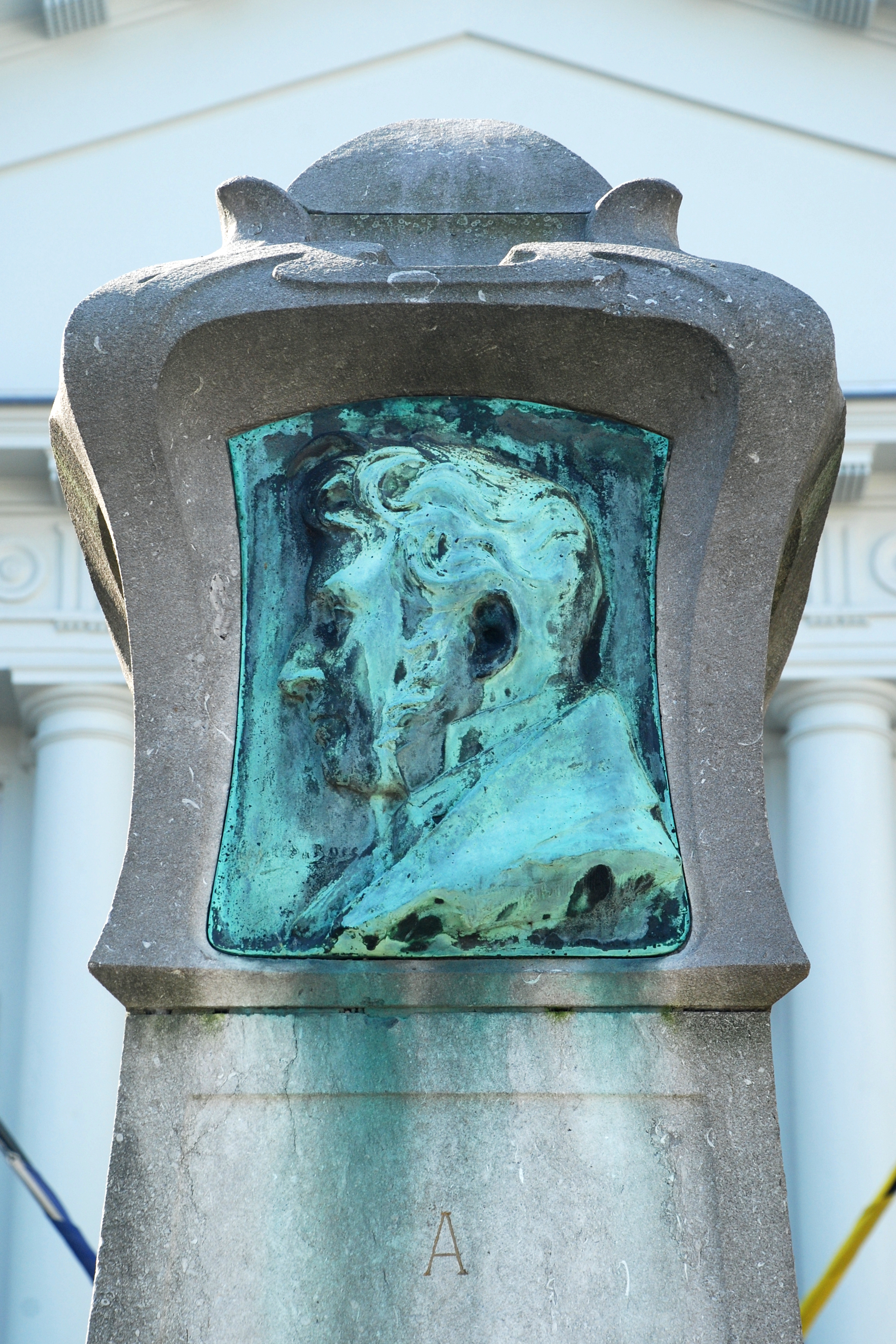
Closeup of the bronze medallion bearing Frédéric de Mérode's image

== See also ==
- Neoclassical architecture in Belgium
- Art Nouveau in Brussels
- History of Brussels
- Belgium in the long nineteenth century
