= Louis-Hippolyte =

Louis-Hippolyte may refer to:

- Joseph Louis Hippolyte Bellangé (1800–1866), French painter
- Louis-Hippolyte Boileau (1878–1948), French architect
- Louis Hippolyte Bouteille (1804–1881), French ornithologist
- Louis Hippolyte Gache, 19th century pastor of the Holy Trinity Catholic Church (Washington, D.C.)
- Louis-Hippolyte Lafontaine (1807–1864), Canadian politician
- Louis-Hippolyte Lebas (1782–1867), French architect
- Louis Hippolyte Leroy (1763–1829), French fashion merchant
- Louis Hippolyte de Lormel (1808–1888), French colonial administrator
- François Louis Hippolyte Monpou (1804–1841), French musician
- Louis Hippolyte Marie Nouet (1884–1933), French colonial administrator

== See also ==
- Louise-Hippolyte Grimaldi (1697–1731), Louise Hippolyte of the House of Grimaldi, Princess of Monaco
- Hippolyte-Louis (given name)
- Hippolyte (name)
- Louis (name)
- Louis (disambiguation)
- Hippolyte (disambiguation)
