= Saint-Hippolyte =

Saint-Hippolyte may refer to:

== Canada ==
- Saint-Hippolyte, Quebec

== France ==
- Saint-Hippolyte, Aveyron
- Saint-Hippolyte, Cantal
- Saint-Hippolyte, Charente-Maritime
- Saint-Hippolyte, Doubs
- Saint-Hippolyte, Gironde
- Saint-Hippolyte, Indre-et-Loire
- Saint-Hippolyte, Pyrénées-Orientales
- Saint-Hippolyte, Haut-Rhin
- Saint-Hippolyte-de-Caton
- Saint-Hippolyte-de-Montaigu
- Saint-Hippolyte-du-Fort
- Saint-Hippolyte-le-Graveyron

== See also ==
- Saint Hippolytus
- Hippolyte (disambiguation)
- St Ippolyts
