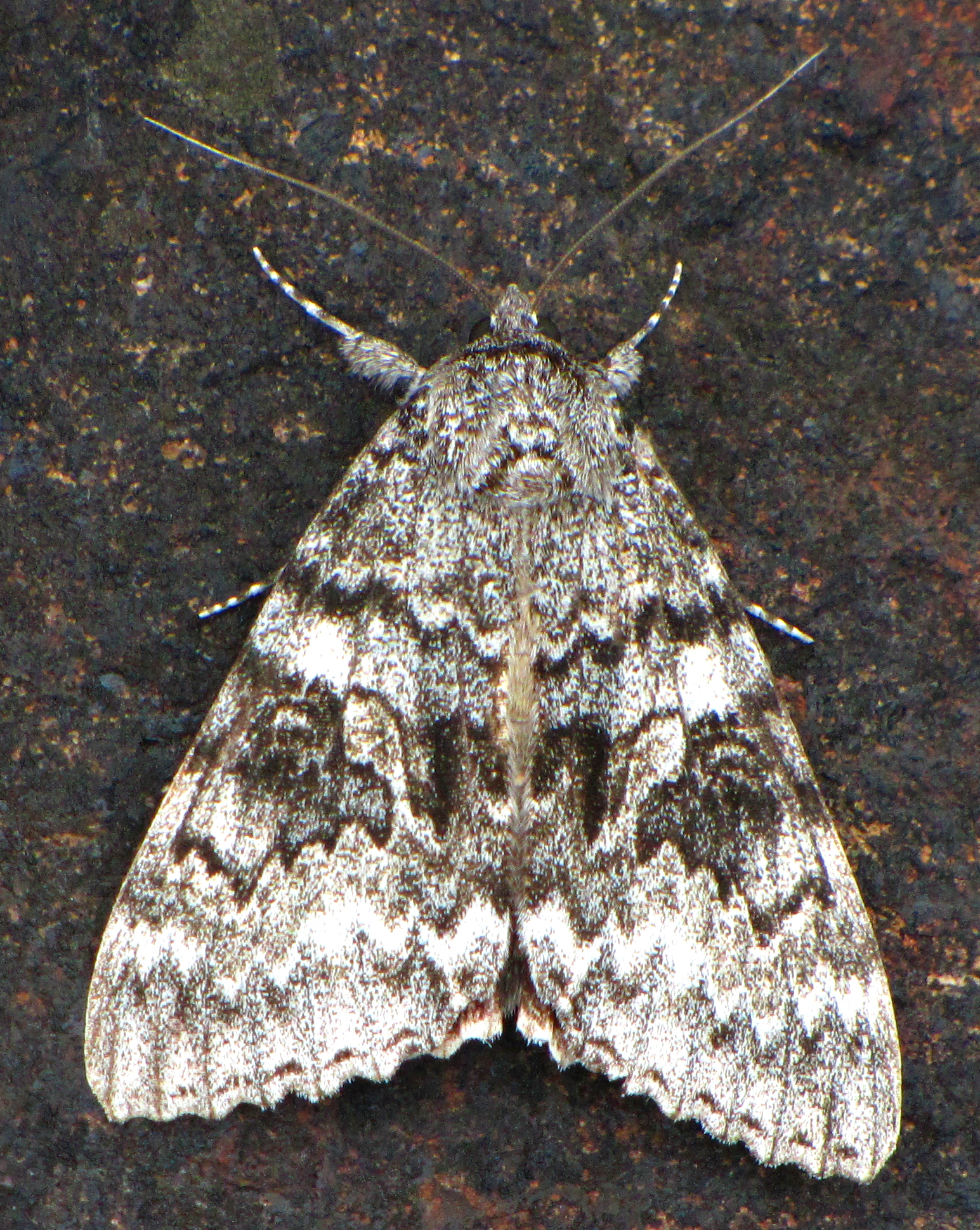
- Ottawa, Ontario

Scientific classification
- Kingdom: Animalia
- Phylum: Arthropoda
- Class: Insecta
- Order: Lepidoptera
- Superfamily: Noctuoidea
- Family: Erebidae
- Genus: Catocala
- Species: C. semirelicta

Binomial name
- Catocala semirelicta Grote, 1874

Synonyms
- Catocala atala Cassino, 1918; Catocala pura Hulst, 1880 110; Catocala pura f. nigra Eastman, 1916; Catocala nevadensis Beutenmüller, 1907; Catocala nevadensis var. montana

= Catocala semirelicta =

Semirelict underwing

Species of moth

Catocala semirelicta, the semirelict underwing, is a moth of the family Erebidae. The species was first described by Augustus Radcliffe Grote in 1874. It is found in North America from Nevada, Colorado, Utah, California, and Nova Scotia south to Maine, west across Canada to British Columbia, and southward in the mountains.

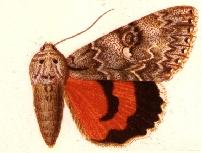
Illustration

The length of the forewings is about 30 mm. The wingspan is 65–75 mm.

Adults are on wing from July to September in one generation depending on the location. The larvae feed on Populus balsamifera, Populus tremuloides, and Salix species. There is probably one generation per year.

== Subspecies ==
- Catocala semirelicta semirelicta Grote, 1874
- Catocala semirelicta hippolyta Strecker, 1874

The latter is sometimes considered a distinct species.
