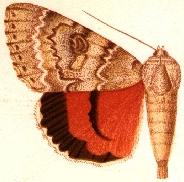

Scientific classification
- Kingdom: Animalia
- Phylum: Arthropoda
- Class: Insecta
- Order: Lepidoptera
- Superfamily: Noctuoidea
- Family: Erebidae
- Genus: Catocala
- Species: C. semirelicta
- Subspecies: C. s. hippolyta

Trinomial name
- Catocala semirelicta hippolyta Strecker, 1874

Synonyms
- Catocala hypolita var. walteri Schwarz, 1923

= Catocala semirelicta hippolyta =

Subspecies of moth

Catocala semirelicta hippolyta is a subspecies of moth of the family Erebidae first described by Strecker in 1874. It is found in the US state of California.

The wingspan is 72–76 mm. Adults are on wing from June to October depending on the location. There is one generation per year.

The larvae feed on Populus species.
