= Hippolyte (disambiguation) =

Hippolyte or Hippolyta was a queen of the Amazons in Greek mythology.

Hippolyte or Hippolyta may also refer to:

- Hippolyte (name), including a list of people and fictional characters with the name, or variant spellings of the name
- Hippolyte (mythology), a list of other mythological characters
- 10295 Hippolyta, a minor planet
- Hippolyte (crustacean), a genus of shrimp
- "Hippolyte", a song by Andreas Vollenweider from the 1989 album Dancing with the Lion
- Dorothea Jordan as Hippolyta, 1791 painting by John Hoppner
- Hippolyta (DC Comics), a DC comic book superhero.

== See also ==
- Hippolytus (disambiguation)
- Hyppolite (disambiguation)
- Saint-Hippolyte (disambiguation)
- Catocala semirelicta hippolyta, a moth subspecies
- Hippolyte Rocks, an island off Tasmania, Australia
