= Alexandre Dechet =

French actor and lyricist (1801–1830)

Alexandre Dechet Jenneval
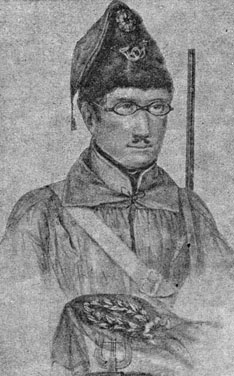
- Sketch of Jenneval

Background information
- Also known as: Jenneval
- Born: Hyppolyte Louis-Alexandre Dechet; 20 January 1801; Lyon, French First Empire
- Died: 18 October 1830 (aged 29) Boechout, Belgium
- Occupation: Poet

(Hyppolyte) Louis Alexandre Dechet (alternatively, spelled Dechez; 20 January 1801 in Lyon – 18 October 1830 in Boechout) was a French actor and is regarded the author of the lyrics of Brabançonne, the Belgian national anthem. His pseudonym was Jenneval, possibly named after the drama Jenneval, ou le Barnevelt français (1769) of Louis Sébastien Mercier.

Dechet worked in Ajaccio, Marseille and in 1826 at the Paris Odéon. Via Lille he finally came to Brussels, where he played at La Monnaie. In 1828 he returned to Paris in order to work at the Comédie Française, but returned to Brussels immediately after the July Revolution in 1830. He there served with the city guard which was responsible for maintaining law and order.

Dechet is said to have written the text of La Brabançonne during the first revolutionary gatherings at the café "L'Aigle d'Or" in the Brussels Greepstraat in August 1830, shortly after the performance of the opera La Muette de Portici, which triggered the Belgian revolution.

During the Belgian Revolution Dechet became a volunteer in the revolutionary army and joined the corps of Frenchman Charles Niellon. He died during a combat against the Dutch in Boechout.

On the Place des Martyrs/Martelaarsplein in Brussels, a column honouring Dechet is to be found, which was created by the sculptor Alfred Crick and inaugurated in 1897.

== Gallery ==
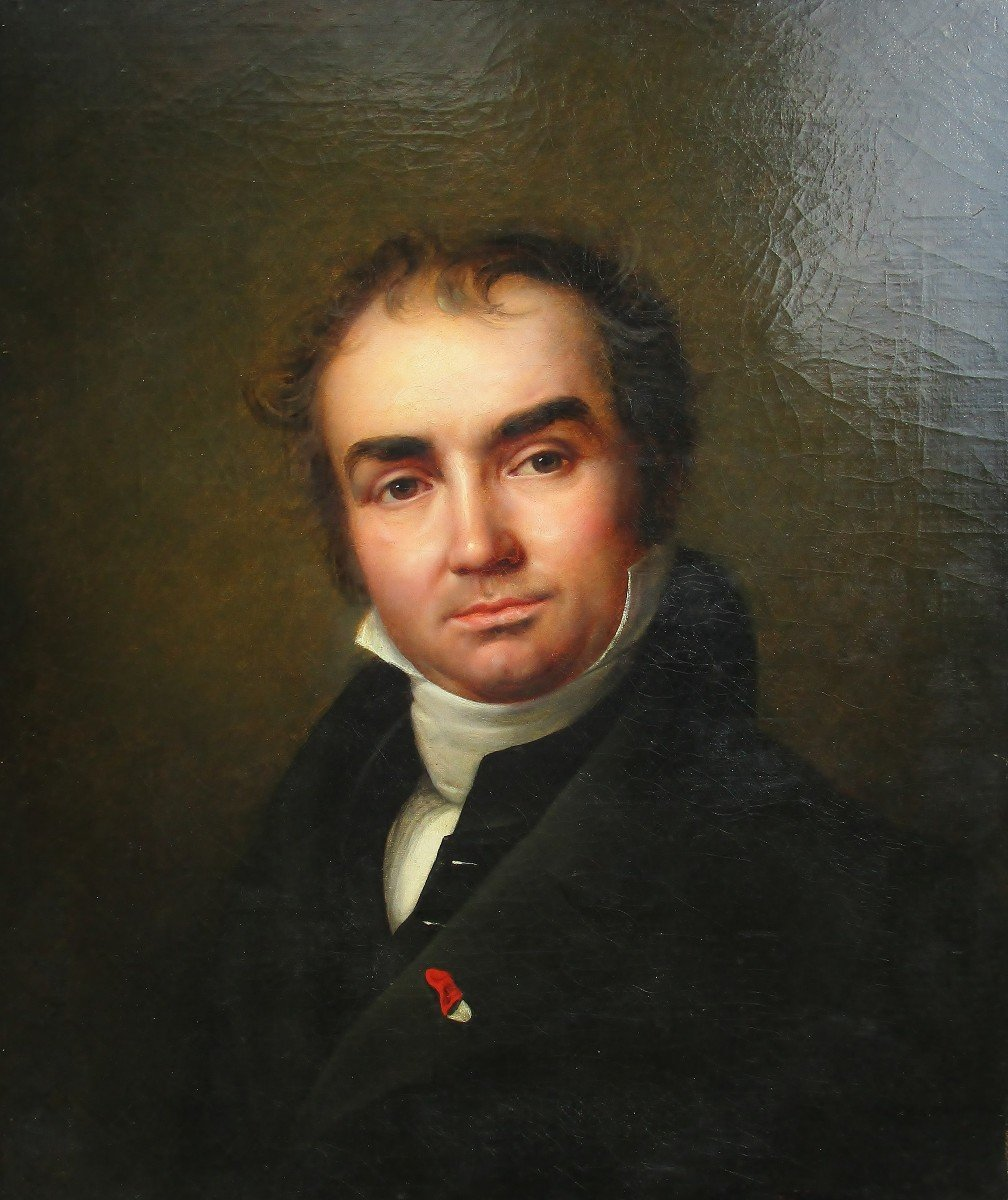
Portrait of Jenneval by Pierre-Louis Delaval, 1821

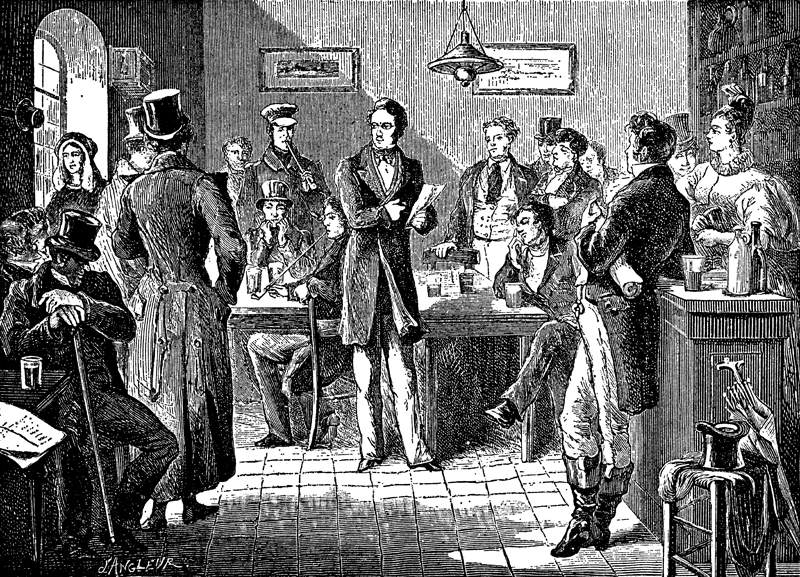
Jenneval declaiming his Brabançonne for the first time

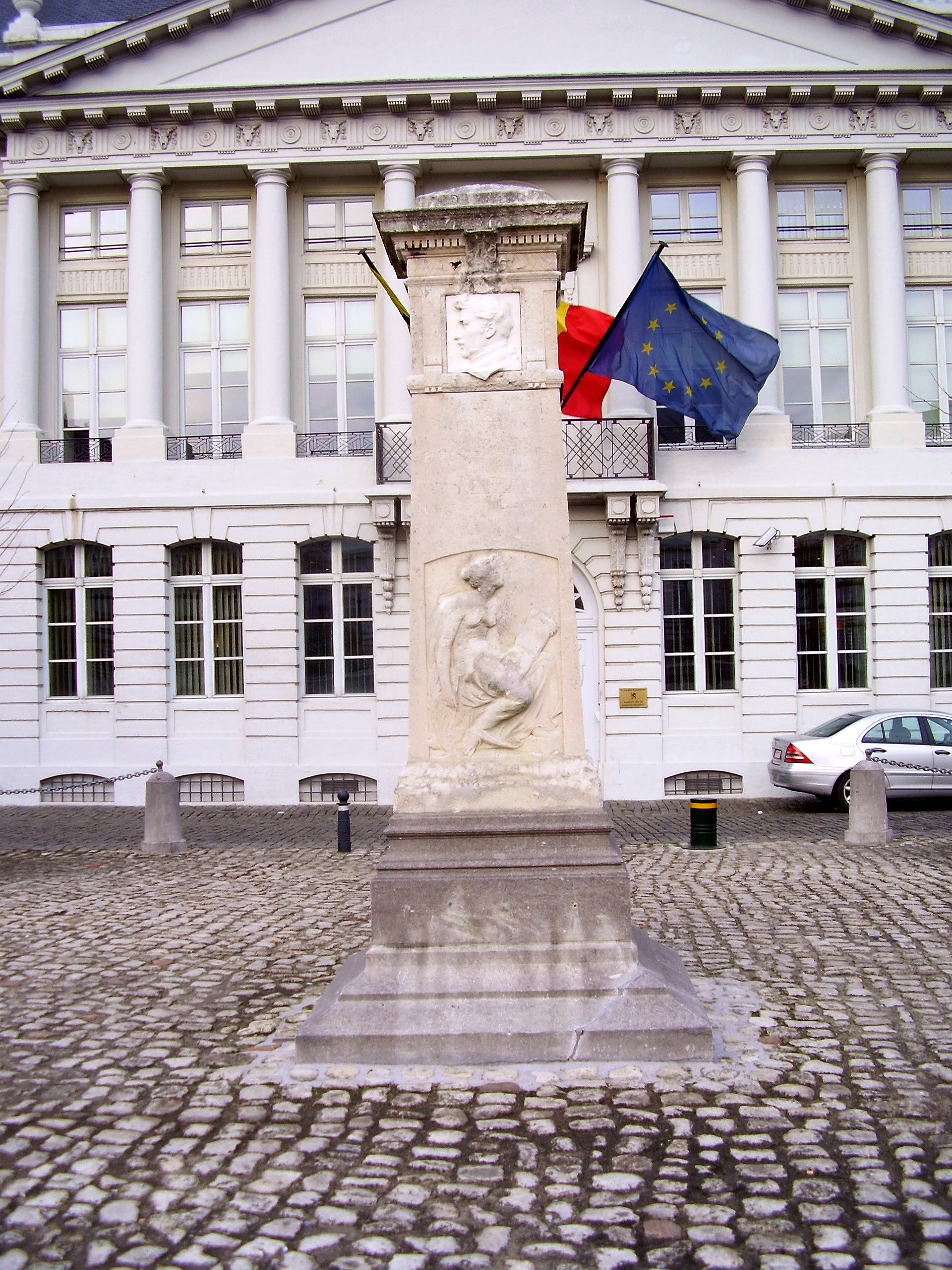
Monument to Jenneval on the Place des Martyrs/Martelaarsplein in Brussels
