= Louis Roelandt =

Belgian architect

- Born: 3 January 1786; Nieuwpoort, Belgium
- Died: 5 April 1864 (aged 78); Ghent, Belgium
- Occupation: Architect
- Buildings: Law Courts of Ghent (Justitiepaleis) Vlaamse Opera in Ghent Aula Magna of the Ghent University

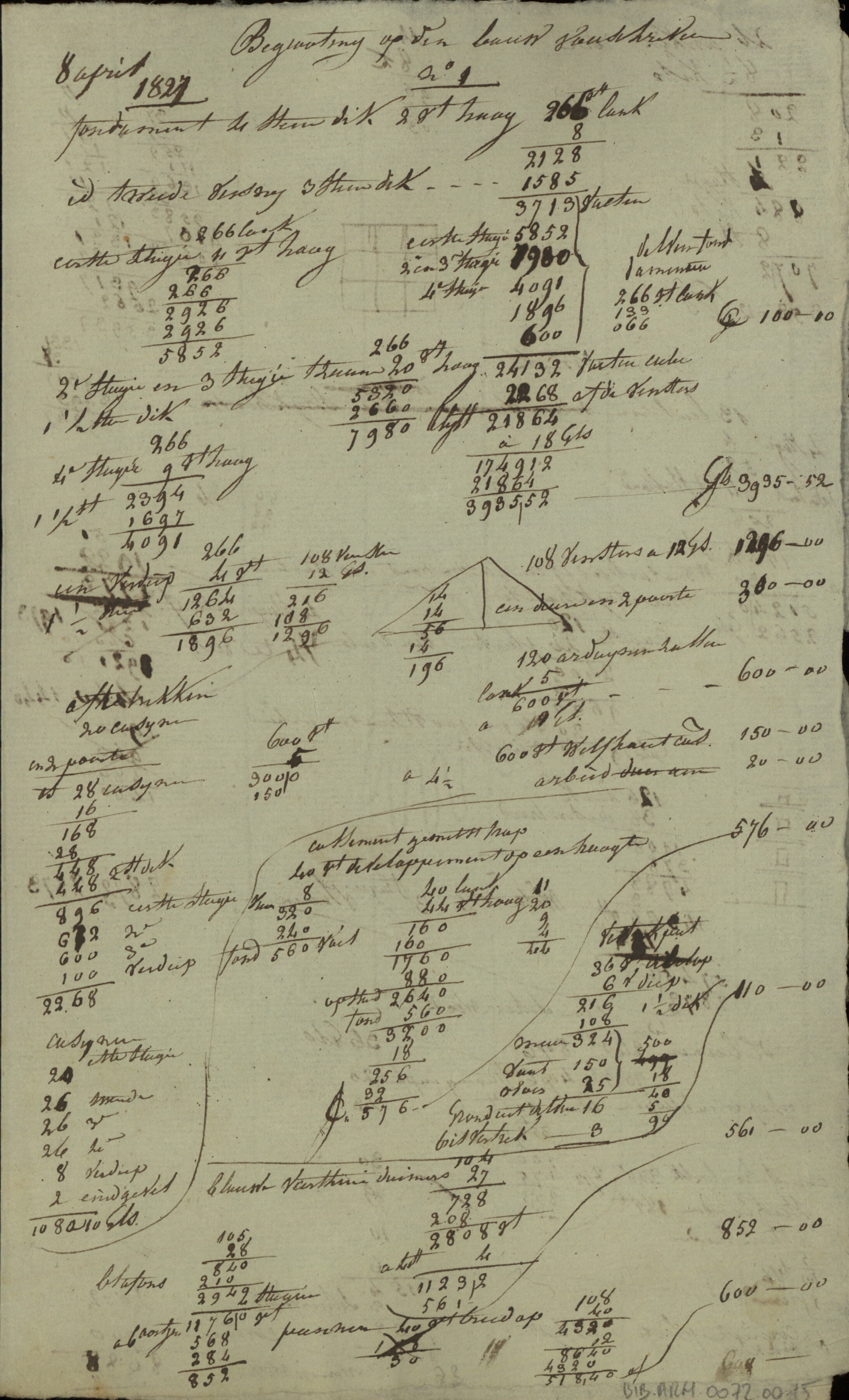
Roelandt's notes, making an estimate of a building. Made on 8 April 1827.

Louis Roelandt or Lodewijk Joseph Adriaan Roelandt (1786-1864) with his full Dutch name, was a Belgian architect that played an important role in the evolution of Neo-Renaissance and Neo-Classical architecture in Belgium.

During the period that Belgium belonged to the First French Empire, Roelandt, who had studied at the Académie of Ghent, was selected to continue his education at the prestigious "Ecole Spéciale d'Architecture" in Paris. Like his compatriot Tilman-François Suys he was a pupil of Charles Percier and Pierre François Léonard Fontaine.

In 1818 he was appointed as architect to the city of Ghent where he would realise the majority of his future projects. Gradually Roelandt moved away from the severe Empire Style in which he had been trained, and introduced more and more Neo-Renaissance and Neo-Baroque features into his designs. He also built churches in an early Gothic Revival style, such as the Sint-Annakerk in Ghent.

Among his most famous students were Louis Delacenserie and Louis van Overstraeten.

The daughter Adèle Sylvie of Lodewijk Roelandt was married to Joseph Geefs, the daughter Mathilde-Jeanne to Louis Van Overstraeten.

== Works ==
- Clubhouse of the "Cercle Liberal", Geraardsbergen, (1812)
- Aula Magna of Ghent University (1819–1826)
- Church, Saint-Aldegondis, in Deurle (1829, design)
- Orangery, Botanical Garden at Baudelo location, Ghent (1829, demolished)
- Town Hall of Aalst (1825–1830)
- "Casino" of the city of Ghent, (1835–1837) (demolished)
- Town Hall of Ninove (1836)
- "Grand Théâtre" in Ghent, (today Vlaamse Opera), a richly decorated complex containing an auditorium, concert hall, ballroom and foyer, (1840).
- Church, Our Lady, Sint-Niklaas (1844, design)
- Ballroom "La Concorde", Ghent, (1844) (demolished)
- Law Courts of Ghent (Justitiepaleis) (1836–1846)
- Aula or "Academiezaal" of the minor seminary in Sint-Truiden (1843–1846)
- Church, Our Lady, in Sint-Truiden, renovations and extensions (tower), (1847–1853)
- Church, Our Lady, in Doel (1851–1854)
- Church, Saint Anna and Saint Catherine, in Ghent (1853–1869)
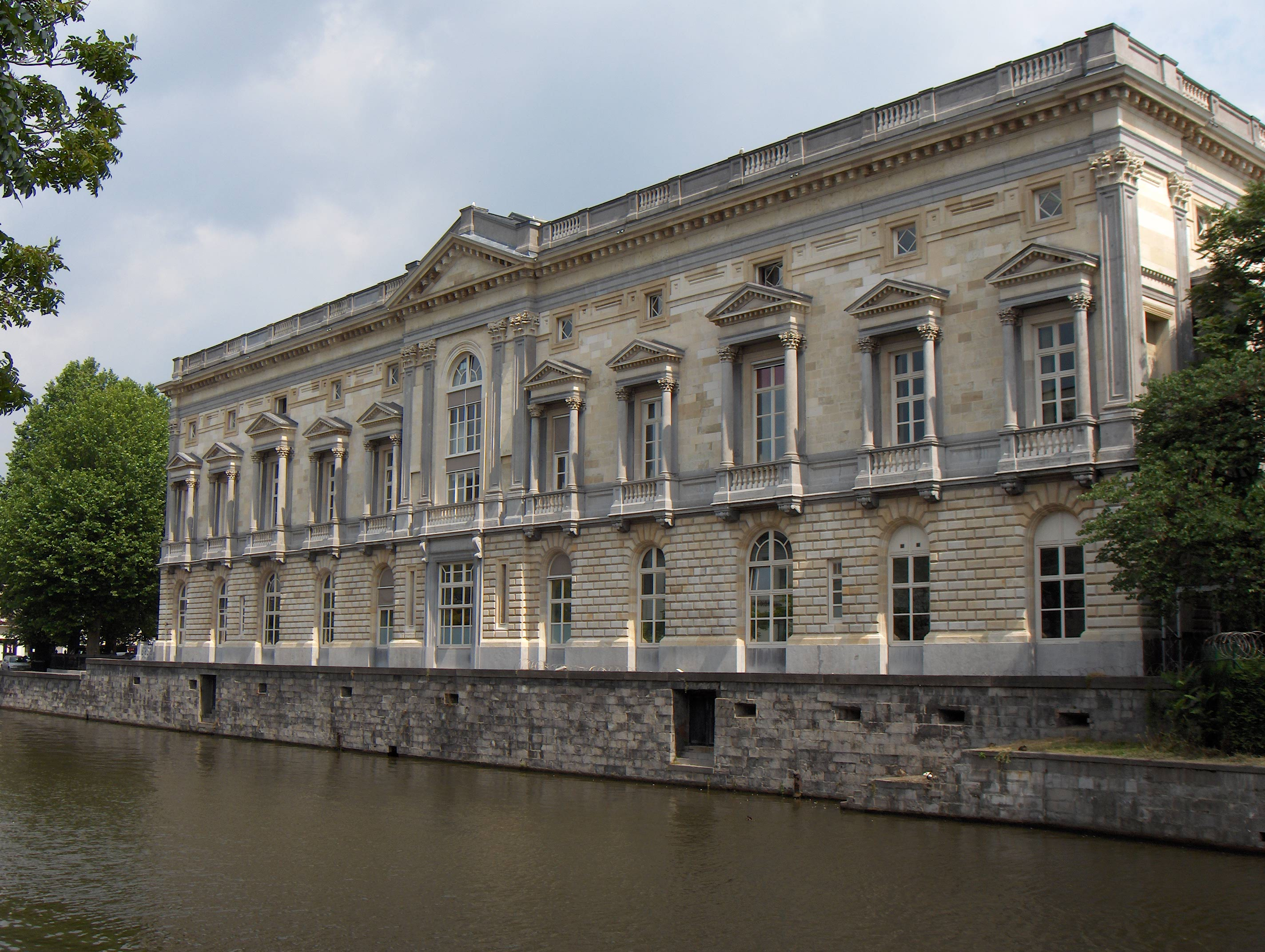
Law Courts of Ghent, lateral façade

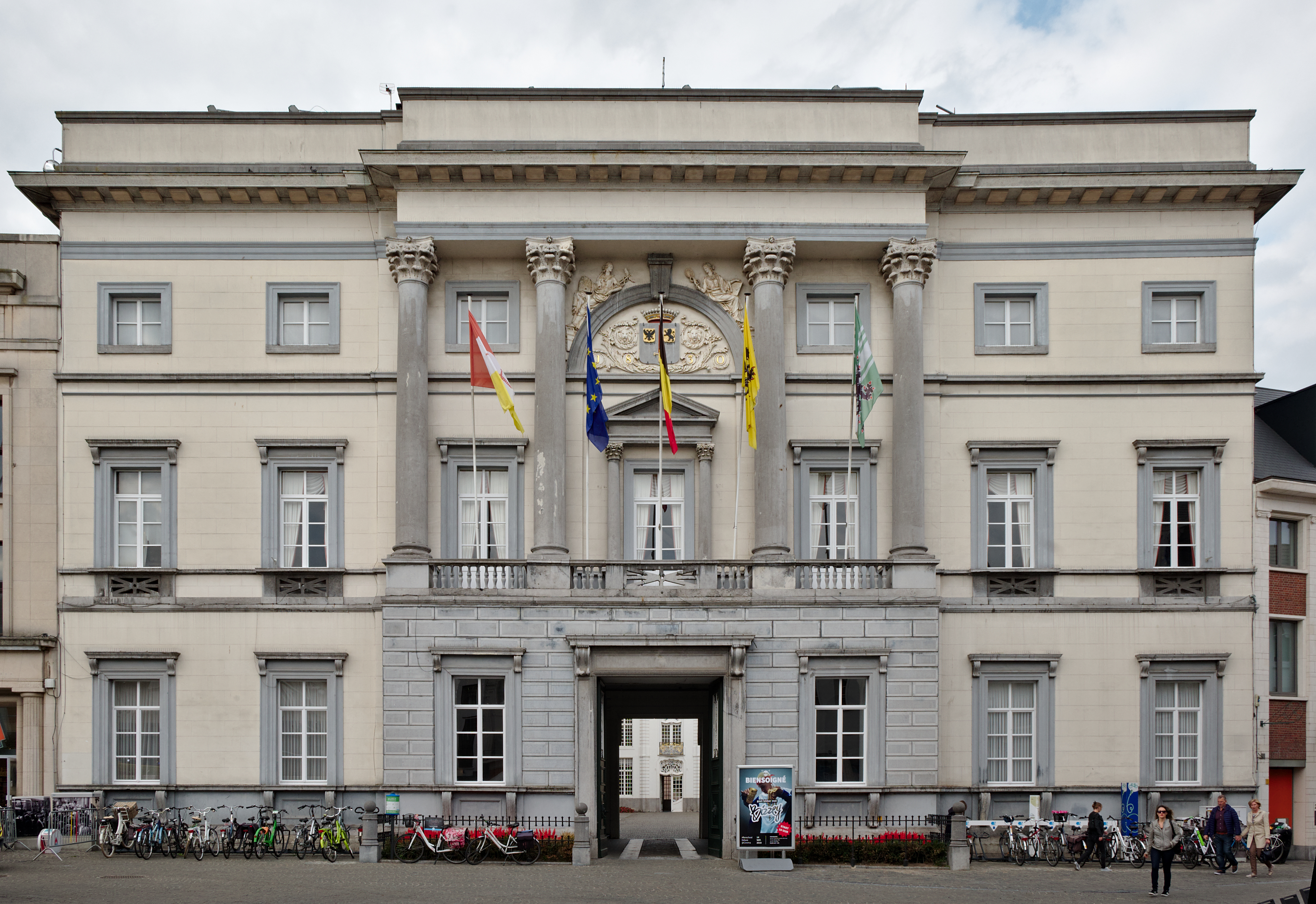
Town Hall of Aalst

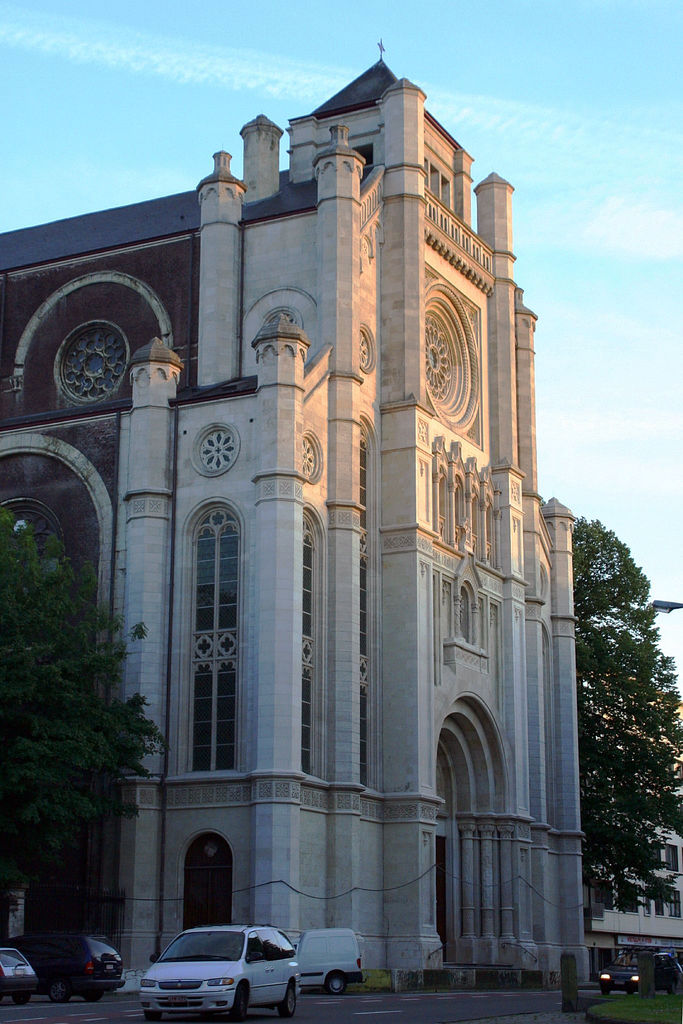
Church of Saint Anna (Ghent) in Ghent with unfinished tower
