= List of cities in Wallonia =

This is a list of cities in Wallonia, the southern part of Belgium. The status of "city" is historical and does not necessarily mean it has a high number of inhabitants: see city status in Belgium for more information.

Of the 261 Walloon municipalities, only 70 have the title city. They are as follows:

City	Arrondissement	Province	Inhabitants (1 January 2013)	Year of the Royal Order or of the Walloon Government Order	Communale charter
Andenne	Namur	Namur	25,795	1825	
Ans	Liège	Liège	28,625	2021	
Antoing	Tournai-Mouscron	Hainaut	7,693	1825	1817 (title)
Arlon	Arlon	Luxembourg	28,520	1825	
Ath	Ath	Hainaut	28,463	1825	1166
Aubange	Arlon	Luxembourg	16,856	2018	
Bastogne	Bastogne	Luxembourg	15,230	1825	1332
Beaumont	Thuin	Hainaut	7,053	1825	
Beauraing	Dinant	Namur	8,867	1985	
Binche	Thuin	Hainaut	33,091	1825	
Bouillon	Neufchâteau	Luxembourg	5,399	1825	
Braine-le-Comte	Soignies	Hainaut	21,408	1825	
Charleroi	Charleroi	Hainaut	203,753	1825	
Châtelet	Charleroi	Hainaut	36,319	1825	
Chièvres	Ath	Hainaut	6,798	1825	
Chimay	Thuin	Hainaut	9,836	1825	
Chiny	Virton	Luxembourg	5,178	1825	
Ciney	Dinant	Namur	15,852	1985	
Comines-Warneton	Tournai-Mouscron	Hainaut	18,005	1825 (Warneton)	
Couvin	Philippeville	Namur	13,952	1985	
Dinant	Dinant	Namur	13,668	1825	
Durbuy	Marche-en-Famenne	Luxembourg	11,238	1825	1331
Enghien	Soignies	Hainaut	13,286	1825	
Eupen	Verviers	Liège	18,892	1808	1808 (title)
Fleurus	Charleroi	Hainaut	22,666	1982	
Florenville	Virton	Luxembourg	5,527	1997	
Fontaine-l'Évêque	Charleroi	Hainaut	17,395	1825	
Fosses-la-Ville	Namur	Namur	10,208	1825	
Gembloux	Namur	Namur	24,451	1985	
Genappe	Nivelles	Walloon Brabant	15,160	1985	
Hannut	Waremme	Liège	15,766	1985	
Herstal	Liège	Liège	38,997	2009	
Herve	Verviers	Liège	17,224	1825	
Houffalize	Bastogne	Luxembourg	5,090	1825	
Huy	Huy	Liège	21,346	1825	1066
Jodoigne	Nivelles	Walloon Brabant	13,614	1985	
La Louvière	Soignies	Hainaut	79,486	1985	
La Roche-en-Ardenne	Marche-en-Famenne	Luxembourg	4,191	1825	
Le Rœulx	Soignies	Hainaut	8,249	1825	
Lessines	Soignies	Hainaut	18,471	1825	
Leuze-en-Hainaut	Tournai-Mouscron	Hainaut	13,610	1825	
Liège	Liège	Liège	195,931	1825	
Limbourg	Verviers	Liège	5,819	1825	
Malmedy	Verviers	Liège	12,316	historical	
Marche-en-Famenne	Marche-en-Famenne	Luxembourg	17,440	1825	
Mons	Mons	Hainaut	93,941	1825	
Mouscron	Mouscron	Hainaut	56,407	1986	
Namur	Namur	Namur	110,500	1825	
Neufchâteau	Neufchâteau	Luxembourg	7,342	1825	
Nivelles	Nivelles	Walloon Brabant	27,110	1825	
Ottignies-Louvain-la-Neuve	Nivelles	Walloon Brabant	31,353	1982	
Péruwelz	Tournai-Mouscron	Hainaut	17,302	1825	
Philippeville	Philippeville	Namur	9,074	1825	
Rochefort	Dinant	Namur	12,431	1985	
Saint-Ghislain	Mons	Hainaut	23,039	1825	
Saint-Hubert	Neufchâteau	Luxembourg	5,650	1825	
St. Vith	Verviers	Liège	9,479	historical	
Sambreville	Namur	Namur	9,479	2024	
Seraing	Liège	Liège	63,732	1999	
Soignies	Soignies	Hainaut	26,667	1825	
Spa	Verviers	Liège	10,345	2018	
Stavelot	Verviers	Liège	7,051	1825	
Thuin	Thuin	Hainaut	14,662	1825	
Tournai	Tournai-Mouscron	Hainaut	69,667	1825	
Tubize	Nivelles	Walloon Brabant	24,198	2017	
Verviers	Verviers	Liège	55,733	1825	
Virton	Virton	Luxembourg	11,540	1825	
Visé	Liège	Liège	17,453	1825	
Walcourt	Philippeville	Namur	18,215	1985	
Waremme	Waremme	Liège	14,795	1985	
Wavre	Nivelles	Walloon Brabant	33,365	1825	

== See also ==
- City status in Belgium
- List of cities in Belgium
- List of cities in Flanders
