= 1950 Belgian monarchy referendum =

Referendum on the return of King Leopold to the throne of Belgium

- 12 March 1950
- Are you of the opinion that King Leopold III should resume the exercise of his constitutional powers?

Results
Choice	Votes	%
Yes	2,933,382	57.68%
No	2,151,881	42.32%
Valid votes	5,085,263	97.11%
Invalid or blank votes	151,477	2.89%
Total votes	5,236,740	100.00%
Registered voters/turnout	5,635,452	92.92%
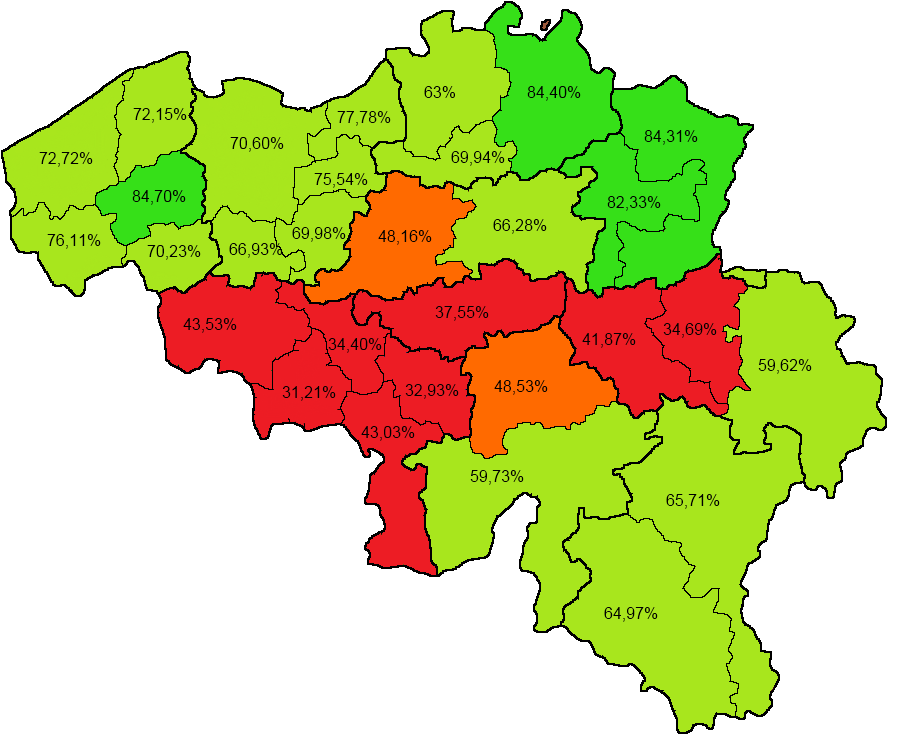
- Results by arrondissement

A referendum on allowing King Leopold III's return to Belgium, and restoration of his powers and duties as monarch was held in Belgium on 12 March 1950. The proposal was approved by 58% of voters.

== Background ==
King Leopold went into exile in June 1944, when Heinrich Himmler ordered him to leave Belgium. Leopold was held by the Nazis in Strobl, Austria until early May 1945, when he was freed by members of the United States 106th Cavalry Group. Because of the political troubles surrounding his wartime behaviour, King Leopold remained in exile in Switzerland until 1950, his brother Prince Charles, Count of Flanders having been installed as Regent after the Liberation in 1944.

The Catholics, who generally supported the King's return, won a majority in the Belgian Senate during the general election of 26 June 1949. The Catholics formed a government with the Liberals. The date of the referendum (Consultation populaire) the King wanted was set by this government for 12 March 1950.

Socialist Leader Paul-Henri Spaak opposed holding a referendum. He foresaw that the vote for Leopold might fall between 55% and 65%, giving no decisive mandate for the king's return, and that the King would carry Flanders and lose Wallonia. In that case, said Spaak, "the government would not only have on its hands the King's abdication or return, it would also have to appease the anger, acerbity and rancor of Flanders or Wallonia."

== Results ==
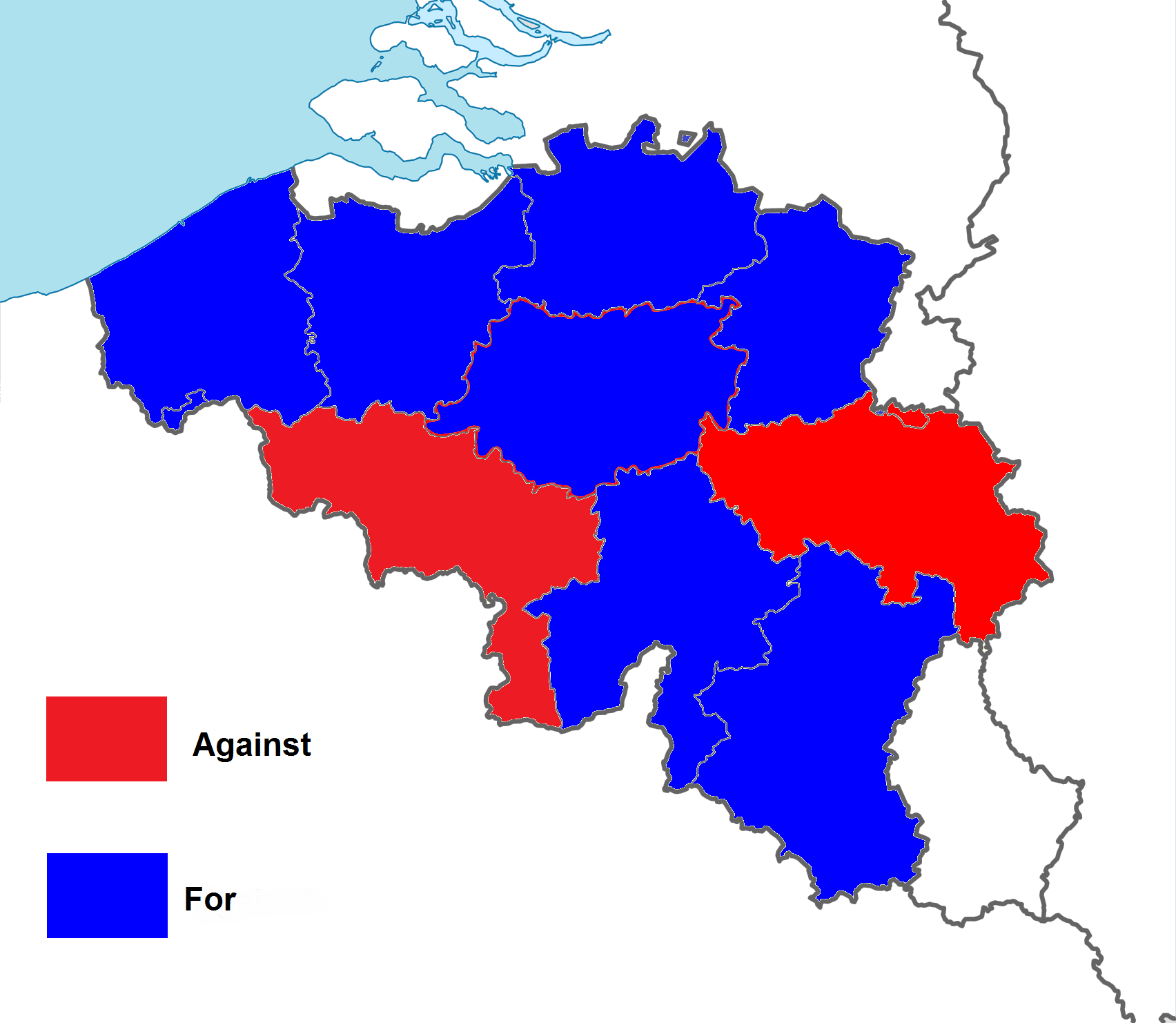
Belgian monarchy consultation 1950 results by province

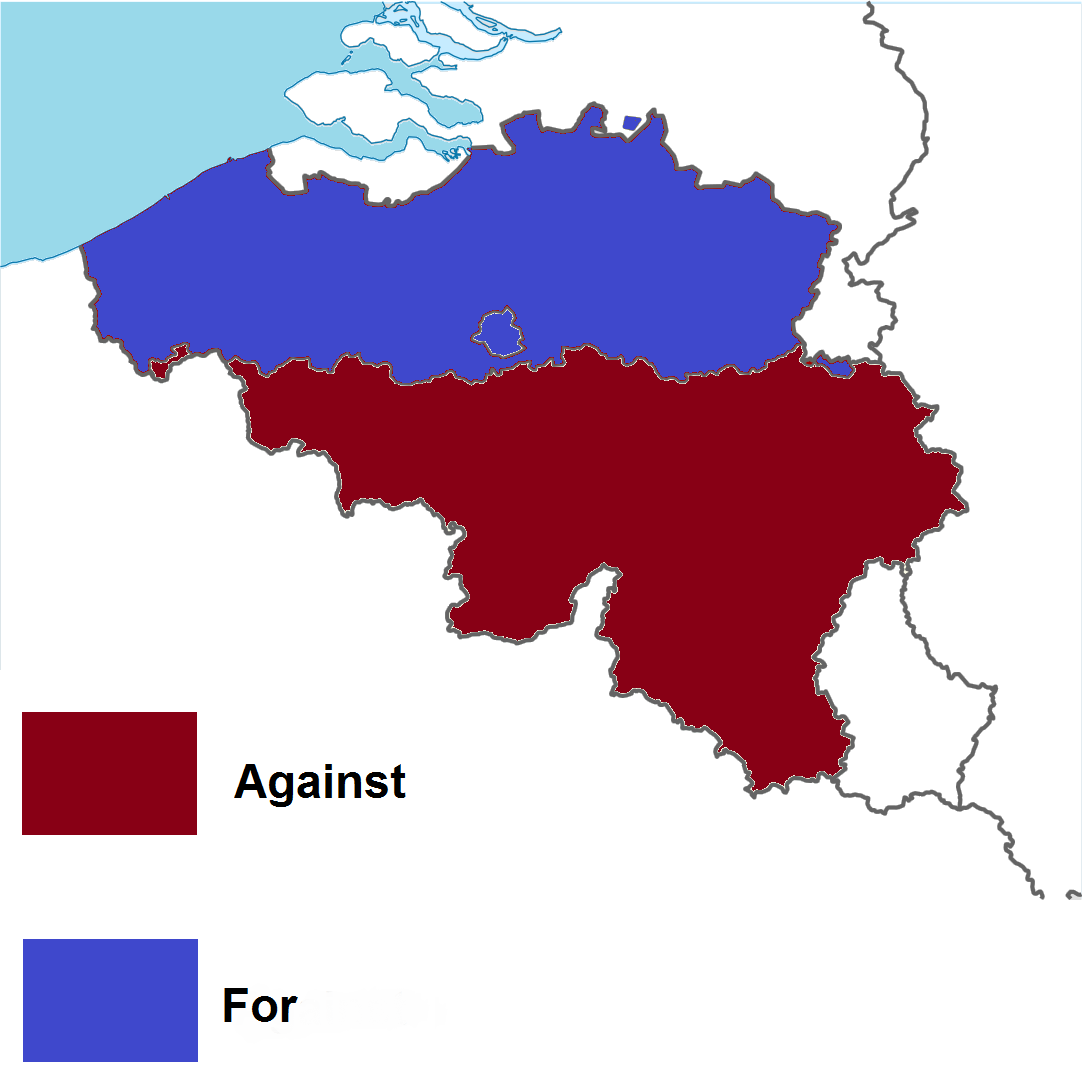
Results by region. For Against

The question voters were asked was:

Dutch: "Zijt U de mening toegedaan dat Koning Leopold III de uitoefening van zijn grondwettelijke machten zou hernemen?"
French: "Êtes-vous d'avis que le Roi Leopold III reprenne l'exercice de ses pouvoirs constitutionnels ?"
Translation: "Are you of the opinion that King Leopold III should resume the exercise of his constitutional powers?"

A majority voted in favour of Leopold's return. In Flanders 72% voted in favour while in Wallonia 58% voted against. In Brussels, 52% voted against.

Choice	Votes	%
For	2,933,382	57.68
Against	2,151,881	42.32
Total	5,085,263	100.00
Valid votes	5,085,263	97.11
Invalid/blank votes	151,477	2.89
Total votes	5,236,740	100.00
Registered voters/turnout	5,635,452	92.92
Source: Direct Democracy

=== By arrondissement ===
Arrondissement	Province	Total votes	Invalid/ blank	For		Against	
Arrondissement	Province	Total votes	Invalid/ blank	Votes	%	Votes	%
Antwerpen	Antwerp	484,936	12,236	297,863	63.0	174,837	37.0
Mechelen	Antwerp	156,099	3,905	106,450	69.9	45,744	30.1
Turnhout	Antwerp	134,684	3,678	110,576	84.4	20,430	15.6
Brussels	Brabant	832,087	26,773	387,914	48.2	417,400	51.8
Leuven	Brabant	197,540	7,530	125,944	66.3	64,066	33.7
Nivelles	Brabant	119,686	3,097	43,777	37.5	72,812	62.5
Brugge	West Flanders	119,573	3,677	83,623	72.2	32,273	27.8
Veurne-Diksmuide-Oostende	West Flanders	118,265	4,615	82,652	72.7	30,998	27.3
Roeselare-Tielt	West Flanders	116,945	3,372	96,196	84.7	17,377	15.3
Kortrijk	West Flanders	167,772	5,163	114,198	70.2	48,411	29.8
Ypres	West Flanders	74,101	3,011	54,109	76.1	16,981	23.9
Gent-Eeklo	East Flanders	328,298	9,792	224,874	70.6	93,632	29.4
Sint-Niklaas	East Flanders	111,048	1,833	84,955	77.8	24,260	22.2
Dendermonde	East Flanders	97,756	2,150	72,223	75.5	23,383	24.5
Aalst	East Flanders	145,994	2,924	100,130	70.0	42,940	30.0
Oudenaarde	East Flanders	73,500	2,371	47,607	66.9	23,522	33.1
Mons	Hainaut	162,250	4,467	49,243	31.2	108,540	68.8
Soignies	Hainaut	103,952	2,565	34,875	34.4	66,512	65.6
Charleroi	Hainaut	268,375	7,209	86,003	32.9	175,163	67.1
Thuin	Hainaut	82,540	2,294	34,529	43.0	45,717	57.0
Tournai-Ath	Hainaut	147,992	4,056	62,661	43.5	81,275	56.5
Liège	Liège	353,598	10,095	119,161	34.7	224,342	65.3
Huy-Waremme	Liège	109,286	3,132	44,445	41.9	61,709	58.1
Verviers	Liège	141,253	4,998	81,238	59.6	55,017	40.4
Hasselt	Limburg	109,472	3,513	87,241	82.3	18,718	17.7
Tongeren-Maaseik	Limburg	124,333	3,616	101,783	84.3	18,934	15.7
Arlon-Marche-Bastogne	Luxembourg	72,526	2,078	46,296	65.7	24,152	34.3
Neufchâteau-Virton	Luxembourg	59,223	1,595	37,443	65.0	20,185	35.0
Namur	Namur	135,600	3,495	64,112	48.5	67,993	51.5
Dinant-Philippeville	Namur	88,056	2,237	51,261	59.7	34,558	40.3
Flanders (four Flemish provinces plus Leuven) (Note: Almost corresponding to the present-day five Flemish provinces making up the Flemish Region, except for Halle-Vilvoorde which was then part of the arrondissement of Brussels)		2,560,316	73,386	1,790,424	71.0	696,506	28.0
Wallonia (four Walloon provinces plus Nivelles) (Note: Corresponding to the present-day five Walloon provinces making up the Walloon Region)		1,844,337	51,318	755,044	42.1	1,037,975	57.9
Total		5,236,740	151,477	2,933,382	57.7	2,151,881	42.3
Source: Theunissen, Alexandre, Senate
