= 1866 Belgian general election =

- 12 June 1866

61 of the 122 seats in the Chamber of Representatives 62 seats needed for a majority
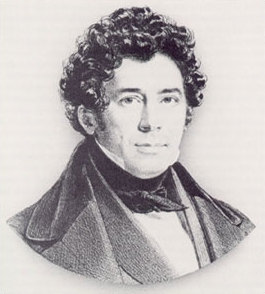

| | First party | Second party |
|---|---|---|
| Leader | Charles Rogier |
| Party | Liberal | Catholic |
| Leader since | Candidate for PM |
| Seats before | 64 seats | 52 seats |
| Seats won | 43 | 18 |
| Seats after | 70 | 52 |
| Seat change | ▲6 | Steady |
| Popular vote | 20,965 | 15,060 |
| Percentage | 58.20% | 41.80% |
Government before election
Rogier II
Liberal
Government after election
Rogier II
Liberal

Partial general elections were held in Belgium on 12 June 1866. In the elections for the Chamber of Representatives the result was a victory for the Liberal Party, which won 70 of the 122 seats. Voter turnout was 70%, although only 51,465 people were eligible to vote.

Under the alternating system, elections were only held in four out of the nine provinces: Hainaut, Limburg, Liège and East Flanders. Special elections were held in the arrondissements of Antwerp, Brussels and Leuven.

== Results ==
=== Chamber of Representatives ===
| Party | Votes | % | Seats | | |
| Party | Votes | % | Won | Total | +/– |
|---|---|---|---|---|---|
| Liberal Party | 20,965 | 58.20 | 43 | 70 | +6 |
| Catholics | 15,060 | 41.80 | 18 | 52 | 0 |
| Total | 36,025 | 100.00 | 61 | 122 | +6 |
| Total votes | 36,025 | – | | | |
| Registered voters/turnout | 51,465 | 70.00 | | | |
Source: Mackie & Rose, Sternberger et al.

== Constituencies ==
The distribution of seats among the electoral districts was as follows for the Chamber of Representatives, with the difference compared to the previous election due to population growth:

| Province | Arrondissement | Seats | Change |
|---|---|---|---|
| Antwerp | Antwerp | 6 | +1 |
| Antwerp | Mechelen | 3 | – |
| Antwerp | Turnhout | 3 | – |
| Limburg | Hasselt | 2 | – |
| Limburg | Maaseik | 1 | – |
| Limburg | Tongeren | 2 | – |
| East Flanders | Aalst | 3 | – |
| East Flanders | Oudenaarde | 3 | – |
| East Flanders | Gent | 8 | – |
| East Flanders | Eeklo | 1 | – |
| East Flanders | Dendermonde | 3 | – |
| East Flanders | Sint-Niklaas | 3 | – |
| West Flanders | Bruges | 3 | – |
| West Flanders | Roeselare | 2 | – |
| West Flanders | Tielt | 2 | – |
| West Flanders | Kortrijk | 4 | – |
| West Flanders | Ypres | 3 | – |
| West Flanders | Veurne | 1 | – |
| West Flanders | Diksmuide | 1 | – |
| West Flanders | Ostend | 1 | – |
| Brabant | Leuven | 5 | +1 |
| Brabant | Brussels | 13 | +2 |
| Brabant | Nivelles | 4 | – |
| Hainaut | Tournai | 4 | – |
| Hainaut | Ath | 2 | – |
| Hainaut | Charleroi | 5 | +1 |
| Hainaut | Thuin | 3 | +1 |
| Hainaut | Mons | 5 | – |
| Hainaut | Soignies | 3 | – |
| Liège | Huy | 2 | – |
| Liège | Waremme | 1 | – |
| Liège | Liège | 8 | +1 |
| Liège | Verviers | 3 | – |
| Luxembourg | Arlon | 1 | – |
| Luxembourg | Marche | 1 | – |
| Luxembourg | Bastogne | 1 | – |
| Luxembourg | Neufchâteau | 1 | – |
| Luxembourg | Virton | 1 | – |
| Namur | Namur | 4 | – |
| Namur | Dinant | 2 | – |
| Namur | Philippeville | 2 | +1 |
| | | 124 | +8 |
