= 1859 Belgian general election =

- 14 June 1859

58 of the 116 seats in the Chamber of Representatives 57 seats needed for a majority
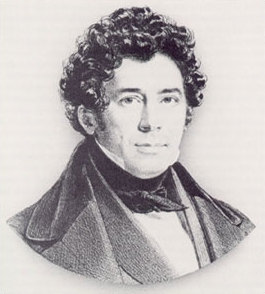

	First party	Second party
Leader	Charles Rogier
Party	Liberal	Catholic
Leader since	Candidate for PM
Seats before	70 seats	38 seats
Seats won	31	27
Seats after	69	47
Seat change	▼1	▲9
Popular vote	15,052	12,726
Percentage	54.19%	45.81%
Government before election
Rogier II
Liberal
Government after election
Rogier II
Liberal

Partial general elections were held in Belgium on 14 June 1859. The result was a victory for the Liberal Party, which won 69 of the 116 seats in the Chamber of Representatives and 31 of the 58 seats in the Senate. Voter turnout was 55.9%, although only 49,672 people were eligible to vote.

Under the alternating system, elections for the Chamber of Representatives were only held in five out of the nine provinces: Antwerp, Brabant, Luxembourg, Namur and West Flanders. Additionally, special elections were held on the same day in the arrondissements of Charleroi, Liège and Mons.

== Campaign ==
Twelve of the 58 seats were uncontested, of which the Catholics won nine and the Liberals three.

== Results ==
=== Chamber of Representatives ===
Party	Votes	%	Seats		
Party	Votes	%	Won	Total	+/–
Liberal Party	15,052	54.19	31	69	–1
Catholics	12,726	45.81	27	47	+9
Total	27,778	100.00	58	116	+8
Total votes	27,778	–			
Registered voters/turnout	49,672	55.92			
Source: Mackie & Rose, Sternberger et al.

The results exclude the voting figures for the Leper Colony seat.

=== Senate ===
Party	Seats
Liberal Party	31
Catholics	27
Total	58
Source: Sternberger et al.

== Constituencies ==
The distribution of seats among the electoral districts was as follows for the Chamber of Representatives, with the difference compared to the previous election due to population growth:

Province	Arrondissement	Seats	Change
Antwerp	Antwerp	6	–
Antwerp	Mechelen	3	–
Antwerp	Turnhout	3	+1
Limburg	Hasselt	2	–
Limburg	Maaseik	1	–
Limburg	Tongeren	2	–
East Flanders	Aalst	3	–
East Flanders	Oudenaarde	3	–
East Flanders	Gent	8	–
East Flanders	Eeklo	1	–
East Flanders	Dendermonde	3	–
East Flanders	Sint-Niklaas	3	–
West Flanders	Bruges	3	–
West Flanders	Roeselare	2	–
West Flanders	Tielt	2	–
West Flanders	Kortrijk	4	–
West Flanders	Ypres	3	–
West Flanders	Veurne	1	–
West Flanders	Diksmuide	1	–
West Flanders	Ostend	1	–
Brabant	Leuven	4	–
Brabant	Brussels	11	+2
Brabant	Nivelles	4	–
Hainaut	Tournai	4	–
Hainaut	Ath	2	–
Hainaut	Charleroi	4	+1
Hainaut	Thuin	2	–
Hainaut	Mons	5	+1
Hainaut	Soignies	3	–
Liège	Huy	2	–
Liège	Waremme	1	–
Liège	Liège	7	+2
Liège	Verviers	3	–
Luxembourg	Arlon	1	–
Luxembourg	Marche	1	–
Luxembourg	Bastogne	1	–
Luxembourg	Neufchâteau	1	–
Luxembourg	Virton	1	–
Namur	Namur	4	+1
Namur	Dinant	2	–
Namur	Philippeville	2	–
		116	+8
