= 1900 Belgian general election =

← 1898	27 May 1900	1902 →

All 152 seats in the Chamber of Representatives
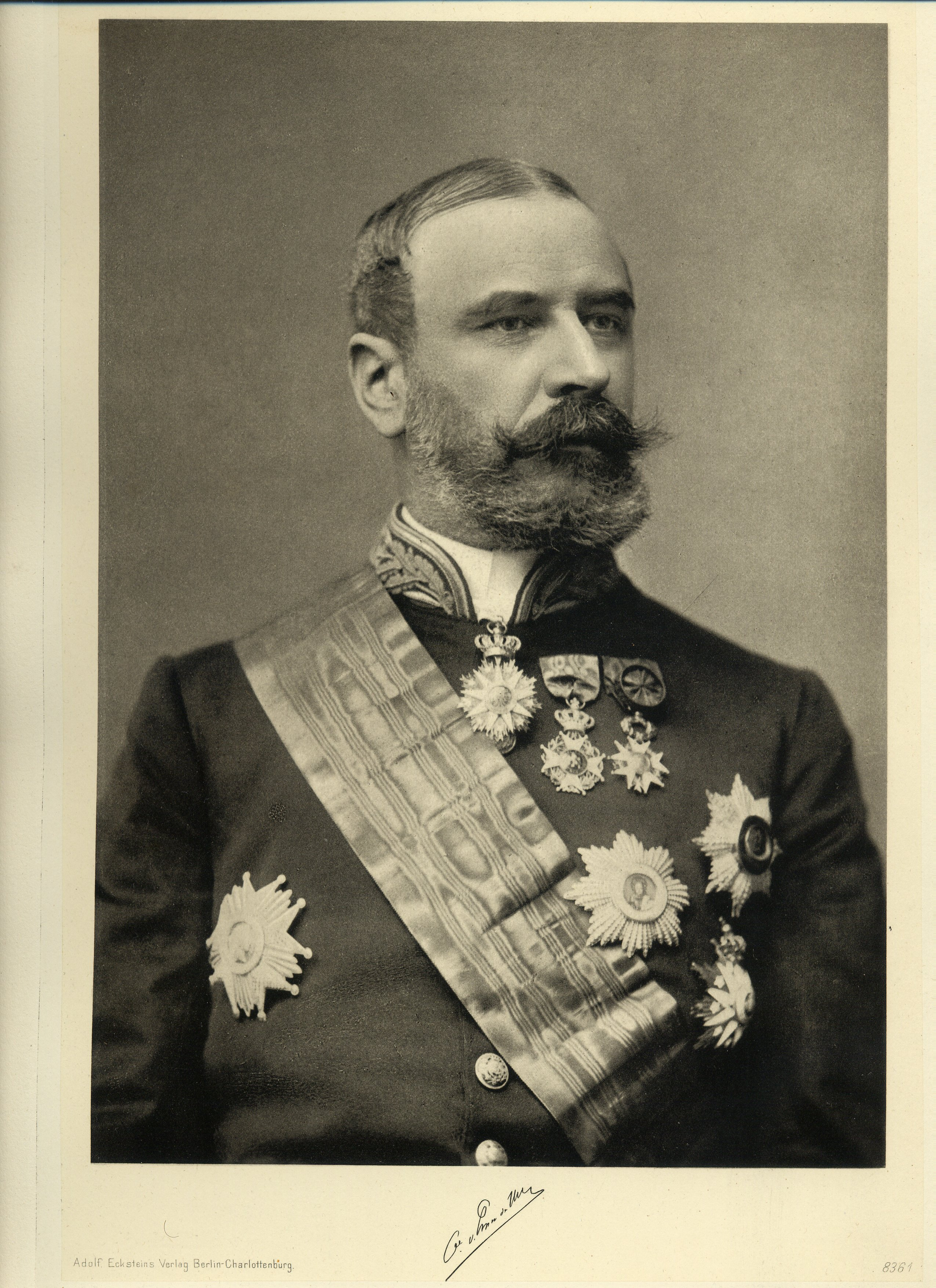

	First party	Second party	Third party
Leader	Paul de Smet de Naeyer	August De Winne
Party	Catholic	Labour	Liberal
Seats won	86	32	31
Popular vote	993,945	461,295	464,959
Percentage	48.46%	22.49%	22.67%
Government before election
de Smet de Naeyer II
Catholic
Government after election
de Smet de Naeyer II
Catholic

Full general elections were held in Belgium on 27 May 1900. They were the first elections under a proportional system (using the D'Hondt method) instead of a majority system, with Belgium becoming the first country in the world to adopt proportional representation for parliamentary elections. Single-member constituencies were replaced with multi-member constituencies of between three and eighteen seats.

The introduction of proportional representation was beneficial to the Liberal Party, which took significantly more seats. Although the Catholic Party lost seats, it retained its absolute majority, winning 86 of the 152 seats in the Chamber of Representatives and 44 of the 76 seats in the Senate.

== Constituencies ==
The distribution of seats among the electoral districts was as follows for the Chamber of Representatives. As the electoral system changed to a proportional one, the electoral arrondissements with only one or two representatives were grouped together to form larger ones. Each electoral district now had at least 3 representatives, with the exception of Neufchâteau-Virton.

Province	Arrondissement	Previous	New
Antwerp	Antwerp	11	
Antwerp	Mechelen	4	
Antwerp	Turnhout	3	
Limburg	Hasselt	3	
Limburg	Maaseik	1	3
Limburg	Tongeren	2	3
East Flanders	Aalst	4	
East Flanders	Oudenaarde	3	
East Flanders	Gent	9	10
East Flanders	Eeklo	1	10
East Flanders	Dendermonde	3	
East Flanders	Sint-Niklaas	4	
West Flanders	Bruges	3	
West Flanders	Roeselare	2	4
West Flanders	Tielt	2	4
West Flanders	Kortrijk	4	
West Flanders	Ypres	3	
West Flanders	Veurne	1	4
West Flanders	Diksmuide	1	4
West Flanders	Ostend	2	4
Brabant	Leuven	6	
Brabant	Brussels	18	
Brabant	Nivelles	4	
Hainaut	Tournai	4	6
Hainaut	Ath	2	6
Hainaut	Charleroi	8	
Hainaut	Thuin	3	
Hainaut	Mons	6	
Hainaut	Soignies	3	
Liège	Huy	2	4
Liège	Waremme	2	4
Liège	Liège	11	
Liège	Verviers	4	
Luxembourg	Arlon	1	3
Luxembourg	Marche	1	3
Luxembourg	Bastogne	1	3
Luxembourg	Neufchâteau	1	2
Luxembourg	Virton	1	2
Namur	Namur	4	
Namur	Dinant	2	4
Namur	Philippeville	2	4
		152	152

== Results ==
=== Chamber of Representatives ===
Party	Votes	%	Seats
Catholic Party	993,945	48.46	86
Liberal Party	464,959	22.67	31
Belgian Labour Party	461,295	22.49	32
Christene Volkspartij	52,093	2.54	1
Radical Party	33,840	1.65	2
Other parties	44,782	2.18	0
Total	2,050,914	100.00	152
Registered voters/turnout	2,269,414	–	
Source: Belgian Elections

=== Senate ===
Party	Votes	%	Seats
Catholic Party	911,262	52.81	44
Liberal Party	565,767	32.79	23
Belgian Labour Party	119,000	6.90	4
Radical Party	78,195	4.53	4
Social Radical Party	17,838	1.03	1
Liberal dissidents	4,633	0.27	0
Independents	28,970	1.68	0
Total	1,725,665	100.00	76
Registered voters/turnout	2,020,987	–	
Source: Nohlen & Stöver, Belgian Elections
