= 1949 Belgian general election =

← 1946	26 June 1949	1950 →

All 212 seats in the Chamber of Representatives 106 seats in the Senate 107 (Chamber) seats needed for a majority
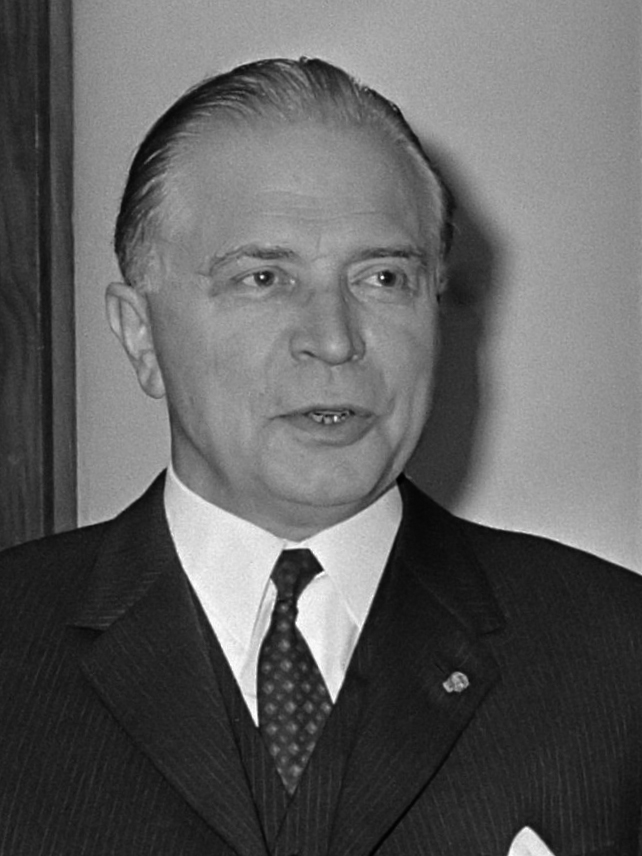

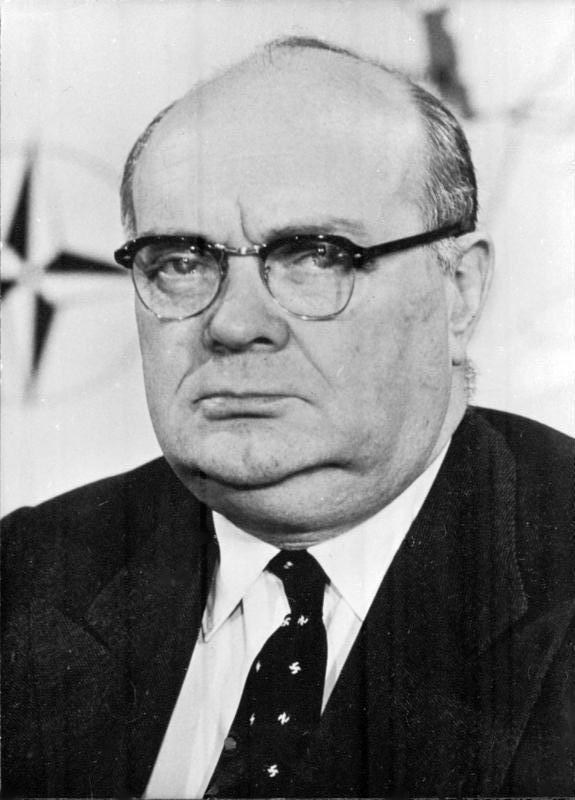

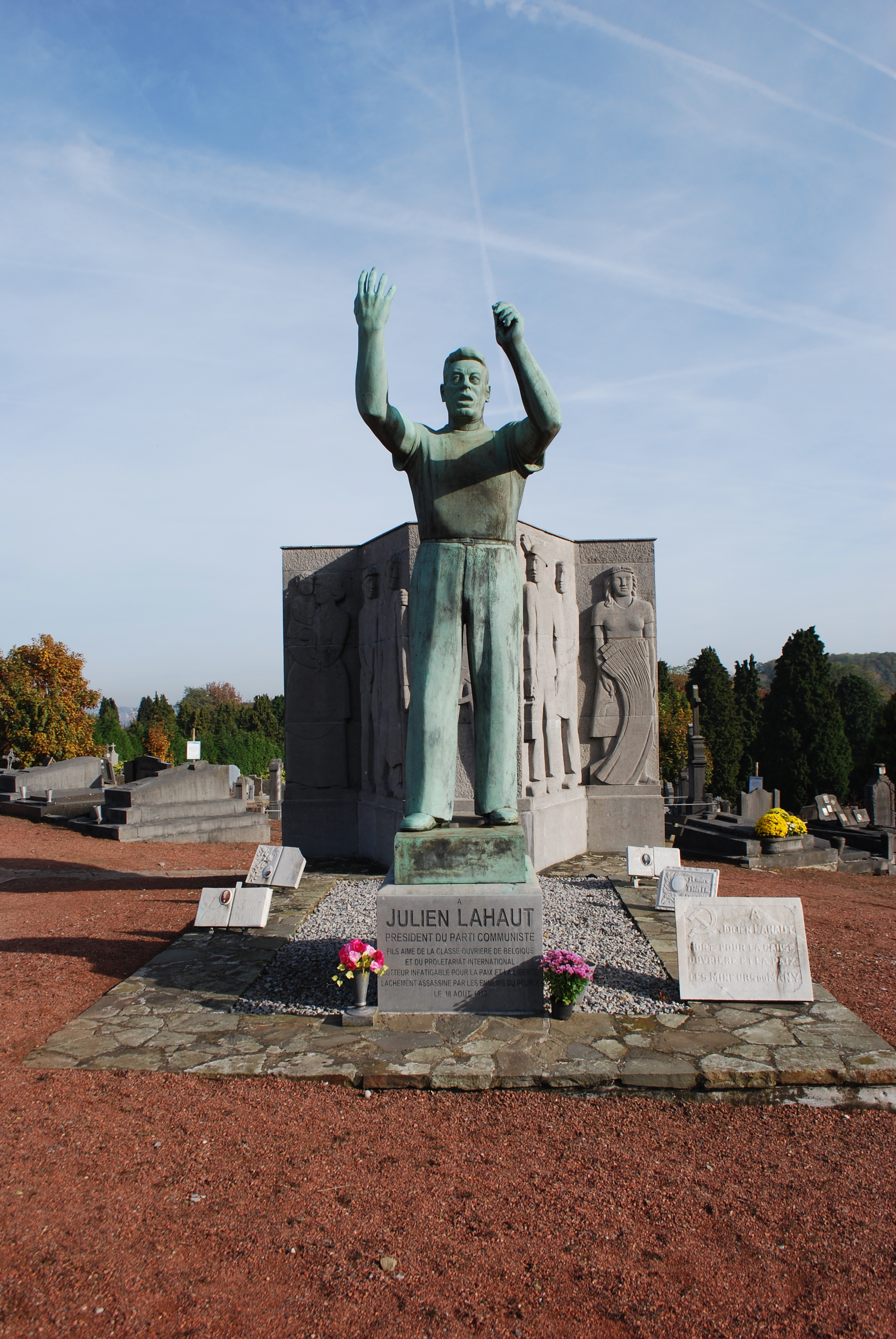
	First party	Second party
Leader	Gaston Eyskens	Paul-Henri Spaak
Party	Christian Social	Socialist
Leader since	Candidate for PM	Candidate for PM
Last election	92 seats, 42.54%	69 seats, 31.57%
Seats won	105	66
Seat change	▲13	▼3
Popular vote	2,190,895	1,496,539
Percentage	43.55%	29.76%
Swing	▲1.01%	▼1.81%
	Third party	Fourth party
Leader	Roger Motz	Julien Lahaut
Party	Liberal	Communist
Leader since	1945	1945
Last election	17 seats, 8.93%	23 seats, 12.69%
Seats won	29	12
Seat change	▲12	▼11
Popular vote	767,180	376,765
Percentage	15.25%	7.49%
Swing	▲6.32%	▼5.20%
- Chamber seat distribution by constituency
Government before election
Spaak IV
BSP/PSB-CVP/PSC
Government after election
G. Eyskens I
CVP/PSC-Lib

General elections were held in Belgium on 26 June 1949. Several reforms took effect prior to the elections; they were the first after the introduction of universal women's suffrage; the number of seats in the Chamber of Representatives was increased from 202 to 212, and from now on, elections for the nine provincial councils were held simultaneously with parliamentary elections. The number of Chamber seats and the simultaneous provincial and parliamentary elections would remain unchanged until state reforms in 1993.

The result was a victory for the Christian Social Party, which won 105 of the 212 seats in the Chamber of Representatives and 54 of the 106 seats in the Senate. Voter turnout was 94.4%.

== Results ==
=== Chamber of Deputies ===
Party	Votes	%	Seats	+/–
Christian Social Party	2,190,895	43.55	105	+13
Belgian Socialist Party	1,496,539	29.75	66	-3
Liberal Party	767,180	15.25	29	+12
Communist Party of Belgium	376,765	7.49	12	–11
Flemish Concentration	103,896	2.07	0	New
Middle Class	45,721	0.91	0	0
Independent Party	20,450	0.41	0	New
Traders Union	6,709	0.13	0	New
Belgian National Rally	6,077	0.12	0	New
Walloon Unity	5,852	0.12	0	New
Luxembourg Defence	2,024	0.04	0	New
Cosmocraten	685	0.01	0	New
Light	680	0.01	0	New
Independent General Syndicate	610	0.01	0	New
Belgian Patriotic Party	55	0.00	0	New
Independents	6,745	0.13	0	0
Total	5,030,883	100.00	212	+10
Valid votes	5,030,883	94.56		
Invalid/blank votes	289,333	5.44		
Total votes	5,320,216	100.00		
Registered voters/turnout	5,635,452	94.41		
Source: Belgian Elections

=== Senate ===
Party	Votes	%	Seats	+/–
Christian Social Party	2,208,553	44.96	54	+3
Belgian Socialist Party	1,410,135	28.71	33	–1
Liberal Party	762,530	15.52	14	+10
Communist Party of Belgium	377,209	7.68	5	–6
Flemish Concentration	66,055	1.34	0	New
Middle Class	37,302	0.76	0	New
Independent Party	20,357	0.41	0	New
A	13,379	0.27	0	New
Traders Union	5,507	0.11	0	New
Walloon Unity	5,010	0.10	0	New
B	554	0.01	0	New
Independents	5,241	0.11	0	0
Total	4,911,832	100.00	106	+5
Valid votes	4,911,832	93.87		
Invalid/blank votes	321,017	6.13		
Total votes	5,232,849	100.00		
Registered voters/turnout	5,635,452	92.86		
Source: Belgian Elections

== Constituencies ==
The distribution of seats among the electoral districts of the Chamber of Representatives was as follows. Several arrondissements got one or more additional seats.

Province	Arrondissement(s)	Seats	Change
Antwerp	Antwerp	20	+2
Antwerp	Mechelen	6	–
Antwerp	Turnhout	6	+1
Limburg	Hasselt	5	+1
Limburg	Tongeren-Maaseik	6	+1
East Flanders	Aalst	6	–
East Flanders	Oudenaarde	3	–
East Flanders	Gent-Eeklo	13	+1
East Flanders	Dendermonde	4	–
East Flanders	Sint-Niklaas	4	–
West Flanders	Bruges	5	+1
West Flanders	Roeselare-Tielt	5	+1
West Flanders	Kortrijk	6	–
West Flanders	Ypres	3	–
West Flanders	Veurne-Diksmuide-Ostend	5	–
Brabant	Leuven	7	–
Brabant	Brussels	32	+2
Brabant	Nivelles	5	–
Hainaut	Tournai-Ath	6	–
Hainaut	Charleroi	11	–
Hainaut	Thuin	4	–
Hainaut	Mons	7	–
Hainaut	Soignies	3	–
Liège	Huy-Waremme	4	–
Liège	Liège	14	–
Liège	Verviers	5	–
Luxembourg	Arlon-Marche-Bastogne	3	–
Luxembourg	Neufchâteau-Virton	3	–
Namur	Namur	5	–
Namur	Dinant-Philippeville	4	–
Total		212	+10
