= 1898 Belgian general election =

← 1896	22 May 1898	1900 →

75 of the 152 seats in the Chamber of Representatives
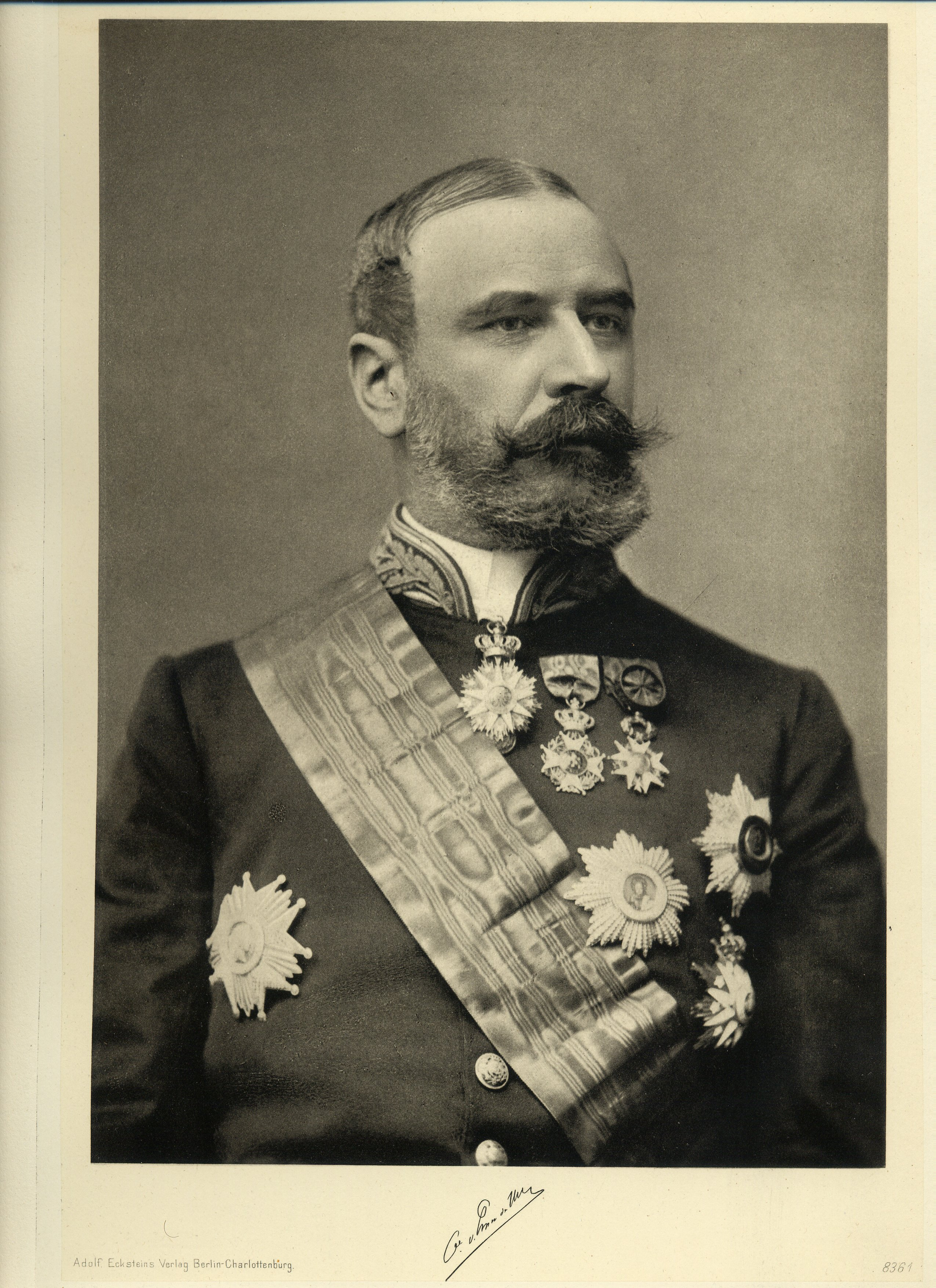

	First party	Second party
Leader	Paul de Smet de Naeyer	Grégoire Serwy
Party	Catholic	Labour
Seats won	36	15
Popular vote	377,275	213,511
Percentage	38.49%	21.78%
	Third party	Fourth party
Leader		N/A
Party	Liberal	Liberal–Socialist
Seats won	12	8
Popular vote	177,802	91,947
Percentage	18.14%	9.38%
Government before election
de Smet de Naeyer I
Catholic
Government after election
de Smet de Naeyer I
Catholic

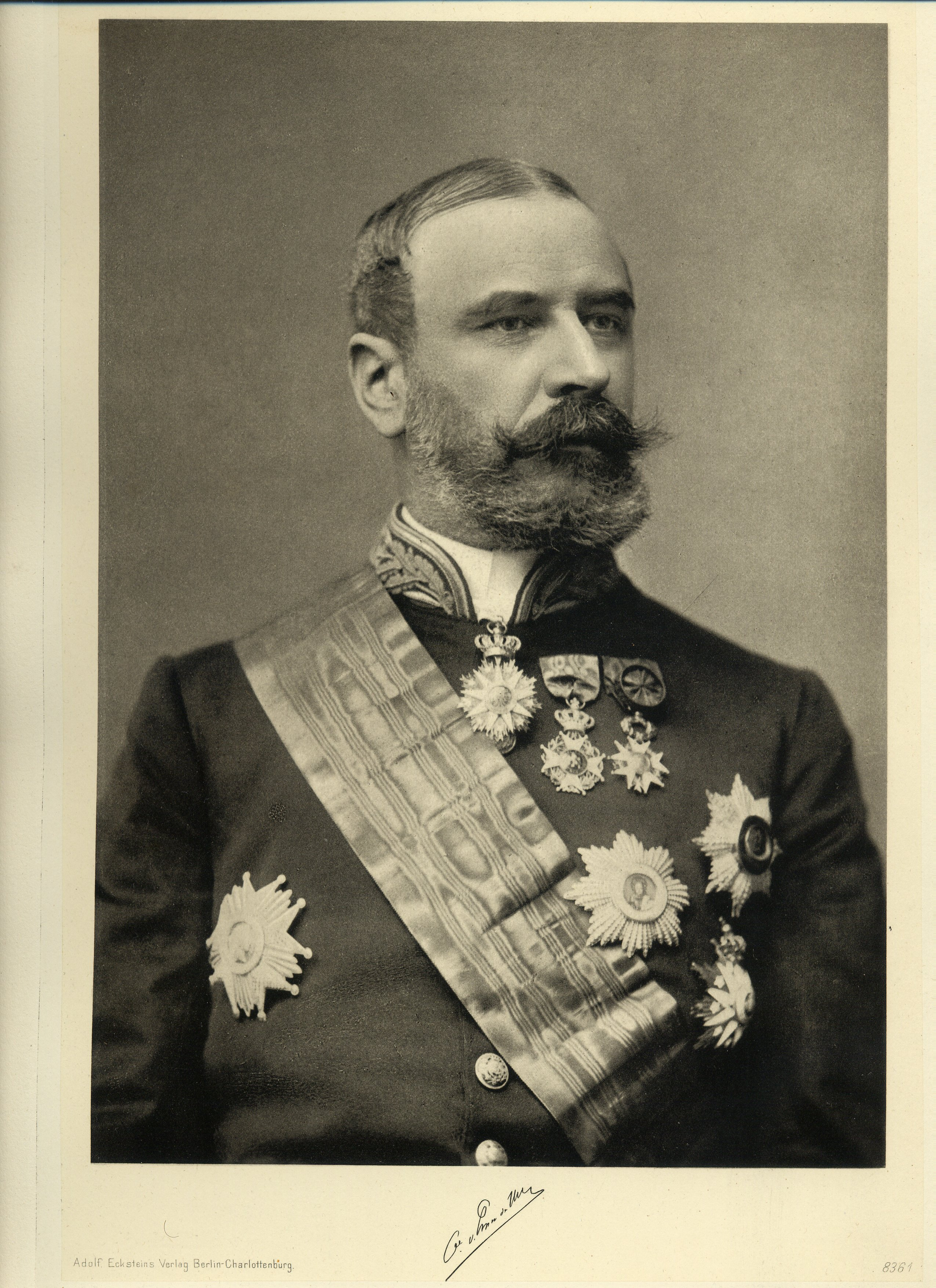
Paul de Smet de Naeyer, the re-elected representative for Ghent and incumbent head of government

Partial legislative elections were held in Belgium on 22 May 1898, with run-off elections held on 29 May. Under the alternating system, elections for the Chamber of Representatives were held in only four of the nine provinces: Hainaut, Limburg, Liège and East Flanders, with only 75 seats out of the 152 seats in the Chamber of Representatives up for election. The Catholic Party retained their absolute majority.

Adolf Daens, who was elected in 1894 for Aalst and served one term, was convinced not to run for re-election. His fight for a social Christian Democratic party was opposed by conservative Catholics, especially fellow Aalst MP Charles Woeste. None of the other "Daensists" (Christene Volkspartij) who ran were elected.

A special election in Bastogne was held on 24 July 1898. Henry Delvaux de Fenffe was elected to replace Emile Van Hoorde, who became a provincial senator.

They were the last regular legislative elections under a majority system; the next elections in 1900 saw the introduction of a proportional system.

The newly elected legislature met in regular session on 8 November 1898.

== Results ==
=== Chamber of Representatives ===
Party	Votes	%	Seats
Party	Votes	%	Won
Catholic Party	377,275	38.49	36
Belgian Labour Party	213,511	21.78	15
Liberal Party	177,802	18.14	12
Liberal–Socialist kartels	91,947	9.38	8
Christene Volkspartij	22,962	2.34	1
Left kartels	17,724	1.81	1
Dissident Catholics	15,804	1.61	0
Other parties	63,122	6.44	2
Total	980,147	100.00	75
Source: Belgian Elections

=== Senate ===
Party	Votes	%
Catholic Party	147,160	51.49
Liberal Party	134,437	47.04
Other parties	4,202	1.47
Total	285,799	100.00
Source: Nohlen & Stöver

== Constituencies ==
Province	Arrondissement	Chamber	Won by
Limburg	Hasselt	3	Catholic hold (unopposed re-election)
Limburg	Maaseik	1	Catholic hold
Limburg	Tongeren	2	Catholic hold
East Flanders	Aalst	4	Catholic hold
East Flanders	Oudenaarde	3	Catholic hold
East Flanders	Gent	9	Catholic hold
East Flanders	Eeklo	1	Catholic hold (unopposed re-election)
East Flanders	Dendermonde	3	Catholic hold
East Flanders	Sint-Niklaas	4	Catholic hold
Hainaut	Tournai	4	Catholic hold
Hainaut	Ath	2	Liberal gain from Catholic
Hainaut	Charleroi	8	Socialist hold
Hainaut	Thuin	3	Socialist gain (from 1 Catholic, 1 liberal and 1 socialist)
Hainaut	Mons	6	Socialist hold
Hainaut	Soignies	3	Socialist hold
Liège	Huy	2	1 liberal hold, 1 socialist gain from liberal
Liège	Waremme	2	Catholic hold
Liège	Liège	11	Socialist (6) and liberal (5) hold
Liège	Verviers	4	Catholic gain from socialist

Liberals gained two seats from Catholics in Ath, socialists gained a seat from Catholics and a seat from liberals in Thuin, socialists gained a seat from liberals in Huy and Catholics gained four seats from socialists in Verviers, resulting in a total of one seat changing from socialists to Catholics.
