= List of protected heritage sites in Péruwelz =

This table shows an overview of the protected heritage sites in the Walloon town Péruwelz. This list is part of Belgium's national heritage.

Object	Year/architect	Town/section	Address	Coordinates	Number^{?}	Image
House facade and roof front ^{(nl)} ^{(fr)}		Péruwelz	Grand-Place n°4	50.509941°N 3.594427°E	57064-CLT-0002-01 Info	
Ruins of Castle and E. Simon municipal park ^{(nl)} ^{(fr)}		Péruwelz		50.508304°N 3.591185°E	57064-CLT-0003-01 Info	Ruïnes van kasteel en sectionlijk park E. Simon
Tower and portico of the church of Saint-Quentin ^{(nl)} ^{(fr)}		Péruwelz		50.507455°N 3.589487°E	57064-CLT-0004-01 Info	Toren en portaal van kerk Saint-Quentin
Rectory and parish St. Quentin: facades and roofs ^{(nl)} ^{(fr)}		Péruwelz	rue de Sondeville, n°2	50.507177°N 3.589465°E	57064-CLT-0005-01 Info	Pastorie en parochie Quentin: gevels en daken
Ensemble of the tower and the portico of Saint-Quentin church, the parsonage and their environment ^{(nl)} ^{(fr)}		Péruwelz		50.507073°N 3.589374°E	57064-CLT-0006-01 Info	Ensemble van de toren en de portiek van kerk Saint-Quentin, de pastorie en hun omgeving
Verte Chasse drive ^{(nl)} ^{(fr)}		Péruwelz		50.506767°N 3.592675°E	57064-CLT-0007-01 Info	Dreef van Verte Chasse
Church of Saint-Gery ^{(nl)} ^{(fr)}		Péruwelz		50.529163°N 3.587203°E	57064-CLT-0010-01 Info	Kerk Saint-Géry
Music kiosk in the municipal park ^{(nl)} ^{(fr)}		Péruwelz		50.508561°N 3.593045°E	57064-CLT-0011-01 Info	Muziekkiosk, sectionlijk park
House "Pavot" and the ensemble of the house and its surroundings ^{(nl)} ^{(fr)}		Péruwelz	rue Astrid n°11	50.511481°N 3.592582°E	57064-CLT-0012-01 Info	
station ^{(nl)} ^{(fr)}		Péruwelz	rue des Français	50.513500°N 3.591793°E	57064-CLT-0013-01 Info	
Castle "Roseraie" park ^{(nl)} ^{(fr)}		Péruwelz		50.505550°N 3.591396°E	57064-CLT-0014-01 Info	
Roland House: façades and roofs ^{(nl)} ^{(fr)}		Péruwelz	rue Albert Ier n°20	50.509013°N 3.591517°E	57064-CLT-0015-01 Info	
House: walls and roofs ^{(nl)} ^{(fr)}		Péruwelz	Grand-Place n°38	50.510120°N 3.592291°E	57064-CLT-0016-01 Info	
Old washing place "bassin Dubuisson" in the municipal park ^{(nl)} ^{(fr)}		Péruwelz		50.508313°N 3.591361°E	57064-CLT-0017-01 Info	Oude wasplaats "bassin Dubuisson", sectionlijk park
House called "Petit Château": facades and roofs ^{(nl)} ^{(fr)}		Péruwelz	rue Albert Ier, n°56	50.508145°N 3.590403°E	57064-CLT-0018-01 Info	
Castle of Fontenelle: facades, roofs and outbuildings, including the environment and access bridge ^{(nl)} ^{(fr)}		Péruwelz	rue du Coron, n°6 (S)	50.539968°N 3.543823°E	57064-CLT-0019-01 Info	
Basilica Notre-Dame-de-Bon-Secours ^{(nl)} ^{(fr)}		Péruwelz	place Jean Absil n°3	50.497295°N 3.607275°E	57064-CLT-0021-01 Info	Basiliek Notre-Dame-de-Bon-Secours

== See also ==
- List of protected heritage sites in Hainaut (province)
- Péruwelz
