= Picardy Wallonia =

Picardy Wallonia (French: Wallonie picarde, pronounced [walɔni pikaʁd]; Picard: Walonnie picarte) or Western Hainaut (French: Hainaut-Occidental; Picard: Hénau occhidintal) is the northwest part of the province of Hainaut in Wallonia, where the Picard language is used.

== Geography ==
The most important city in Picardy Wallonia is Tournai which is also the oldest city of the Low countries. The Tournai Cathedral, has been classified both as a Wallonia's major heritage and as a World Heritage Site.Tournai is labelled on Tabula Peutingeriana. Tournai gives its name to the Tournaisian: The “Calcaire de Tournai” comprises the limestone formations cropping out in the Mélantois-Tournaisis Anticline (...) which have been quarried since the Roman conquest. Its relationship with the succession of the Dinant area was only understood following study of the Asile d’Aliénés borehole at Tournai and the Vieux-Leuze borehole at Leuze [...] These boreholes exhibited a rather typical middle Tournaisian succession below the “Calcaire de Tournai” that was easy to correlate with the succession of the Dinant area.

The largest find of Iguanodon remains to date occurred in 1878 in a coal mine at Bernissart, at a depth of 322 m (1056 ft).

== Culture ==
Casterman, an important company based in Tournai, published Franco-Belgian comics. In 1934, Casterman took over the Le Petit Vingtième editions for the publication of the albums of The Adventures of Tintin, and after the great success of Hergé's albums, authors such as Jacques Martin, François Craenhals and C. & V. Hansen, the first albums of Corto Maltese by the Italian author Hugo Pratt. The company established its monthly magazine (A Suivre), which was to influence the comics revival of the 1990s. It is now part of the Flammarion Publishing group.

Saluk in Calenelle (Péruwelz) produces and distributes billiard balls under the registered trademark Aramith in more than 85 countries, and has a marketshare of 80% worldwide (90% of the US market).
