= Arrondissement of Mouscron =

Arrondissement of Mouscron Arrondissement de Mouscron
- Former arrondissement
- Location of the arrondissement in Hainaut
- Coordinates: 50.75°N 3.2°E
- Country: Belgium
- Region: Wallonia
- Province: Hainaut
- Municipalities: 2

Area
  - Total: 101.17 km^{2} (39.06 sq mi)

Population (1 January 2017)
  - Total: 75,875
  - Density: 749.98/km^{2} (1,942.4/sq mi)
- Time zone: UTC+1 (CET)
  - Summer (DST): UTC+2 (CEST)

The Arrondissement of Mouscron (French: Arrondissement de Mouscron; Dutch: Arrondissement Moeskroen) is a former arrondissement in the Walloon province of Hainaut, Belgium. It is not a judicial arrondissement. Its municipalities are a part of the Judicial Arrondissement of Tournai.

The arrondissement was created in 1963 after several municipalities were transferred from the Dutch-speaking province of West Flanders to French-speaking Hainaut following the language laws of 1962. In 2019 it was merged into the new Arrondissement of Tournai-Mouscron.

== Municipalities ==
The Administrative Arrondissement of Mouscron consists of the following municipalities and former municipalities (with their Dutch name):

- Comines-Warneton (Komen-Waasten)
  - Comines (Komen)
  - Houthem
  - Ploegsteert
  - Bas-Warneton (Neerwaasten)
  - Warneton (Waasten)
- Mouscron (Moeskroen)
  - Mouscron (Moeskroen)
  - Luingne
  - Dottignies (Dottenijs)
  - Herseaux (Herzeeuw)
