= List of protected heritage sites in Chièvres =

This table shows an overview of the protected heritage sites in the Walloon town Chièvres. This list is part of Belgium's national heritage.

Object	Year/architect	Town/section	Address	Coordinates	Number^{?}	Image
The chapel of Saint-Jean Baptiste ^{(nl)} ^{(fr)}		Chièvres		50.584708°N 3.808141°E	51014-CLT-0001-01 Info	De kapel van Saint-Jean Baptiste
Château d'Egmont ^{(nl)} ^{(fr)}		Chièvres	Grand'Place, n° s 16-17	50.587669°N 3.808097°E	51014-CLT-0002-01 Info	Kasteel d'Egmont
The church of Saint-Martin ^{(nl)} ^{(fr)}		Chièvres		50.588449°N 3.806596°E	51014-CLT-0003-01 Info	
Tower Gavre ^{(nl)} ^{(fr)}		Chièvres		50.588850°N 3.805827°E	51014-CLT-0004-01 Info	
Sections of water retaining walls, a 325 m south of the tower of Gavre and the other 145 m to the east ^{(nl)} ^{(fr)}		Chièvres		50.587334°N 3.805168°E	51014-CLT-0005-01 Info	
The chapel de la Ladrerie ^{(nl)} ^{(fr)}		Chièvres	rue d'Ath, n° 43	50.597360°N 3.801496°E	51014-CLT-0006-01 Info	
fortified house ^{(nl)} ^{(fr)}		Chièvres	rue de la Cour, n° 38 et alentours	50.559608°N 3.744717°E	51014-CLT-0007-01 Info	Versterkt huis
The Basilica of Notre-Dame Cathedral and its surroundings ^{(nl)} ^{(fr)}		Chièvres		50.581092°N 3.774061°E	51014-CLT-0008-01 Info	De basiliek van Notre-Dame en haar omgeving
Defense Wall south of the city, Faubourg Saint-Jean ^{(nl)} ^{(fr)}		Chièvres		50.585756°N 3.806537°E	51014-CLT-0009-01 Info	

== See also ==
- List of protected heritage sites in Hainaut (province)
- Chièvres
