= Mont-de-l'Enclus =

Municipality in Hainaut Province, Wallonia, Belgium

Mont-de-l'Enclus Mont-éd-l'-Enclus (Picard): Kluisberg (Dutch)
- Municipality
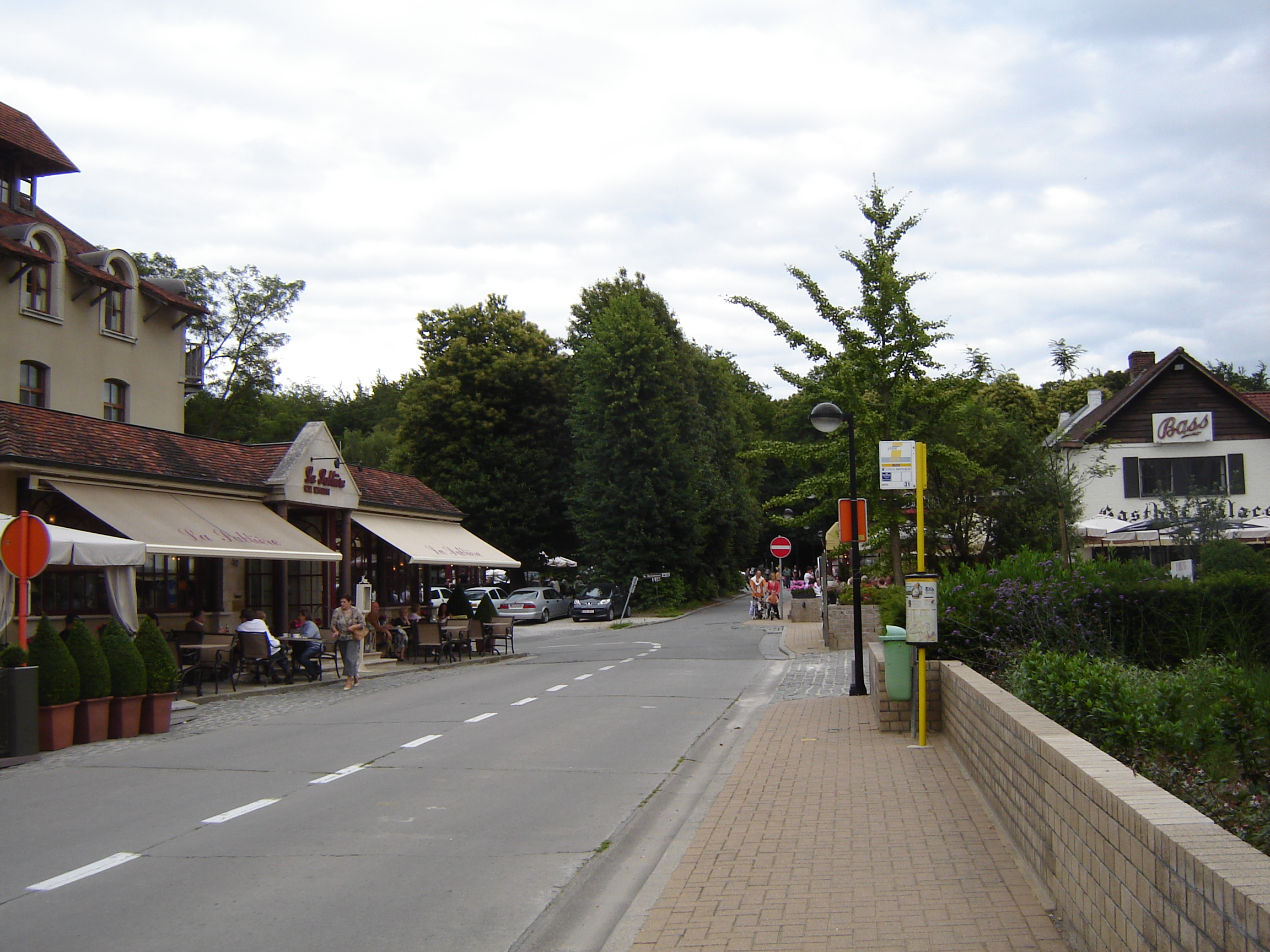

- Flag Coat of arms

- The municipality in the province of Hainaut
- Interactive map of Mont-de-l'Enclus
- Location in Belgium
- Coordinates: 50°44′N 3°30′E
- Country: Belgium
- Community: French Community
- Region: Wallonia
- Province: Hainaut
- Arrondissement: Tournai-Mouscron

Government
  - Mayor: Jean-Pierre Bourdeaud'Huy (MR)
  - Governing party: MR

Area
  - Total: 27.16 km^{2} (10.49 sq mi)

Population (2026-01-01)
  - Total: 3,839
  - Density: 141.3/km^{2} (366.1/sq mi)
- Postal codes: 7750
- NIS code: 57095
- Area codes: 069
- Website: montdelenclus.be

Mont-de-l'Enclus (French pronunciation: [mɔ̃ də lɑ̃kly]; Dutch: Kluisberg [ˈklœyzˌbɛr(ə)x]; Picard: Mont-éd-l'-Enclus) is a municipality of Wallonia located in the province of Hainaut, Belgium.

It consists of the districts of Amougies, Anserœul, Orroir and Russegnies.

The municipality is located in Picardy Wallonia.

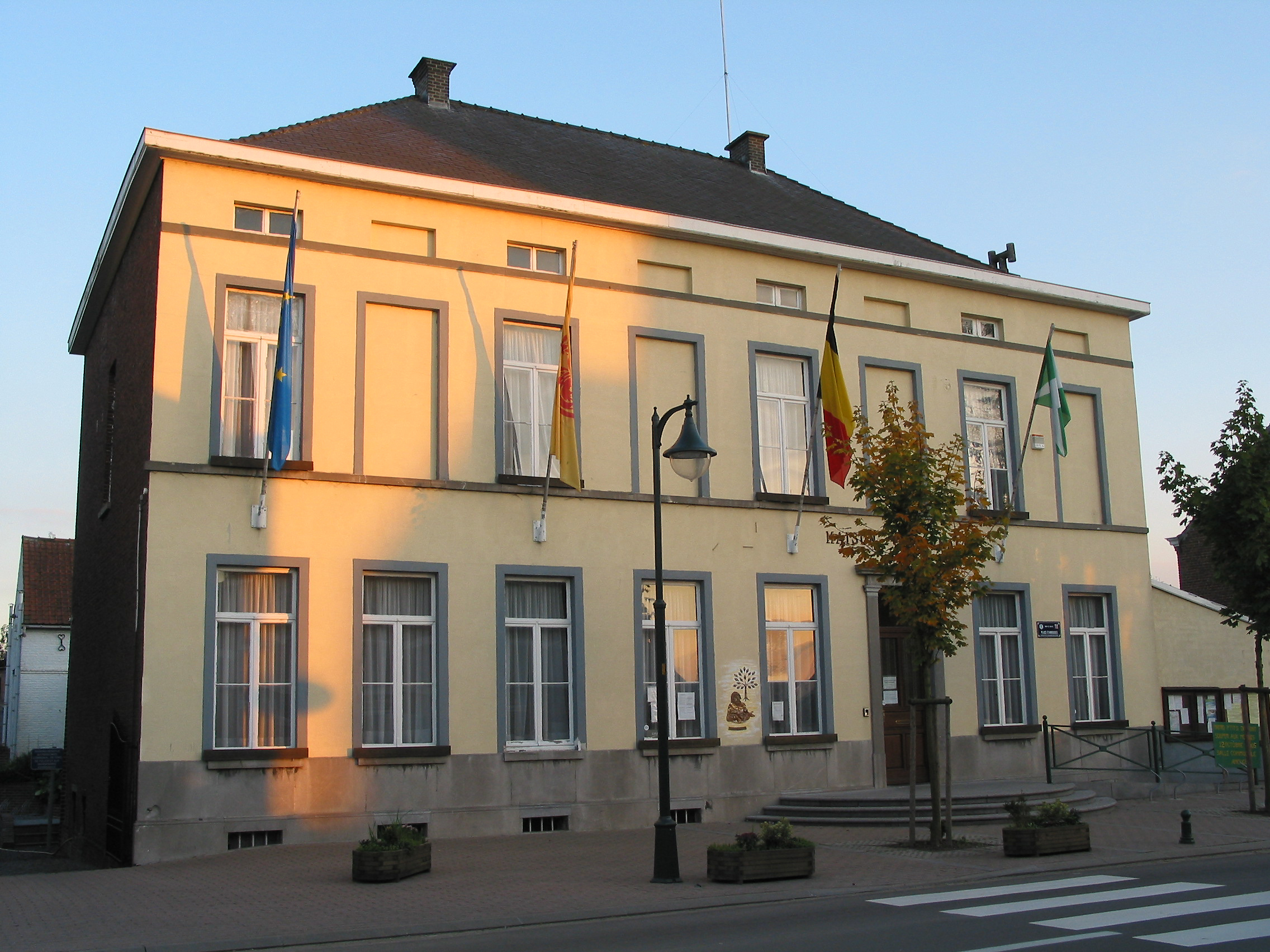
Mont-de-l'Enclus town hall
