= Tommy Leclercq =

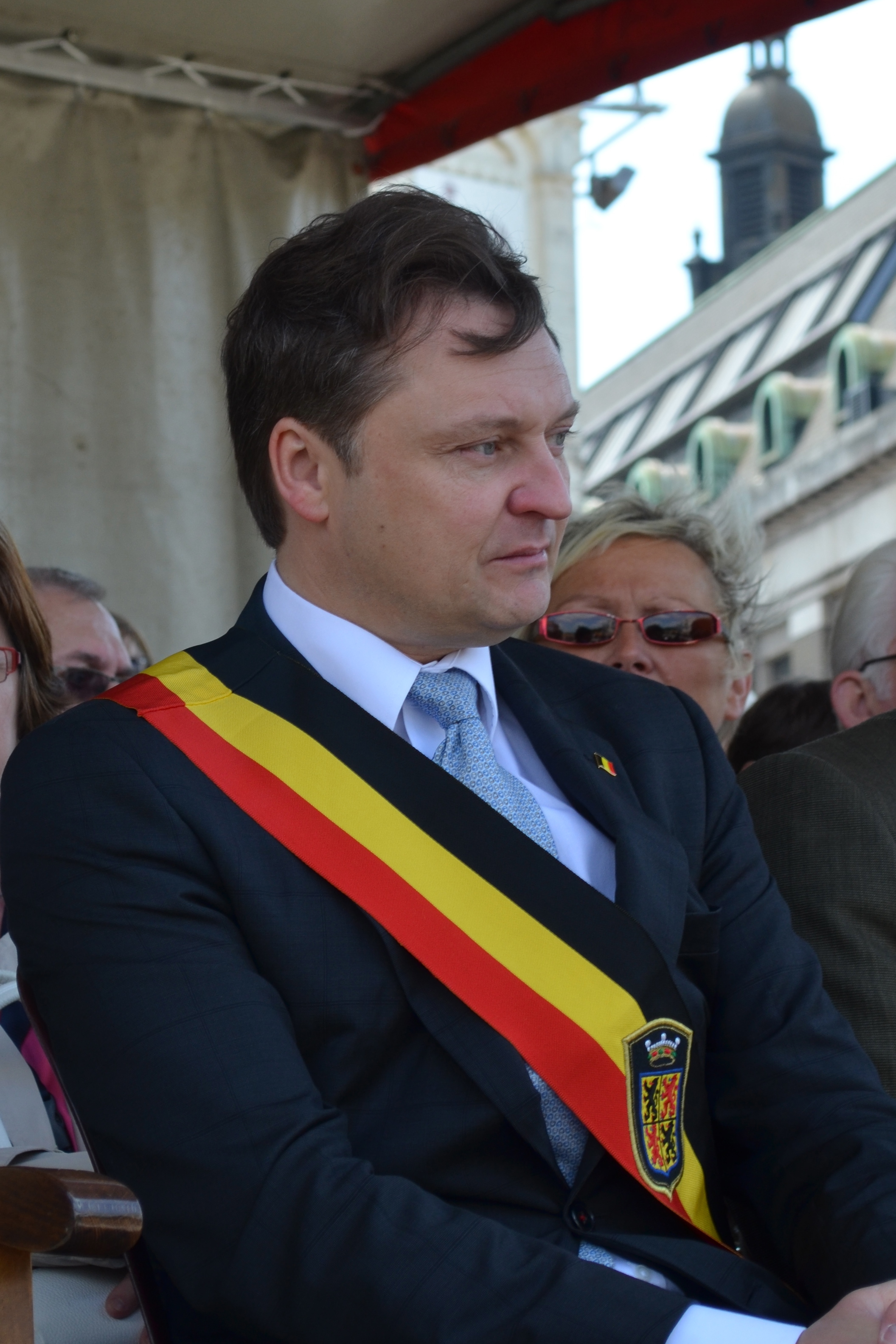
- Tommy Leclercq in 2015

Tommy Leclercq (born 1970) is a Belgian politician who has been governor of the province of Hainaut, Belgium, since March 2013.

== Life ==
Leclercq was born in Lobbes on 19 June 1970.

He obtained a master's degree in Labour Studies at the Université libre de Bruxelles in 1997 and a European Certificate of University Education in Social Labour from Paris 12 Val de Marne University in 1998.

On 28 March 2013 he became governor of the province of Hainaut, at the time the youngest provincial governor in Belgium.

== Publications ==
- La Wallonie vue par les grands écrivains, Editions Luc Pire, 2011
- Lobbes ma commune, self-published, 2012
