= Arrondissement of La Louvière =

Arrondissement in Wallonia, Belgium

Arrondissement of La Louvière Arrondissement de La Louvière
- Arrondissement
- Location of the arrondissement in Hainaut
- Coordinates: 50°23′N 4°09′E
- Country: Belgium
- Region: Wallonia
- Province: Hainaut
- Municipalities: 4

Area
  - Total: 217.88 km^{2} (84.12 sq mi)

Population (January 1, 2021)
  - Total: 141,357
  - Density: 648.78/km^{2} (1,680.3/sq mi)
- Time zone: UTC+1 (CET)
  - Summer (DST): UTC+2 (CEST)

The Arrondissement of La Louvière (French: Arrondissement de La Louvière) is one of the seven administrative arrondissements in the Walloon province of Hainaut, Belgium. The Arrondissement of La Louvière was created in 2019 from the municipalities of La Louvière (formerly from Arrondissement of Soignies) and Binche, Estinnes, and Morlanwelz (formerly from Arrondissement of Thuin).
