= Arrondissement of Tournai =

Arrondissement of Tournai Arrondissement de Tournai
- Former arrondissement
- Location of the arrondissement in Hainaut
- Coordinates: 50.6°N 3.4°E
- Country: Belgium
- Region: Wallonia
- Province: Hainaut
- Municipalities: 10

Area
  - Total: 607.52 km^{2} (234.56 sq mi)

Population (1 January 2017)
  - Total: 146,910
  - Density: 241.82/km^{2} (626.31/sq mi)
- Time zone: UTC+1 (CET)
  - Summer (DST): UTC+2 (CEST)

The Arrondissement of Tournai (French: Arrondissement de Tournai; Dutch: Arrondissement Doornik) is a former arrondissement in the Walloon province of Hainaut, Belgium. It is both an administrative and a judicial arrondissement. However, the Judicial Arrondissement of Tournai also comprises the municipality of Lessines in the Arrondissement of Soignies and all municipalities of the Arrondissement of Ath, with the exception of the municipalities of Brugelette and Chièvres. In 2019 it was merged into the new Arrondissement of Tournai-Mouscron.

== Municipalities ==
The Administrative Arrondissement of Tournai consists of the following municipalities:

- Antoing
- Brunehaut
- Celles
- Estaimpuis
- Leuze-en-Hainaut
- Mont-de-l'Enclus
- Pecq
- Péruwelz
- Rumes
- Tournai
