= Arrondissement of Tournai-Mouscron =

Arrondissement in Wallonia, Belgium

Arrondissement of Tournai-Mouscron Arrondissement de Tournai-Mouscron
- Arrondissement
- Location of the arrondissement in Hainaut
- Coordinates: 50.36°N 3.24°E
- Country: Belgium
- Region: Wallonia
- Province: Hainaut
- Municipalities: 12

Area
  - Total: 708.70 km^{2} (273.63 sq mi)

Population (January 1, 2020)
  - Total: 223,553
  - Density: 315.44/km^{2} (816.99/sq mi)
- Time zone: UTC+1 (CET)

The Arrondissement of Tournai-Mouscron (French: Arrondissement de Tournai-Mouscron; Dutch: Arrondissement Doornik-Moeskroen) is one of the seven administrative arrondissements in the Walloon province of Hainaut, Belgium. The Arrondissement of Tournai-Mouscron was created in 2019 by the merger of the former arrondissements of Tournai and Mouscron.

== Municipalities ==
The Administrative Arrondissement of Mouscron consists of the following municipalities (with their Dutch name):

- Antoing
- Brunehaut
- Celles
- Comines-Warneton (Komen-Waasten)
- Estaimpuis (Steenput)
- Leuze-en-Hainaut
- Mont-de-l'Enclus
- Mouscron (Moeskroen)
- Pecq
- Péruwelz
- Rumes
- Tournai (Doornik)
