= Brunehaut =

Municipality in Hainaut Province, Wallonia, Belgium

Brunehaut Bruniô (Picard)
- Municipality
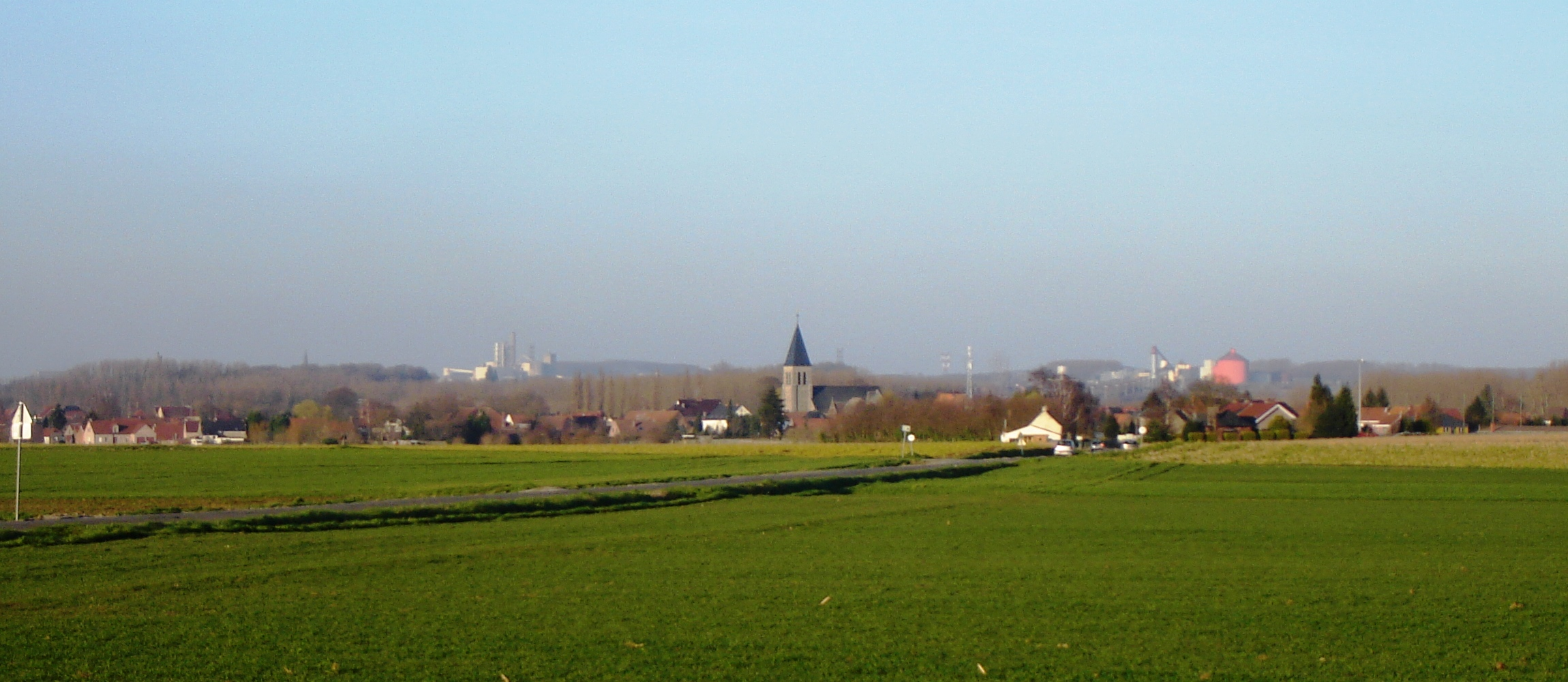

- Flag Coat of arms

- Location of Brunehaut in Hainaut
- Interactive map of Brunehaut
- Location in Belgium
- Coordinates: 50°31′N 03°25′E
- Country: Belgium
- Community: French Community
- Region: Wallonia
- Province: Hainaut
- Arrondissement: Tournai-Mouscron

Government
  - Mayor: Pierre Wacquiez
  - Governing party: PS

Area
  - Total: 46.55 km^{2} (17.97 sq mi)

Population (2026-01-01)
  - Total: 8,094
  - Density: 173.9/km^{2} (450.3/sq mi)
- Postal codes: 7620-7624
- NIS code: 57093
- Area codes: 069
- Website: www.brunehaut.be

Brunehaut (French pronunciation: [bʁyn(ə)o]; Picard: Brunéo; Walloon: Bruniô) is a municipality of Wallonia located in the province of Hainaut, Belgium.

The municipality consists of the following districts: Bléharies (town centre), Guignies, Hollain, Howardries, Jollain-Merlin, Laplaigne, Lesdain, Rongy, and Wez-Velvain.

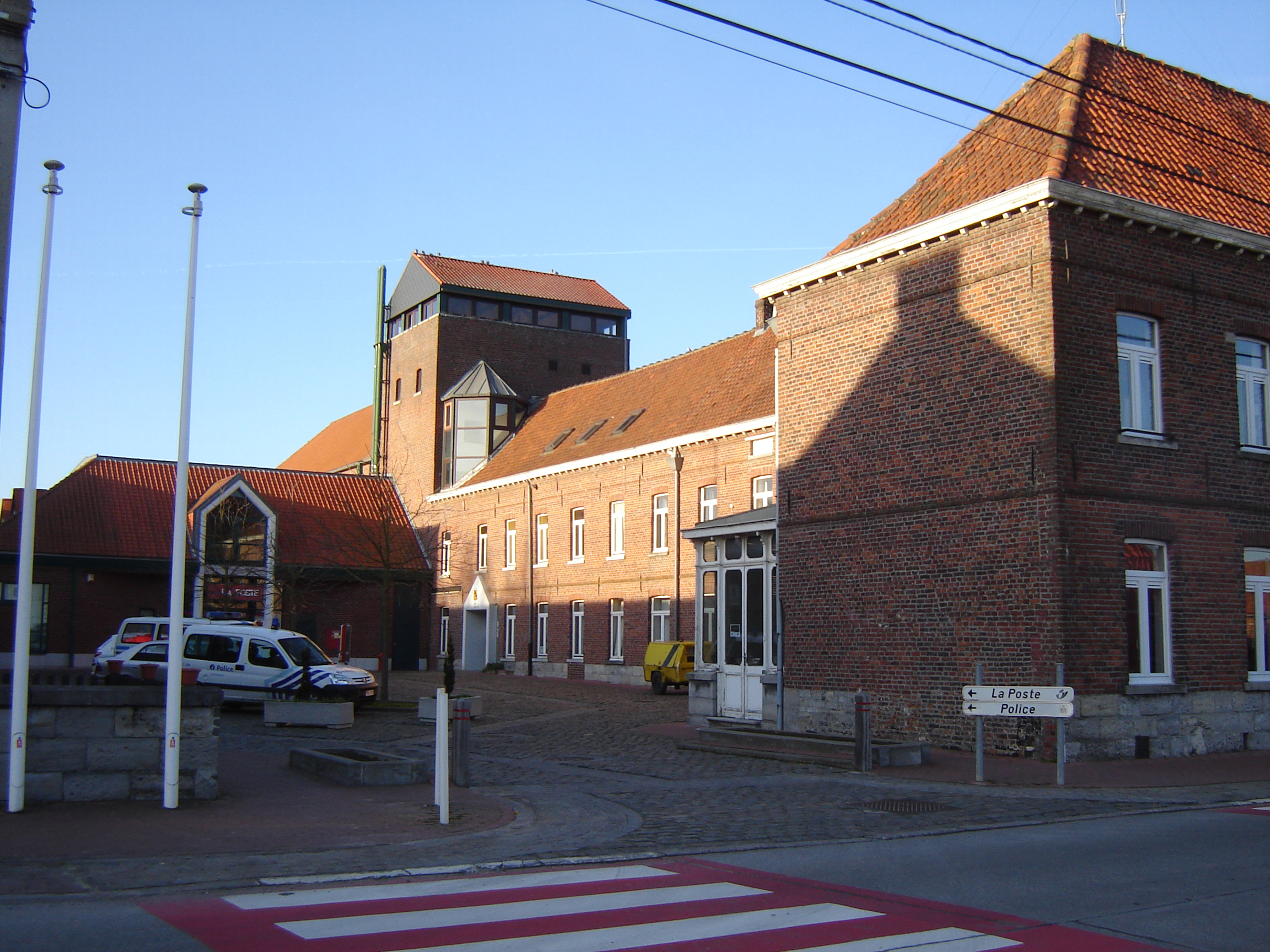
Brunehaut town hall

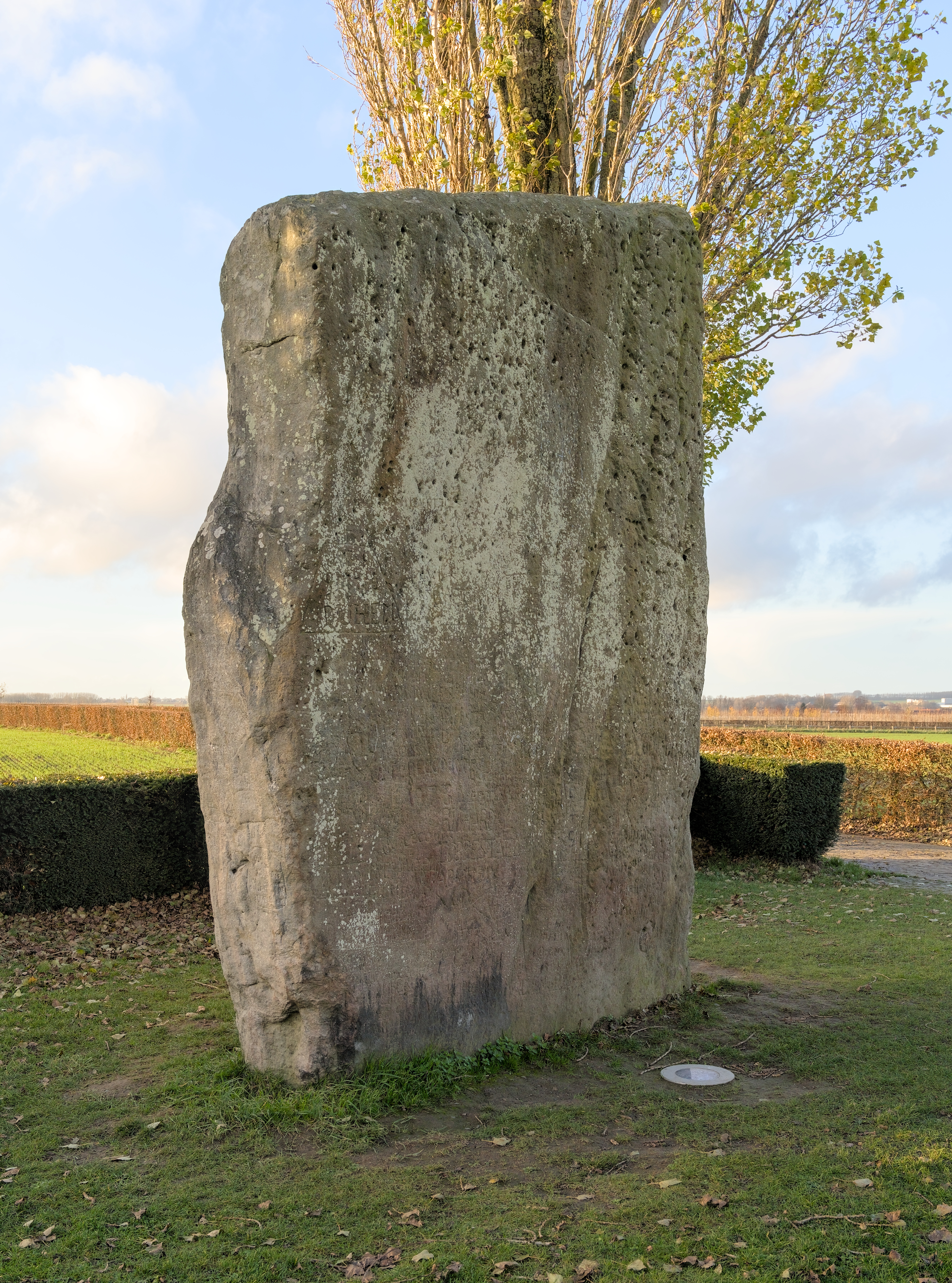
Pierre Brunehaut menhir

== Twin towns ==
Brunehaut is twinned with Amfreville, Calvados in France.
