= Rumes =

Municipality in Hainaut Province, Wallonia, Belgium

Rumes Reme (Picard)
- Municipality
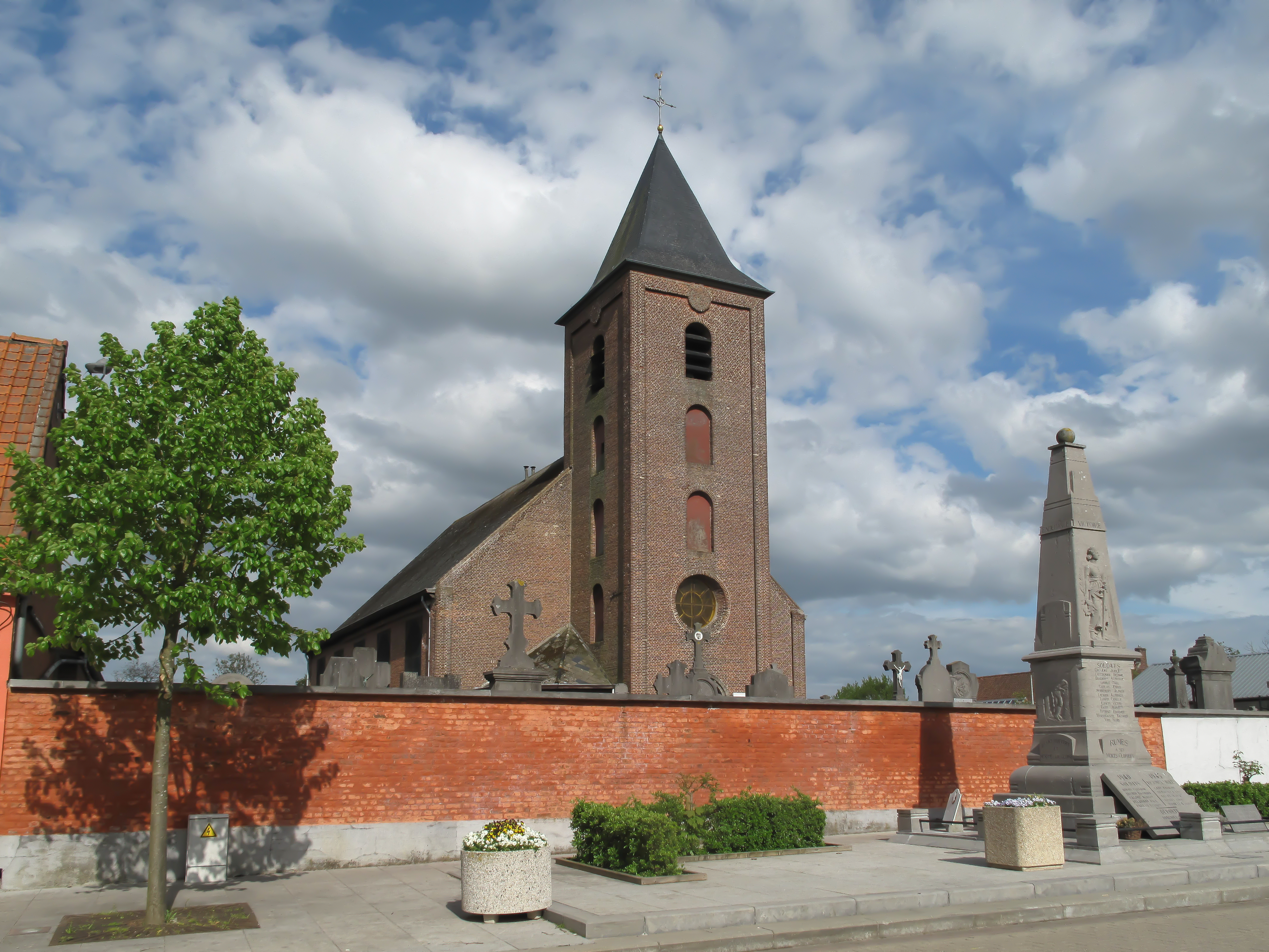

- Flag Coat of arms

- The municipality in the province of Hainaut
- Interactive map of Rumes
- Location in Belgium
- Coordinates: 50°33′N 03°18′E
- Country: Belgium
- Community: French Community
- Region: Wallonia
- Province: Hainaut
- Arrondissement: Tournai-Mouscron

Government
  - Mayor: Michel Casterman (CDH) (IC)
  - Governing party: Intérêts communaux

Area
  - Total: 24.01 km^{2} (9.27 sq mi)

Population (2026-01-01)
  - Total: 5,351
  - Density: 222.9/km^{2} (577.2/sq mi)
- Postal codes: 7610-7618
- NIS code: 57072
- Area codes: 069
- Website: www.rumes-online.be

Rumes (French pronunciation: [ʁym]; Picard: Reme) is a municipality of Wallonia located in the province of Hainaut, Belgium.

On 1 January 2006 the municipality had 5,112 inhabitants. The total area is 23.72 km^{2}, giving a population density of 216 inhabitants per km^{2}.

The municipality consists of the following districts: La Glanerie, Rumes, and Taintignies.
