= Péruwelz =

City in Hainaut Province, Wallonia, Belgium

Péruwelz Piérwé (Picard)
- Municipality
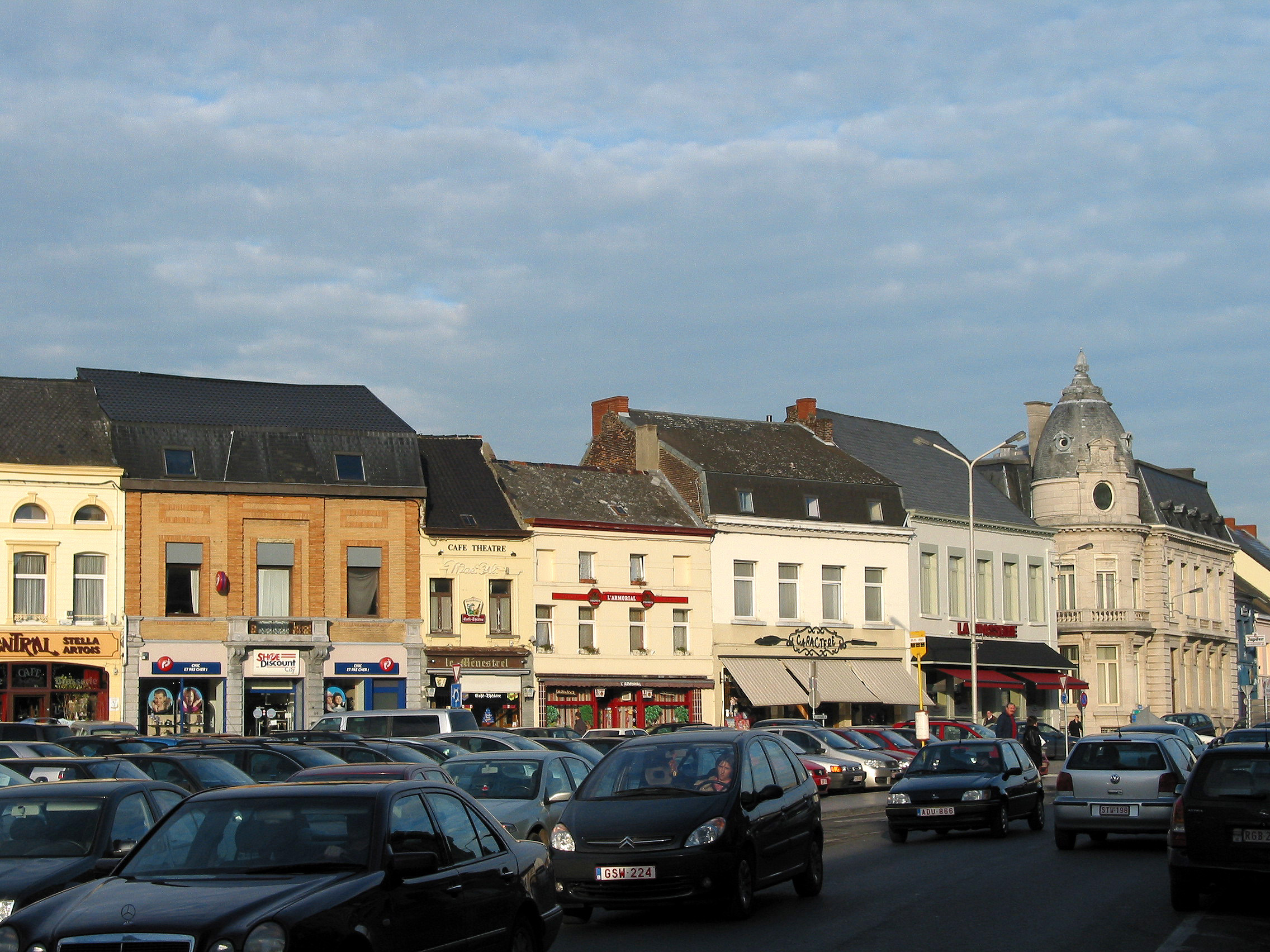

- Flag Coat of arms

- Municipality in the province of Hainaut
- Interactive map of Péruwelz
- Location in Belgium
- Coordinates: 50°31′N 03°35′E
- Country: Belgium
- Community: French Community
- Region: Wallonia
- Province: Hainaut
- Arrondissement: Tournai-Mouscron

Government
  - Mayor: Vincent Palermo (MR)
  - Governing party: MR-IC (indépendants) - Ecolo

Area
  - Total: 61 km^{2} (24 sq mi)

Population (2018-01-01)
  - Total: 17,113
  - Density: 280/km^{2} (730/sq mi)
- Postal codes: 7600-7608
- NIS code: 57064
- Area codes: 069
- Website: www.peruwelz.be

Péruwelz (French: [pe.ʁ(y)we] or [pɛʁ.we]; Picard: Piérwé [pi.eˈʀwe]; Walloon: Perwé-e-Hinnot) is a city and municipality of Wallonia located in the province of Hainaut, Belgium.

On 1 January 2018 Péruwelz had a total population of 17,113. The total area is 60.56 km^{2} which gives a population density of 280 inhabitants per km^{2}.

This municipality is more specifically situated in Western Hainaut, also called Picardy Wallonia. Péruwelz is also near France, near the cities of "Condé-sur-l'Escaut", "Vieux Condé", "Hergnies", and is near the forest of Bon-Secours, the location of the castle of (l')Hermitage.

== Reputed natives ==
- Jean Absil (1893–1974), composer, organist, and professor
- Louis Constant Wairy (1778–1845), chief valet of Napoleon Bonaparte. Published elaborate Memoirs, relating his experiences at the French Imperial Court.

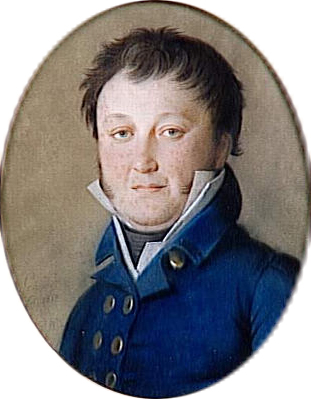
Portrait of Louis Constant Wairy (1813)

== Composition of the municipality ==

The current municipality of Péruwelz was formed in 1977 when the following ten municipalities were joined:

- I. Péruwelz
- II. Bon-Secours
- III. Roucourt
- IV. Bury (site of Bitremont Castle, or the Château de Bitremont)
- V. Braffe
- VI. Baugnies
- VII. Wasmes-Audemez-Briffœil
- VIII. Brasménil
- IX. Wiers
- X. Callenelle

The municipality also includes these villages:

- (XI.) Briffœil
- (XII.) Audemez
- (XIII.) Ringies
- (XIV.) Ponange

== Fountains ==
Péruwelz has a number of natural springs:

- The Dubuisson-Copin's washing-place fountain is in the communal gardens created in 1912. This fountain is the busiest.
- De la Ferté Fountain
- Du Flassart fountain, on the little place since 1898.
- Jaunay-Clan fountain. Jaunay-Clan is the name of the commune paired with Péruwelz. This fountain is made of stones from Jaunay-Clan.
- Du Maréchal fountain. In the past named "Magrite fountain", "des Quatre-Cailloux fountain", and "des cailloux gris posés de chant fountain" until it was named "Du Maréchal fountain" in 1887 after its restoration.
- Tanchou fountain.
- De Verquesies fountain

Certain springs are not potable, tests are performed every day.

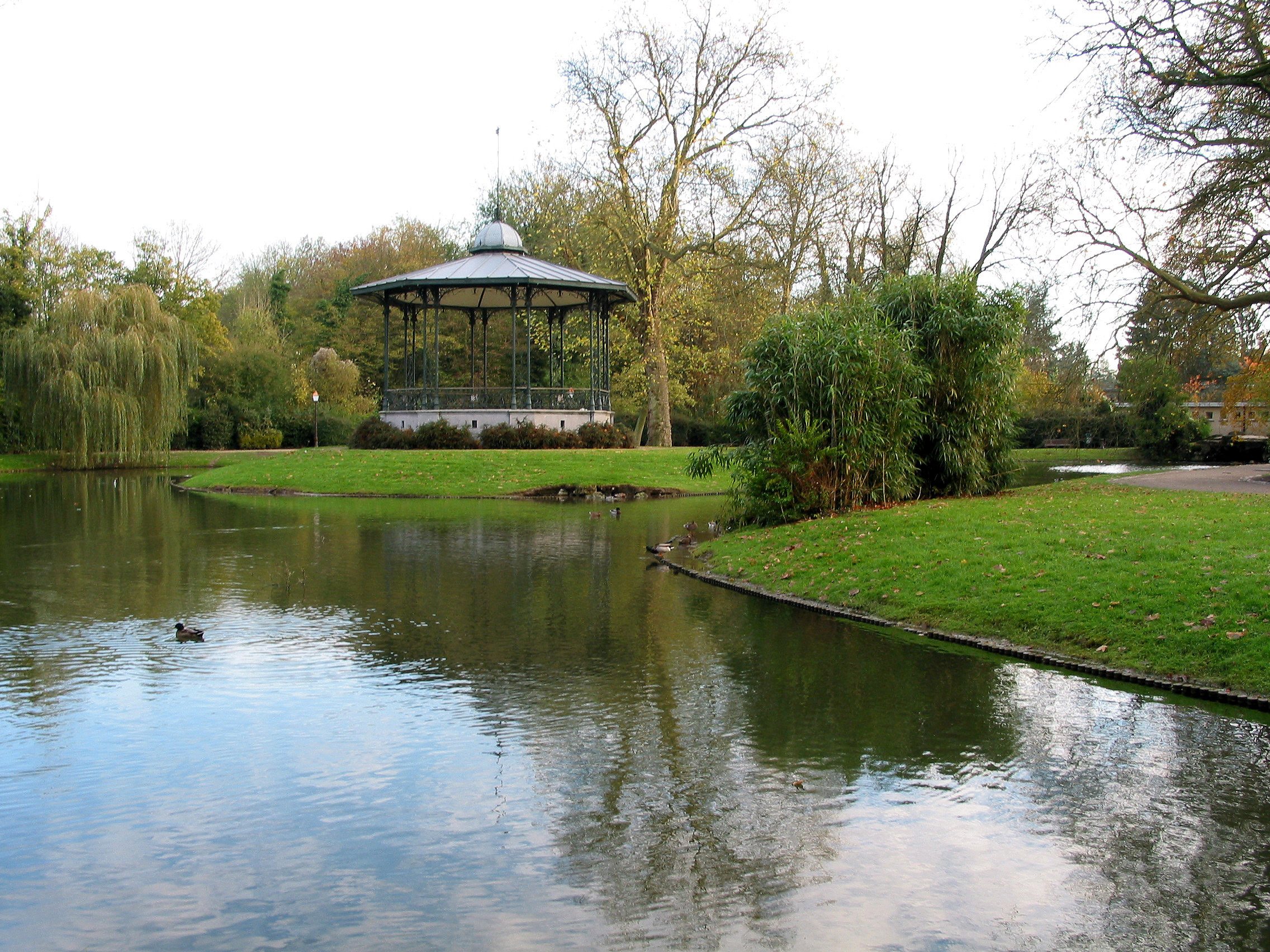
Simon Garden

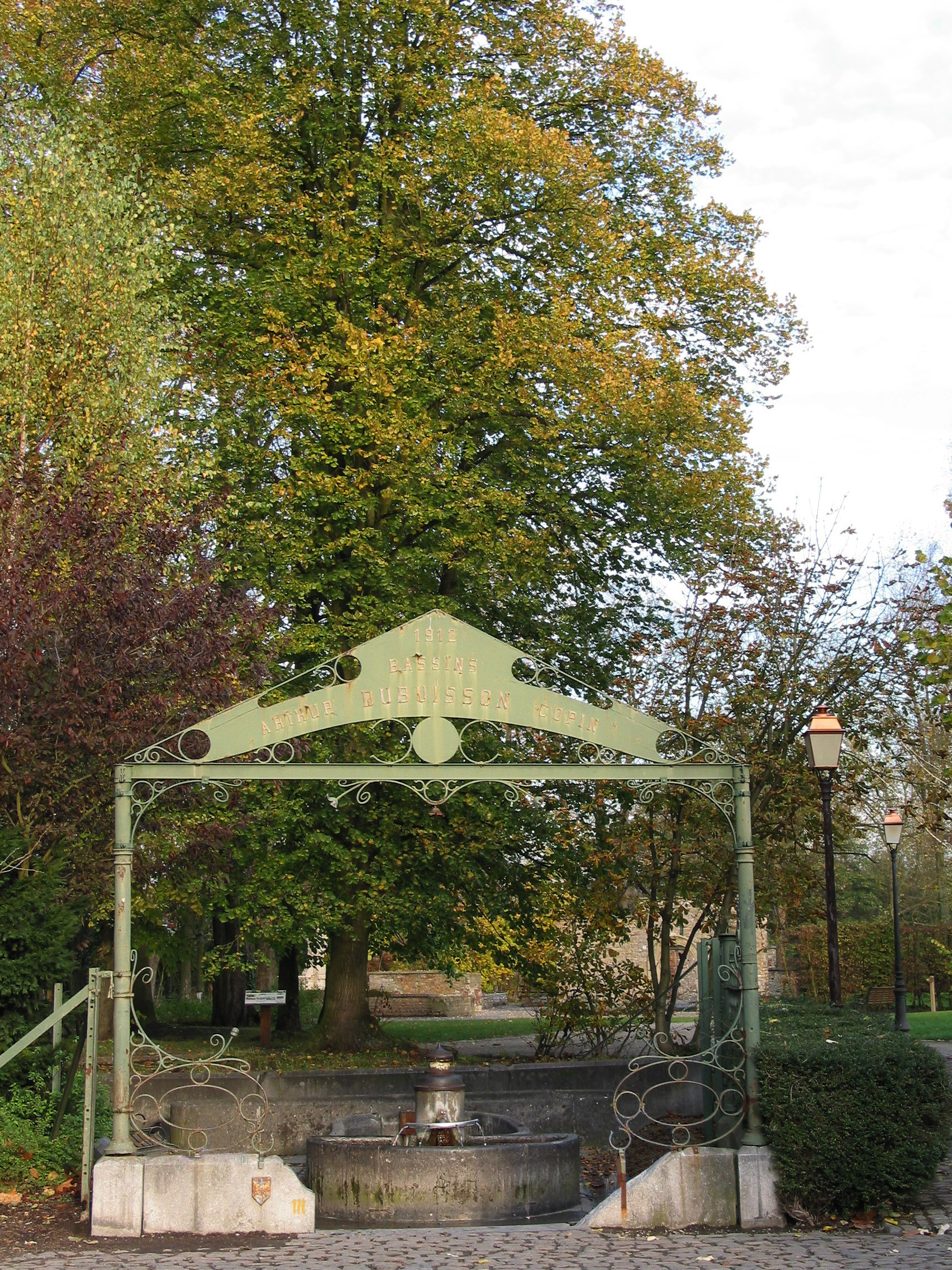
Dubuisson-Copin's fountain
