= Chièvres =

City in Hainaut Province, Wallonia, Belgium

Chièvres Chieuve (Picard)
- Municipality
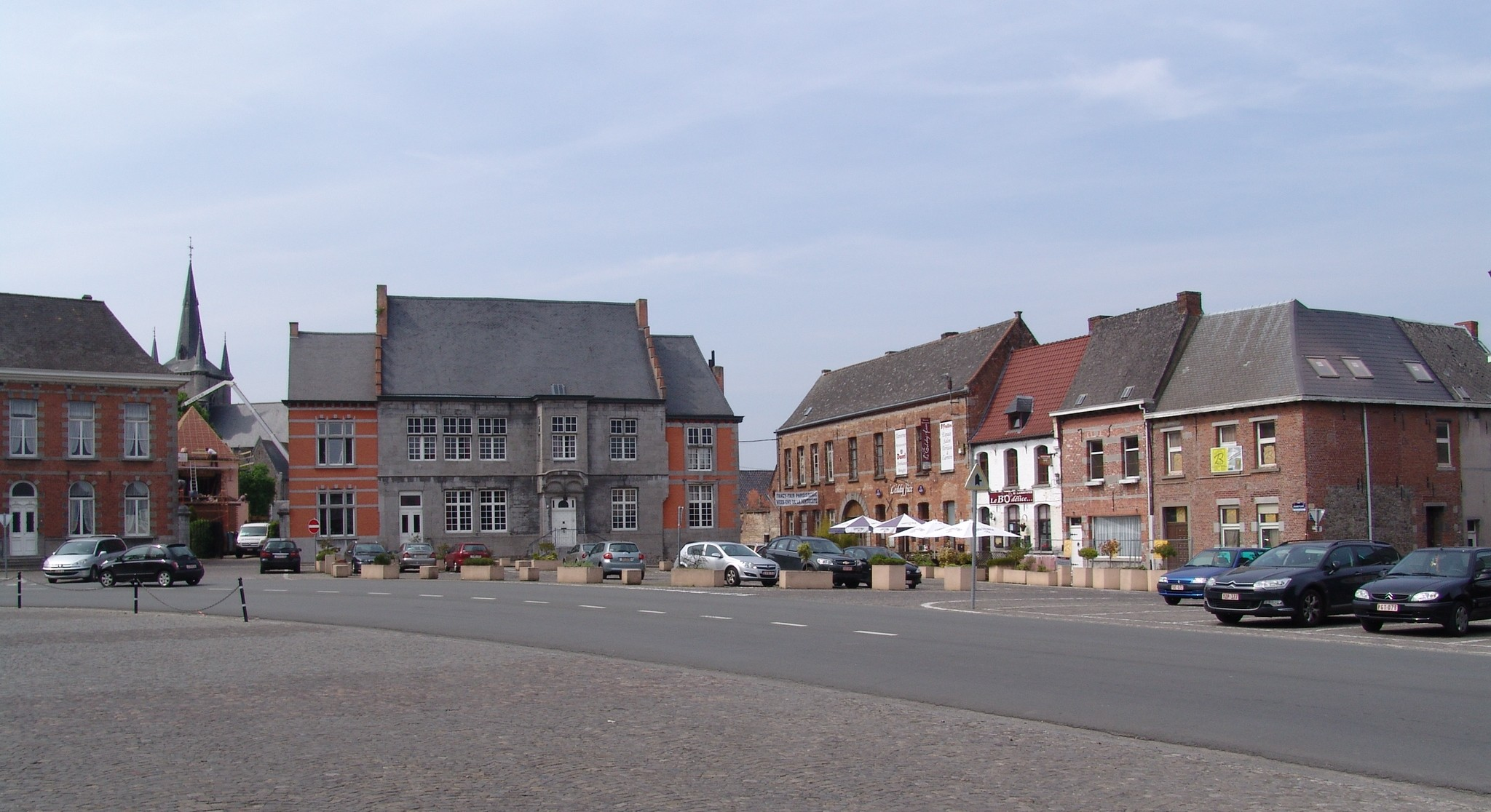
- Market Place of Chièvres

- Flag Coat of arms

- Location of Chièvres in Hainaut
- Interactive map of Chièvres
- Location in Belgium
- Coordinates: 50°35′N 03°48′E
- Country: Belgium
- Community: French Community
- Region: Wallonia
- Province: Hainaut
- Arrondissement: Ath

Government
  - Mayor: Olivier Hartiel (PS)
  - Governing party: PS - Ecolo

Area
  - Total: 47.37 km^{2} (18.29 sq mi)

Population (2018-01-01)
  - Total: 6,899
  - Density: 145.6/km^{2} (377.2/sq mi)
- Postal codes: 7950, 7951
- NIS code: 51014
- Area codes: 068
- Website: www.chievres.be

Chièvres (French pronunciation: [ʃjɛvʁ]; Picard: Chieuve) is a city and municipality of Wallonia located in the province of Hainaut, Belgium.

On January 1, 2018, Chièvres had a total population of 6,899. The total area is 46.91 km^{2} which gives a population density of 150 inhabitants per km^{2}. Chièvres Air Base is located in the municipality.

The municipality consists of the following districts: Chièvres, Grosage, Huissignies, Ladeuze, Tongre-Saint-Martin, and Tongre-Notre-Dame.

In 1918 the town was delivered by the 5th Battalion of the Gordon Highlanders from four years of military occupation during the First World War. The event was commemorated by the naming of one of the town's main streets as Rue Dudley Gordon after the battalion's Lieutenant-Colonel, the Lord Dudley Gordon, who was presented with the key to the town of Chièvres. In return, a present was made to the town of the flag under which the 5th Battalion had fought since 1915. It is twinned with Ellon in Aberdeenshire, Scotland.

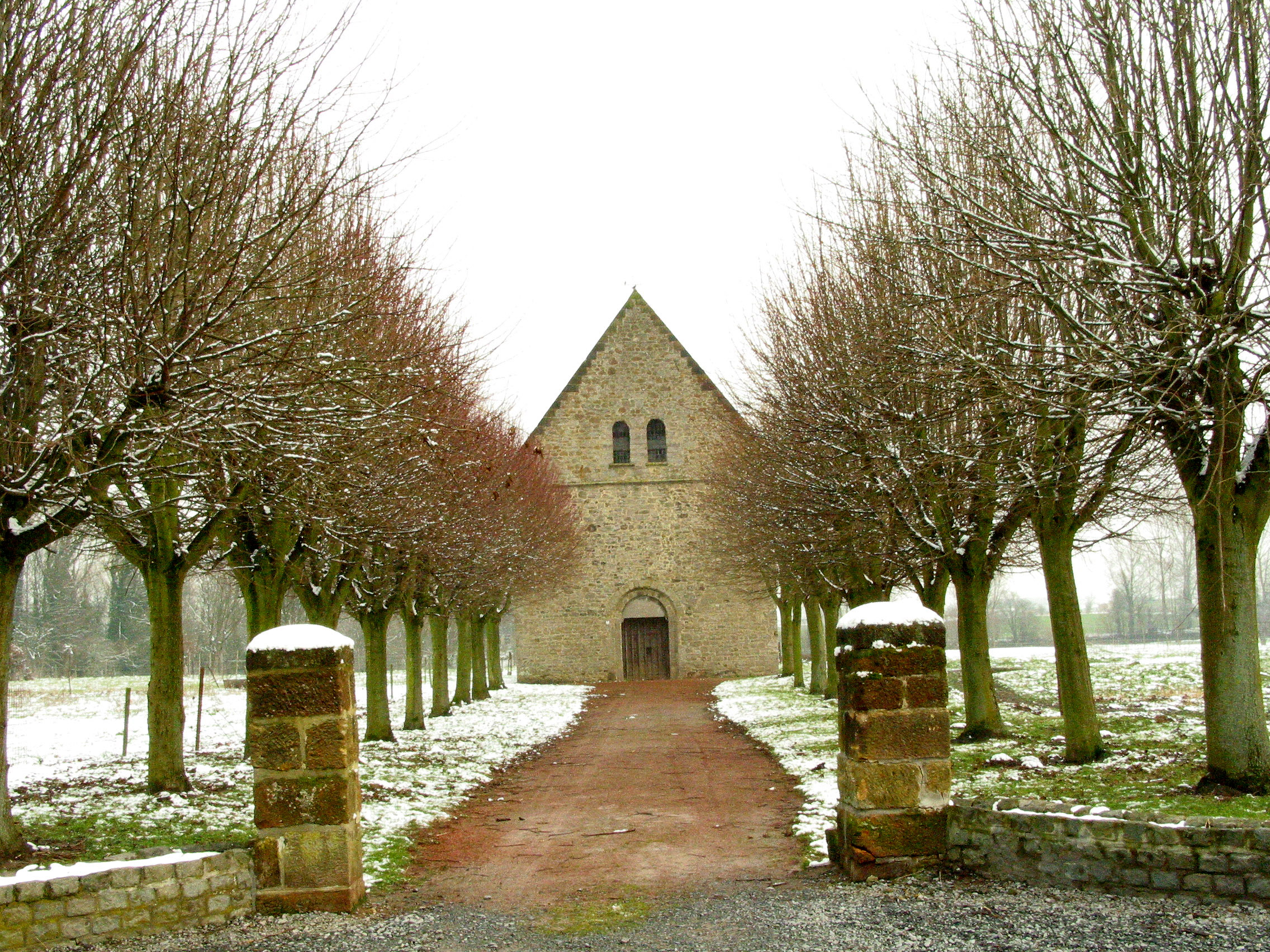
The 12th-century chapel of St John the Baptist
