= Arrondissement of Diksmuide =

Arrondissement of Diksmuide Arrondissement Diksmuide
- Arrondissement
- Location of the arrondissement in West Flanders
- Coordinates: 51.0°N 2.9°E
- Country: Belgium
- Region: Flanders
- Province: West Flanders
- Municipalities: 5

Area
  - Total: 362.42 km^{2} (139.93 sq mi)

Population (1 January 2017)
  - Total: 51,250
  - Density: 141.4/km^{2} (366.3/sq mi)
- Time zone: UTC+1 (CET)
  - Summer (DST): UTC+2 (CEST)

The Arrondissement of Diksmuide (Dutch: Arrondissement Diksmuide; French: Arrondissement de Dixmude) is one of the eight administrative arrondissements in the Province of West Flanders, Belgium. It is one of the two arrondissements that form the Judicial Arrondissement of Veurne.

== Municipalities ==
The Administrative Arrondissement of Diksmuide consists of the following municipalities:

- Diksmuide
- Houthulst
- Koekelare
- Kortemark
- Lo-Reninge
