= Arrondissement of Mons =

Arrondissement in Wallonia, Belgium

Arrondissement of Mons Arrondissement de Mons
- Arrondissement
- Location of the arrondissement in Hainaut
- Coordinates: 50.45°N 3.85°E
- Country: Belgium
- Region: Wallonia
- Province: Hainaut
- Municipalities: 13

Area
  - Total: 583.99 km^{2} (225.48 sq mi)

Population (1 January 2017)
  - Total: 258,431
  - Density: 442.53/km^{2} (1,146.1/sq mi)
- Time zone: UTC+1 (CET)
  - Summer (DST): UTC+2 (CEST)

The Arrondissement of Mons (French: Arrondissement de Mons; Dutch: Arrondissement Bergen) is one of the seven administrative arrondissements in the Walloon province of Hainaut, Belgium.

It is both an administrative and a judicial arrondissement. However, the Judicial Arrondissement of Mons also comprises all municipalities of the Arrondissement of Soignies but one (Lessines), as well as the municipalities of Brugelette en Chièvres of the Arrondissement of Ath.

== Municipalities ==
The Administrative Arrondissement of Mons consists of the following municipalities:

- Boussu
- Colfontaine
- Dour
- Frameries
- Hensies
- Honnelles
- Jurbise
- Lens
- Mons
- Quaregnon
- Quévy
- Quiévrain
- Saint-Ghislain
