= Arrondissement of Charleroi =

Arrondissement in Wallonia, Belgium

Arrondissement of Charleroi Arrondissement de Charleroi
- Arrondissement
- Location of the arrondissement in Hainaut
- Coordinates: 50.45°N 4.45°E
- Country: Belgium
- Region: Wallonia
- Province: Hainaut
- Municipalities: 12

Area
  - Total: 472.19 km^{2} (182.31 sq mi)

Population (1 January 2017)
  - Total: 430,128
  - Density: 910.92/km^{2} (2,359.3/sq mi)
- Time zone: UTC+1 (CET)
  - Summer (DST): UTC+2 (CEST)

The Arrondissement of Charleroi (French: Arrondissement de Charleroi; Dutch: Arrondissement Charleroi) is one of the seven administrative arrondissements in the Walloon province of Hainaut, Belgium. It is both an administrative and a judicial arrondissement. However, the Judicial Arrondissement of Charleroi also comprises the municipalities of the Arrondissement of Thuin.

== Municipalities ==
The Administrative Arrondissement of Charleroi consists of the following municipalities:

=== Since 2019 ===
- Aiseau-Presles
- Chapelle-lez-Herlaimont
- Charleroi
- Châtelet
- Courcelles
- Farciennes
- Fleurus
- Fontaine-l'Evêque
- Gerpinnes
- Les Bons Villers
- Montigny-le-Tilleul
- Pont-à-Celles

=== Before 2019 ===
- Aiseau-Presles
- Chapelle-lez-Herlaimont
- Charleroi
- Châtelet
- Courcelles
- Farciennes
- Fleurus
- Fontaine-l'Evêque
- Gerpinnes
- Les Bons Villers
- Manage
- Montigny-le-Tilleul
- Pont-à-Celles
- Seneffe

The municipalities of Manage and Seneffe are transferred on January 1, 2019 to the Arrondissement of Soignies.
