= Arrondissement of Marche-en-Famenne =

Arrondissement in Wallonia, Belgium

Arrondissement of Marche-en-Famenne Arrondissement de Marche-en-Famenne
- Arrondissement
- Location of the arrondissement in Luxembourg
- Coordinates: 50.25°N 5.45°E
- Country: Belgium
- Region: Wallonia
- Province: Luxembourg
- Municipalities: 9

Area
  - Total: 953.69 km^{2} (368.22 sq mi)

Population (1 January 2017)
  - Total: 55,952
  - Density: 58.669/km^{2} (151.95/sq mi)
- Time zone: UTC+1 (CET)
  - Summer (DST): UTC+2 (CEST)

The Arrondissement of Marche-en-Famenne (French: Arrondissement de Marche-en-Famenne; Dutch: Arrondissement Marche-en-Famenne) is one of the five administrative arrondissements in the Walloon province of Luxembourg, Belgium. It is both an administrative and a judicial arrondissement. However, the Judicial Arrondissement of Marche-en-Famenne also comprises the municipalities of Gouvy, Houffalize and Vielsalm in the Arrondissement of Bastogne.

== Municipalities ==
The Administrative Arrondissement of Marche-en-Famenne consists of the following municipalities:

- Durbuy
- Érezée
- Hotton
- La Roche-en-Ardenne
- Manhay
- Marche-en-Famenne
- Nassogne
- Rendeux
- Tenneville
