= Arrondissement of Eeklo =

Arrondissement in East Flanders

Arrondissement of Eeklo Arrondissement Eeklo
- Arrondissement
- Location of the arrondissement in East Flanders
- Coordinates: 51.2°N 3.6°E
- Country: Belgium
- Region: Flanders
- Province: East Flanders
- Municipalities: 6

Area
  - Total: 333.83 km^{2} (128.89 sq mi)

Population (1 January 2017)
  - Total: 84,113
  - Density: 251.96/km^{2} (652.58/sq mi)
- Time zone: UTC+1 (CET)
  - Summer (DST): UTC+2 (CEST)

The Arrondissement of Eeklo (Dutch: Arrondissement Eeklo; French: Arrondissement d'Eeklo) is one of the six administrative arrondissements in the Province of East Flanders, Belgium. It is one of the two arrondissements that form the Judicial Arrondissement of Ghent.

== Municipalities ==
The Administrative Arrondissement of Eeklo consists of the following municipalities:

- Assenede
- Eeklo
- Kaprijke
- Maldegem
- Sint-Laureins
- Zelzate
