= Arrondissement of Ath =

Arrondissement in Wallonia, Belgium

Arrondissement of Ath Arrondissement d'Ath
- Arrondissement
- Location of the arrondissement in Hainaut
- Coordinates: 50.6°N 3.75°E
- Country: Belgium
- Region: Wallonia
- Province: Hainaut
- Municipalities: 11

Area
  - Total: 667.94 km^{2} (257.89 sq mi)

Population (1 January 2017)
  - Total: 86,719
  - Density: 129.83/km^{2} (336.26/sq mi)
- Time zone: UTC+1 (CET)
  - Summer (DST): UTC+2 (CEST)

The Arrondissement of Ath (French: Arrondissement d'Ath; Dutch: Arrondissement Aat) is one of the seven administrative arrondissements in the Walloon province of Hainaut, Belgium. It is not a judicial arrondissement. Two of its municipalities, Brugelette and Chièvres, are part of the Judicial Arrondissement of Mons, while the others are part of the Judicial Arrondissement of Tournai.

== Municipalities ==
The Administrative Arrondissement of Ath consists of the following municipalities:

=== Since 2019 ===
- Ath
- Belœil
- Bernissart
- Brugelette
- Chièvres
- Ellezelles
- Enghien
- Flobecq
- Frasnes-lez-Anvaing
- Lessines
- Silly

=== Before 2019 ===
- Ath
- Belœil
- Bernissart
- Brugelette
- Chièvres
- Ellezelles
- Flobecq
- Frasnes-lez-Anvaing

The three municipalities of the Arrondissement of Soignies (Enghien, Lessines and Silly) are integrated into the Arrondissement of Ath on January 1, 2019.
