= Arrondissement of Thuin =

Arrondissement in Wallonia, Belgium

Arrondissement of Thuin Arrondissement de Thuin
- Arrondissement
- Location of the arrondissement in Hainaut
- Coordinates: 50.3°N 4.25°E
- Country: Belgium
- Region: Wallonia
- Province: Hainaut
- Municipalities: 11

Area
  - Total: 780.08 km^{2} (301.19 sq mi)

Population (1 January 2017)
  - Total: 151,699
  - Density: 194.47/km^{2} (503.66/sq mi)
- Time zone: UTC+1 (CET)
  - Summer (DST): UTC+2 (CEST)

The Arrondissement of Thuin (French: Arrondissement de Thuin; Dutch: Arrondissement Thuin) is one of the seven administrative arrondissements in the Walloon province of Hainaut, Belgium.

The Administrative Arrondissement of Thuin consists of the following municipalities:

Since 2019

- Anderlues
- Beaumont
- Chimay
- Erquelinnes
- Froidchapelle
- Ham-sur-Heure-Nalinnes
- Lobbes
- Merbes-le-Château
- Momignies
- Sivry-Rance
- Thuin

Before 2019

- Anderlues
- Beaumont
- Binche
- Chimay
- Erquelinnes
- Estinnes
- Froidchapelle
- Ham-sur-Heure-Nalinnes
- Lobbes
- Merbes-le-Château
- Momignies
- Morlanwelz
- Sivry-Rance
- Thuin

The municipalities of Binche, Estinnes and Morlanwelz were detached from the Arrondissement on 1 January 2019 to create the new Arrondissement of La Louvière.
