= Arrondissement of Soignies =

Arrondissement in Wallonia, Belgium

Arrondissement of Soignies Arrondissement de Soignies
- Arrondissement
- Location of the arrondissement in Hainaut
- Coordinates: 50.6°N 4.1°E
- Country: Belgium
- Region: Wallonia
- Province: Hainaut
- Municipalities: 6

Area
  - Total: 354.92 km^{2} (137.04 sq mi)

Population (1 January 2017)
  - Total: 189,800
  - Density: 534.8/km^{2} (1,385/sq mi)
- Time zone: UTC+1 (CET)
  - Summer (DST): UTC+2 (CEST)

The Arrondissement of Soignies (French: Arrondissement de Soignies; Dutch: Arrondissement Zinnik) is one of the seven administrative arrondissements in the Walloon province of Hainaut, Belgium.

The Arrondissement of Soignies consists of the following municipalities:

Since 2019

- Braine-le-Comte
- Écaussinnes
- Le Rœulx
- Manage
- Soignies
- Seneffe

Before 2019

- Braine-le-Comte
- Écaussinnes
- Enghien
- La Louvière
- Le Roeulx
- Lessines
- Silly
- Soignies

The municipalities of Enghien, Lessines and Silly are transferred on January 1, 2019 to the Arrondissement of Ath while the municipalities of Manage and Seneffe from the Arrondissement of Charleroi are integrated on the same date into the Arrondissement of Soignies. La Louvière is detached from the Arrondissement on the same date to create the new Arrondissement of La Louvière.
