= Hainaut Province =

Province of Belgium

Hainaut Hinnot (Walloon) Hénau (Picard) Heynowes
- Province of Belgium
- Flag Coat of arms Brandmark

- Interactive map of Hainaut
- Coordinates: 50°30′N 3°55′E
- Country: Belgium
- Region: Wallonia
- Capital: Mons
- Largest city: Charleroi

Government
  - Governor: Tommy Leclercq

Area
  - Total: 3,813 km^{2} (1,472 sq mi)

Population (1 January 2024)
  - Total: 1,360,074
  - Density: 356.7/km^{2} (923.8/sq mi)

GDP
  - Total: €44.184 billion (2024)
  - Per capita: €32,275 (2024)
- ISO 3166 code: BE-WHT
- HDI (2021): 0.893 very high · 11th of 11
- Website: www.hainaut.be

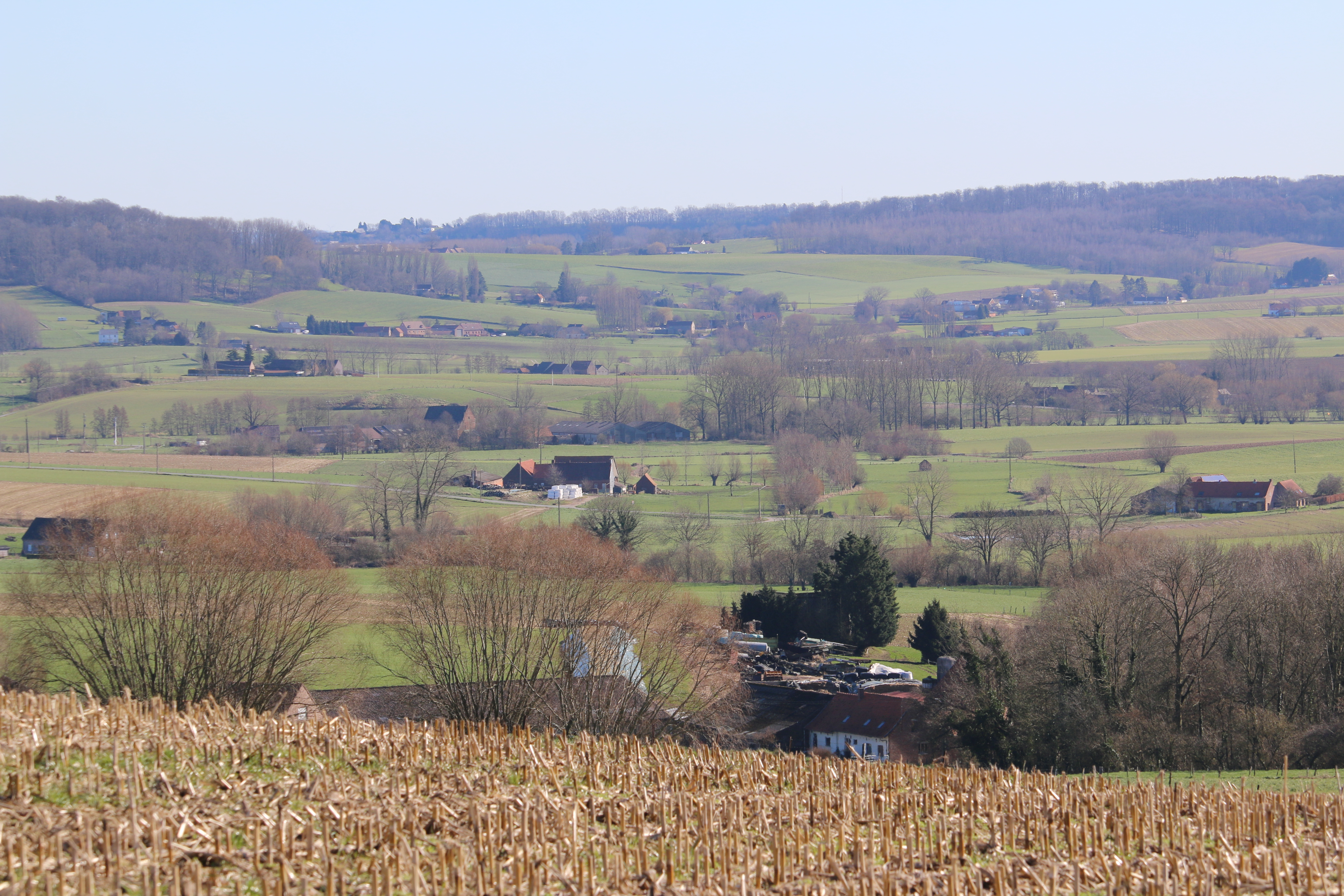
Pays des Collines

Hainaut, (Note: /eɪˈnoʊ/ ay-NOH, also US: /heɪˈ-, ɛˈ-/ hay-, eh-, UK: /ˈ(h)eɪnoʊ/ (H)AY-noh; French: [ɛno]; Dutch: Henegouwen [ˈɦeːnəɣʌu.ə(n)]; Walloon: Hinnot; Picard: Hénau) historically also known as Heynault in English, is the westernmost province of Wallonia, the French-speaking region of Belgium.

To its south lies the French department of Nord, while within Belgium it borders (clockwise from the north) on the Flemish provinces of West Flanders, East Flanders, Flemish Brabant and the Walloon provinces of Walloon Brabant and Namur.

Its capital is Mons (Dutch: Bergen) and the most populous city is Charleroi, the province's urban, economic and cultural hub, the financial capital of Hainaut and the fifth largest city in the country by population. Hainaut is one of the two only Belgian provinces whose capital is not its largest city; the other one is Walloon Brabant. Hainaut has an area of 3,831 km^{2} (1,479 sq mi) and as of January 2024 a population of over 1.36 million. Another notable city is Tournai (Dutch Doornik) on the Scheldt river, one of the oldest cities in Belgium and the first capital of the Frankish Empire.

Hainaut province has a rolling landscape, except for the very southern part, the so-called Boot of Hainaut, which is quite hilly and belongs to the Ardennes and its foothills Fagne and the Condroz.

The village of L'Escaillère in the utmost southeastern corner, at an altitude of 365 metres, is the highest point of the province.

In the Boot of Hainaut on the border of Namur province the artificial five Eau d'Heure lakes are situated, the largest lake area of Belgium.

A well-known region is the Borinage, the old coal mining region around the city of Mons. Also well-known is the Pays des Collines (English: "Hill Country"), a low hilly area forming one natural region with the Flemish Ardennes in the East Flanders province.

== Language ==
In addition to the main language French, Picard is spoken in the western and central parts of the province, while in the eastern part a mixture of Walloon and Picard is spoken (Wallo-Picard).

Some Flemish and Brabantic dialects of Dutch are spoken in the municipalities bordering the Flemish region.

== History ==
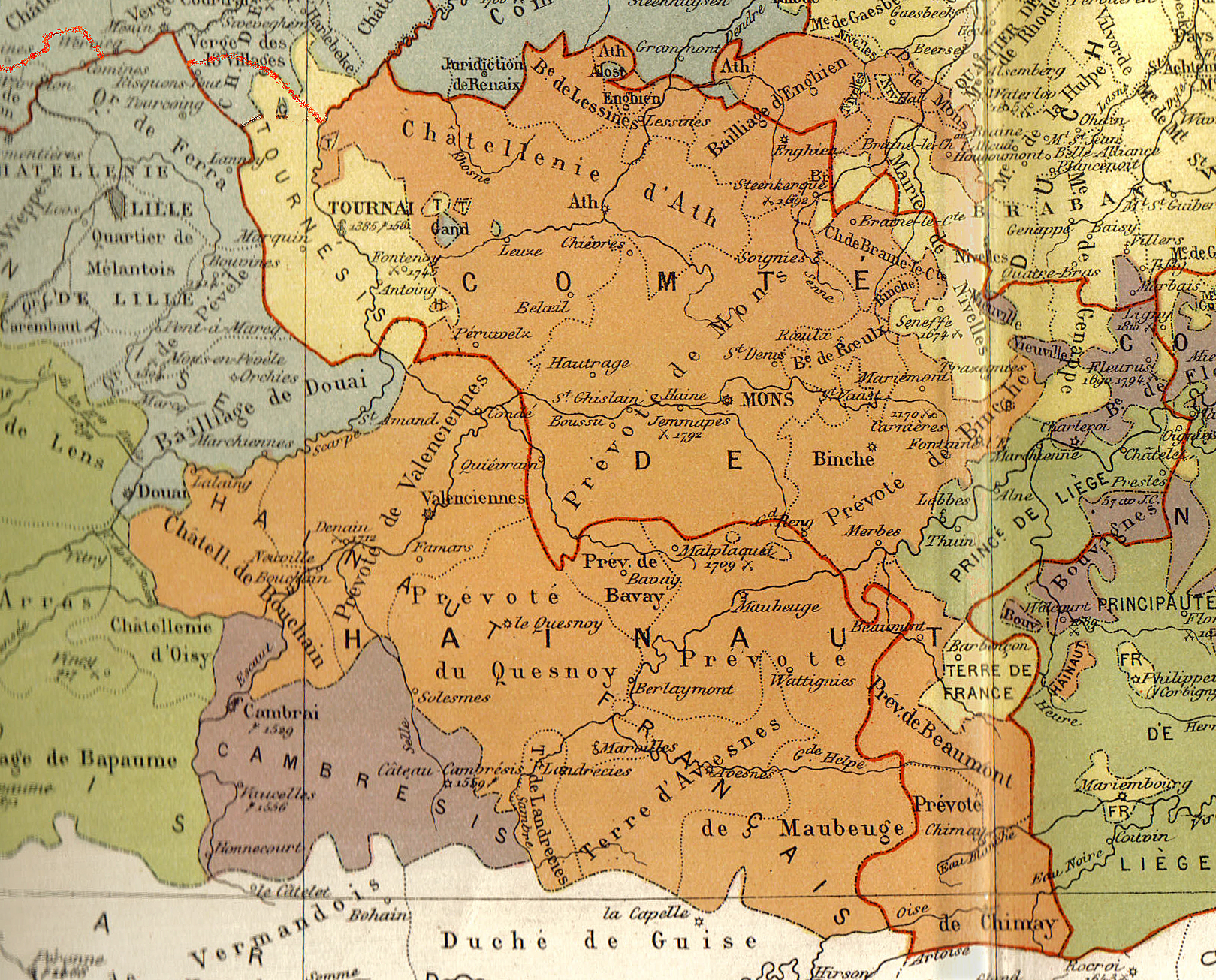
Historical map of the County of Hainaut, with in red the current French-Belgian border.

The province derives from the French Revolutionary Jemmape department, formed in 1795 from part of the medieval County of Hainaut, the small territory of Tournai and the Tournaisis, a part of the county of Namur (Charleroi), and also a small part of the Prince-Bishopric of Liège (Thuin). (A large part of the historical county of Hainaut is now within France and sometimes referred to as French Hainaut.)

== Subdivisions ==
Hainaut province is divided into 7 administrative districts (arrondissements), subdivided into a total of 69 municipalities. It has an area of 3,831 square kilometres (1,479 sq mi).

=== Arrondissements ===
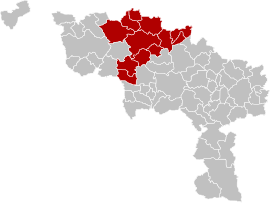
Ath

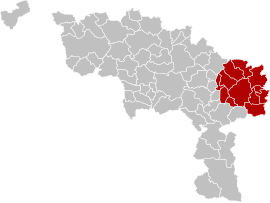
Charleroi

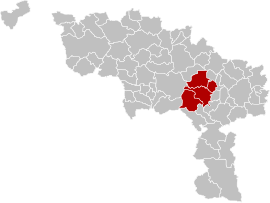
La Louvière

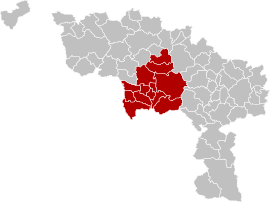
Mons

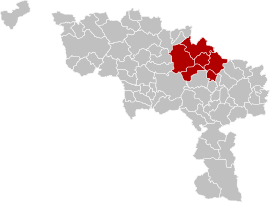
Soignies

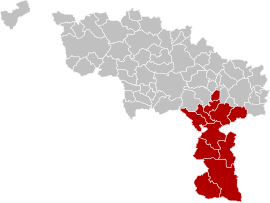
Thuin

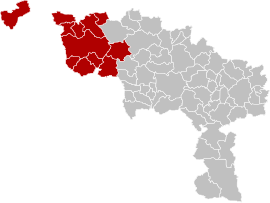
Tournai-Mouscron

=== Municipalities ===

Map no.	Municipality	Arrondissement
1	Aiseau-Presles	Charleroi
2	Anderlues	Thuin
3	Antoing	Tournai-Mouscron
4	Ath	Ath
5	Beaumont	Thuin
6	Belœil	Ath
7	Bernissart	Ath
8	Binche	La Louvière
9	Boussu	Mons
10	Braine-le-Comte	Soignies
11	Brugelette	Ath
12	Brunehaut	Tournai-Mouscron
13	Celles	Tournai-Mouscron
14	Chapelle-lez-Herlaimont	Charleroi
15	Charleroi	Charleroi
16	Châtelet	Charleroi
17	Chièvres	Ath
18	Chimay	Thuin
19	Colfontaine	Mons
20	Comines-Warneton	Tournai-Mouscron
21	Courcelles	Charleroi
22	Dour	Mons
23	Écaussinnes	Soignies
24	Ellezelles	Ath
25	Enghien	Ath
26	Erquelinnes	Thuin
27	Estaimpuis	Tournai-Mouscron
28	Estinnes	La Louvière
29	Farciennes	Charleroi
30	Fleurus	Charleroi
31	Flobecq	Ath
32	Fontaine-l'Évêque	Charleroi
33	Frameries	Mons
34	Frasnes-lez-Anvaing	Ath
35	Froidchapelle	Thuin
36	Gerpinnes	Charleroi
37	Ham-sur-Heure-Nalinnes	Thuin
38	Hensies	Mons
39	Honnelles	Mons
40	Jurbise	Mons
41	La Louvière	La Louvière
42	Le Rœulx	Soignies
43	Lens	Mons
44	Les Bons Villers	Charleroi
45	Lessines	Ath
46	Leuze-en-Hainaut	Tournai-Mouscron
47	Lobbes	Thuin
48	Manage	Soignies
49	Merbes-le-Château	Thuin
50	Momignies	Thuin
51	Mons	Mons
52	Mont-de-l'Enclus	Tournai-Mouscron
53	Montigny-le-Tilleul	Charleroi
54	Morlanwelz	La Louvière
55	Mouscron	Tournai-Mouscron
56	Pecq	Tournai-Mouscron
57	Péruwelz	Tournai-Mouscron
58	Pont-à-Celles	Charleroi
59	Quaregnon	Mons
60	Quévy	Mons
61	Quiévrain	Mons
62	Rumes	Tournai-Mouscron
63	Saint-Ghislain	Mons
64	Seneffe	Soignies
65	Silly	Ath
66	Sivry-Rance	Thuin
67	Soignies	Soignies
68	Thuin	Thuin
69	Tournai	Tournai-Mouscron

== Governors ==
- Jean-Baptiste Thorn (1836–1841)
- Charles Liedts (1841–1845)
- Édouard Mercier (1845–1847)
- Augustin Dumon-Dumortier (1847–1848)
- Adolphe de Vrière (1848–1849)
- Louis Troye (1849–1870)
- Joseph de Riquet de Caraman-Chimay (1870–1878)
- Auguste Wanderpepen (1878)
- Oswald de Kerchove de Denterghem (1878–1884)
- Auguste Vergote (1884–1885)
- Joseph d'Ursel (1885–1889)
- Charles d'Ursel (1889–1893)
- Raoul du Sart de Bouland (1893–1908)
- Maurice Damoiseaux (1908–1937)
- Henri Van Mol (1937–1940)
- Émile Cornez (1944–1967)
- Emilien Vaes (1967–1983)
- Michel Tromont (1983–2004)
- Claude Durieux (2004–2013)
- Tommy Leclercq (2013–present)

== Economy ==
The gross domestic product (GDP) of the province was €34.2 billion in 2018, accounting for 7.4% of Belgium's economic output. GDP per capita adjusted for purchasing power was €22,500 or 75% of the EU27 average in the same year. Hainaut is the province with the second lowest GDP per capita.

== Miscellaneous ==
The patron saint of the province Hainaut is Saint Waltrude.
