= Arrondissement of Hasselt =

Arrondissement of Hasselt Arrondissement Hasselt
- Arrondissement
- Location of the arrondissement in Limburg
- Coordinates: 50.95°N 5.25°E
- Country: Belgium
- Region: Flanders
- Province: Limburg
- Municipalities: 16

Area
  - Total: 881.17 km^{2} (340.22 sq mi)

Population (1 January 2017)
  - Total: 425,270
  - Density: 482.62/km^{2} (1,250.0/sq mi)
- Time zone: UTC+1 (CET)
  - Summer (DST): UTC+2 (CEST)

The Arrondissement of Hasselt (Dutch: Arrondissement Hasselt; French: Arrondissement de Hasselt) is one of the three administrative arrondissements in the Province of Limburg, Belgium.

It is both an administrative and a judicial arrondissement. However, the Judicial Arrondissement of Hasselt also comprises the municipalities of Lommel, Hamont-Achel, Neerpelt, Overpelt, Hechtel-Eksel, Peer and Houthalen-Helchteren in the Arrondissement of Maaseik.

== Municipalities ==
The Administrative Arrondissement of Hasselt consists of the following municipalities:

- As
- Beringen
- Diepenbeek
- Genk
- Gingelom
- Halen
- Hasselt
- Herk-de-Stad
- Heusden-Zolder
- Leopoldsburg
- Lummen
- Nieuwerkerken
- Sint-Truiden
- Tessenderlo-Ham
- Zonhoven
- Zutendaal

Per 1 January 2019, the municipality of Opglabbeek was removed from this arrondissement, as it was merged with Meeuwen-Gruitrode into the new municipality of Oudsbergen in the arrondissement of Maaseik.
