= Arrondissement of Tongeren =

Arrondissement of Tongeren Arrondissement Tongeren
- Arrondissement
- Location of the arrondissement in Limburg
- Coordinates: 50.85°N 5.5°E
- Country: Belgium
- Region: Flanders
- Province: Limburg
- Municipalities: 11

Area
  - Total: 631.56 km^{2} (243.85 sq mi)

Population (1 January 2017)
  - Total: 202,301
  - Density: 320.32/km^{2} (829.62/sq mi)
- Time zone: UTC+1 (CET)
  - Summer (DST): UTC+2 (CEST)

The Arrondissement of Tongeren (Dutch: Arrondissement Tongeren; French: Arrondissement de Tongres) is one of the three administrative arrondissements in the Province of Limburg, Belgium. It is both an administrative and a judicial arrondissement. However, the Judicial Arrondissement of Tongeren comprises the municipalities of Tongeren, Bocholt, Bree, Kinrooi, Meeuwen-Gruitrode, Dilsen-Stokkem and Maaseik in the Arrondissement of Maaseik and the municipalities of As, Genk, Opglabbeek and Zutendaal in the Arrondissement of Hasselt.

The arrondissement was created in 1839 to form the Belgian part of the former arrondissement of Maastricht, which ceased to exist due to the splitting of Limburg. The canton of Borgloon was also moved from the arrondissement of Hasselt to the new arrondissement of Tongeren.

== Municipalities ==
The Administrative Arrondissement of Tongeren consists of the following municipalities:

- Alken
- Bilzen-Hoeselt
- Heers
- Herstappe
- Kortessem
- Lanaken
- Maasmechelen
- Riemst
- Tongeren-Borgloon
- Voeren
- Wellen
