= Belarus women's national goalball team =

Belarusian national team, for the Paralympic sport of goalball

Belarus women's national goalball team is the women's national team of Belarus. Goalball is a team sport designed for athletes with a vision impairment. The team takes part in international competitions.

== Regional championships ==
The team can compete in the IBSA Europe goalball region.

The team competed in the 2015 IBSA European Regional Championships, from 15 to 23 October 2005, in Neerpelt and Overpelt, Belgium. Organised by the Vlaamse Liga Gehandicaptensport vzw (Flemish Sport Federation for Persons with a Disability), it hosted the ten women teams. The team finished tenth.

== See also ==
- Disabled sports
- Belarus at the Paralympics
