= Rugbyclub Maasland =

Belgian rugby union club, based in Opglabbeek

- Location: Maaseik, Belgium
- Chairman: Rob Creemers
- Coach: Tjeerd Douna
Team kit

Rugbyclub Oudsbergen is a Belgian rugby club in Opglabbeek. The club will be called Oudsbergen from 1 January 2019.
