= Nieuwerkerken =

- Municipality
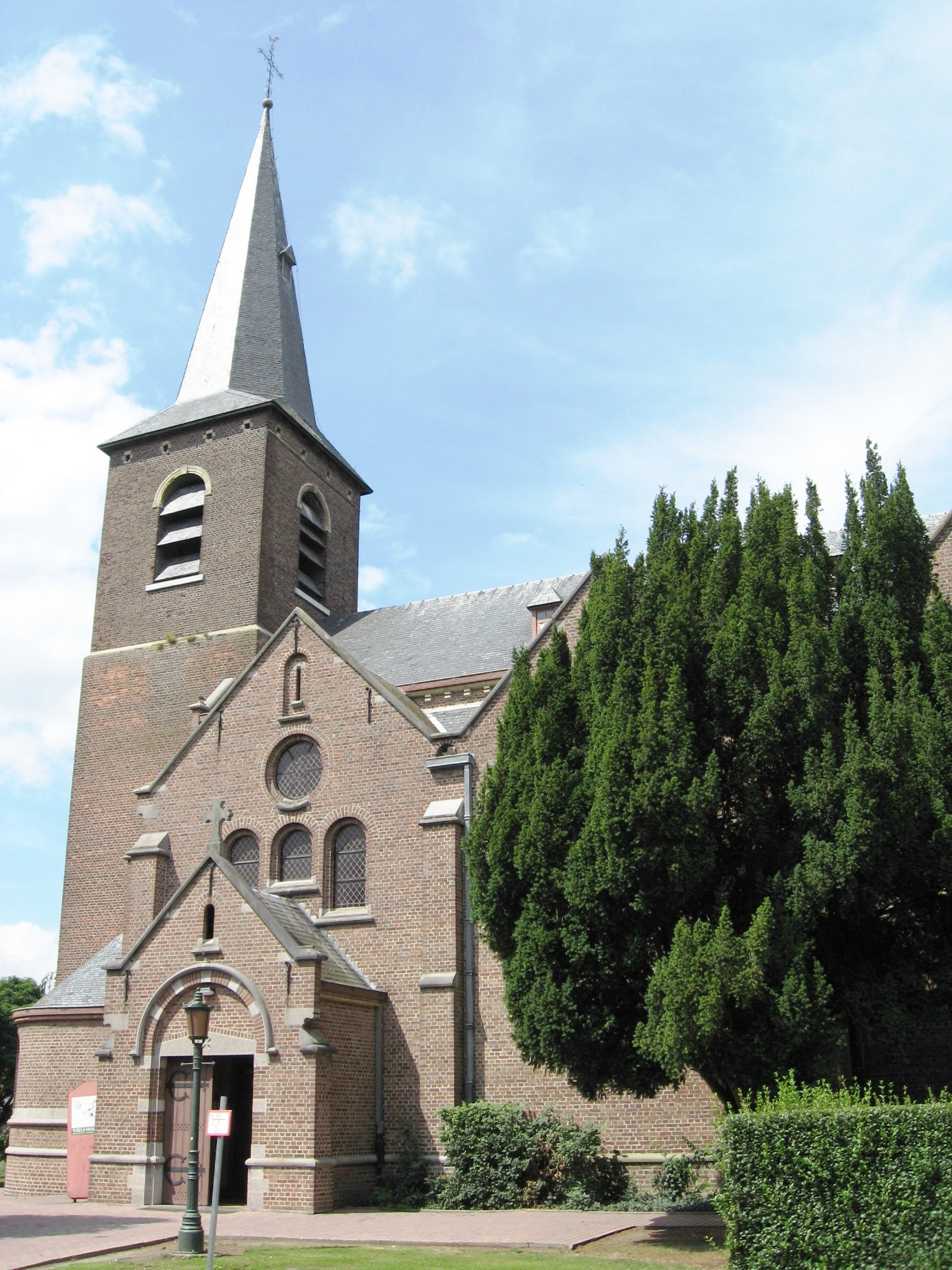

- Flag Coat of arms

- Location of Nieuwerkerken in Limburg
- Interactive map of Nieuwerkerken
- Location in Belgium
- Coordinates: 50°52′N 05°12′E
- Country: Belgium
- Community: Flemish Community
- Region: Flemish Region
- Province: Limburg
- Arrondissement: Hasselt

Government
  - Mayor: Dries Deferm (CD&V)
  - Governing party: CD&V

Area
  - Total: 22.51 km^{2} (8.69 sq mi)

Population (2018-01-01)
  - Total: 6,960
  - Density: 309/km^{2} (801/sq mi)
- Postal codes: 3850
- NIS code: 71045
- Area codes: 011
- Website: www.nieuwerkerken.be

Nieuwerkerken (Dutch: [ˈniu.ərˌkɛrkə(n)]; Limburgish: Noërekirke) is a municipality located in the Belgian province of Limburg near Hasselt. On January 1, 2006, Nieuwerkerken had a total population of 6,606. The total area is 22.46 km^{2} which gives a population density of 294 inhabitants per km^{2}. It consists of 4 villages: Binderveld, Wijer, Kozen and Nieuwerkerken. The current mayor is Dries Deferm (CD&V - Christian Democrats).

The municipality consists of the following sub-municipalities: Binderveld, Kozen, Nieuwerkerken proper, and Wijer.

The village of Wijer was the location for the first series of the television show De Werf (VTM).

== Attractions ==
Main monuments:

- St Peter's Church (1910)
- Castle (farm) of Nieuwerkerken (1648)
- Castle Schelfstad Heath (18th century)
- Heath Schelfstad Mining (18th century)
