= List of protected heritage sites in As, Belgium =

This table shows an overview of the protected heritage sites in the Flemish town As, Belgium. This list is part of Belgium's national heritage.

| Object | Status^{?} | Year/architect | Town/section | Address | Coordinates | Number^{?} | Image |
|---|---|---|---|---|---|---|---|
| Parish Church St. Aldegondis ^{(nl)} ^{(fr)} | Yes | | As | Kerkpad | 51.00863°N 5.58565°E | 21376 Info | |
| elongated farm with farm mansion ^{(nl)} ^{(fr)} | | | As | Dorpsstraat 26 | 51.00794°N 5.58620°E | 21379 Info | |
| Farmer manor house ^{(nl)} ^{(fr)} | | | As | Dorpsstraat 27 | 51.00737°N 5.58619°E | 21380 Info | |
| House ^{(nl)} ^{(fr)} | | | As | Dorpsstraat 28 | 51.00798°N 5.58600°E | 21381 Info | |
| chapel ^{(nl)} ^{(fr)} | | | As | Duinstraat | 51.01193°N 5.57116°E | 21383 Info | |
| elongated farm ^{(nl)} ^{(fr)} | | | As | Duinstraat 29 | 51.01161°N 5.57121°E | 21385 Info | |
| St. Theresa Parish church dating from 1950 ^{(nl)} ^{(fr)} | | | As | Kerkplein | 51.00601°N 5.58401°E | 21387 Info | |
| elongated farm ^{(nl)} ^{(fr)} | | | As | Klaverbergstraat 9 | 51.00961°N 5.55764°E | 21388 Info | |
| Farmhouse with separate components ^{(nl)} ^{(fr)} | | | As | Neereinde 3 | 51.00284°N 5.58157°E | 21389 Info | |
| elongated farm ^{(nl)} ^{(fr)} | | | As | Neereinde 5 | 51.00255°N 5.58233°E | 21390 Info | |
| elongated farm ^{(nl)} ^{(fr)} | | | As | Neereinde 7 | 51.00255°N 5.58233°E | 21390 Info | |
| Former elongated farm ^{(nl)} ^{(fr)} | | | As | Neereinde 6 | 51.00221°N 5.58175°E | 21391 Info | |
| Former elongated farm ^{(nl)} ^{(fr)} | | | As | Neereinde 8 | 51.00221°N 5.58175°E | 21391 Info | |
| elongated farm of 1867 ^{(nl)} ^{(fr)} | | | As | Nieuwebeekstraat 9 | 51.00795°N 5.58202°E | 21392 Info | |
| New mill, grain watermill ^{(nl)} ^{(fr)} | Yes | | As | André Dumontlaan 17 | 51.01021°N 5.58138°E | 21393 Info | |
| Watermill "Old Mill" ^{(nl)} ^{(fr)} | Yes | | As | Oude Molenweg 69 | 51.01721°N 5.58842°E | 21395 Info | |
| St. Joseph Chapel of 1865 ^{(nl)} ^{(fr)} | | | As | Grotstraat | 51.02211°N 5.60091°E | 21396 Info | |
| Caster Farm ^{(nl)} ^{(fr)} | | | As | Grotstraat 70 | 51.02236°N 5.60163°E | 21397 Info | |
| U-shaped farm ^{(nl)} ^{(fr)} | | | As | Grotstraat 29 | 51.01798°N 5.59825°E | 21398 Info | |
| Farmer manor house ^{(nl)} ^{(fr)} | | | As | Hoogstraat 121 | 51.01594°N 5.60141°E | 21401 Info | |
| elongated farm ^{(nl)} ^{(fr)} | | | As | Hoogstraat 276 | 51.02788°N 5.61480°E | 21403 Info | |
| elongated farm ^{(nl)} ^{(fr)} | | | As | Schutterijstraat 20 | 51.02931°N 5.60992°E | 21404 Info | |
| elongated farm ^{(nl)} ^{(fr)} | | | As | Caelenbergstraat 38 | 51.03108°N 5.60743°E | 21406 Info | |
| elongated farm ^{(nl)} ^{(fr)} | | | As | Karel Theunissenlaan 15 | 51.01912°N 5.58334°E | 83612 Info | |
| As train station ^{(nl)} ^{(fr)} | Yes | | As | Stationsstraat | 51.00539°N 5.60264°E | 200283 Info | |
| Military flight school and later children's colony ^{(nl)} ^{(fr)} | | | As | Bilzerweg 88 | | 206923 Info | |
| St. Hubert Chapel ^{(nl)} ^{(fr)} | | | As | Oeleinderheide | | 212746 Info | |

== See also ==
- List of onroerend erfgoed in Limburg (Belgium)
- As, Belgium
