= List of protected heritage sites in Ham, Belgium =

This table shows an overview of the protected heritage sites in the Flemish town Ham, Belgium. This list is part of Belgium's national heritage.

Object	Status^{?}	Year/architect	Town/section	Address	Coordinates	Number^{?}	Image
Parish Church Saint-Lambert ^{(nl)} ^{(fr)}	OL000652		Ham	Dorpsstraat 16	51.10177°N 5.14699°E	21815 Info	
rectory ^{(nl)} ^{(fr)}			Ham	Dorpsstraat 21	51.10122°N 5.14825°E	21816 Info	
Our Lady Chapel, 1919 ^{(nl)} ^{(fr)}			Ham	Processiestraat	51.10260°N 5.13794°E	21817 Info	
St. Anne Chapel, 1860 ^{(nl)} ^{(fr)}			Ham	Kanaalstraat	51.10017°N 5.14128°E	21819 Info	
elongated farm ^{(nl)} ^{(fr)}			Ham	Kanaalstraat 60	51.09984°N 5.13730°E	21821 Info	
Parish of Our Lady of the Assumption 1840 ^{(nl)} ^{(fr)}	OL002087		Ham	Kerkstraat	51.08391°N 5.10509°E	21823 Info	
Our Lady Chapel, 1864 ^{(nl)} ^{(fr)}			Ham	Broekstraat	51.10905°N 5.14045°E	21824 Info	
Parish of Our Lady of Birth ^{(nl)} ^{(fr)}	OL000399		Ham	Heldenplein	51.10385°N 5.17823°E	21825 Info	
Mansion house type double ^{(nl)} ^{(fr)}			Ham	Heldenplein 2	51.10454°N 5.18000°E	21826 Info	
farm ^{(nl)} ^{(fr)}	OL002168		Ham	Gerhees 30	51.11581°N 5.19366°E	21830 Info	
Presbytery double house ^{(nl)} ^{(fr)}	OL000391		Ham	Pastoriestraat 5	51.09784°N 5.17396°E	21832 Info	
Farm with loose components ^{(nl)} ^{(fr)}			Ham	Langven 38	51.11601°N 5.17833°E	83598 Info	
Farm with loose components ^{(nl)} ^{(fr)}			Ham	Langven	51.11706°N 5.17928°E	83599 Info	
small farm ^{(nl)} ^{(fr)}			Ham	Pastoriestraat 6	51.09757°N 5.17326°E	83768 Info	
Entrenchment of Gerhees ^{(nl)} ^{(fr)}	OL002168		Ham	Boskant	51.10979°N 5.20546°E	200395 Info	

== See also ==
- List of onroerend erfgoed in Limburg (Belgium)
- Ham, Belgium
