= Arrondissement of Maaseik =

Arrondissement in Flanders, Belgium

Arrondissement of Maaseik Arrondissement Maaseik
- Arrondissement
- Location of the arrondissement in Limburg
- Coordinates: 51.15°N 5.5°E
- Country: Belgium
- Region: Flanders
- Province: Limburg
- Municipalities: 11

Area
  - Total: 909.41 km^{2} (351.13 sq mi)

Population (1 January 2017)
  - Total: 239,842
  - Density: 263.73/km^{2} (683.07/sq mi)
- Time zone: UTC+1 (CET)
  - Summer (DST): UTC+2 (CEST)

The Arrondissement of Maaseik (Dutch: Arrondissement Maaseik; French: Arrondissement de Maaseik) is one of the three administrative arrondissements in the Province of Limburg, Belgium. It is not a judicial arrondissement. The municipalities of Bocholt, Bree, Kinrooi, Meeuwen-Gruitrode, Dilsen-Stokkem and Maaseik, are part of the Judicial Arrondissement of Tongeren, while the rest of its municipalities are part of the Judicial Arrondissement of Hasselt.

== History ==
The arrondissement was created in 1839 to form the Belgian part of the former arrondissement of Roermond, which ceased to exist due to the splitting of Limburg. The canton of Peer was also moved from the arrondissement of Hasselt to the new arrondissement of Maaseik.

Per 1 January 2019, the municipalities of Overpelt and Neerpelt were merged into the new municipality of Pelt, and Meeuwen-Gruitrode and Opglabbeek (a municipality in the arrondissement of Hasselt) were merged into Oudsbergen.

== Municipalities ==
The Administrative Arrondissement of Maaseik consists of the following municipalities:

- Bocholt
- Bree
- Dilsen-Stokkem
- Hamont-Achel
- Hechtel-Eksel
- Houthalen-Helchteren
- Lommel
- Maaseik
- Oudsbergen
- Pelt
- Peer
