= Ham, Belgium =

Ham
- Municipality
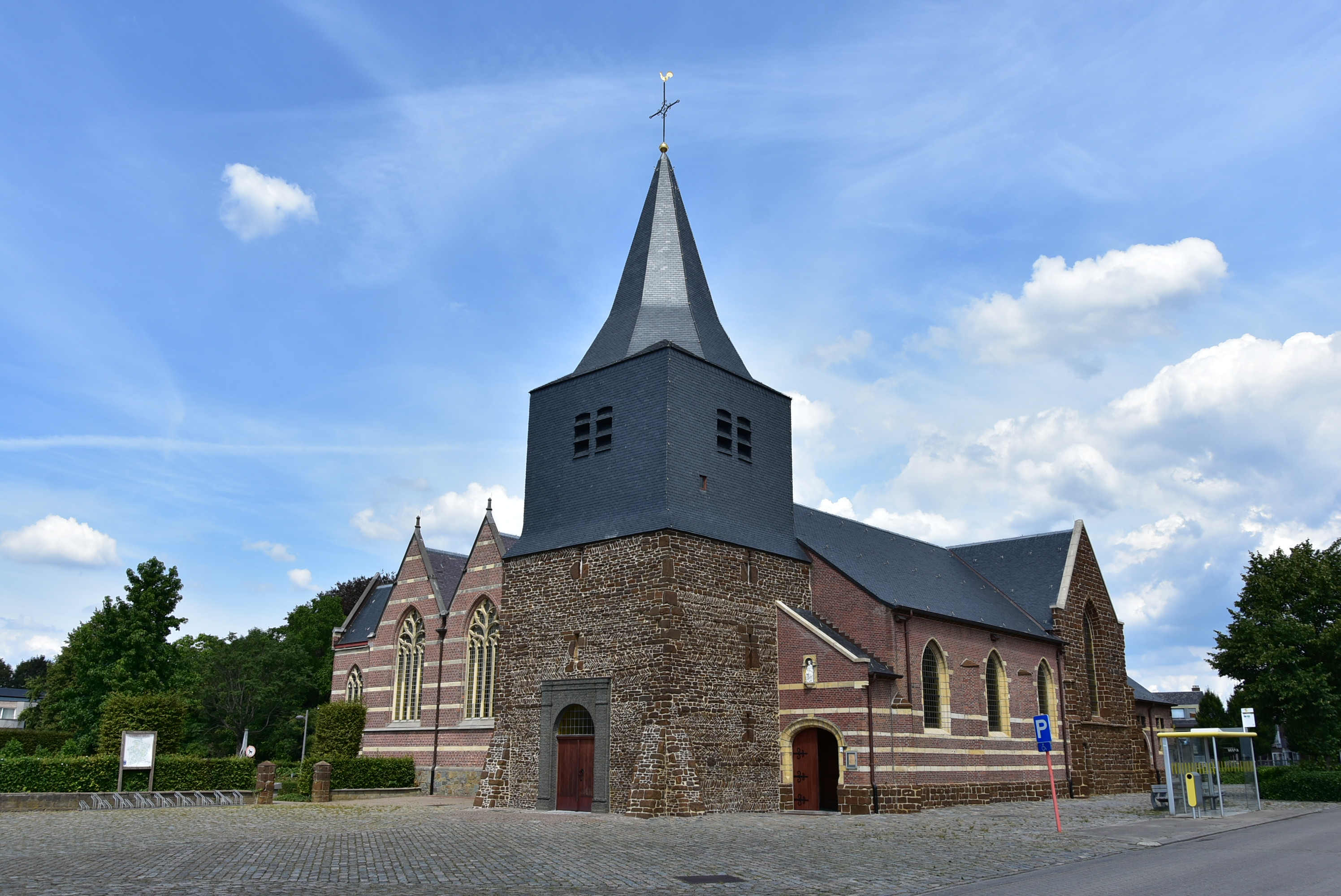

- Flag Coat of arms

- Location of Ham in Limburg
- Interactive map of Ham
- Location in Belgium
- Coordinates: 51°06′N 05°08′E
- Country: Belgium
- Community: Flemish Community
- Region: Flemish Region
- Province: Limburg
- Arrondissement: Hasselt

Government
  - Mayor: Marc Heselmans (CD&V)
  - Governing parties: CD&V, Open VLD

Population (2018-01-01)
  - Total: 10,824
- Postal codes: 3945
- NIS code: 71069
- Area codes: 013 - 011
- Website: www.ham.be

Ham (Dutch pronunciation: [ˈɦɑm]) is a former municipality located in the Belgian province of Limburg. On January 1, 2006, Ham had a total population of 9,705. The total area is 32.69 km^{2} (13 sq mi) which gives a population density of 297 inhabitants per km^{2} (746/sq mi).

== Demographics ==
Year	Population	Male population	Female population	Density
2002	9,387	4,703	4,684	284.71/km^{2} (722/sq mi)

In August, 2008 the population of Ham exceeded 10,000 inhabitants.

== Fusion ==
The municipality of Ham was created January 1977 by the fusion of the municipalities of Oostham and Kwaadmechelen. In 2025, Ham And Tessenderlo fused to become Tessenderlo-Ham
