= Pelt (municipality) =

- Municipality
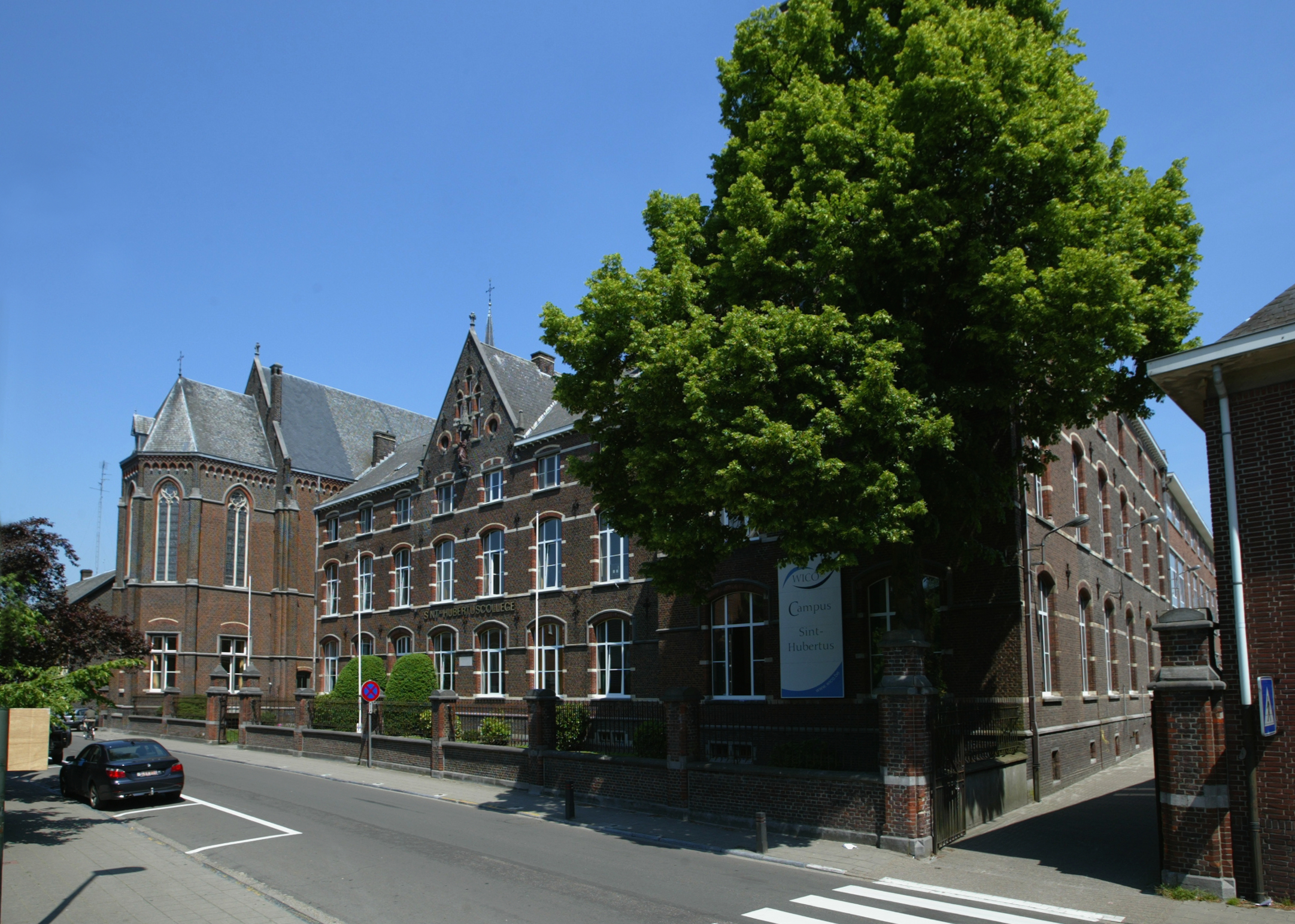
- Saint Hubert College in Neerpelt

- Flag Coat of arms

- Location of Pelt in Limburg
- Interactive map of Pelt
- Location in Belgium
- Coordinates: 51°13′N 05°25′E
- Country: Belgium
- Community: Flemish Community
- Region: Flemish Region
- Province: Limburg
- Arrondissement: Maaseik

Government
  - Mayor: Dennis Fransen (CD&V)
  - Governing parties: CD&V, Samen Pelt

Area
  - Total: 83.78 km^{2} (32.35 sq mi)

Population (2022-01-01)
  - Total: 33,601
  - Density: 401.1/km^{2} (1,039/sq mi)
- Postal codes: 3900, 3910
- NIS code: 72043
- Area codes: 011
- Website: www.gemeentepelt.be

Pelt (Dutch pronunciation: [ˈpɛlt]) is a municipality in the Belgian province of Limburg. It arose on 1 January 2019 from the merging of the municipalities of Neerpelt and Overpelt.

After Neerpelt and Overpelt had previously agreed in principle to a merger, the new name of the municipality was announced on 4 November 2017 after a local referendum on the question. Out of the three possibilities Dommelpelt, Pelt or Pelten more than 74 percent of the votes eventually went to Pelt. The name goes back to the Romans, who called the sandy area Palethe, meaning boggy land.

The municipal councils definitively approved the merger on 18 December 2017. Neerpelt and Overpelt thus ceased to exist on 31 December 2018. A day later, on 1 January 2019, Pelt officially became a new municipality in Limburg.

The merged municipality has an area of 83.63 km^{2} and counts more than 32,000 inhabitants.
