= Limburg mijn Vaderland =

Anthem of Limburg

Limburg mijn Vaderland
Tamboer- en Fanfarekorps Regiment Limburgse Jagers

Limburg mijn Vaderland ("Limburg my Fatherland") or Limburg, mijn vaderland ("Limburg, my fatherland") is the official anthem of the two provinces of Limburg, Dutch Limburg and Belgian Limburg.

== History ==
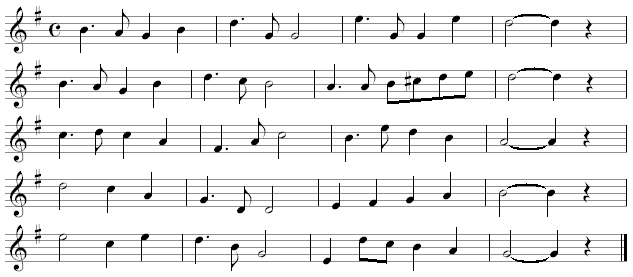
Music of the Limburg anthem

The anthem was written by the schoolteacher Gerard Krekelberg in 1909. The music was composed by Henri Tijssen. Tijssen also wrote the anthem of the city of Roermond, Oud en trouw Roermond.

The fact that Krekelberg's lyrics are in Dutch can be seen as surprising. It is all the more surprising that he put quite a lot of emphasis on Limburg being united, which was not the case at the time - and arguably still is not. The Limburgish language was - and still is - very much a unifying factor in a culturally diverse area. Around the time that Krekelberg wrote his poem, Dutch was of little importance in daily life in Limburg. Everything was done in Limburgish. In the 19th century this was even more the case. Newspapers were either in German or French. In various parts of Limburg, German was the language used in churches and schools. In Maastricht, a largely Francized city due to its historic ties with Liège, education, theatre and 'polite' conversation and correspondence were in French.

== Lyrics ==
The lyrics describe the natural beauty of Limburg and the noble nature of its people. Usually only the first stanza is sung, sometimes also the second one. The third stanza talks about the "beautiful language of the ancestors", "despising foreign pomp" and "preferring our own way of life". The last stanza, about the strong ties with the Netherlands and the House of Orange, is for obvious reasons never sung in Belgium.

Waar in 't bronsgroen eikenhout, 't nachtegaaltje zingt,
Over 't malse korenveld, 't lied des leeuweriks klinkt,
Waar de hoorn des herders schalt, langs der beekjes boord:
Daar is mijn vaderland, Limburgs dierbaar oord!
Daar is mijn vaderland, Limburgs dierbaar oord!

Waar de brede stroom der Maas, statig zeewaarts vloeit,
Weel'drig sappig veldgewas, kostelijk groeit en bloeit,
Bloemengaard en beemd en bos, overheerlijk gloort:
Daar is mijn vaderland, Limburgs dierbaar oord!
Daar is mijn vaderland, Limburgs dierbaar oord!

Waar der vaad'ren schone taal klinkt met heldere kracht,
Waar men kloek en fier van aard, vreemde praal veracht,
Eigen zeden, eigen schoon 't hart des volks bekoort:
Daar is mijn vaderland, Limburgs dierbaar oord!
Daar is mijn vaderland, Limburgs dierbaar oord!

Waar aan 't oud Oranjehuis, 't volk blijft hou en trouw,
Met ons roemrijk Nederland, één in vreugd en rouw,
Trouw aan plicht en trouw aan God, heerst van zuid tot noord:
Daar is mijn vaderland, Limburgs dierbaar oord!
Daar is mijn vaderland, Limburgs dierbaar oord!

Translation:

Where the little nightingale sings in the bronze green oak [forest],
[Where] the lay of the lark sounds over the tender cornfield,
Where the shepherd's horn echoes, along the bank of the little stream:
There is my fatherland, Limburg's dear place!
There is my fatherland, Limburg's dear place!

Where the broad stream of the Meuse flows stately towards the sea,
[Where the] lush, juicy field crops, deliciously grow and flourish,
[Where the] flower garden and meadow and forest delightfully shine:
There is my fatherland, Limburg's dear place!
There is my fatherland, Limburg's dear place!

Where the fine language of the forefathers sounds with clear strength,
Where one by nature prudent and proud, despises foreign pageantry,
[Where our] own customs, [our] own beauty pleases the heart of the people:
There is my fatherland, Limburg's dear place!
There is my fatherland, Limburg's dear place!

Where the people remain faithful to the ancient House of Orange,
With our glorious Netherlands, united in joy and sorrow,
Faithful to duty and faithful to God, prevails from south to north:
There is my fatherland, Limburg's dear place!
There is my fatherland, Limburg's dear place!
