= Tessenderlo-Ham =

Municipality in Limburg, Belgium

Location

Tessenderlo-Ham is a municipality located in the Belgian province of Limburg.

Tessenderlo-Ham is the result of the merger of Tessenderlo and Ham on January 1, 2025.
