= Közen =

- Language: Turkish

Közen is a Turkish surname. Notable people with the surname include:

- Dexter Kozen, American theoretical computer scientist
- Ömer Közen, Turkish footballer
