= Neerpelt =

- Town
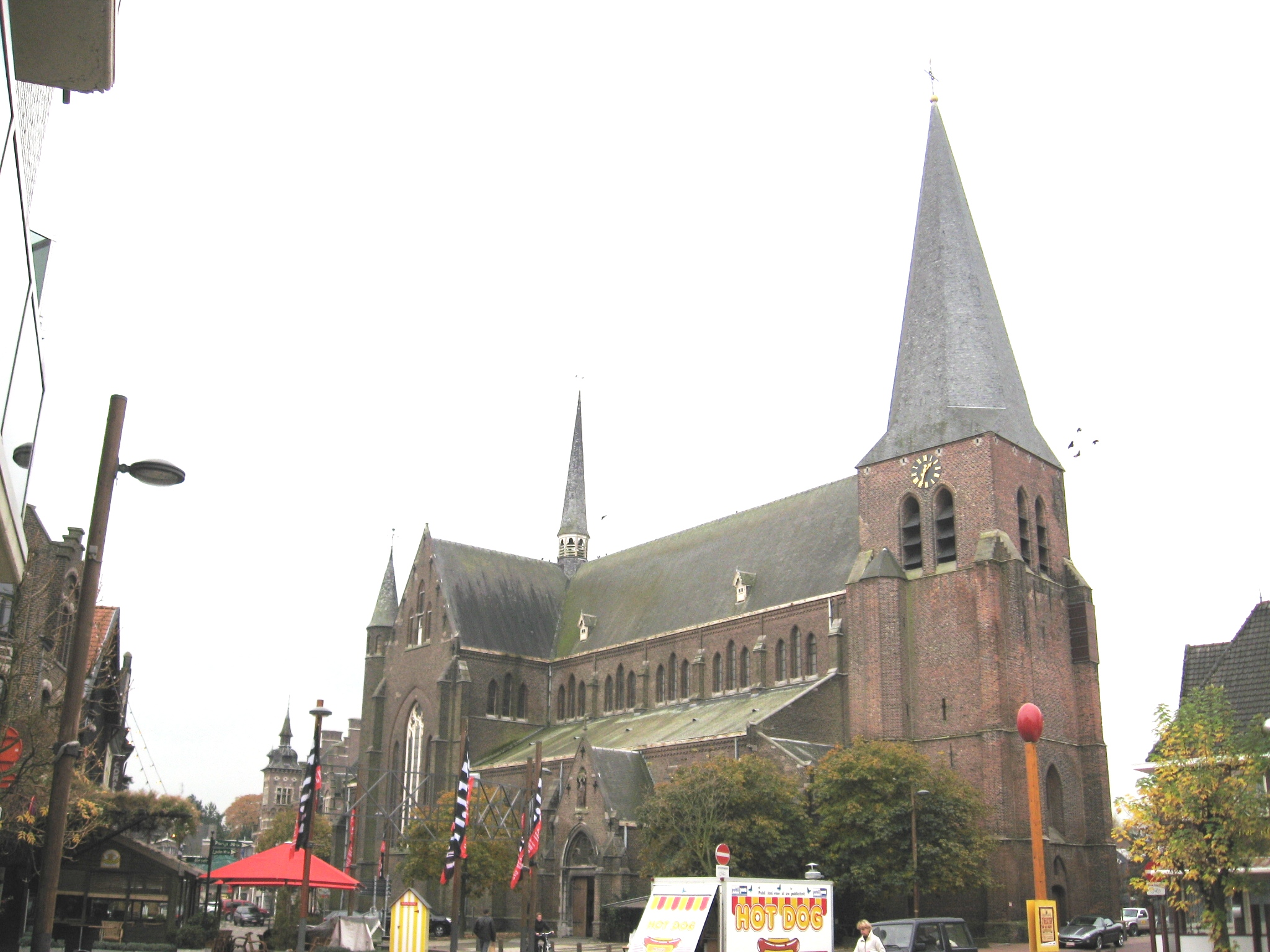
- Sint-Niklaas church in Neerpelt

- Flag Seal

- Location in Belgium
- Coordinates: 51°14′N 05°26′E
- Country: Belgium
- Region: Flemish Region
- Province: Limburg
- Arrondissement: Maaseik
- Municipality: Pelt

Area
  - Total: 29.39 km^{2} (11.35 sq mi)

Population (2021)
  - Total: 14,074
  - Density: 478.9/km^{2} (1,240/sq mi)
- Time zone: CET
- Postal code: 3910
- Dialing code: 011
- Website: www.neerpelt.be

Neerpelt (Dutch pronunciation: [ˈneːrpɛlt], lit. 'Lower Pelt') is a town in Pelt and a former municipality located in the Belgian province of Limburg. In 2018, the municipality had a total population of 17,174. The total area is 42.78 km^{2}.

Effective 1 January 2019, Neerpelt and Overpelt were merged into the new municipality of Pelt.

== Culture ==
Provinciaal Domein Dommelhof is the cultural centre of Neerpelt. This institute houses several smaller organisations:

- Musica: Impulse Center for music, and manager of het Klankenbos (the sound forest) on the Dommelhof site
- Zebracinema: arthouse cinema in Belgian Limburg
- Circus Center: Flemish anchor point for circus art
- Jazzcase: Northern Limburg jazz platform

The Klankenbos is the biggest sound art collection in public space in Europe. In the forest there are 15 sound installation pieces by artists such as Pierre Berthet, Paul Panhuysen, Geert Jan Hobbijn (Staalplaat Soundsystem), Hans van Koolwijk, and others.

== Famous inhabitants ==
Famous people who were born or lived in Neerpelt include:

- Stijn Coninx, director of Academy Award nominated film "Daens"
- Ken De Dycker, motocross racer
- Eric Geboers, motocross world champion
- Bart Goor, football (soccer) player, played 65 times for the Belgium national team
- Wim Mertens, composer, musician, and musicologist (b. 1953)
- Stijn Meuris, singer-songwriter with the bands Monza and Noordkaap
- Belle Perez, singer
- Raf Simons, fashion designer
- Jelle Vanendert, professional cyclist who currently rides for Lotto-Belisol
- Joost Zweegers, singer-songwriter with the band Novastar
- Hans Vanaken, football player

== See also ==
- Sint-Hubertuscollege
