= Overpelt =

- Town
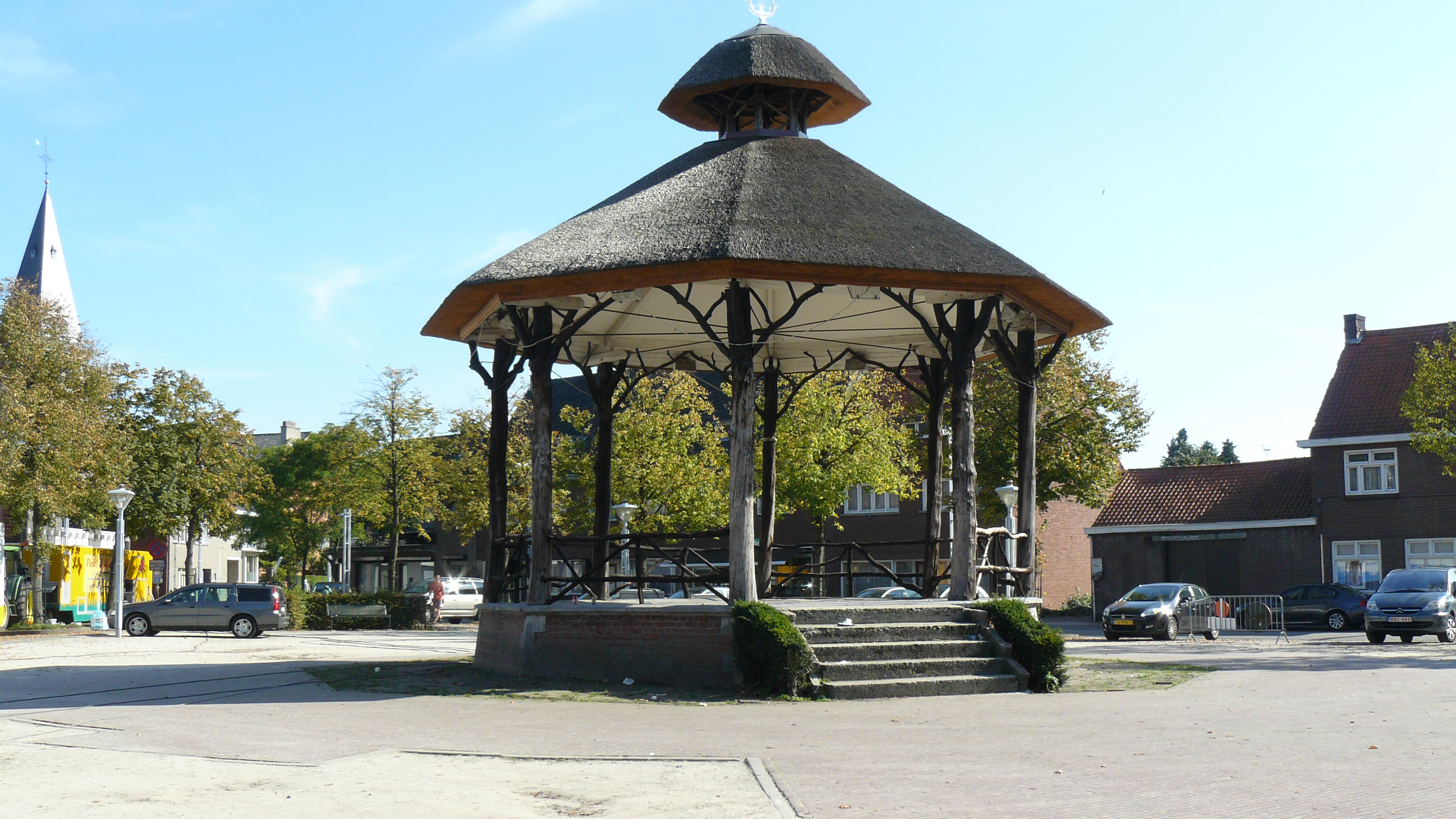
- Neerpelt - Sint-Niklaas church

- Flag Seal

- Location in Belgium
- Coordinates: 51°13′N 05°25′E
- Country: Belgium
- Region: Flemish Region
- Province: Limburg
- Arrondissement: Maaseik
- Municipality: Pelt

Area
  - Total: 9.95 km^{2} (3.84 sq mi)

Population (2021)
  - Total: 15,918
  - Density: 1,600/km^{2} (4,140/sq mi)
- Time zone: CET
- Postal code: 3900
- Dialing code: 011
- Website: www.overpelt.be

Overpelt (Dutch pronunciation: [ˈoːvərˌpɛlt], lit. 'Upper Pelt') is a town in the municipality of Pelt and a former municipality located in the Belgian province of Limburg. In 2018, the municipality of Overpelt had a total population of 15,478.

The municipality consisted of the following population centres: centre, Holheide, Overpelt-Fabriek, and Lindelhoeven.

Three hospitals are in Overpelt. In 2005, the St. Mary hospital opened as a merger of hospitals in Lommel and Neerpelt. In addition there is the MS-clinic and a center for disabled, Sainte-Ode.

Effective 1 January 2019, Neerpelt and Overpelt were merged into the new municipality of Pelt.

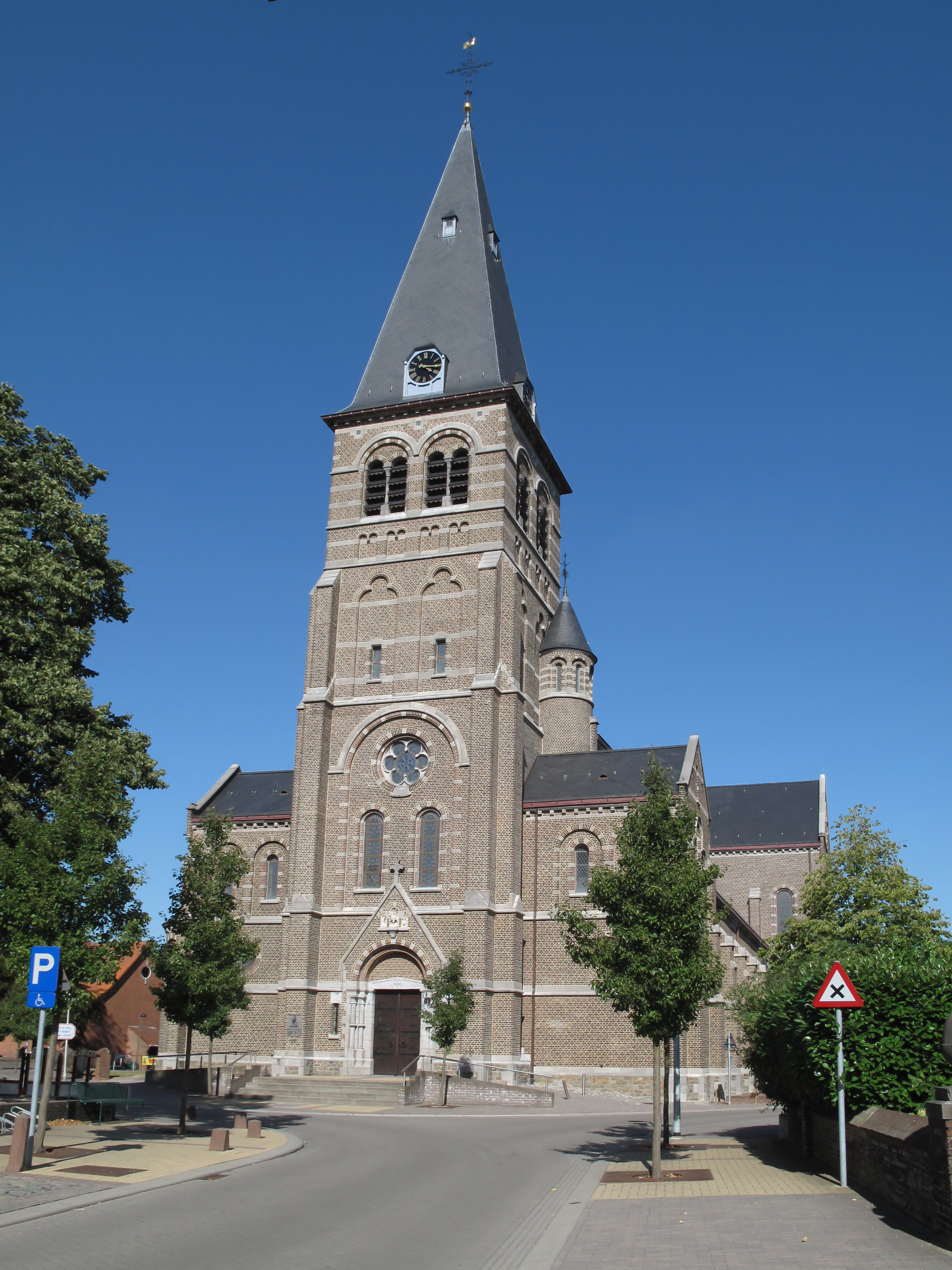
The Sint Martinuskerk (church of Saint Martin)
