= Opglabbeek =

Opglabbeek Glabbek
- Town
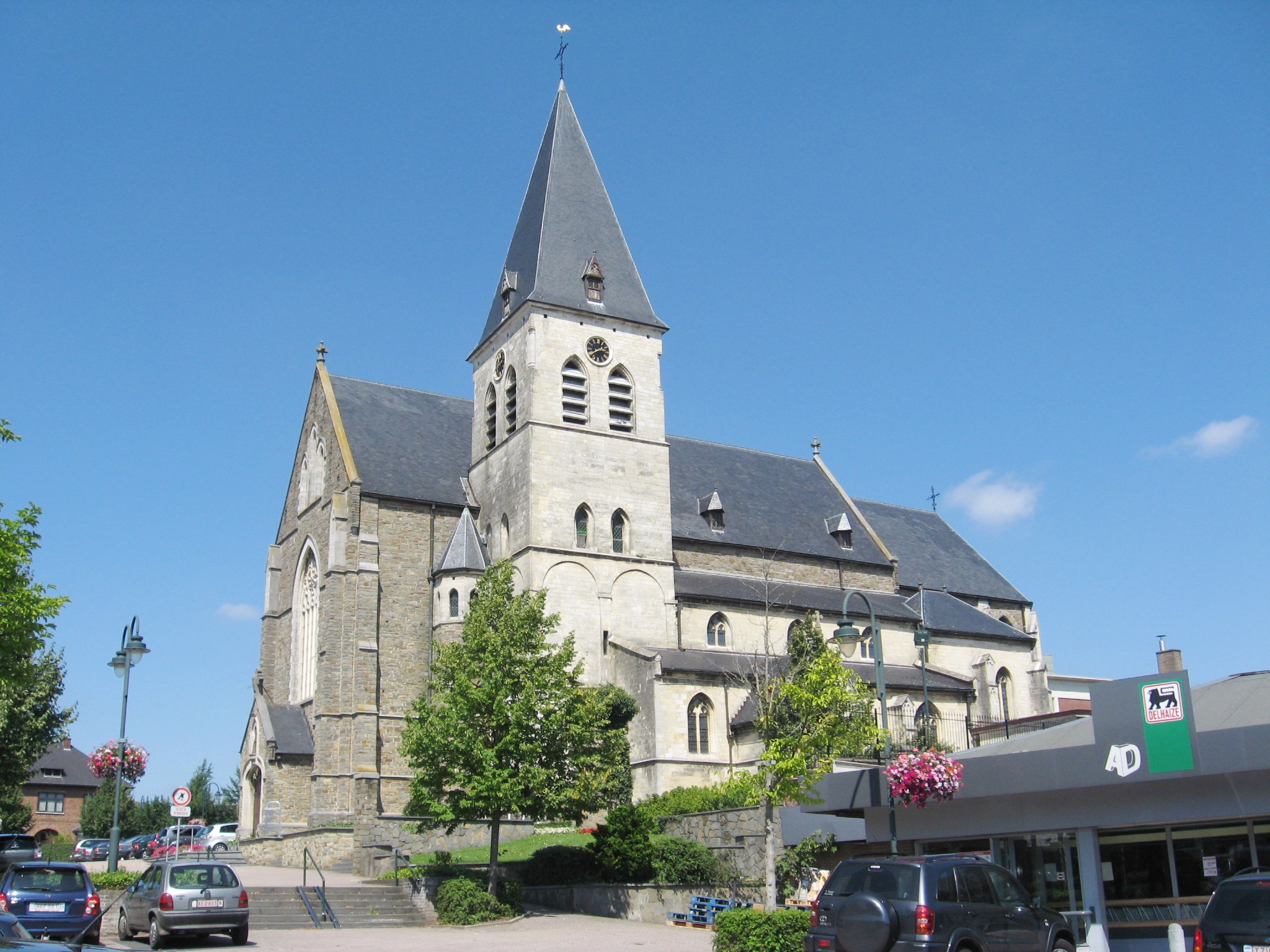
- The Onze-Lieve-Vrouw ter Kempen Church

- Flag Seal

- Location in Belgium
- Coordinates: 51°03′N 05°35′E
- Country: Belgium
- Region: Flemish Region
- Province: Limburg
- Arrondissement: Maaseik
- Municipality: Oudsbergen

Area
  - Total: 25.06 km^{2} (9.68 sq mi)

Population (2021)
  - Total: 10,403
  - Density: 415.1/km^{2} (1,075/sq mi)
- Time zone: CET
- Postal code: 3660
- Dialing code: 089
- Website: www.opglabbeek.be

Opglabbeek (Dutch pronunciation: [ˈɔpˌxlɑbeːk]; Limburgish: Glabbek) is a village, former municipality located in the Belgian province of Limburg. In 2018, Opglabbeek had a total population of 10,332. The total area is 24.98 km^{2}.

The municipality consisted of the following communities: Opglabbeek proper, Nieuwe Kempen, and Louwel.

Effective 1 January 2019, Opglabbeek and Meeuwen-Gruitrode were merged into the new municipality of Oudsbergen.
