= As, Belgium =

As
- Municipality
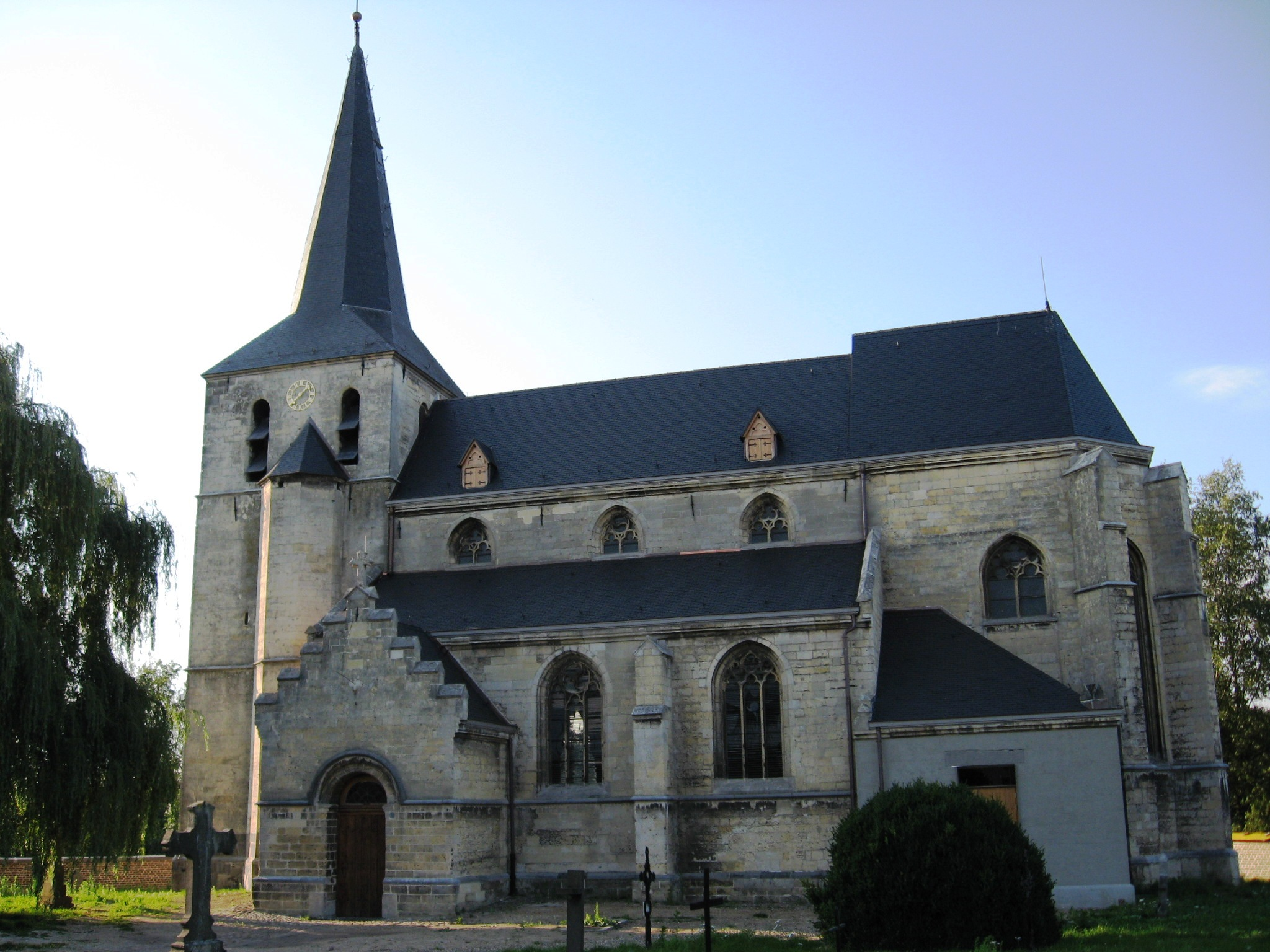
- St. Aldegonde's church

- Flag Coat of arms

- Location of As in Limburg
- Interactive map of As
- Location in Belgium
- Coordinates: 51°00′N 05°35′E
- Country: Belgium
- Community: Flemish Community
- Region: Flemish Region
- Province: Limburg
- Arrondissement: Hasselt

Government
  - Mayor: Tom Seurs (Lijst Voluit!)
  - Governing party: Lijst Voluit!

Area
  - Total: 22.13 km^{2} (8.54 sq mi)

Population (2018-01-01)
  - Total: 8,190
  - Density: 370/km^{2} (959/sq mi)
- Postal codes: 3665, 3668
- NIS code: 71002
- Area codes: 089
- Website: www.as.be

As (Dutch pronunciation: [ɑs]) is a municipality located in the Belgian province of Limburg. On January 1, 2006, As had a total population of 7,497. The total area is 22.07 km^{2} which gives a population density of 340 inhabitants per km^{2}.

== History ==
In 1971 the municipality was formed by the merger of two villages - As and Niel-bij-As, which both lie on the Bosbeek brook on the Campine plateau between the rivers Demer and Meuse.

The location of the settlements close to a water course in this dry region gave rise to the villages' names: "As" is a prehistoric name for water ("Aska") which first referred to the Bosbeek brook and later the village itself.

Archaeological finds indicate an early prehistoric settlement, including objects made of flint dating from the earliest Stone Age. The area was inhabited from 500 BC as shown by a cemetery in the field between Genk and As. The Romans built the road from Tongeren to Venlo via Munsterbilzen and As. The current road next to the brook and the roads to Niel and Dorne follow the course of the Roman road. However, the Romans did not establish any settlements in the area as the sandy soil was not fertile enough. After the fall of Rome, the Francs invaded the area and established themselves in As. The Merovingian cemetery indicates that As was an important village from 500 - 700. The region started to be Christianised from the eighth century, and the first church was built on the site of the current Saint Aldegonde's Church. The church is first mentioned in a letter dated 1108 in which Otbert, Prince-Bishop of Luik reported to the abbey of Rolduc about "income from the churches of Riemst, Genk, As and Gellik".

Niel was first mentioned in a charter of 1253 in which Arnold, Earl of Borgloon, was granted the Villa of Dilsen with Niel and the castle of Stokkem. In 1299 the Earl of Borgloon was recorded appointing Arnold van Gellik as pastor of As. In 1303 the Abbey was granted a perpetual lease on the village of As. The people of Niel, however, still relied on Dilsen for religious obligations, until 1721 when Pastor Bex from Dilsen created Niel as an independent parish. Bex's cousin Adam Dellecomminne became the first pastor of Niel.

Since the early Middle Ages, the original oak and birch forests were cleared more and more for agriculture and heathland fields. The present hamlets, of which Oeleinde is the oldest, developed into a farming village. In 1901 the first coal was discovered in As, which led to the industrialisation of the region. Now, As is mainly a residential municipality set along large heathland fields and woodland areas.

== Mayors ==
- 1873 - 1908 : Jan Matthijs Theunissen
- 1909 - 1927 : Jacobus Janssen
- 1927 - 1933 : Joseph Weytjens
- 1933 - 1935 : Désiré Colemont
- 1935 - 1941 : Louis Huveners
- 1941 - 1944 : Jan Lambert Dexters
- 1944 - 1947 : Koen Lagaert
- 1947 - 1953 : Hubert Hoogmartens
- 1953 - 1959 : Gisbert Marting
- 1959 - 1971 : Albert Jorissen
- 1971 - 1977 : Pierre Tilmans
- 1977 - 1983 : Albert Jorissen
- 1983 - 2006 : Jos Truyen
- 2007 - 2016: Miel Craeghs
- 2017 - : Tom Seurs

== Sights ==
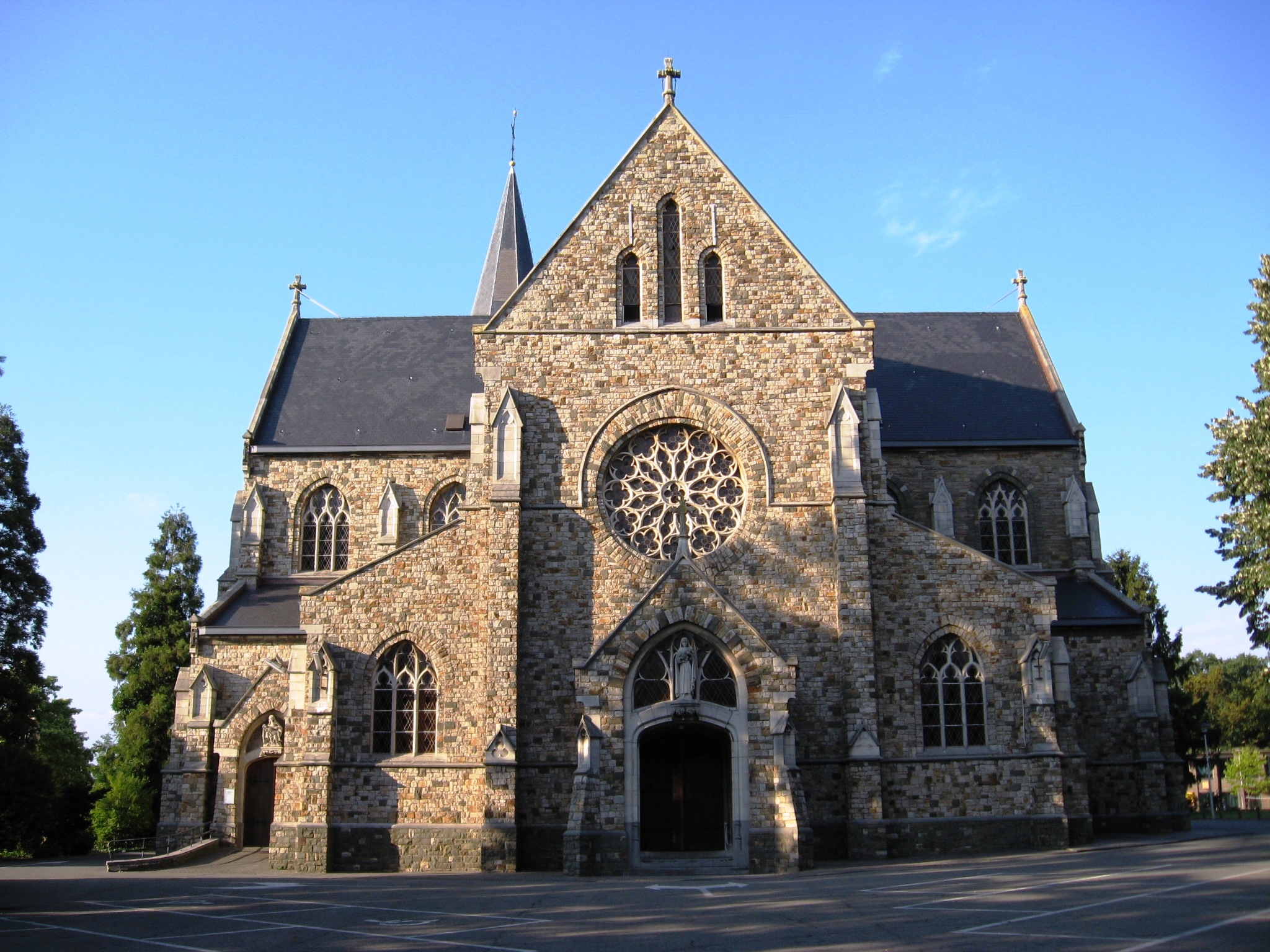
St Theresa's church

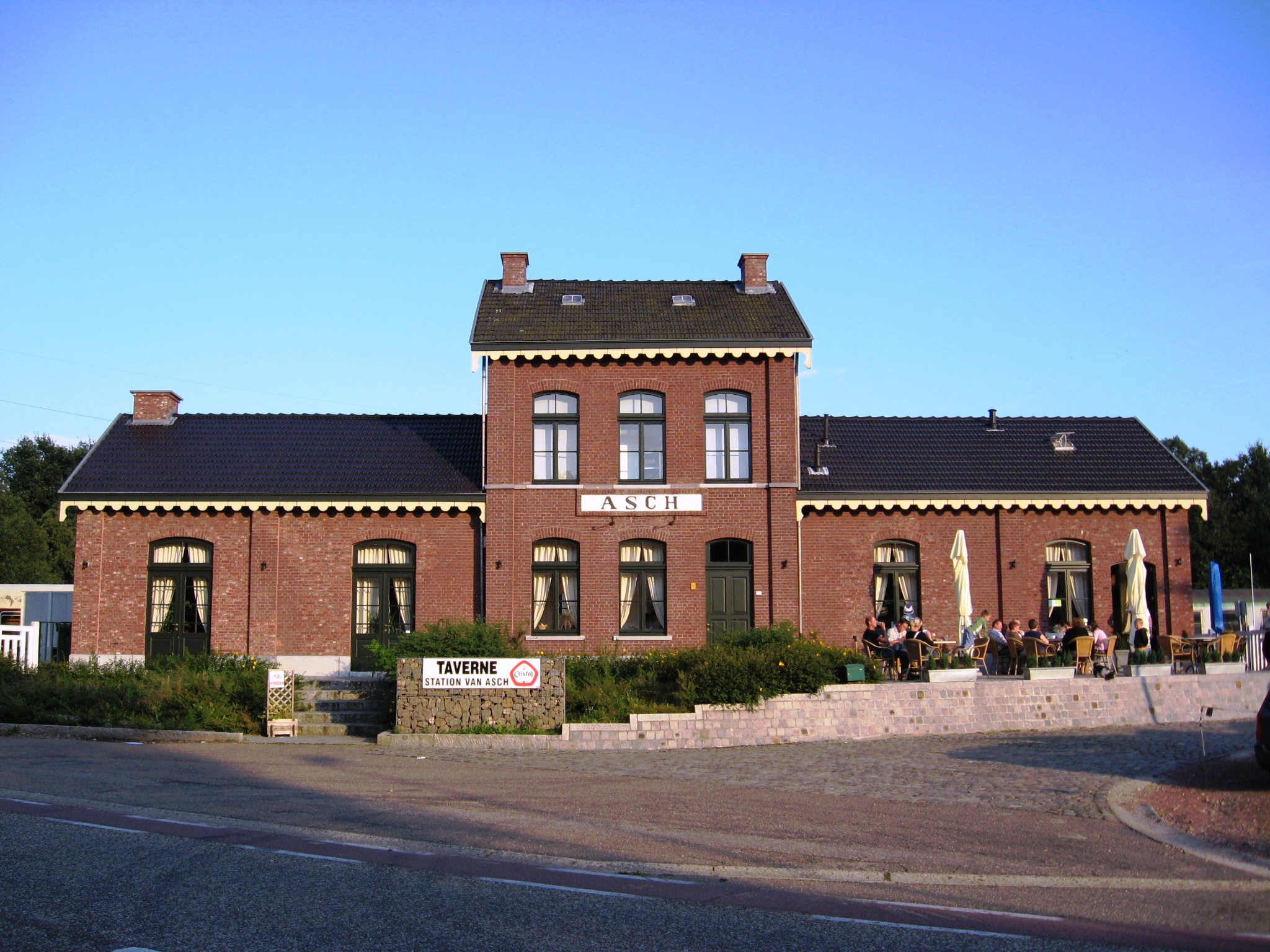
The restored As station building

- The restored church of St Aldegonde
- The church of St Theresa, dating from 1930 to 1932
- The Kolenspoor (Coal Track), an association of volunteers who present guided tours of the historic route of the former railway line from Waterschei to Eisden via As
- The former railway station, the oldest in Limburg, now restored as a pub (the Kolenspoor) and the entrance to the Campine National Park
- The André Dumont Monument, erected on the very spot where the first coal was struck in 1901
- Two historic water mills
