= Meeuwen-Gruitrode =

Meeuwen-Gruitrode Miëve-Roy
- Village
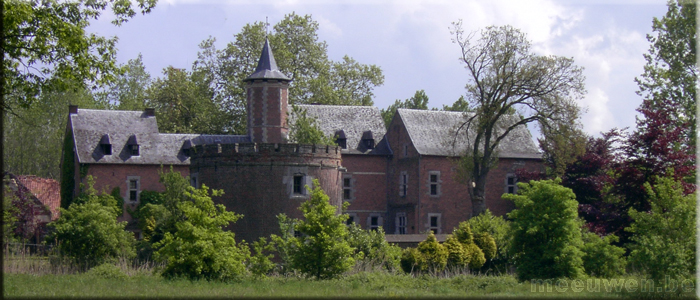

- Flag Seal

- Location in Belgium
- Coordinates: 51°06′N 05°31′E
- Country: Belgium
- Region: Flemish Region
- Province: Limburg
- Municipality: Oudsbergen

Area
  - Total: 91.31 km^{2} (35.25 sq mi)

Population (2021)
  - Total: 13,117
  - Density: 143.7/km^{2} (372.1/sq mi)
- Time zone: CET
- Website: www.meeuwen-gruitrode.be

Meeuwen-Gruitrode (Dutch pronunciation: [ˌmeːu.ə(ŋ)ˈɣrœytˌroːdə]; Limburgish: Miëve-Roj, [ˈmiəvəˈʀɔj]) is a former municipality located in the Belgian province of Limburg. In 2021, Meeuwen-Gruitrode had a total population of 13,117. The total area is 91.31 km^{2}.

The municipality consisted of the following sub-municipalities: Meeuwen, Gruitrode, Ellikom, Neerglabbeek, and Wijshagen. It also includes the hamlets of Muisven, Ophoven, Zoetebeek, Koestraat, and Plokrooi.

Effective 1 January 2019, Opglabbeek and Meeuwen-Gruitrode were merged into the new municipality of Oudsbergen.
