= Oudsbergen =

- Municipality
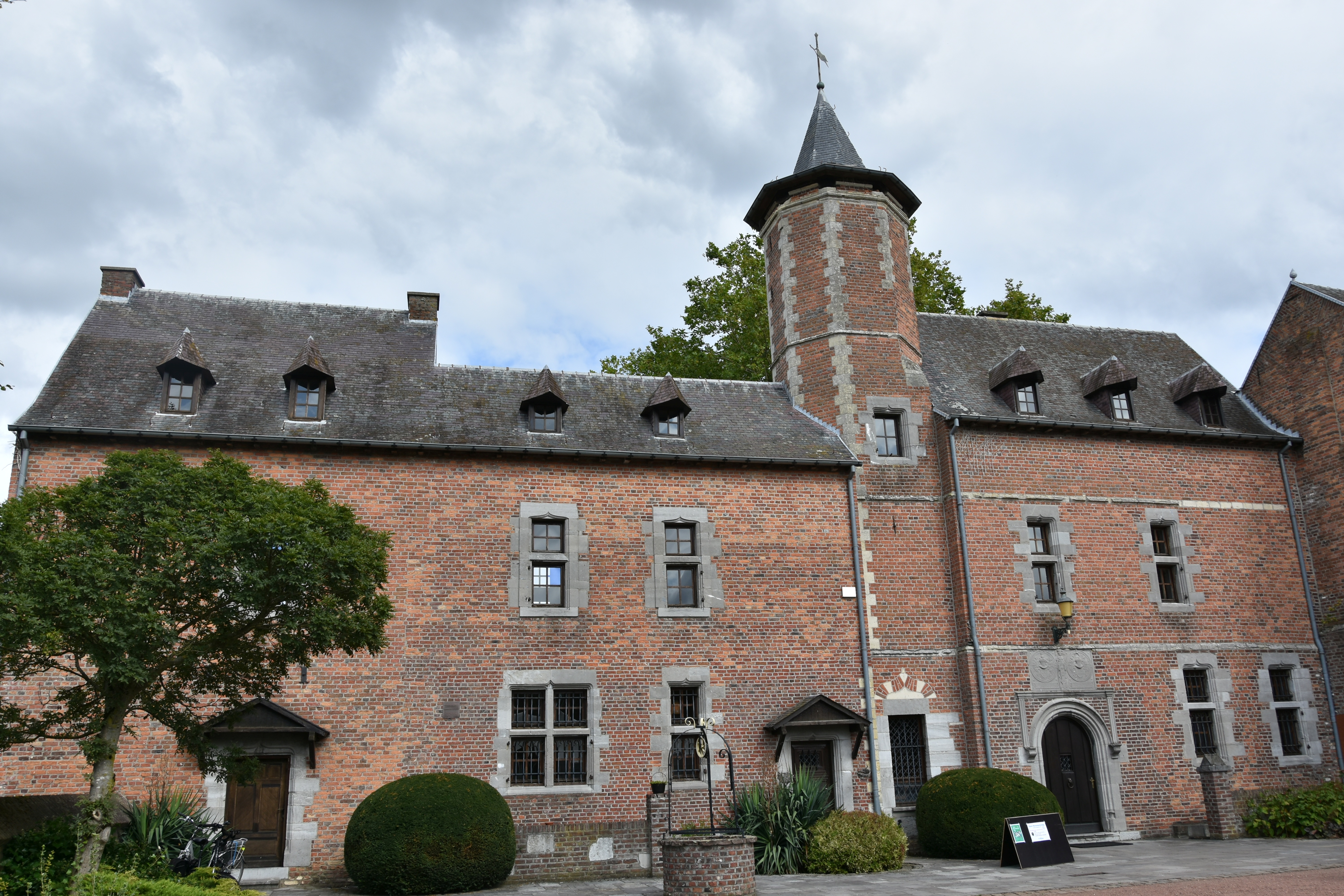
- Commandery of Gruitrode

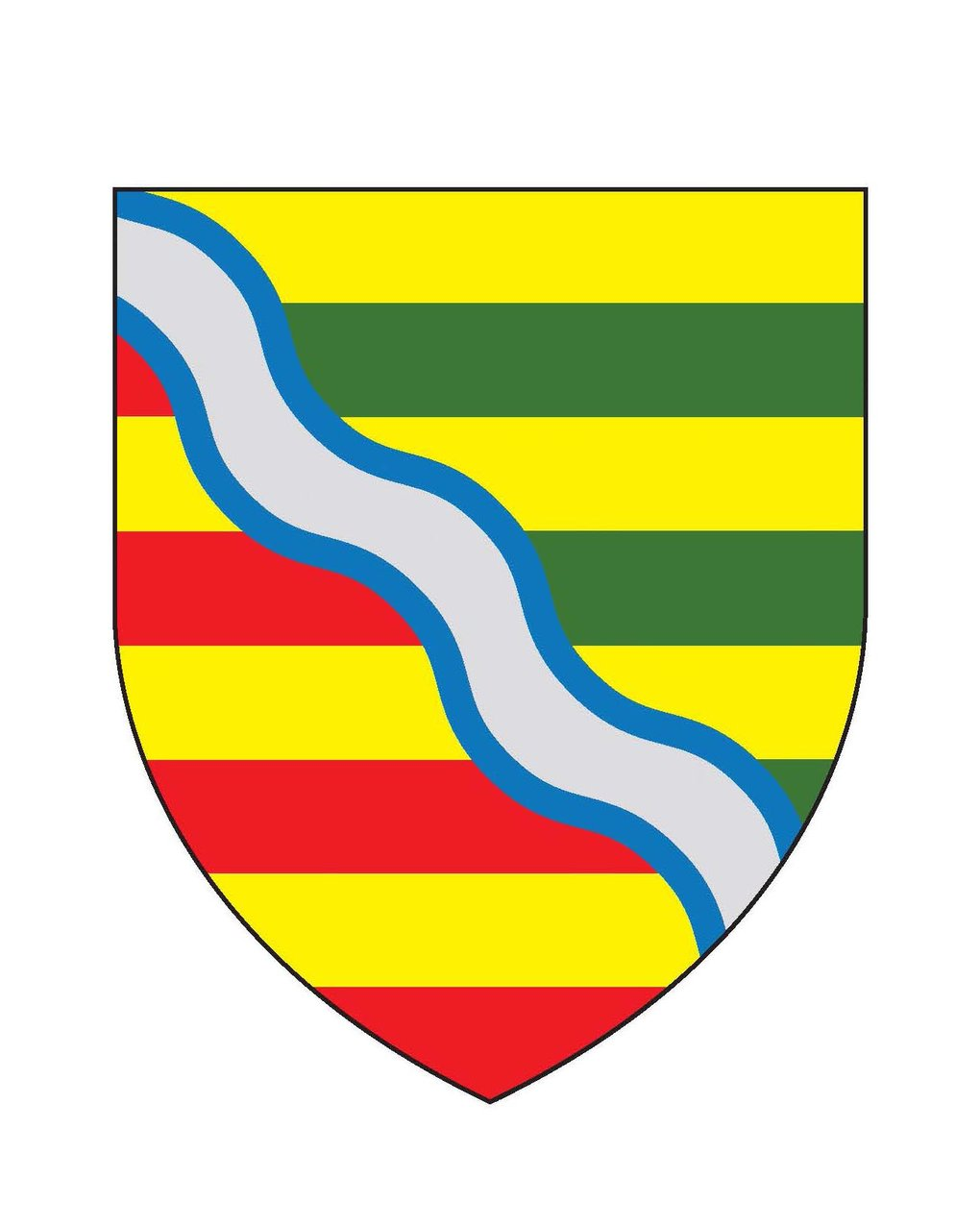
- Flag Coat of arms

- Location of Oudsbergen in Limburg
- Interactive map of Oudsbergen
- Location in Belgium
- Coordinates: 51.0866°N 5.5885°E
- Country: Belgium
- Community: Flemish Community
- Region: Flemish Region
- Province: Limburg
- Arrondissement: Maaseik

Government
  - Mayor: Marco Goossens (CD&V)
  - Governing party: CD&V

Area
  - Total: 116.37 km^{2} (44.93 sq mi)

Population (2022-01-01)
  - Total: 23,611
  - Density: 202.90/km^{2} (525.50/sq mi)
- Postal codes: 3660, 3670
- NIS code: 72042
- Area codes: 011, 089
- Website: oudsbergen.be

Oudsbergen (Dutch pronunciation: [ˈʌutsˌbɛrɣə(n)]; Limburgish: Audsberge [ˈawtsbæʀ(ə)ɣə]) is a municipality in the Belgian province of Limburg that arose on 1 January 2019 from the merging of the municipalities of Opglabbeek and Meeuwen-Gruitrode.

The merged municipality has an area of 116.24 km^{2} and a population of 23,520 people in 2021.

== Creation ==
The Flemish Government provides incentives for municipalities to voluntarily merge. The municipal councils of Opglabbeek and Meeuwen-Gruitrode approved a merge in principle in November 2016. Definitive approval occurred on 26 June 2017, which was ratified by Flemish decree of 4 May 2018 alongside several other merges, all to be effective per 1 January 2019.

As of 1 January 2018, the municipality of Opglabbeek had a population of 10,332 and Meeuwen-Gruitrode a population of 13,091.

== Government ==
The first elections for the new municipality were held during the regular local elections of 14 October 2018, electing a municipal council for the legislative period of 2019–2024. CD&V obtained a majority of seats in the municipal council (17 out of 27). Lode Ceyssens, who was mayor of Meeuwen-Gruitrode until then, became mayor of Oudsbergen.
