= List of municipalities of the Flemish Region =

At the creation of Belgium in 1831, there were 2,739 municipalities in the country, which had fallen to 2,663 municipalities by 1961. Following a series of decisions and actions, carried out in 1975, 1983, 2019, and 2025 the fusion of the Belgian municipalities reduced the national total to 565 municipalities. Of these, the following is a list of the 285 municipalities in the Flemish Region of Belgium. The numbers refer to the location of the municipalities on the maps of the respective provinces. (Note: The maps have not been updated for the 1 January 2019 merger of fifteen Flemish municipalities into seven, as explained in the remainder of these notes)

== List ==
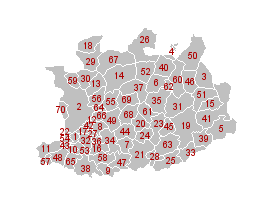
Antwerp (Note: (Antwerp) Puurs-Sint-Amands = #48 Puurs + #57 Sint-Amands)

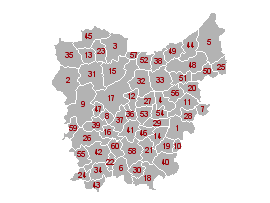
East Flanders

Flemish Brabant

West Flanders

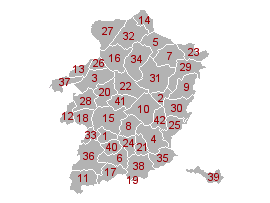
Limburg

Name	Arrondissement	Province	#
Aalst	Aalst	East Flanders	1
Aalter	Ghent	East Flanders	2
Aarschot	Leuven	Flemish Brabant	1
Aartselaar	Antwerp	Antwerp	1
Affligem	Halle-Vilvoorde	Flemish Brabant	2
Alken	Tongeren	Limburg	1
Alveringem	Veurne	West Flanders	1
Antwerp	Antwerp	Antwerp	2
Anzegem	Kortrijk	West Flanders	2
Ardooie	Tielt	West Flanders	3
Arendonk	Turnhout	Antwerp	3
As	Hasselt	Limburg	2
Asse	Halle-Vilvoorde	Flemish Brabant	3
Assenede	Eeklo	East Flanders	3
Avelgem	Kortrijk	West Flanders	4
Baarle-Hertog	Turnhout	Antwerp	4
Balen	Turnhout	Antwerp	5
Beernem	Bruges	West Flanders	5
Beerse	Turnhout	Antwerp	6
Beersel	Halle-Vilvoorde	Flemish Brabant	4
Begijnendijk	Leuven	Flemish Brabant	5
Bekkevoort	Leuven	Flemish Brabant	6
Beringen	Hasselt	Limburg	3
Berlaar	Mechelen	Antwerp	7
Berlare	Dendermonde	East Flanders	4
Bertem	Leuven	Flemish Brabant	7
Bever	Halle-Vilvoorde	Flemish Brabant	8
Beveren-Kruibeke-Zwijndrecht	Sint-Niklaas	East Flanders	?
Bierbeek	Leuven	Flemish Brabant	9
Bilzen-Hoeselt	Tongeren	Limburg	?
Blankenberge	Bruges	West Flanders	6
Bocholt	Maaseik	Limburg	5
Boechout	Antwerp	Antwerp	8
Bonheiden	Mechelen	Antwerp	9
Boom	Antwerp	Antwerp	10
Boortmeerbeek	Leuven	Flemish Brabant	10
Bornem	Mechelen	Antwerp	11
Boutersem	Leuven	Flemish Brabant	11
Brakel	Oudenaarde	East Flanders	6
Brasschaat	Antwerp	Antwerp	13
Brecht	Antwerp	Antwerp	14
Bredene	Ostend	West Flanders	7
Bree	Maaseik	Limburg	7
Bruges	Bruges	West Flanders	8
Buggenhout	Dendermonde	East Flanders	7
Damme	Bruges	West Flanders	9
Deerlijk	Kortrijk	West Flanders	12
De Haan	Ostend	West Flanders	10
Deinze	Ghent	East Flanders	9
Denderleeuw	Aalst	East Flanders	10
Dendermonde	Dendermonde	East Flanders	11
Dentergem	Tielt	West Flanders	13
De Panne	Veurne	West Flanders	11
Dessel	Turnhout	Antwerp	15
Destelbergen	Ghent	East Flanders	12
Diepenbeek	Hasselt	Limburg	8
Diest	Leuven	Flemish Brabant	12
Diksmuide	Diksmuide	West Flanders	14
Dilbeek	Halle-Vilvoorde	Flemish Brabant	13
Dilsen-Stokkem	Maaseik	Limburg	9
Drogenbos	Halle-Vilvoorde	Flemish Brabant	14
Duffel	Mechelen	Antwerp	16
Edegem	Antwerp	Antwerp	17
Eeklo	Eeklo	East Flanders	13
Erpe-Mere	Aalst	East Flanders	14
Essen	Antwerp	Antwerp	18
Evergem	Ghent	East Flanders	15
Gavere	Ghent	East Flanders	16
Geel	Turnhout	Antwerp	19
Geetbets	Leuven	Flemish Brabant	16
Genk	Hasselt	Limburg	10
Geraardsbergen	Aalst	East Flanders	18
Ghent	Ghent	East Flanders	17
Gingelom	Hasselt	Limburg	11
Gistel	Ostend	West Flanders	15
Glabbeek	Leuven	Flemish Brabant	17
Grimbergen	Halle-Vilvoorde	Flemish Brabant	19
Grobbendonk	Turnhout	Antwerp	20
Haacht	Leuven	Flemish Brabant	20
Haaltert	Aalst	East Flanders	19
Halen	Hasselt	Limburg	12
Halle	Halle-Vilvoorde	Flemish Brabant	21
Hamme	Dendermonde	East Flanders	20
Hamont-Achel	Maaseik	Limburg	14
Harelbeke	Kortrijk	West Flanders	16
Hasselt	Hasselt	Limburg	15
Hechtel-Eksel	Maaseik	Limburg	16
Heers	Tongeren	Limburg	17
Heist-op-den-Berg	Mechelen	Antwerp	21
Hemiksem	Antwerp	Antwerp	22
Herent	Leuven	Flemish Brabant	22
Herentals	Turnhout	Antwerp	23
Herenthout	Turnhout	Antwerp	24
Herk-de-Stad	Hasselt	Limburg	18
Herselt	Turnhout	Antwerp	25
Herstappe	Tongeren	Limburg	19
Herzele	Aalst	East Flanders	21
Heusden-Zolder	Hasselt	Limburg	20
Heuvelland	Ypres	West Flanders	17
Hoegaarden	Leuven	Flemish Brabant	24
Hoeilaart	Halle-Vilvoorde	Flemish Brabant	25
Holsbeek	Leuven	Flemish Brabant	26
Hooglede	Roeselare	West Flanders	18
Hoogstraten	Turnhout	Antwerp	26
Horebeke	Oudenaarde	East Flanders	22
Houthalen-Helchteren	Maaseik	Limburg	22
Houthulst	Diksmuide	West Flanders	19
Hove	Antwerp	Antwerp	27
Huldenberg	Leuven	Flemish Brabant	27
Hulshout	Turnhout	Antwerp	28
Ichtegem	Ostend	West Flanders	20
Ingelmunster	Roeselare	West Flanders	22
Izegem	Roeselare	West Flanders	23
Jabbeke	Bruges	West Flanders	24
Kalmthout	Antwerp	Antwerp	29
Kampenhout	Halle-Vilvoorde	Flemish Brabant	28
Kapellen	Antwerp	Antwerp	30
Kapelle-op-den-Bos	Halle-Vilvoorde	Flemish Brabant	29
Kaprijke	Eeklo	East Flanders	23
Kasterlee	Turnhout	Antwerp	31
Keerbergen	Leuven	Flemish Brabant	30
Kinrooi	Maaseik	Limburg	23
Kluisbergen	Oudenaarde	East Flanders	24
Knokke-Heist	Bruges	West Flanders	25
Koekelare	Diksmuide	West Flanders	26
Koksijde	Veurne	West Flanders	27
Kontich	Antwerp	Antwerp	32
Kortemark	Diksmuide	West Flanders	28
Kortenaken	Leuven	Flemish Brabant	31
Kortenberg	Leuven	Flemish Brabant	32
Kortrijk	Kortrijk	West Flanders	29
Kraainem	Halle-Vilvoorde	Flemish Brabant	33
Kruisem	Oudenaarde	East Flanders	26
Kuurne	Kortrijk	West Flanders	30
Laakdal	Turnhout	Antwerp	33
Laarne	Dendermonde	East Flanders	27
Lanaken	Tongeren	Limburg	25
Landen	Leuven	Flemish Brabant	34
Langemark-Poelkapelle	Ypres	West Flanders	31
Lebbeke	Dendermonde	East Flanders	28
Lede	Aalst	East Flanders	29
Ledegem	Roeselare	West Flanders	32
Lendelede	Kortrijk	West Flanders	33
Lennik	Halle-Vilvoorde	Flemish Brabant	35
Leopoldsburg	Hasselt	Limburg	26
Leuven	Leuven	Flemish Brabant	36
Lichtervelde	Roeselare	West Flanders	34
Liedekerke	Halle-Vilvoorde	Flemish Brabant	37
Lier	Mechelen	Antwerp	34
Lierde	Oudenaarde	East Flanders	30
Lievegem	Ghent	East Flanders	31
Lille	Turnhout	Antwerp	35
Linkebeek	Halle-Vilvoorde	Flemish Brabant	38
Lint	Antwerp	Antwerp	36
Linter	Leuven	Flemish Brabant	39
Lochristi	Ghent	East Flanders	32
Lokeren	Sint-Niklaas	East Flanders	33
Lommel	Maaseik	Limburg	27
Londerzeel	Halle-Vilvoorde	Flemish Brabant	40
Lo-Reninge	Diksmuide	West Flanders	35
Lubbeek	Leuven	Flemish Brabant	41
Lummen	Hasselt	Limburg	28
Maarkedal	Oudenaarde	East Flanders	34
Maaseik	Maaseik	Limburg	29
Maasmechelen	Tongeren	Limburg	30
Machelen	Halle-Vilvoorde	Flemish Brabant	42
Maldegem	Eeklo	East Flanders	35
Malle	Antwerp	Antwerp	37
Mechelen	Mechelen	Antwerp	38
Meerhout	Turnhout	Antwerp	39
Meise	Halle-Vilvoorde	Flemish Brabant	43
Menen	Kortrijk	West Flanders	36
Merchtem	Halle-Vilvoorde	Flemish Brabant	44
Merelbeke-Melle	Ghent	East Flanders	?
Merksplas	Turnhout	Antwerp	40
Mesen	Ypres	West Flanders	37
Middelkerke	Ostend	West Flanders	39
Mol	Turnhout	Antwerp	41
Moorslede	Roeselare	West Flanders	40
Mortsel	Antwerp	Antwerp	42
Nazareth-De Pinte	Ghent	East Flanders	?
Niel	Antwerp	Antwerp	43
Nieuwerkerken	Hasselt	Limburg	33
Nieuwpoort	Veurne	West Flanders	41
Nijlen	Mechelen	Antwerp	44
Ninove	Aalst	East Flanders	40
Olen	Turnhout	Antwerp	45
Oosterzele	Ghent	East Flanders	41
Oostkamp	Bruges	West Flanders	43
Oostrozebeke	Tielt	West Flanders	44
Opwijk	Halle-Vilvoorde	Flemish Brabant	45
Ostend	Ostend	West Flanders	42
Oudenaarde	Oudenaarde	East Flanders	42
Oudenburg	Ostend	West Flanders	45
Oudsbergen	Maaseik	Limburg	31
Oud-Heverlee	Leuven	Flemish Brabant	46
Oud-Turnhout	Turnhout	Antwerp	46
Overijse	Halle-Vilvoorde	Flemish Brabant	47
Pajottegem	Halle-Vilvoorde	Flemish Brabant	?
Peer	Maaseik	Limburg	34
Pelt	Maaseik	Limburg	32
Pepingen	Halle-Vilvoorde	Flemish Brabant	48
Pittem	Tielt	West Flanders	46
Poperinge	Ypres	West Flanders	47
Putte	Mechelen	Antwerp	47
Puurs-Sint-Amands	Mechelen	Antwerp	48+57
Ranst	Antwerp	Antwerp	49
Ravels	Turnhout	Antwerp	50
Retie	Turnhout	Antwerp	51
Riemst	Tongeren	Limburg	35
Rijkevorsel	Turnhout	Antwerp	52
Roeselare	Roeselare	West Flanders	48
Ronse	Oudenaarde	East Flanders	43
Roosdaal	Halle-Vilvoorde	Flemish Brabant	49
Rotselaar	Leuven	Flemish Brabant	50
Rumst	Antwerp	Antwerp	53
Schelle	Antwerp	Antwerp	54
Scherpenheuvel-Zichem	Leuven	Flemish Brabant	51
Schilde	Antwerp	Antwerp	55
Schoten	Antwerp	Antwerp	56
Sint-Genesius-Rode	Halle-Vilvoorde	Flemish Brabant	52
Sint-Gillis-Waas	Sint-Niklaas	East Flanders	44
Sint-Katelijne-Waver	Mechelen	Antwerp	58
Sint-Laureins	Eeklo	East Flanders	45
Sint-Lievens-Houtem	Aalst	East Flanders	46
Sint-Martens-Latem	Ghent	East Flanders	47
Sint-Niklaas	Sint-Niklaas	East Flanders	48
Sint-Pieters-Leeuw	Halle-Vilvoorde	Flemish Brabant	53
Sint-Truiden	Hasselt	Limburg	36
Spiere-Helkijn	Kortrijk	West Flanders	50
Stabroek	Antwerp	Antwerp	59
Staden	Roeselare	West Flanders	51
Steenokkerzeel	Halle-Vilvoorde	Flemish Brabant	54
Stekene	Sint-Niklaas	East Flanders	49
Temse	Sint-Niklaas	East Flanders	50
Ternat	Halle-Vilvoorde	Flemish Brabant	55
Tervuren	Leuven	Flemish Brabant	56
Tessenderlo-Ham	Hasselt	Limburg	?
Tielt	Tielt	West Flanders	52
Tielt-Winge	Leuven	Flemish Brabant	57
Tienen	Leuven	Flemish Brabant	58
Tongeren-Borgloon	Tongeren	Limburg	?
Torhout	Bruges	West Flanders	53
Tremelo	Leuven	Flemish Brabant	59
Turnhout	Turnhout	Antwerp	60
Veurne	Veurne	West Flanders	54
Vilvoorde	Halle-Vilvoorde	Flemish Brabant	60
Vleteren	Ypres	West Flanders	55
Voeren	Tongeren	Limburg	39
Vorselaar	Turnhout	Antwerp	61
Vosselaar	Turnhout	Antwerp	62
Waasmunster	Dendermonde	East Flanders	51
Waregem	Kortrijk	West Flanders	56
Wellen	Tongeren	Limburg	40
Wemmel	Halle-Vilvoorde	Flemish Brabant	61
Wervik	Ypres	West Flanders	57
Westerlo	Turnhout	Antwerp	63
Wetteren	Dendermonde	East Flanders	53
Wevelgem	Kortrijk	West Flanders	58
Wezembeek-Oppem	Halle-Vilvoorde	Flemish Brabant	62
Wichelen	Dendermonde	East Flanders	54
Wielsbeke	Tielt	West Flanders	59
Wijnegem	Antwerp	Antwerp	64
Willebroek	Mechelen	Antwerp	65
Wingene	Tielt	West Flanders	60
Wommelgem	Antwerp	Antwerp	66
Wortegem-Petegem	Oudenaarde	East Flanders	55
Wuustwezel	Antwerp	Antwerp	67
Ypres	Ypres	West Flanders	21
Zandhoven	Antwerp	Antwerp	68
Zaventem	Halle-Vilvoorde	Flemish Brabant	63
Zedelgem	Bruges	West Flanders	61
Zele	Dendermonde	East Flanders	56
Zelzate	Eeklo	East Flanders	57
Zemst	Halle-Vilvoorde	Flemish Brabant	64
Zoersel	Antwerp	Antwerp	69
Zonhoven	Hasselt	Limburg	41
Zonnebeke	Ypres	West Flanders	62
Zottegem	Aalst	East Flanders	58
Zoutleeuw	Leuven	Flemish Brabant	65
Zuienkerke	Bruges	West Flanders	63
Zulte	Ghent	East Flanders	59
Zutendaal	Hasselt	Limburg	42
Zwalm	Oudenaarde	East Flanders	60
Zwevegem	Kortrijk	West Flanders	64

== See also ==
- List of municipalities of Belgium
- List of cities in Flanders
