= Arrondissement of Bruges =

Arrondissement in Flanders, Belgium

Arrondissement of Bruges Arrondissement Brugge
- Arrondissement
- Location of the arrondissement in West Flanders
- Coordinates: 51.2°N 3.2°E
- Country: Belgium
- Region: Flanders
- Province: West Flanders
- Municipalities: 10

Area
  - Total: 661.29 km^{2} (255.33 sq mi)

Population (1 January 2017)
  - Total: 281,256
  - Density: 425.31/km^{2} (1,101.6/sq mi)
- Time zone: UTC+1 (CET)
  - Summer (DST): UTC+2 (CEST)

The Arrondissement of Bruges (Dutch: Arrondissement Brugge; French: Arrondissement de Bruges) is one of the eight administrative arrondissements in the Province of West Flanders, Belgium.

It is both an administrative and a judicial arrondissement. However, the Judicial Arrondissement of Bruges also comprises the municipalities of the Arrondissement of Ostend, most of the Arrondissement of Tielt (except the municipalities of Meulebeke, Dentergem, Oostrozebeke and Wielsbeke), as well as the municipality of Lichtervelde (in the Arrondissement of Roeselare).

== History ==
The Arrondissement of Bruges was created in 1800 as the first arrondissement in the Department of Lys (Dutch: Departement Leie). It originally comprised the cantons of Ardooie, Bruges, Gistel, Ostend, Ruiselede, Tielt and Torhout. In 1818, the arrondissements of Ostend, Roeselare, Tielt and Torhout were created. This resulted in the arrondissement losing more than half of its territory.

The Arrondissement of Torhout already ceased to exist in 1823 and the canton of Torhout was added to the Arrondissement of Bruges again. As a result of the merger of the municipalities of 1977, the village of Wijnendale (which was added to Torhout and was part of Ichtegem prior to that) was added to the arrondissement from the Arrondissement of Ostend and the then municipality of Wenduine (which was merged into De Haan) was ceded to the Arrondissement of Ostend.

== Municipalities ==
The Administrative Arrondissement of Bruges consists of the following municipalities:

- Beernem
- Blankenberge
- Bruges
- Damme
- Jabbeke
- Knokke-Heist
- Oostkamp
- Torhout
- Zedelgem
- Zuienkerke
