= List of cities in Flanders =

This is a list of cities in Flanders, the northern part of Belgium. The status of "city" is historical and does not necessarily mean it has a high number of inhabitants: see city status in Belgium for more information.

Brussels is not listed because it is not part of the Flemish Region; it is however included in the Flemish Community.

City name	Arrondissement	Province	Inhabitants (1/1/2017)
Aalst	Aalst	East Flanders	84,859
Aarschot	Leuven	Flemish Brabant	29,654
Antwerp	Antwerp	Antwerp	520,504
Beringen	Hasselt	Limburg	45,704
Bilzen	Tongeren	Limburg	32,151
Blankenberge	Bruges	West Flanders	20,265
Borgloon	Tongeren	Limburg	10,668
Bree	Maaseik	Limburg	15,911
Bruges	Bruges	West Flanders	118,187
Damme	Bruges	West Flanders	10,945
Deinze	Ghent	East Flanders	30,906
Dendermonde	Dendermonde	East Flanders	45,583
Diest	Leuven	Flemish Brabant	23,612
Diksmuide	Diksmuide	West Flanders	16,719
Dilsen-Stokkem	Maaseik	Limburg	20,310
Eeklo	Eeklo	East Flanders	20,708
Geel	Turnhout	Antwerp	39,560
Genk	Hasselt	Limburg	65,986
Ghent	Gent	East Flanders	259,083
Geraardsbergen	Aalst	East Flanders	33,204
Gistel	Ostend	West Flanders	12,021
Halen	Hasselt	Limburg	9,511
Halle	Halle-Vilvoorde	Flemish Brabant	38,680
Hamont-Achel	Maaseik	Limburg	14,427
Harelbeke	Kortrijk	West Flanders	27,683
Hasselt	Hasselt	Limburg	77,124
Herentals	Turnhout	Antwerp	27,800
Herk-de-Stad	Hasselt	Limburg	12,694
Hoogstraten	Turnhout	Antwerp	21,300
Ypres	Ypres	West Flanders	35,014
Izegem	Roeselare	West Flanders	27,590
Kortrijk	Kortrijk	West Flanders	75,736
Landen	Leuven	Flemish Brabant	15,919
Leuven	Leuven	Flemish Brabant	100,291
Lier	Mechelen	Antwerp	35,244
Lo-Reninge	Diksmuide	West Flanders	3,288
Lokeren	Sint-Niklaas	East Flanders	41,057
Lommel	Maaseik	Limburg	33,996
Maaseik	Maaseik	Limburg	25,233
Mechelen	Mechelen	Antwerp	85,665
Menen	Kortrijk	West Flanders	33,112
Mesen	Ypres	West Flanders	1,049
Mortsel	Antwerp	Antwerp	25,588
Nieuwpoort	Veurne	West Flanders	11,351
Ninove	Aalst	East Flanders	38,446
Ostend	Ostend	West Flanders	70,994
Oudenaarde	Oudenaarde	East Flanders	30,972
Oudenburg	Ostend	West Flanders	9,325
Peer	Maaseik	Limburg	16,427
Poperinge	Ypres	West Flanders	19,735
Roeselare	Roeselare	West Flanders	61,657
Ronse	Oudenaarde	East Flanders	26,092
Scherpenheuvel-Zichem	Leuven	Flemish Brabant	22,924
Sint-Niklaas	Sint-Niklaas	East Flanders	76,028
Sint-Truiden	Hasselt	Limburg	40,169
Tielt	Tielt	West Flanders	20,301
Tienen	Leuven	Flemish Brabant	34,365
Tongeren	Tongeren	Limburg	30,865
Torhout	Bruges	West Flanders	20,503
Turnhout	Turnhout	Antwerp	43,467
Veurne	Veurne	West Flanders	11,727
Vilvoorde	Halle-Vilvoorde	Flemish Brabant	43,653
Waregem	Kortrijk	West Flanders	37,871
Wervik	Ypres	West Flanders	18,689
Zottegem	Aalst	East Flanders	26,137
Zoutleeuw	Leuven	Flemish Brabant	8,446

== See also ==
- City status in Belgium
- List of cities in Belgium
- List of cities in Wallonia
- List of municipalities of the Flemish Region
