= Arrondissement of Tielt =

Arrondissement of Tielt Arrondissement Tielt
- Arrondissement
- Location of the arrondissement in West Flanders
- Coordinates: 51.0°N 3.3°E
- Country: Belgium
- Region: Flanders
- Province: West Flanders
- Municipalities: 7

Area
  - Total: 329.79 km^{2} (127.33 sq mi)

Population (1 January 2017)
  - Total: 92,355
  - Density: 280.04/km^{2} (725.31/sq mi)
- Time zone: UTC+1 (CET)
  - Summer (DST): UTC+2 (CEST)

The Arrondissement of Tielt (Dutch: Arrondissement Tielt; French: Arrondissement de Tielt) is one of the eight administrative arrondissements in the Province of West Flanders, Belgium.

== History ==
The Arrondissement of Tielt was created in 1818 and originally comprised the cantons of Ruiselede and Tielt, which were ceded from the Arrondissement of Bruges, and the canton of Meulebeke, which was ceded from the Arrondissement of Kortrijk. In 1823, the Arrondissement of Torhout and Wakken ceased to exist and, as a result, a number of municipalities which had previously been a part of the Arrondissement of Torhout and the canton of Oostrozebeke were added to the arrondissement.

The municipality of Ardooie was added in 1977 from the Arrondissement of Roeselare.

== Municipalities ==
The administrative arrondissement of Tielt consists of the following municipalities:

- Ardooie
- Dentergem
- Oostrozebeke
- Pittem
- Tielt
- Wielsbeke
- Wingene
