= City status in Belgium =

Title for selected municipalities

City status in Belgium is granted to a select group of municipalities by a royal decree or by an act of law.

== History ==
Tongeren is the oldest city in Belgium, receiving its city status (municipium) in the second century CE. It is the only city in Belgium to have been granted city status by the Romans.

During the Middle Ages, towns had defined privileges over surrounding villages. As the nobility strengthened their power over regions in feudal Europe, they bestowed on towns the rights to organize annual fairs, levy tolls or build walls and other defense works. Under the French occupation of Belgian provinces, these privileges were abolished and replaced by an honorific title of city (Dutch: stad, French: ville). This was imposed upon the Belgian provinces by order of the French Convention Nationale on 2 Brumaire Year II (23 October 1793). A number of towns lost their title of city.

At the time of Dutch rule and incorporation into the United Kingdom of the Netherlands (1815–1830), some towns recovered their city title. On 30 May 1825, a royal decree was published and included the list of the towns that were granted the title. Even with Belgian independence (1831-) this list was scarcely changed. After the merging of municipalities throughout Belgium in 1977, some towns had the opportunity to apply for the title of city. The request had to be based on historical facts such as having the title before the French occupation or during the Middle Ages or had to be based on the development of a high population in their urban centres. 44 towns were granted the title of city between 1982 and 1999.

== See also ==
- City rights in the Low Countries
- List of cities in Belgium
- List of cities in Flanders
- List of cities in Wallonia
