= Arrondissement of Ypres =

Arrondissement of Ypres Arrondissement Ieper
- Arrondissement
- Location of the arrondissement in West Flanders
- Coordinates: 50°51′N 02°55′E
- Country: Belgium
- Region: Flanders
- Province: West Flanders
- Municipalities: 8

Area
  - Total: 549.62 km^{2} (212.21 sq mi)

Population (1 January 2017)
  - Total: 106,230
  - Density: 193.28/km^{2} (500.59/sq mi)
- Time zone: UTC+1 (CET)
  - Summer (DST): UTC+2 (CEST)

The Arrondissement of Ypres (Dutch: Arrondissement Ieper; French: Arrondissement d'Ypres) is one of the eight administrative arrondissements in the Province of West Flanders, Belgium. It is both an administrative and a judicial arrondissement. However, the Judicial Arrondissement of Ypres also comprises the municipalities of Staden and Moorslede in the Arrondissement of Roeselare.

== Municipalities ==
The Administrative Arrondissement of Ypres consists of the following municipalities:

- Heuvelland
- Langemark-Poelkapelle
- Mesen
- Poperinge
- Vleteren
- Wervik
- Ypres
- Zonnebeke
