= Flanders =

Dutch-speaking region of Belgium

Flanders Vlaanderen
- Community and region
- Flag Coat of arms
- Anthem: De Vlaamse Leeuw ("The Flemish Lion")
- Coordinates: 51°00′N 4°30′E
- Country: Belgium
- County of Flanders: 862–1795
- Flemish Community: 1970
- Flemish Region: 1980
- Seat: City of Brussels

Government
  - Executive: Flemish Government
  - Governing parties (2024–2029): N-VA, Vooruit, CD&V
  - Minister-President: Matthias Diependaele (N-VA)
  - Legislature: Flemish Parliament
  - Speaker of the Flemish Parliament: Freya Van den Bossche (Vooruit)

Area
  - Total: 13,626 km^{2} (5,261 sq mi)

Population (1 January 2024)
  - Total: 6,821,770
  - Density: 501/km^{2} (1,300/sq mi)
  - Official language: Dutch
  - Other languages: Flemish Sign Language (Note: Recognized by the Flemish Community.); French (Note: Language facilities for French speakers in Drogenbos, Kraainem, Linkebeek, Sint-Genesius-Rode, Wemmel, Wezembeek-Oppem.); Brabantian; Limburgish; East Flemish; West Flemish
- Demonyms: Flemish; Fleming

GDP
  - Total: €367.496 billion (2024)
- Time zone: UTC+01:00 (CET)
  - Summer (DST): UTC+02:00 (CEST)
- ISO 3166 code: BE-VLG
- Website: vlaanderen.be
- The area and population figures are given for the Flemish Region, not the Community.

Flanders (/ˈflɑːndərz/ FLAHN-dərz or /ˈflændərz/ FLAN-dərz; Dutch: Vlaanderen [ˈvlaːndərə(n)]) (Note: French: Flandre [flɑ̃dʁ].) is the Dutch-speaking northern part of Belgium. However, there are several overlapping definitions, including ones related to culture, language, politics, and history, and sometimes involving neighbouring countries. The demonym associated with Flanders is Fleming, while the corresponding adjective is Flemish, which can also refer to the collective of Dutch dialects spoken in that area, or more generally the Belgian variant of Standard Dutch.

Most Flemings live within the Flemish Region (also often referred to as simply Flanders), which is a federal state within Belgium with its own elected government. However, like Belgium itself, the official capital of Flanders is the City of Brussels, which lies within the Brussels-Capital Region, rather than the Flemish Region, and the majority of residents there are French speaking. The powers of the Flemish Government in Brussels are limited mainly to Flemish culture and education.

Geographically, Flanders is mainly flat, and incorporates the whole coast of Belgium on the North Sea. It borders the French department of Nord to the south-west near the coast, the Dutch provinces of Zeeland, North Brabant and Limburg to the north and east, and the Walloon provinces of Hainaut, Walloon Brabant and Liège to the south. Despite accounting for only 45% of Belgium's territory, more than half the population lives there – 6,821,770 (or 58%) out of 11,763,650 Belgian inhabitants, as of January 2024. Much of Flanders is agriculturally fertile and densely populated at 501/km^{2} (1,300/sq mi). The Brussels Region is an officially bilingual enclave within the Flemish Region. (Note: Only about 8% of Brussels inhabitants identify as Flemish, while the rest identify as French-speaking or non-Belgian.) Flanders also has exclaves of its own: Voeren in the east is between Wallonia and the Netherlands and Baarle-Hertog in the north consists of 22 exclaves surrounded by the Netherlands. Not including Brussels, there are five present-day Flemish provinces: Antwerp, East Flanders, Flemish Brabant, Limburg and West Flanders. The official language is Dutch.

The area of today's Flanders has figured prominently in European history since the Middle Ages. The original County of Flanders stretched around AD 900 from the Strait of Dover to the Scheldt estuary and expanded from there. This county still corresponds roughly with the modern-day Belgian provinces of West Flanders and East Flanders, along with neighbouring parts of France and the Netherlands. (Note: Although this original meaning is still relevant, in modern times the term "Flanders" came to refer to a larger area, and is used to refer to the entire Dutch-speaking part of Belgium, stretching all the way to the Meuse, as well as cultural movements such as Flemish art.) In this period, cities such as Ghent and Bruges of the historic County of Flanders, and later Antwerp of the Duchy of Brabant made it one of the richest and most urbanised parts of Europe, trading, and weaving the wool of neighbouring lands into cloth for both domestic use and export. As a consequence, a very sophisticated culture developed, with impressive achievements in the arts and architecture, rivaling those of northern Italy.

Belgium was one of the centres of the 19th-century Industrial Revolution, but this occurred mainly in French-speaking Wallonia. In the second half of the 20th century, and due to massive national investments in port infrastructure, Flanders' economy modernised rapidly, and today Flanders and Brussels are much wealthier than Wallonia, being among the wealthiest regions in Europe and the world. In accordance with late 20th century Belgian state reforms, Flanders was made into two political entities: the Flemish Region (Dutch: Vlaams Gewest) and the Flemish Community (Dutch: Vlaamse Gemeenschap). These entities were merged, although geographically the Flemish Community, which has a broader cultural mandate, covers Brussels, whereas the Flemish Region does not.

== Terminology ==
=== Modern Belgium ===
The term "Flanders" has several main modern meanings:

- The "Flemish community", i.e. the social, cultural and linguistic, scientific and educational, economical and political community of the Flemings. For most purposes this is considered to include the 6.5 million Belgians (approximately 60%) who consider Dutch to be their mother tongue, including many people living in the Brussels-Capital Region.
- In the context of the political subdivisions of Belgium there are the Flemish Region (competent in mainly economic matters) and the Flemish Community (competent in mainly cultural matters). The first does not comprise Brussels (which forms a Region by itself), whereas the latter does comprise the Dutch-speaking inhabitants of Brussels.
- The political institutions that govern both subdivisions: the operative body or "Flemish Government", and the legislative organ or "Flemish Parliament".
- Within Belgian discussions, the two westernmost provinces of the Flemish Region, West Flanders and East Flanders, forming the central portion of the historic County of Flanders are also still collectively referred to as Flanders.

=== Historical ===
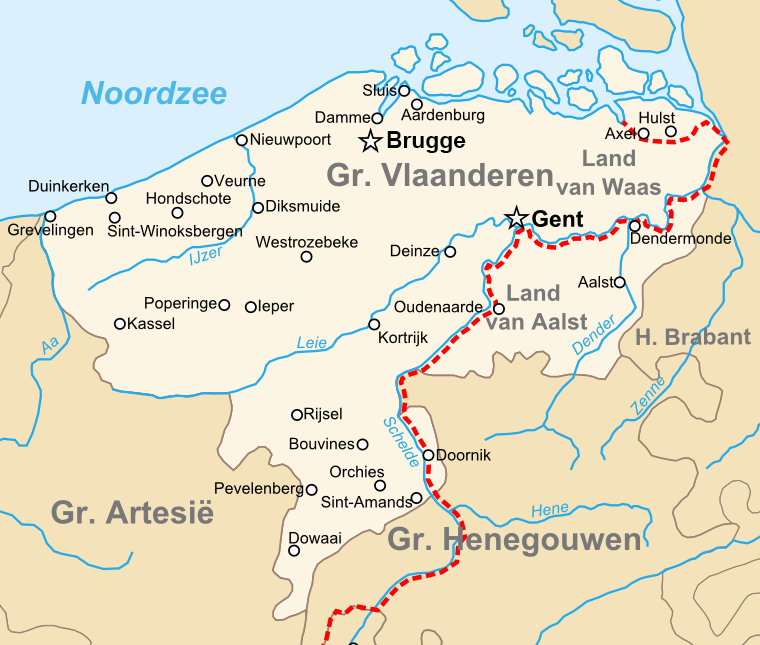
Topographic map of the County of Flanders at the end of the 14th century

The name originally applied to the ancien régime territory called the County of Flanders, that existed from the 8th century (Latin Flandria) until its absorption by the French First Republic. Until the 1600s, this county also extended over parts of what are now France and the Netherlands.

- In France, one of the historically Flemish regions is now in the Nord department. This is referred to as French Flanders, and can be divided into three smaller regions: Walloon Flanders, Maritime Flanders, and Artesian Flanders. The first region was predominantly French-speaking already in the 1600s, the latter became so in the 20th century. The city of Lille identifies itself as "Flemish", and this is reflected, for instance, in the name of its local railway station Lille Flandres.
- The historically Flemish region which became part of the Dutch Republic, now part of the Dutch province of Zeeland, called Zeelandic Flanders.

However, the term came to be used for a bigger territory, and this is critical to the evolution of modern terminology. Once the Counts of Flanders (who were also Dukes of Burgundy) expanded their regional power to create the bigger entity, now referred to by historians as the Burgundian Netherlands, "Flanders", along with Latin "Belgium", were the first two common names to describe this regional block. With the breakaway of the northern Netherlands in the early modern period, the term Flanders continued to be associated with the whole southern part of the Low Countries—the Southern, Spanish or Austrian Netherlands, which were the successors of the Burgundian state, and also predecessors of modern Belgium. The restriction of the term Flanders to the Germanic speaking part of the population occurred later.

In the history of art and other fields, the adjectives Flemish and Netherlandish are commonly used to designate all the artistic production in this area before about 1580, after which it refers specifically to the southern Netherlands. For example, the term "Flemish Primitives", now outdated in English but used in French, Dutch and other languages, is a synonym for "Early Netherlandish painting", and it is not uncommon to see Mosan art categorized as Flemish art. In music the Franco-Flemish School is also known as the Dutch School.

=== Dutch-speaking part of Belgium ===
The term "Flemish" came to be a term for the language Dutch, and during the 19th and 20th centuries, it became increasingly common to refer exclusively to the Dutch-speaking part of Belgium as "Flanders". Belgium divided itself into official French- and Dutch-speaking parts starting in the early 1960s. Today Flanders extends over the northern part of Belgium, including not only the Dutch-speaking Belgian parts of the medieval Duchy of Brabant, which was united with Flanders since the Middle Ages, but also Belgian Limburg, which corresponds closely to the medieval County of Loon, and was never under Burgundian control.

The ambiguity between this wider cultural area and that of the county or province still remains in discussions about the region. In most present-day contexts however, the term Flanders is taken to refer to either the political, social, cultural, and linguistic community (and the corresponding official institution, the Flemish Community), or the geographical area, one of the three institutional regions in Belgium, namely the Flemish Region.

Within this Dutch-speaking part of Belgium, French has never ceased to be spoken by some citizens, and Jewish groups have been speaking Yiddish in Antwerp for centuries. Regardless of nationality or linguistic background, according to Belgian Law education in schools located in the Flemish Region must be mainly in the Dutch language. In Brussels, teaching is also done in French.

== History ==
=== Early history ===
When Julius Caesar conquered the area he described it as the less economically developed and more warlike part of Gallia Belgica. His informants told him that especially in the east, the tribes claimed ancestral connections and kinship with the "Germanic" peoples then east of the Rhine. Under the Roman Empire the whole of Gallia Belgica became an administrative province. The future counties of Flanders and Brabant remained part of this province connected to what is now France, but in the east modern Limburg became part of the Rhine frontier province of Germania Inferior connected to what is now the Netherlands and Germany. Gallia Belgica and Germania Inferior were the two most northerly continental provinces of the Roman Empire.

In the future county of Flanders, the main Belgic tribe in early Roman times was the Menapii, but also on the coast were the Marsacii and Morini. In the central part of modern Belgium were the Nervii, whose territory corresponded to medieval Brabant as well as French-speaking Hainaut. In the east was the large district of the Tungri which covered both French- and Dutch-speaking parts of eastern Belgium. The Tungri were understood to have links to Germanic tribes east of the Rhine. Another notable group were the Toxandrians who appear to have lived in the Kempen region, in the northern parts of both the Nervian and Tungrian districts, probably stretching into the modern Netherlands. The Roman administrative districts (civitates) of the Menapii, Nervii and Tungri therefore corresponded roughly with the medieval counties of Flanders, Brabant and Loon, and the modern Flemish provinces of East and West Flanders (Menapii), Brabant and Antwerp (the northern Nervii), and Belgian Limburg (part of the Tungri). Brabant appears to have been separated from the Tungri by a relatively unpopulated forest area, the Silva Carbonaria, forming a natural boundary between northeast and southwest Belgium.

In the coastal and Scheldt areas, Saxon tribes gradually appeared. For the Romans, Saxon was a general term that included Angles, Saxons, Jutes and Erules. The coastal defense around Boulogne and Oudenburg, the Litus Saxonicum, remained functional until about 420. These forts were manned by Saxon soldiers.

Linguistically, the tribes in this area were under Celtic influence in the south, and Germanic influence in the east, but there is disagreement about what languages were spoken locally (apart from Vulgar Latin), and there may even have been an intermediate "Nordwestblock" language related to both. By the first century AD, Germanic languages appear to have become prevalent in the area of the Tungri.

As Roman influence waned, Frankish populations settled in the Tungiran area east of the Silva Carbonaria, and eventually pushed through it under Chlodio. They had kings in each Roman district (civitas). In the meantime, the Franks contributed to the Roman military. The first Merovingian king Childeric I was king of the Franks within the military of Gaul. He became leader of the administration of Belgica Secunda, which included the civitas of the Menapii (the future county of Flanders). From there, his son Clovis I managed to conquer both the Roman populations of northern France and the Frankish populations beyond the forest areas.

The abandoned coast and Scheldt region had been partially repopulated since the 4th century by Saxons and Franks from the east of the Rhine, who retained their Germanic culture and language. In the 5th century, Salic Franks settled in present-day Northern-France and Wallonia, primarily around the cities of Courtrai, Tournai and Bavay. They adapted to the local Gallo-Romanic population. From the 6th century on, the no-mans-land farther north was filled by Franks from the Rhinelands and other Germanic groups from the Netherlands and Germany.

=== Historical Flanders ===
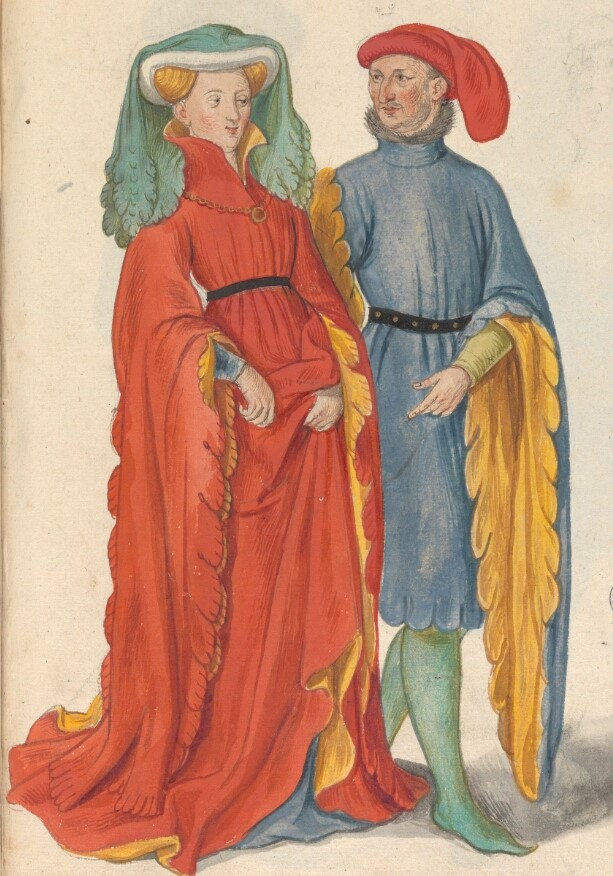
A Flemish lady and gentleman in the year 1400, illustrated in the manuscript "Théâtre de tous les peuples et nations de la terre avec leurs habits et ornemens divers, tant anciens que modernes, diligemment depeints au naturel". Painted by Lucas d'Heere in the 2nd half of the 16th century. Preserved in the Ghent University Library.

The County of Flanders was a feudal fief in West Francia. The first certain Count in the comital family, Baldwin I of Flanders, is first reported in a document of 862, when he eloped with a daughter of his king Charles the Bald. The region developed as a medieval economic power with a large degree of political autonomy. While its trading cities remained strong, it was weakened and divided when districts fell under direct French royal rule in the late 12th century. The remaining parts of Flanders came under the rule of the counts of neighbouring imperial Hainaut under Baldwin V of Hainaut in 1191.

During the late Middle Ages, Flanders's trading towns (notably Ghent, Bruges and Ypres) made it one of the richest and most urbanized parts of Europe, weaving the wool of neighbouring lands into cloth for both domestic use and export. As a consequence, a sophisticated culture developed, with impressive art and architecture, rivalling those of northern Italy. Ghent, Bruges, Ypres and the Franc of Bruges formed the Four Members, a form of parliament that exercised considerable power in Flanders.

Increasingly powerful from the 12th century, the territory's autonomous urban communes were instrumental in defeating a French attempt at annexation (1300–1302), finally defeating the French in the Battle of the Golden Spurs (11 July 1302), near Kortrijk. Two years later, the uprising was defeated and Flanders indirectly remained part of the French Crown. Flemish prosperity waned in the following century, due to widespread European population decline following the Black Death of 1348, the disruption of trade during the Anglo-French Hundred Years' War (1337–1453), and increased English cloth production. Flemish weavers had gone over to Worstead and North Walsham in Norfolk in the 12th century and established the woolen industry.

The County of Flanders started to take control of the neighbouring County of Brabant during the life of Louis II, Count of Flanders (1330–1384), who fought his sister-in-law Joanna, Duchess of Brabant for control of it.

The entire area, straddling the ancient boundary of France and the Holy Roman Empire, later passed to Philip the Bold in 1384, the Duke of Burgundy, with his capital in Brussels. The titles were eventually more clearly united under his grandson Philip the Good (1396 – 1467). This large Duchy passed in 1477 to the Habsburg dynasty, and in 1556 to the kings of Spain. Western and southern districts of Flanders were confirmed under French rule under successive treaties of 1659 (Artois), 1668 and 1678.

The County of Loon, approximately the modern Flemish province of Limburg, remained independent of France, forming a part of the Prince-Bishopric of Liège until the French Revolution, but surrounded by the Burgundians, and under their influence.

=== Low Countries ===
==== Beeldenstorm ====
In 1500, Charles V was born in Ghent. He inherited the Seventeen Provinces (1506), Spain (1516) with its colonies and in 1519 was elected Holy Roman Emperor. Charles V issued the Pragmatic Sanction of 1549, which established the Low Countries as the Seventeen Provinces (or Spanish Netherlands in its broad sense) as an entity separate from the Holy Roman Empire and from France. In 1556 Charles V abdicated due to ill health (he suffered from crippling gout). Spain and the Seventeen Provinces went to his son, Philip II of Spain.

Over the first half of the 16th century Antwerp grew to become the second-largest European city north of the Alps by 1560. Antwerp was the richest city in Europe at this time. According to Luc-Normand Tellier "It is estimated that the port of Antwerp was earning the Spanish crown seven times more revenues than the Americas."

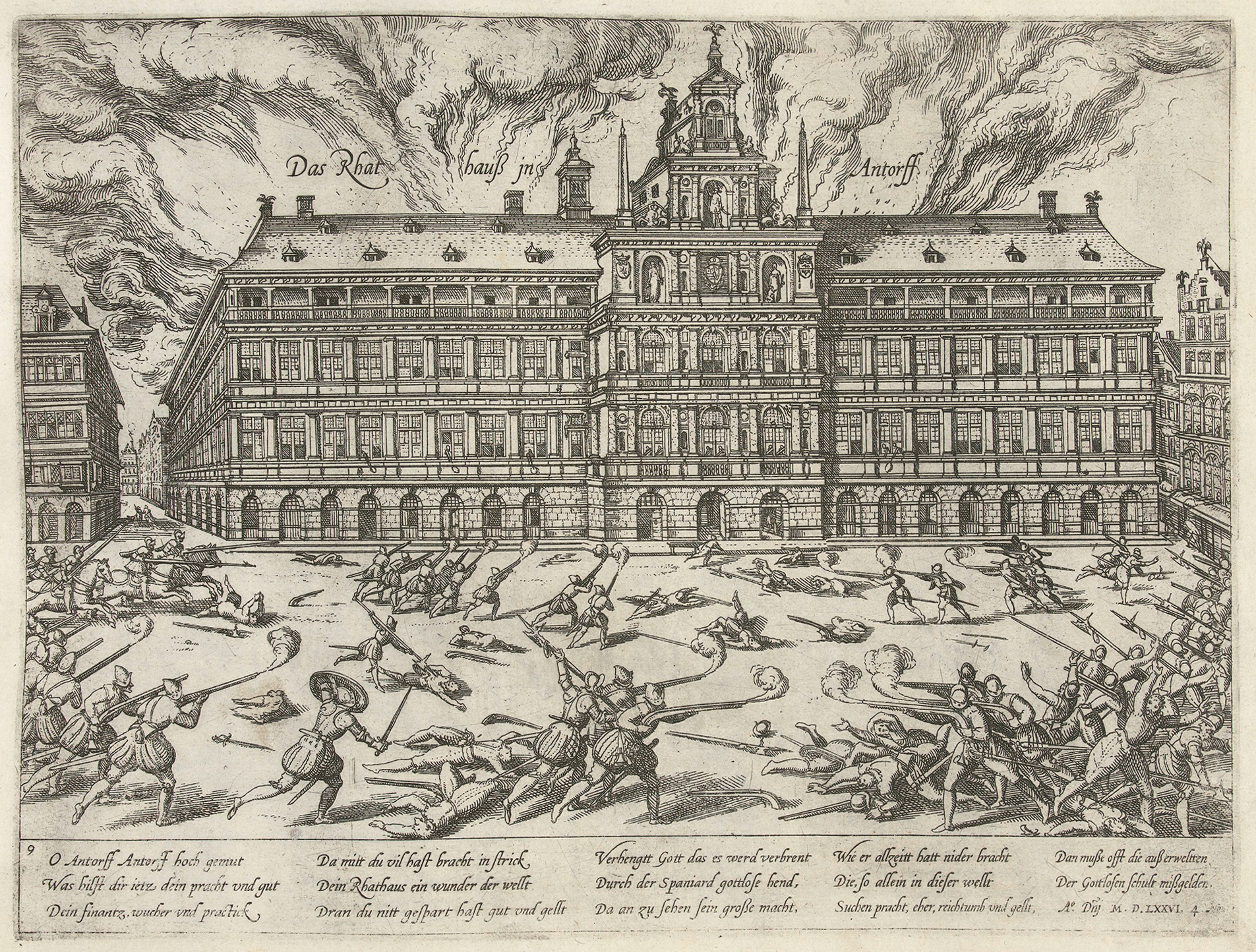
The Sack of Antwerp in 1576, in which about 7,000 people died

Meanwhile, Protestantism had reached the Low Countries. Among the wealthy traders of Antwerp, the Lutheran beliefs of the German Hanseatic traders found appeal, perhaps partly for economic reasons. The spread of Protestantism in this city was aided by the presence of an Augustinian cloister (founded 1514) in the St. Andries quarter. Luther, an Augustinian himself, had taught some of the monks, and his works were in print by 1518. The first Lutheran martyrs came from Antwerp. The Reformation resulted in consecutive but overlapping waves of reform: a Lutheran, followed by a militant Anabaptist, then a Mennonite, and finally a Calvinistic movement. These movements existed independently of each other.

Philip II, a devout Catholic and self-proclaimed protector of the Counter-Reformation, suppressed Calvinism in Flanders, Brabant and Holland (what is now approximately Belgian Limburg was part of the Prince-Bishopric of Liège and was Catholic de facto). In 1566, the wave of iconoclasm known as the Beeldenstorm was a prelude to religious war between Catholics and Protestants, especially the Anabaptists. The Beeldenstorm started in what is now French Flanders, with open-air sermons (Dutch: hagepreken) that spread through the Low Countries, first to Antwerp and Ghent, and from there further east and north.

==== The Eighty Years' War and its consequences ====
Subsequently, Philip II of Spain sent the Duke of Alba to the Provinces to repress the revolt. Alba recaptured the southern part of the Provinces, who signed the Union of Atrecht, which meant that they would accept the Spanish government on condition of more freedom. But the northern part of the provinces signed the Union of Utrecht and settled in 1581 the Republic of the Seven United Netherlands. Spanish troops quickly started fighting the rebels, and the Spanish armies conquered the important trading cities of Bruges and Ghent. Antwerp, which was then the most important port in the world, also had to be conquered. But before the revolt was defeated, a war between Spain and England broke out, forcing Spanish troops to halt their advance. On 17 August 1585, Antwerp fell. This ended the Eighty Years' War for the (from now on) Southern Netherlands. The United Provinces (the Northern Netherlands) fought on until 1648 – the Peace of Westphalia.

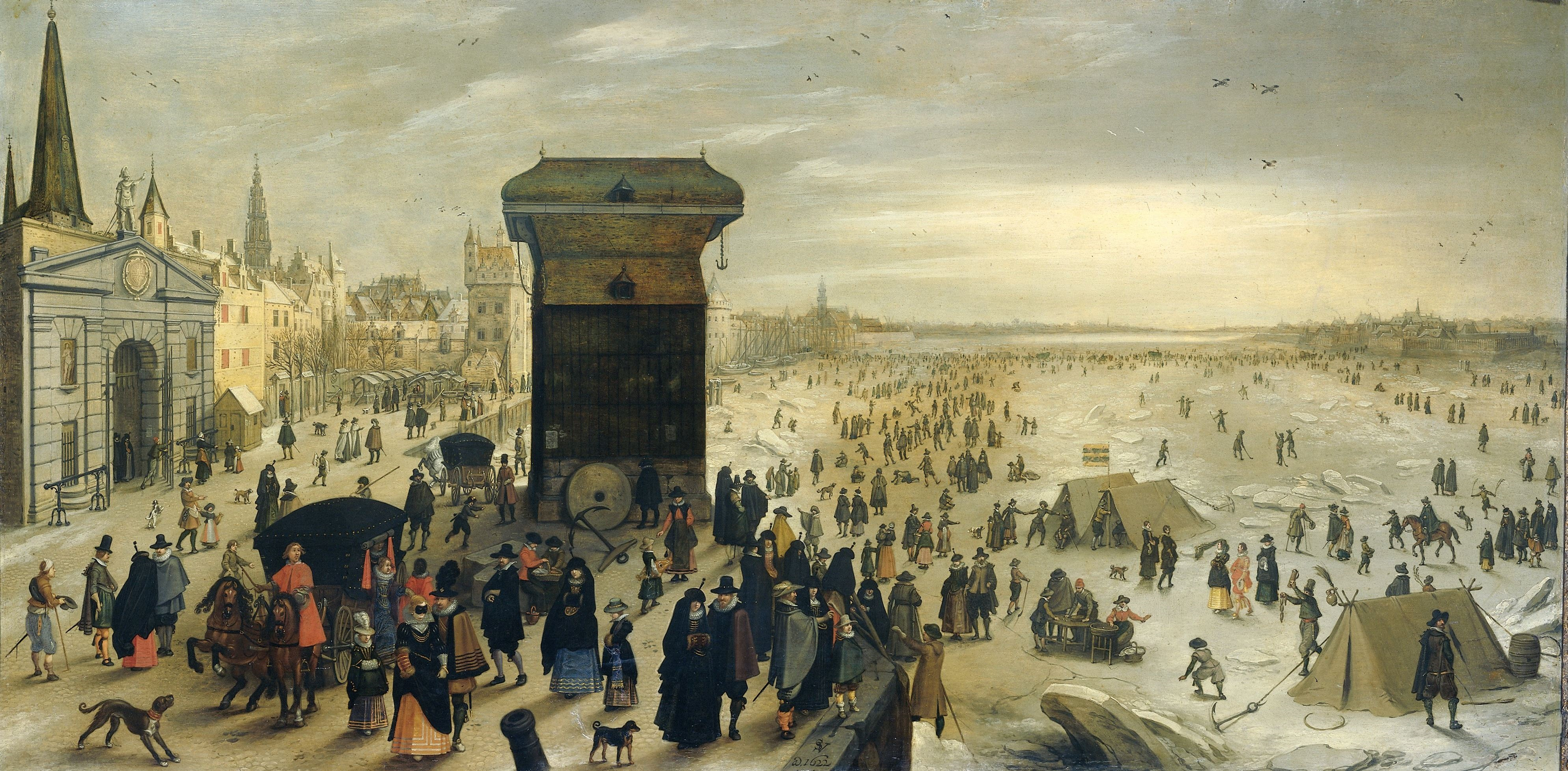
Winter scene at the Scheldt river in Antwerp by Sebastian Vrancx, 1622

During the war with England, the rebels from the north, strengthened by refugees from the south, started a campaign to reclaim areas lost to Philip II's Spanish troops. They conquered a considerable part of Brabant (the later North Brabant of the Netherlands), and the south bank of the Scheldt estuary (Zeelandic Flanders), before being stopped by Spanish troops. The front at the end of this war stabilized and became the border between present-day Belgium and the Netherlands. The Dutch (as they later became known) had managed to reclaim enough of Spanish-controlled Flanders to close off the river Scheldt, effectively cutting Antwerp off from its trade routes.

The fall of Antwerp to the Spanish and the closing of the Scheldt caused considerable emigration. (Note: An Antverpian, derived from Antverpia, the Latin name of Antwerp, is an inhabitant of this city; the term is also the adjective expressing that its substantive is from or in that city or belongs to it.) Many Calvinist merchants of Antwerp and other Flemish cities left Flanders and migrated north. Many of them settled in Amsterdam, which was a smaller port, important only in the Baltic trade. The Flemish exiles helped to rapidly transform Amsterdam into one of the world's most important ports. This is why the exodus is sometimes described as "creating a new Antwerp".

Flanders and Brabant, went into a period of relative decline from the time of the Thirty Years' War. In the Northern Netherlands, the mass emigration from Flanders and Brabant became an important driving force behind the Dutch Golden Age.

==== Southern Netherlands (1581–1795) ====
1584 map of the county of Flanders

Although arts remained relatively impressive for another century with Peter Paul Rubens (1577–1640) and Anthony van Dyck, Flanders lost its former economic and intellectual power under Spanish, Austrian, and French rule. Heavy taxation and rigid imperial political control compounded the effects of industrial stagnation and Spanish-Dutch and Franco-Austrian conflict. The Southern Netherlands suffered severely under the Franco-Dutch War, Nine Years' War and War of the Spanish Succession. But under the reign of Empress Maria-Theresia, these lands again flourished economically. Influenced by the Enlightenment, the Austrian Emperor Joseph II was the first sovereign who had been in the Southern Netherlands since King Philip II of Spain left them in 1559.

==== French Revolution and Napoleonic France (1795–1815) ====
In 1794, the French Republican Army started using Antwerp as the northernmost naval port of France. The following year, France officially annexed Flanders as the départements of Lys, Escaut, Deux-Nèthes, Meuse-Inférieure and Dyle. Obligatory (French) army service for all men aged 16–25 years was a main reason for the uprising against the French in 1798, known as the Boerenkrijg (Peasants' War), with the heaviest fighting in the Campine area.

==== United Kingdom of the Netherlands (1815–1830) ====
After the defeat of Napoleon Bonaparte at the 1815 Battle of Waterloo in Brabant, the Congress of Vienna (1815) gave sovereignty over the Austrian Netherlands – Belgium minus the East Cantons and Luxembourg – to the United Netherlands (Dutch: Verenigde Nederlanden) under Prince William I of Orange Nassau, making him William I of the United Kingdom of the Netherlands. William I started rapid industrialisation of the southern parts of the Kingdom. But the political system failed to forge a true union between the north and south. Most of the southern bourgeoisie was Roman Catholic and French-speaking, while the north was mainly Protestant and Dutch-speaking.

In 1815, the Dutch Senate was reinstated (Dutch: Eerste Kamer der Staaten Generaal). The nobility, mainly coming from the south, became increasingly estranged from their northern colleagues. Resentment grew between the Roman Catholics from the south and the Protestants from the north, and also between the powerful liberal bourgeoisie from the south and their more moderate colleagues from the north. On 25 August 1830 (after the showing of the opera 'La Muette de Portici' of Daniel Auber in Brussels) the Belgian Revolution sparked. On 4 October 1830, the Provisional Government (Dutch: Voorlopig Bewind) proclaimed its independence, which was later confirmed by the National Congress that issued a new Liberal Constitution and declared the new state a Constitutional Monarchy, under the House of Saxe-Coburg. Flanders now became part of the Kingdom of Belgium, which was recognized by the major European Powers on 20 January 1831. The cessation was recognized by the United Kingdom of the Netherlands on 19 April 1839.

=== Kingdom of Belgium ===
In 1830, the Belgian Revolution led to the splitting up of the two countries. Belgium was confirmed as an independent state by the Treaty of London of 1839, but deprived of the eastern half of Limburg (now Dutch Limburg), and the Eastern half of Luxembourg (now the Grand-Duchy of Luxembourg). Sovereignty over Zeelandic Flanders, south of the Westerscheldt river delta, was left with the Kingdom of the Netherlands, which was allowed to levy a toll on all traffic to Antwerp harbour until 1863.

==== Rise of the Flemish Movement ====
In 1873, Dutch became an official language in public secondary schools. In 1898, Dutch and French were declared equal languages in laws and Royal orders. In 1930, the first Flemish university was opened.

The first official translation of the Belgian constitution in Dutch was not published until 1967.

==== World War I and its consequences ====
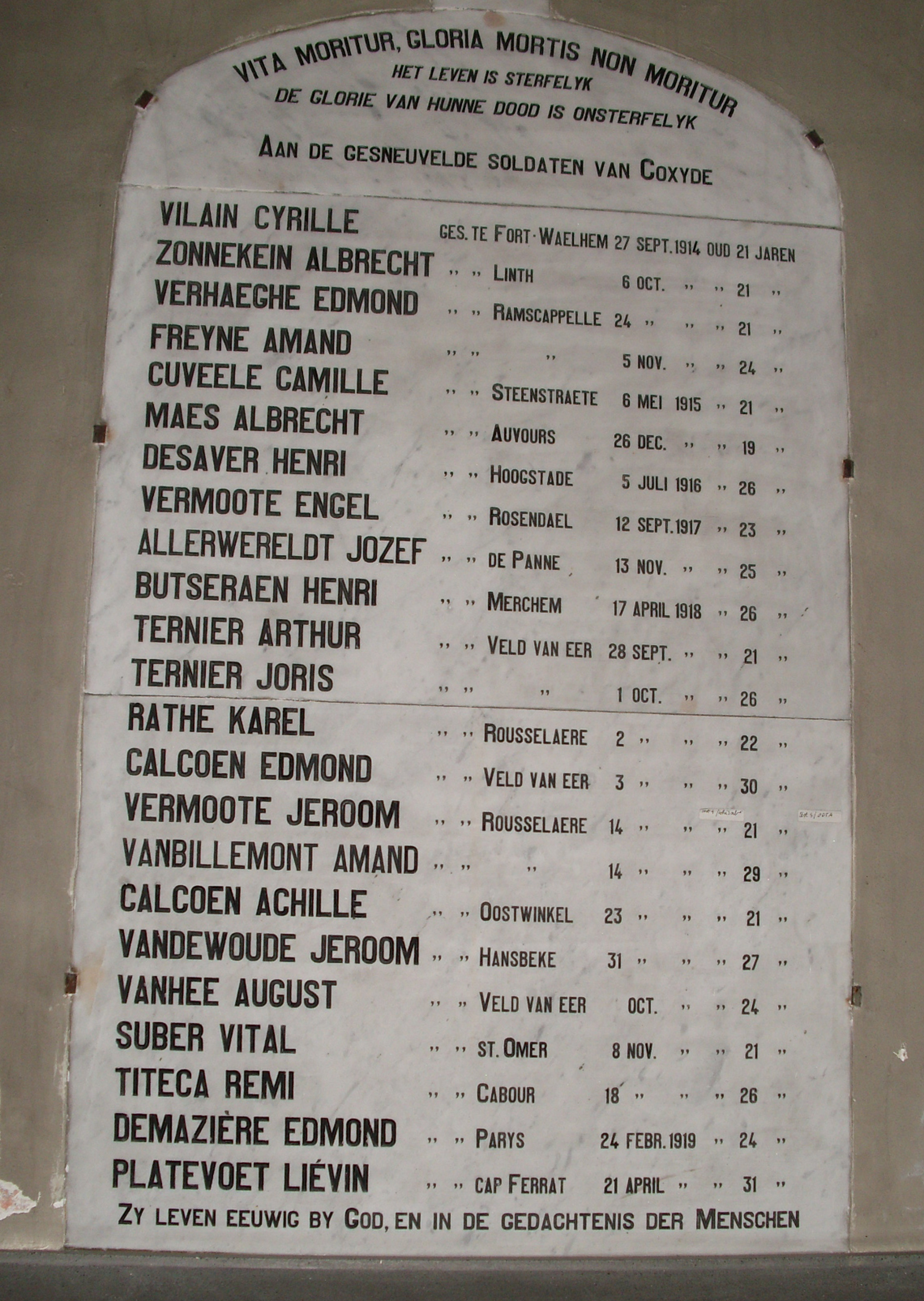
Koksijde, a memorial to soldiers killed in World War I

Flanders (and Belgium as a whole) saw some of the greatest loss of life on the Western Front of the First World War, in particular from the three battles of Ypres.

The war strengthened Flemish identity and consciousness. The occupying German authorities took several Flemish-friendly measures. The resulting suffering of the war is remembered by Flemish organizations during the yearly Yser pilgrimage in Diksmuide at the monument of the Yser Tower.

==== Right-wing nationalism in the interbellum and World War II ====
During the interbellum and World War II, several right-wing fascist and/or national-socialistic parties emerged in Belgium. Since these parties were promised more rights for the Flemings by the German government during World War II, many of them collaborated with the Nazi regime. After the war, collaborators (or people who were Zwart, "Black" during the war) were prosecuted and punished, among them many Flemish nationalists whose main political goal had been the emancipation of Flanders. As a result, until today Flemish nationalism is often associated with right-wing politics. Flemish nationalism is however a direct consequence of the events of the years prior to the first World War, in which many were oppressed by the French speaking majority. This ultimately gave way to a rising feeling of cultural autonomy and even a sense of a nationalism.

==== Flemish autonomy ====
After World War II, the differences between Dutch-speaking and French-speaking Belgians became clear in a number of conflicts, such as the Royal Question, the question whether King Leopold III should return (which most Flemings supported but Walloons did not) and the use of Dutch in the Catholic University of Leuven. As a result, several state reforms took place in the second half of the 20th century, which transformed the unitary Belgium into a federal state with communities, regions and language areas. This resulted also in the establishment of a Flemish Parliament and Government. During the 1970s, all major political parties split into a Dutch and French-speaking party.

Several Flemish parties still advocate for more Flemish autonomy, some even for Flemish independence (see Partition of Belgium), whereas the French-speakers would like to keep the current state as it is. Recent governments (such as Verhofstadt I Government) have transferred certain federal competences to the regional governments.

On 13 December 2006, a spoof news broadcast by the Belgian Francophone public broadcasting station RTBF announced that Flanders had decided to declare independence from Belgium.

The 2007 federal elections showed more support for Flemish autonomy, marking the start of the 2007–2011 Belgian political crisis. All the political parties that advocated a significant increase of Flemish autonomy gained votes as well as seats in the Belgian federal parliament. This was especially the case for Christian Democratic and Flemish and New Flemish Alliance (N-VA) (who had participated on a shared electoral list). The trend continued during the 2009 regional elections, where CD&V and N-VA were the clear winners in Flanders, and N-VA became even the largest party in Flanders and Belgium during the 2010 federal elections, followed by the longest-ever government formation after which the Di Rupo I Government was formed excluding N-VA. Eight parties agreed on a sixth state reform which aim to solve the disputes between Flemings and French-speakers. However, the 2012 provincial and municipal elections continued the trend of N-VA becoming the biggest party in Flanders.

However, sociological studies show no parallel between the rise of nationalist parties and popular support for their agenda. Instead, a recent study revealed a majority in favour of returning regional competences to the federal level.

== Government and politics ==
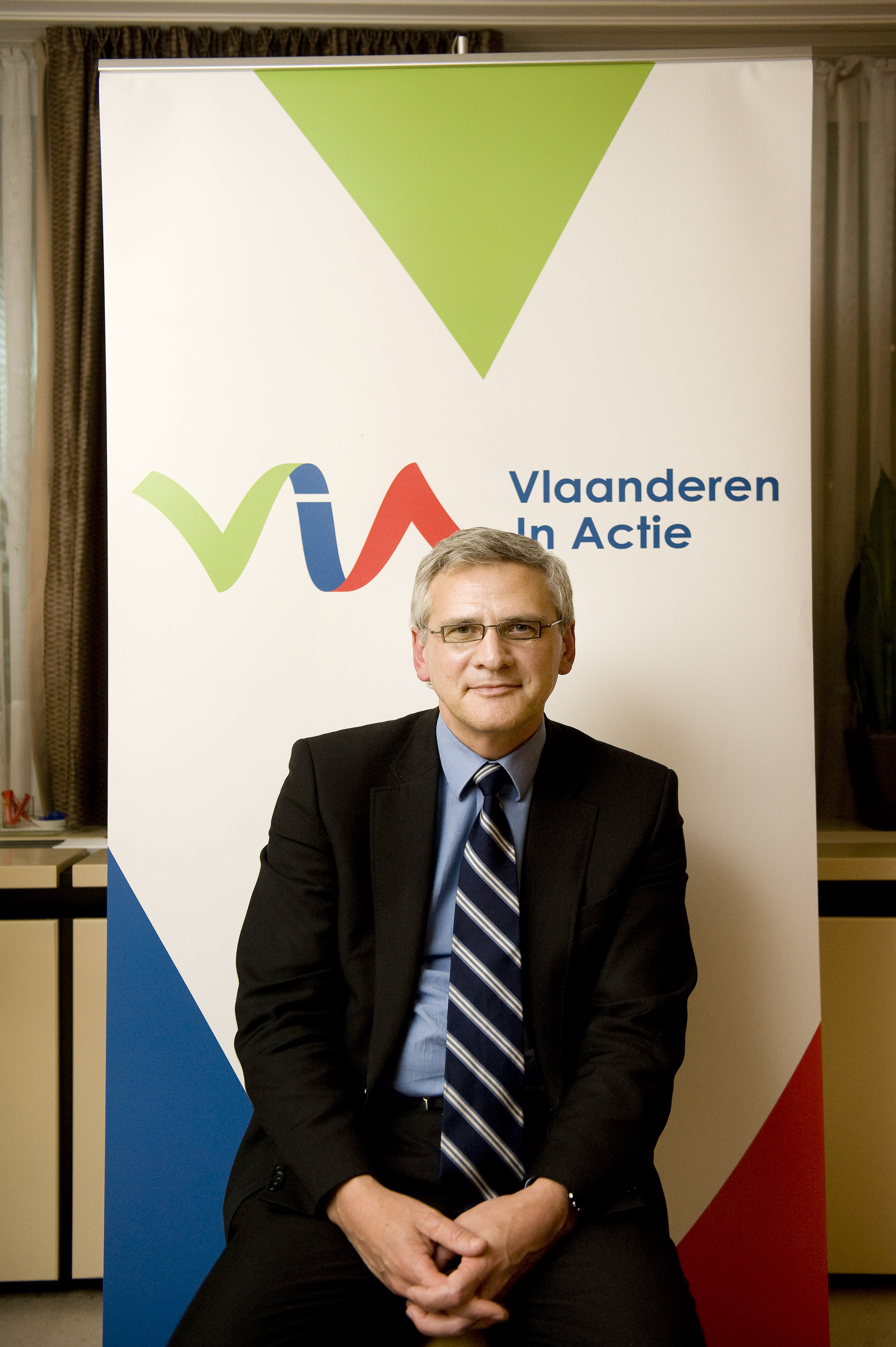
Kris Peeters, former Minister-President of Flanders, promoting Flanders in Action

Both the Flemish Community and the Flemish Region are constitutional institutions of the Kingdom of Belgium, exercising certain powers within their jurisdiction, granted following a series of state reforms. In practice, the Flemish Community and Region together form a single body, with its own parliament and government, as the Community legally absorbed the competences of the Region. The parliament is a directly elected legislative body composed of 124 representatives. The government consists of up to 11 members and is presided by a Minister-President, currently Geert Bourgeois (New Flemish Alliance) leading a coalition of his party (N-VA) with Christen-Democratisch en Vlaams (CD&V) and Open Vlaamse Liberalen en Democraten (Open VLD).

The area of the Flemish Community is represented on the maps above, including the area of the Brussels-Capital Region (hatched on the relevant map). Roughly, the Flemish Community exercises competences originally oriented towards the individuals of the Community's language: culture (including audiovisual media), education, and the use of the language. Extensions to personal matters less directly associated with language comprise sports, health policy (curative and preventive medicine), and assistance to individuals (protection of youth, social welfare, aid to families, immigrant assistance services, etc.)

The area of the Flemish Region is represented on the maps above. It has a population of more than 6 million (excluding the Dutch-speaking community in the Brussels Region, grey on the map for it is not a part of the Flemish Region). Roughly, the Flemish Region is responsible for territorial issues in a broad sense, including economy, employment, agriculture, water policy, housing, public works, energy, transport, the environment, town and country planning, nature conservation, credit, and foreign trade. It supervises the provinces, municipalities, and intercommunal utility companies.

The number of Dutch-speaking Flemish people in the Capital Region is estimated to be between 11% and 15% (official figures do not exist as there is no language census and no official subnationality). According to a survey conducted by the University of Louvain (UCLouvain) in Louvain-la-Neuve and published in June 2006, 51% of respondents from Brussels claimed to be bilingual, even if they do not have Dutch as their first language. They are governed by the Brussels Region for economics affairs and by the Flemish Community for educational and cultural issues.

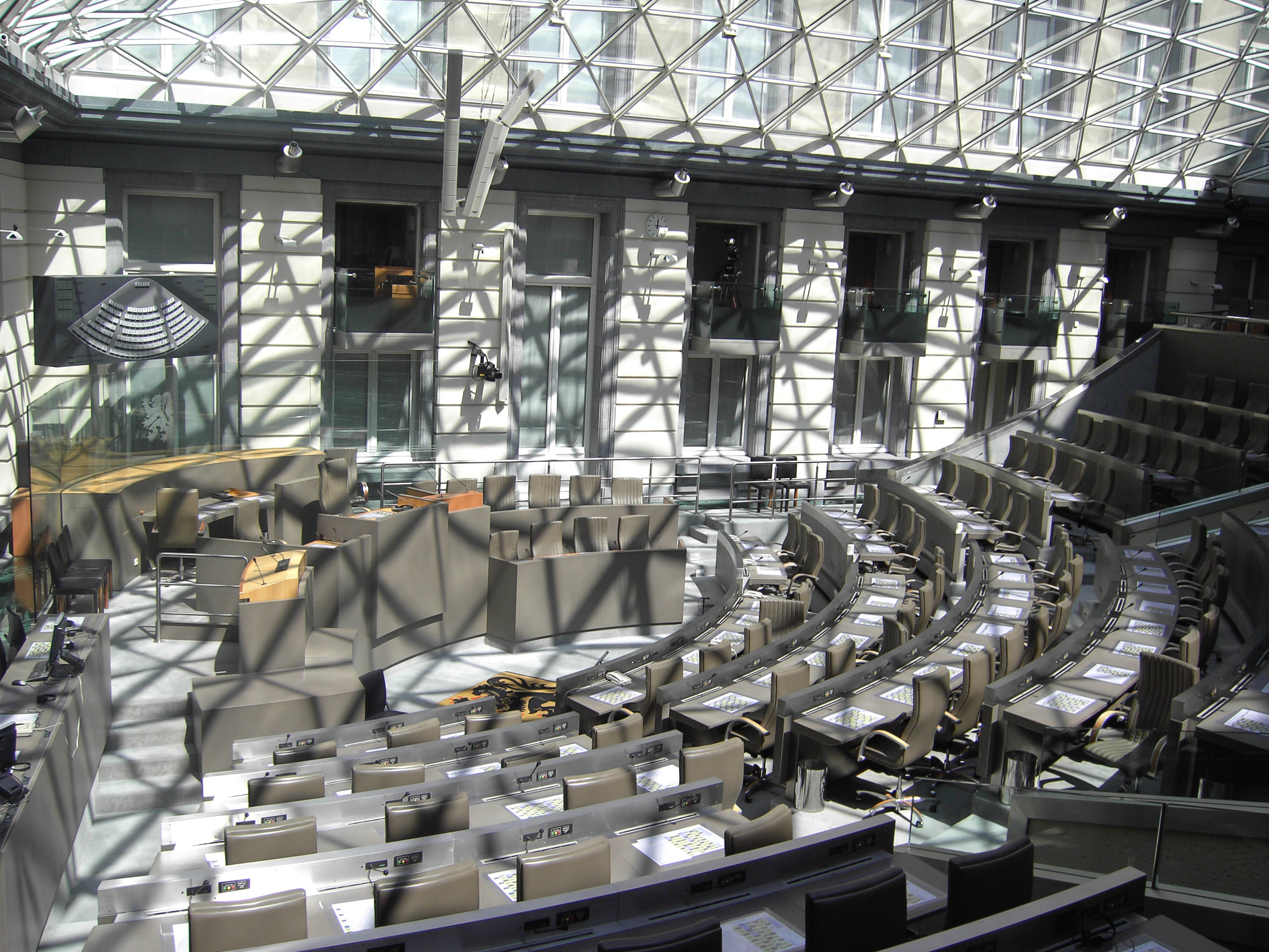
The Flemish Parliament

As mentioned above, Flemish institutions such as the Flemish Parliament and Government, represent the Flemish Community and the Flemish Region. The region and the community thus de facto share the same parliament and the same government. All these institutions are based in Brussels. Nevertheless, both types of subdivisions (the Community and the Region) still exist legally and the distinction between both is important for the people living in Brussels. Members of the Flemish Parliament who were elected in the Brussels Region cannot vote on affairs belonging to the competences of the Flemish Region.

The official language for all Flemish institutions is Dutch. French enjoys a limited official recognition in a dozen municipalities along the borders with French-speaking Wallonia, and a large recognition in the bilingual Brussels Region. French is widely known in Flanders, with 59% claiming to know French according to a survey conducted by UCLouvain in Louvain-la-Neuve and published in June 2006.

=== Politics ===
Historically, the political parties reflected the pillarisation (verzuiling) in Flemish society. The traditional political parties of the three pillars are Christian-Democratic and Flemish (CD&V), the Open Flemish Liberals and Democrats (Open Vld) and the Socialist Party – Differently (sp.a).

However, during the last half century, many new political parties were founded in Flanders. One of the first was the nationalist People's Union, of which the right nationalist Flemish Block (now Flemish Interest) split off, and which later dissolved into the now-defunct Spirit or Social Liberal Party, moderate nationalism rather left of the spectrum, on the one hand, and the New Flemish Alliance (N-VA), more conservative but independentist, on the other hand. Other parties are the leftist alternative/ecological Green party; the short-lived anarchistic libertarian spark ROSSEM and more recently the conservative-right liberal List Dedecker, founded by Jean-Marie Dedecker, and the socialist Workers' Party.

Particularly the Flemish Block/Flemish Interest has seen electoral success roughly around the turn of the century, and the New Flemish Alliance during the last few elections, even becoming the largest party in the 2010 federal elections.

=== Flemish independence ===
2011 survey by Het Nieuwsblad and Koppen on whether Flemings feel proud of their Belgian nationality.
1. Very proud (20.0%)
2. Proud (53.0%)
3. Not proud (18.0%)
4. Very not proud (8.00%)
5. No opinion (1.00%)

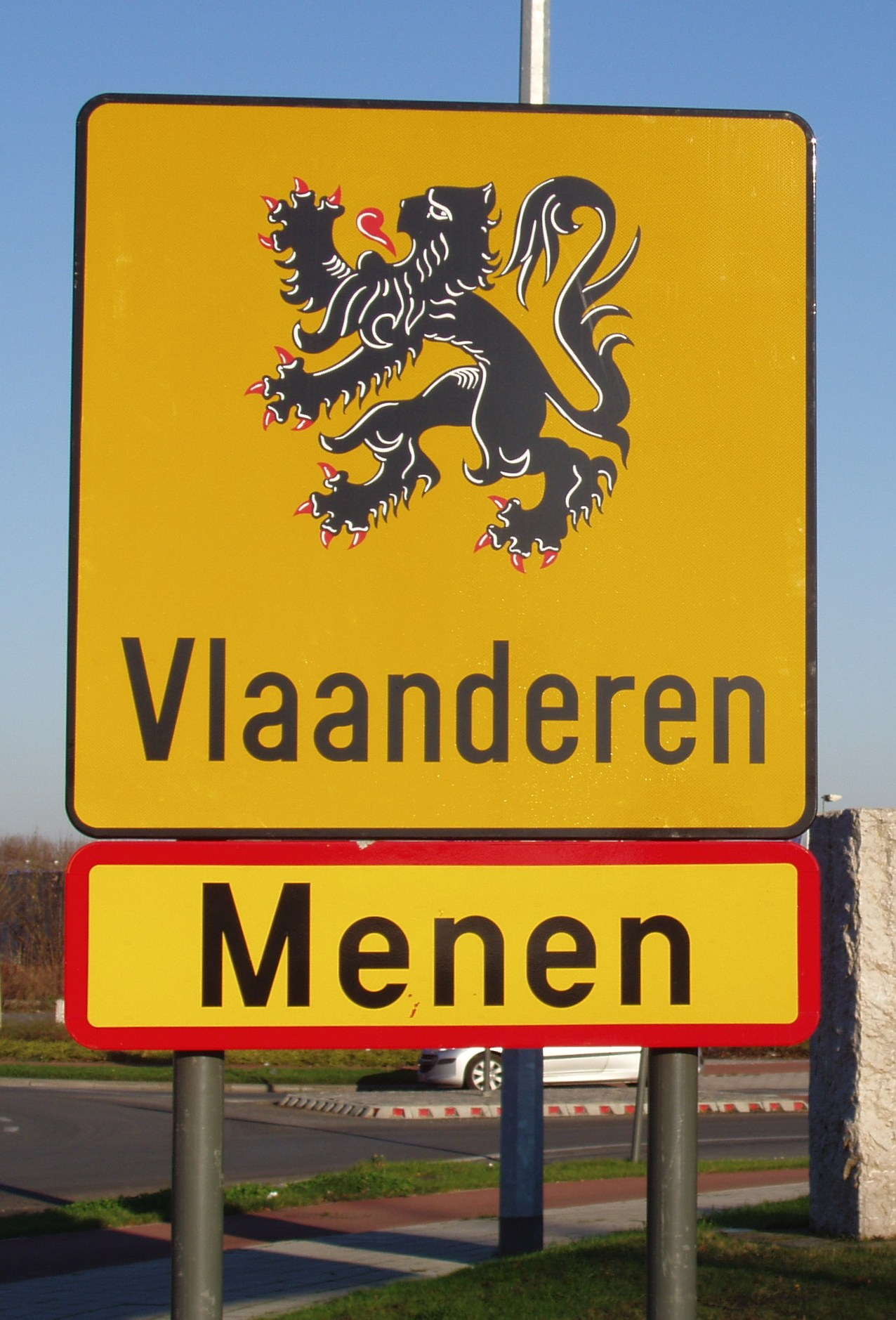
Border crossing sign near Menen.

For some inhabitants, Flanders is more than just a geographical area or the federal institutions (Flemish Community and Region). Supporters of the Flemish Movement even call it a nation and pursue Flemish independence, but most people (approximately 75%) living in Flanders say they are proud to be Belgian and opposed to the dissolution of Belgium. 20% is even very proud, while some 25% are not proud and 8% is very not proud. Mostly students claim to be proud of their nationality, with 90% of them saying so. Of the people older than 55, 31% claim to be proud of being a Belgian. Particular opposition to secession comes from women, people employed in services, the highest social classes and people from big families. Strongest of all opposing the notion are housekeepers—both housewives and house husbands.

In 2012, the Flemish government drafted a "Charter for Flanders" (Handvest voor Vlaanderen) of which the first article says "Vlaanderen is een deelstaat van de federale Staat België en maakt deel uit van de Europese Unie." ("Flanders is a component state of the federal State of Belgium and is part of the European Union"). In 2025, Prime Minister De Wever expressed his desire to reunite with The Netherlands, calling the Belgian separation "a disaster".

== Geography ==
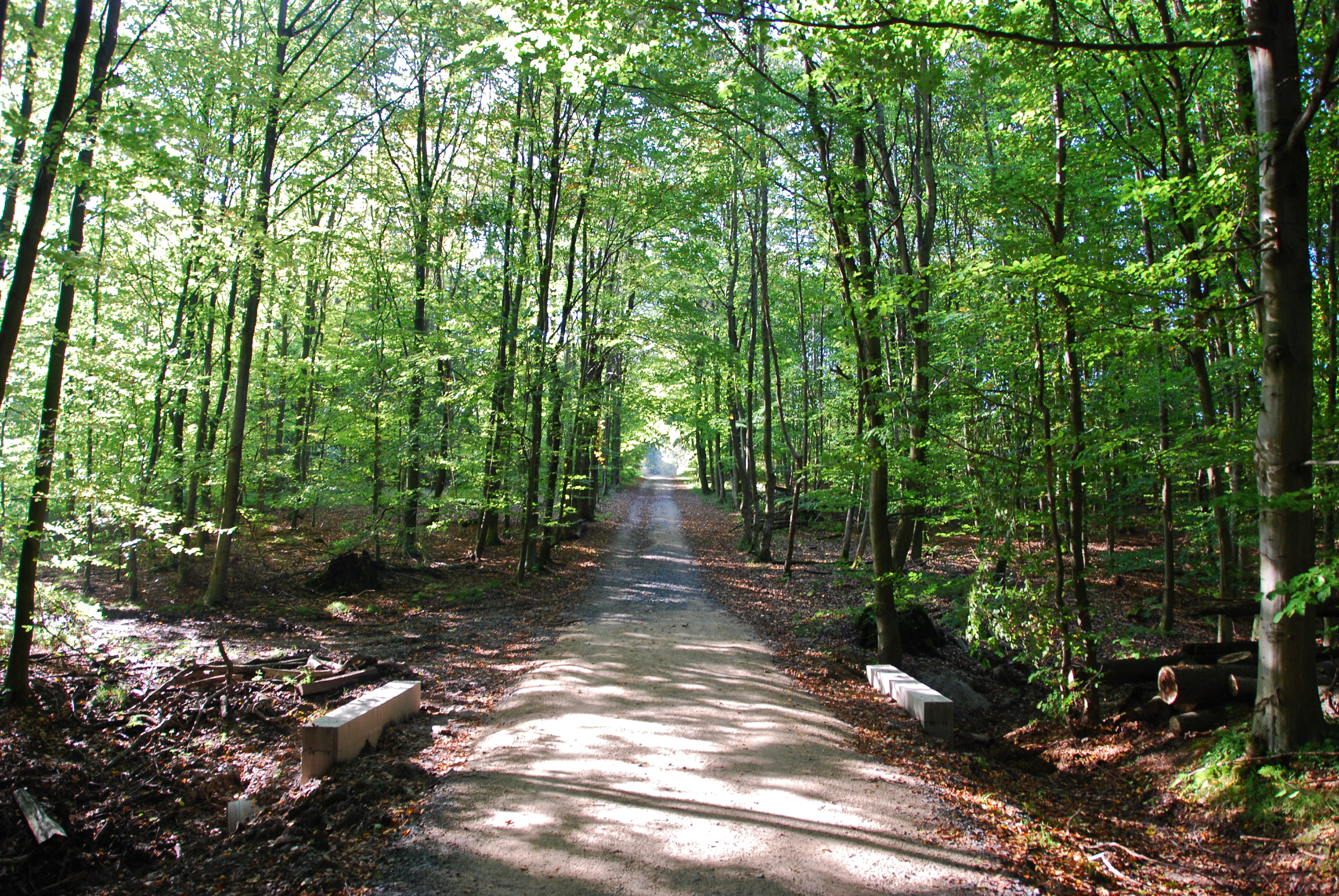
The Sonian Forest

Flanders shares its borders with Wallonia in the south, Brussels being an enclave within the Flemish Region. The rest of the border is shared with the Netherlands (Zeelandic Flanders in Zeeland, North Brabant and Limburg) in the north and east, and with France (French Flanders in Hauts-de-France) and the North Sea in the west. Voeren is an exclave of Flanders between Wallonia and the Netherlands, while Baarle-Hertog in Flanders forms a complicated series of enclaves and exclaves with Baarle-Nassau in the Netherlands. Germany, although bordering Wallonia and close to Voeren in Limburg, does not share a border with Flanders. The German-speaking Community of Belgium, also close to Voeren, does not border Flanders either. (The commune of Plombières, majority French speaking, lies between them.)

Flanders is a highly urbanised area, lying completely within the Blue Banana. Antwerp, Ghent, Bruges and Leuven are the largest cities of the Flemish Region. Antwerp has a population of more than 500,000 citizens and is the largest city, Ghent has a population of 250,000 citizens, followed by Bruges with 120,000 citizens and Leuven counts almost 100,000 citizens.

Brussels is a part of Flanders as far as community matters are concerned, but does not belong to the Flemish Region.

Flanders has two main geographical regions: the coastal Yser basin plain in the north-west and a central plain. The first consists mainly of sand dunes and clayey alluvial soils in the polders. Polders are areas of land, close to or below sea level that have been reclaimed from the sea, from which they are protected by dikes or, a little further inland, by fields that have been drained with canals. With similar soils along the lowermost Scheldt basin starts the central plain, a smooth, slowly rising fertile area irrigated by many waterways that reaches an average height of about five metres (16 feet) above sea level with wide valleys of its rivers upstream as well as the Campine region to the east having sandy soils at altitudes around thirty metres. (Note: The altitude of Mechelen, approximately in the middle of the central plain forming the large part of Flanders, is 7 m (23 ft) above sea level. Already closer to the higher southern Wallonia, the more eastern Leuven and Hasselt reach altitudes up to about 40 m (130 ft)) Near its southern edges close to Wallonia one can find slightly rougher land, richer in calcium, with low hills reaching up to 150 m (490 ft) and small valleys, and at the eastern border with the Netherlands, in the Meuse basin, there are marl caves (mergelgrotten). Its exclave around Voeren between the Dutch border and Wallonia's Liège Province attains a maximum altitude of 288 m (945 ft) above sea level.

=== Administrative divisions ===
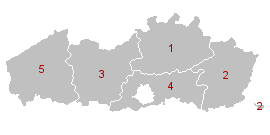
Provinces of Flanders

The present-day Flemish Region covers 13,625 km^{2} (5,261 sq mi) and is divided into five provinces, 22 arrondissements and 285 cities or municipalities.

Province		Capital city	Administrative arrondissements	Municipalities	Population (1 January 2024)	Area	Density
1	Antwerp (Antwerpen)	Antwerp (Antwerpen)	Antwerp, Mechelen, Turnhout	67	1,926,522	2,876 km^{2} (1,110 sq mi)	652/km^{2} (1,690/sq mi)
2	Limburg	Hasselt	Hasselt, Maaseik, Tongeren	38	900,098	2,427 km^{2} (937 sq mi)	363/km^{2} (940/sq mi)
3	East Flanders (Oost-Vlaanderen)	Ghent (Gent)	Aalst, Dendermonde, Eeklo, Ghent, Oudenaarde, Sint-Niklaas	55	1,572,002	3,007 km^{2} (1,161 sq mi)	509/km^{2} (1,320/sq mi)
4	Flemish Brabant (Vlaams-Brabant)	Leuven	Halle-Vilvoorde, Leuven	63	1,196,773	2,118 km^{2} (818 sq mi)	549/km^{2} (1,420/sq mi)
5	West Flanders (West-Vlaanderen)	Bruges (Brugge)	Bruges, Diksmuide, Ypres, Kortrijk, Ostend, Roeselare, Tielt, Veurne	62	1,226,375	3,197 km^{2} (1,234 sq mi)	376/km^{2} (970/sq mi)

The province of Flemish Brabant is the most recently created, being formed in 1995 after the splitting of the province of Brabant on a linguistic basis.

Most municipalities are made up of several former municipalities, now called deelgemeenten. The largest municipality (both in terms of population and area) is Antwerp, having more than half a million inhabitants. Its nine deelgemeenten have a special status and are called districts, which have an elected council and a college. While any municipality with more than 100,000 inhabitants can establish districts, only Antwerp did this so far. The smallest municipality (also both in terms of population and area) is Herstappe (Limburg).

Brussels-Capital Region with the City of Brussels (one of 19 municipalities) in red

The Flemish Community covers both the Flemish Region and, together with the French Community, the Brussels-Capital Region. Brussels, an enclave within the province of Flemish Brabant, is not divided into any province nor is it part of any. It coincides with the Arrondissement of Brussels-Capital and includes 19 municipalities.

The Flemish Government has its own local institutions in the Brussels-Capital Region, being the Vlaamse Gemeenschapscommissie (VGC), and its municipal antennae (Gemeenschapscentra, community centres for the Flemish community in Brussels). These institutions are independent from the educational, cultural and social institutions that depend directly on the Flemish Government. They exert, among others, all those cultural competences that outside Brussels fall under the provinces.

== Climate ==
The climate is maritime temperate, with significant precipitation in all seasons (Köppen climate classification: Cfb; the average temperature is 3 °C (37 °F) in January, and 21 °C (70 °F) in July; the average precipitation is 65 millimetres (2.6 inches) in January, and 78 millimetres (3.1 inches) in July).

== Economy ==
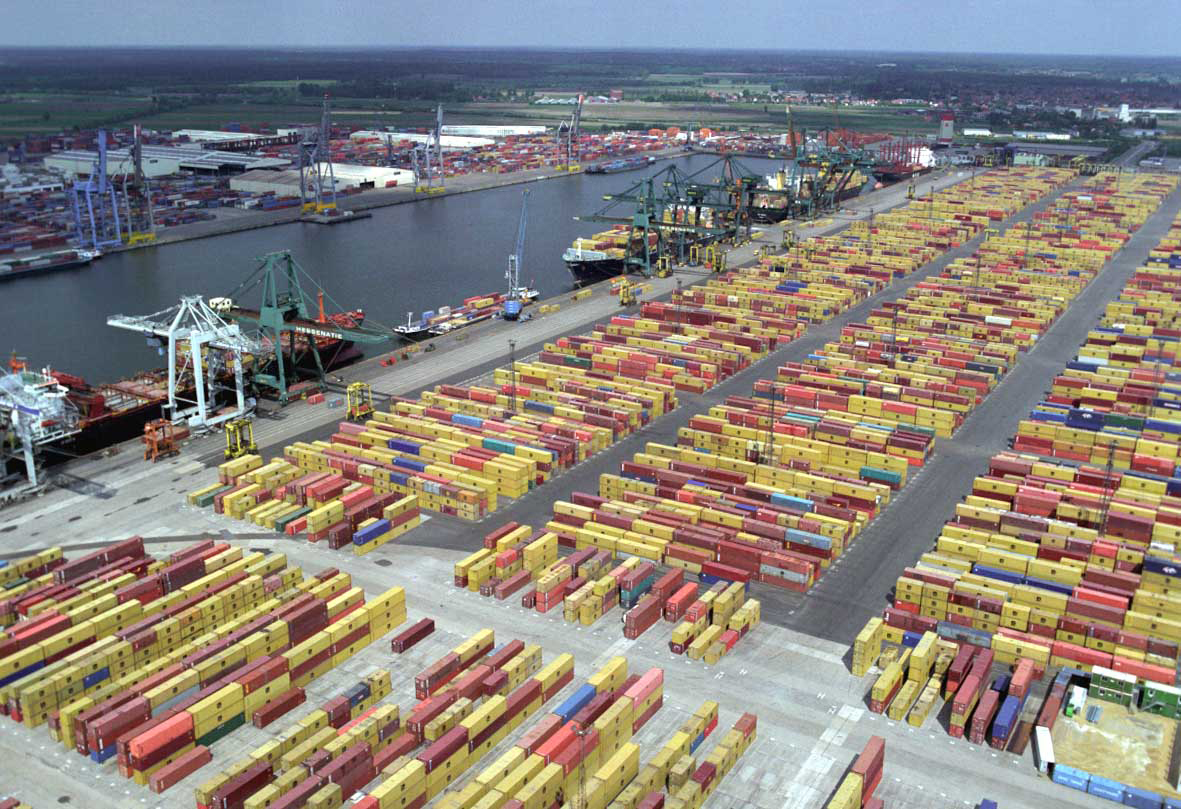
The Port of Antwerp is the second-largest in Europe.

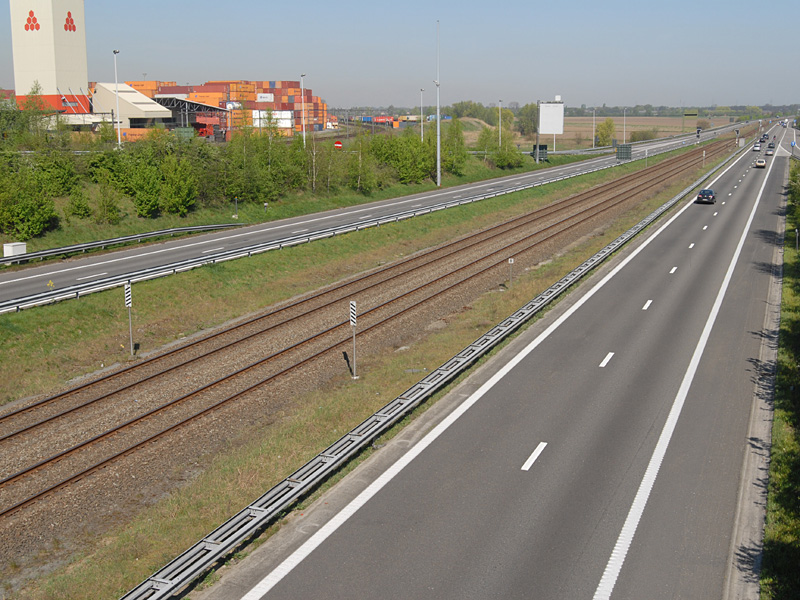
The A12 with a railway in the centre.

Total gross regional product (GRP) of Flanders in 2021 was €296 billion (excluding Brussels). Per capita GDP at purchasing power parity was 20% above the EU average. Flemish productivity per capita is about 13% higher than that in Wallonia, and wages are about 7% higher than in Wallonia.

Flanders was one of the first continental European areas to undergo the Industrial Revolution, in the 19th century. Initially, the modernization relied heavily on food processing and textile. However, by the 1840s the textile industry of Flanders was in severe crisis and there was famine in Flanders (1846–50). After World War II, Antwerp and Ghent experienced a rapid expansion of the chemical and petroleum industries. Flanders also attracted a large majority of foreign investments in Belgium. The 1973 and 1979 oil crises sent the economy into a recession. The steel industry remained in relatively good shape. In the 1980s and 90s, the economic centre of Belgium continued to shift further to Flanders and is now concentrated in the populous Flemish Diamond area. Nowadays, the Flemish economy is mainly service-oriented.

Belgium is a founding member of the European Coal and Steel Community in 1951, which evolved into the present-day European Union. In 1999, the euro, the single European currency, was introduced in Flanders. It replaced the Belgian franc in 2002.

The Flemish economy is strongly export-oriented, in particular of high value-added goods. The main imports are food products, machinery, rough diamonds, petroleum and petroleum products, chemicals, clothing and accessories, and textiles. The main exports are automobiles, food and food products, iron and steel, finished diamonds, textiles, plastics, petroleum products, and non-ferrous metals. Since 1922, Belgium and Luxembourg have been a single trade market within a customs and currency union—the Belgium–Luxembourg Economic Union. Its main trading partners are Germany, the Netherlands, France, the United Kingdom, Italy, the United States, and Spain.

Antwerp is the number one diamond market in the world, diamond exports account for roughly 1/10 of Belgian exports. The Antwerp-based BASF plant is the largest BASF base outside Germany, and accounts on its own for about 2% of Belgian exports. Other industrial and service activities in Antwerp include car manufacturing, telecommunications, and photographic products.

Flanders is home to several science and technology institutes, such as IMEC, VITO, Flanders DC, and Flanders Make.

=== Infrastructure ===
Flanders has developed an extensive transportation infrastructure of ports, canals, railways and highways. The Port of Antwerp is the second-largest in Europe, after Rotterdam. Other ports are Bruges-Zeebrugge, Ghent and Ostend, of which Zeebrugge and Ostend are located at the Belgian coast.

Whereas railways are managed by the federal National Railway Company of Belgium, other public transport (De Lijn) and roads are managed by the Flemish region.

The main airport is Brussels Airport, the only other civilian airport with scheduled services in Flanders is Antwerp International Airport, but there are two other ones with cargo or charter flights: Ostend-Bruges International Airport and Kortrijk-Wevelgem International Airport, both in West Flanders.

== Demographics ==
The highest population density is found in the area circumscribed by the Brussels-Antwerp-Ghent-Leuven agglomerations that surround Mechelen and is known as the Flemish Diamond, in other important urban centres as Bruges, Roeselare and Kortrijk to the west, and notable centres Turnhout and Hasselt to the east. On 1 January 2015, the Flemish Region had a population of 6,444,127 and about 20% of the 1,175,173 people in the Brussels Region are also considered Flemish. (Note: The relation between nationality, genetic ethnicity, native and mainly spoken language(s) (within a group of same ethnicity and age, in presence of elders, in ethnically mixed groups), and minority group identification, can be complex: Dutch nationals constituting one of the largest groups of foreigners, share the standard language with Flemish locals but their accent is enough to immediately distinguish them. The majority of immigrants from certain other countries had belonged to a minority or disadvantaged group there. Children born in Belgium from residents of foreign nationality very often acquired Belgian citizenship. Regardless of nationality, according to Belgian Law, obligatory education in schools located in the Flemish Region are in the Dutch language. In Brussels, teaching is also done in French. The determination of statistical samples and interpretation of publicized figures can easily lead to false assumptions or conclusions.)

=== Religion ===
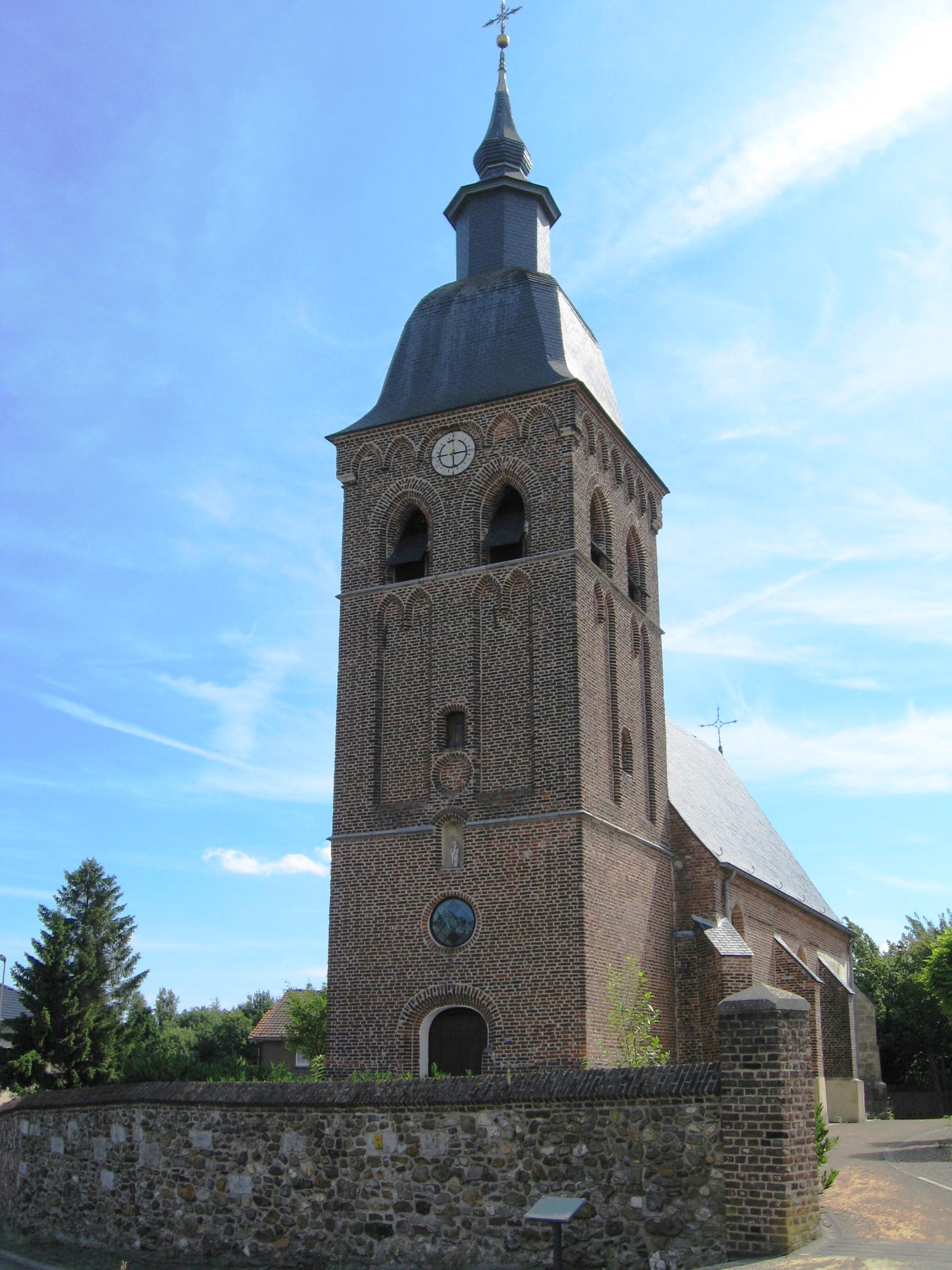
A church in Houthalen. A typical church, similar to those in towns in Flanders.

The Belgian constitution provides for freedom of religion, and the various governments in general respect this right in practice. Since independence, Catholicism, counterbalanced by strong freethought movements, has had an important role in Belgium's politics, since the 20th century in Flanders mainly via the Christian trade union ACV and the Christian Democratic and Flemish party (CD&V). According to the 2001 Survey and Study of Religion, about 47 percent of the Belgian population identify themselves as belonging to the Catholic Church, while Islam is the second-largest religion at 3.5 percent. A 2006 inquiry in Flanders, considered more religious than Wallonia, showed that 55% considered themselves religious, and 36% believed that God created the world.

Jews have been present in Flanders for a long time, in particular in Antwerp. More recently, Muslims have immigrated to Flanders, now forming the largest minority religion with about 3.9% in the Flemish Region and 25% in Brussels. The largest Muslim group is Moroccan in origin, while the second-largest is Turkish in origin.

=== Education ===
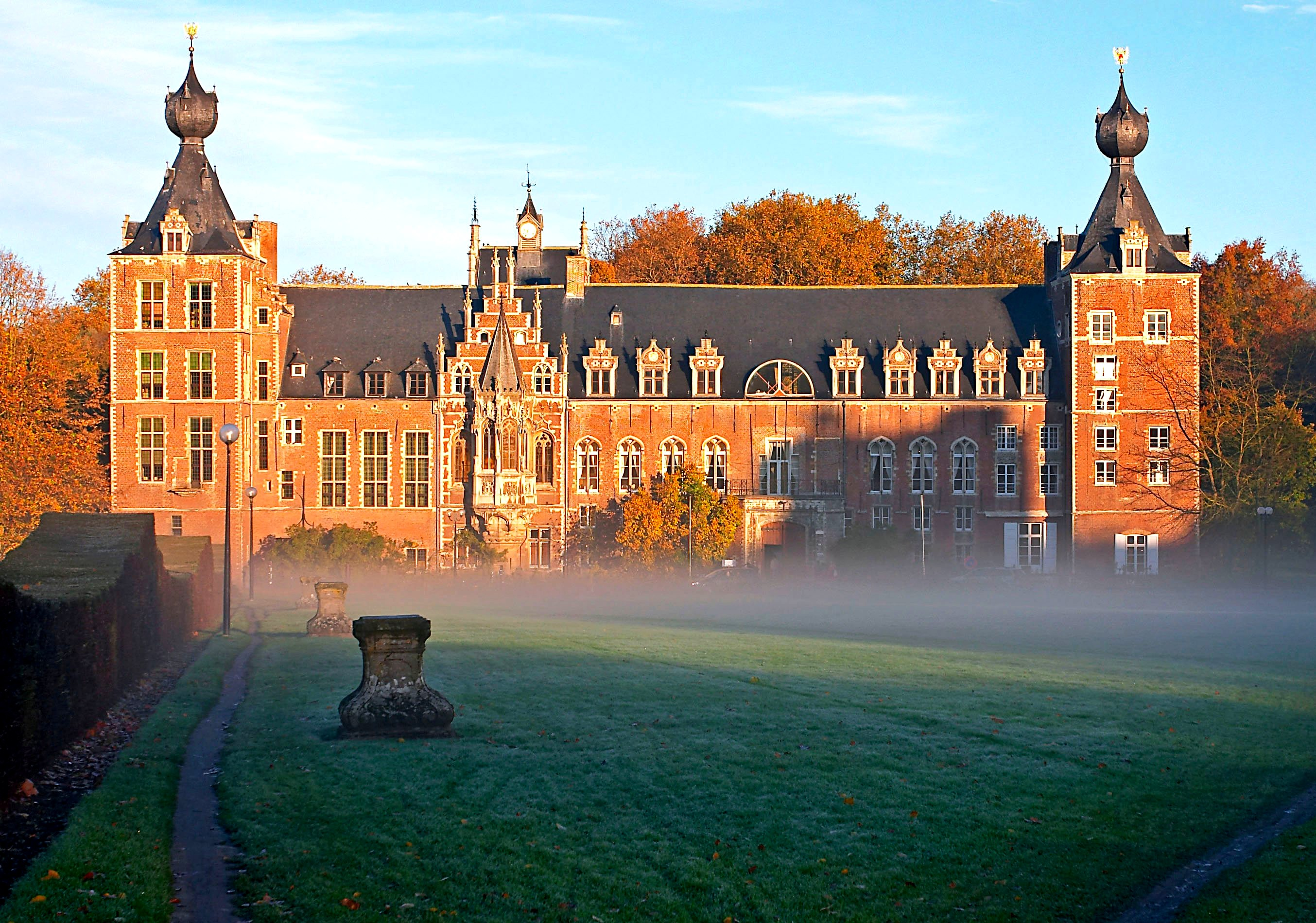
Arenberg Castle, part of the Katholieke Universiteit Leuven, the oldest university in Belgium and the Low Countries.

Education is compulsory from the ages of six to 18, but most Flemings continue to study until around 23. Among the Organisation for Economic Co-operation and Development countries in 1999, Flanders had the third-highest proportion of 18- to 21-year-olds enrolled in postsecondary education. Flanders also scores very high in international comparative studies on education. Its secondary school students consistently rank among the top three for mathematics and science. However, the success is not evenly spread: ethnic minority youth score consistently lower, and the difference is larger than in most comparable countries.

Mirroring the historical political conflicts between the secular and Catholic segments of the population, the Flemish educational system is split into a secular branch controlled by the communities, the provinces, or the municipalities, and a subsidised religious—mostly Catholic—branch. For the subsidised schools, the main costs such as the teacher's wages and building maintenance completely borne by the Flemish government. Subsidised schools are also free to determine their own teaching and examination methods, but in exchange, they must be able to prove that certain minimal terms are achieved by keeping records of the given lessons and exams. It should however be noted that—at least for the Catholic schools—the religious authorities have very limited power over these schools, neither do the schools have a lot of power on their own. Instead, the Catholic schools are a member of the Catholic umbrella organisation VSKO. The VSKO determines most practicalities for schools, like the advised schedules per study field. However, there is freedom of education in Flanders, meaning that not only can every pupil choose his/her preferred school, but also that every organisation can found a school, and even be subsidised when abiding by the relevant rules. This resulted also in some smaller school systems that follow 'methodical pedagogies' (e.g. Steiner, Montessori, or Freinet) or serve the Jewish and Protestant minorities.

During the school year 2003–2004, 68.30% of the total population of children between the ages of six and 18 went to subsidized private schools (both religious schools or 'methodical pedagogies' schools).

The large amount of freedom given to schools results in a constant competition to be the "best" school. The schools acquire certain reputations amongst parents and employers, thus it is important for schools to be viewed as the best school since the subsidies depend on the number of pupils. This competition has been pinpointed as one of the main reasons for the high overall quality of the Flemish education. However, the importance of a school's reputation also makes schools more eager to expel pupils that don't perform well. Resulting in the ethnic differences and the well-known waterfall system: pupils start high in the perceived hierarchy, and then drop towards more professional oriented directions or "easier" schools when they can't handle the pressure any longer.

=== Healthcare ===
Healthcare is a federal matter, but the Flemish Government is responsible for care, health education and preventive care.

== Culture ==
=== Language and literature ===
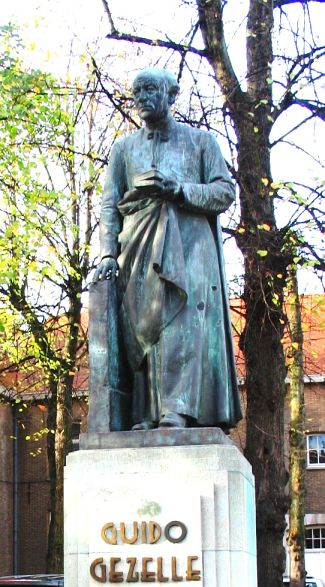
Statue of Gezelle in Bruges, by sculptor Jules Lagae

The standard language in Flanders is Dutch; spelling and grammar are regulated by a single authority, the Dutch Language Union (Nederlandse Taalunie), comprising a committee of ministers of the Flemish and Dutch governments, their advisory council of appointed experts, a controlling commission of 22 parliamentarians, and a secretariate. The term Flemish can be applied to the Dutch spoken in Flanders; it shows many regional and local variations.

The earliest example of literature in non-standardized dialects in the current area of Flanders is Hendrik van Veldeke's Eneas Romance, the first courtly romance in a Germanic language (12th century). With a writer of Hendrik Conscience's stature, Flemish literature rose ahead of French literature in Belgium's early history. Guido Gezelle not only explicitly referred to his writings as Flemish but used it in many of his poems, and strongly defended it:

Original from kleengedichtjes (1860?)

Gij zegt dat 't vlaamsch te niet zal gaan:
't en zal!
dat 't waalsch gezwets zal boven slaan:
't en zal!
Dat hopen, dat begeren wij:
dat zeggen en dat zweren wij:
zoo lange als wij ons weren, wij:
't en zal, 't en zal,
't en zal!

Translation

You say Flemish will fade away:
It shan't!
that Walloon twaddle will have its way:
It shan't!
This we hope, for this we hanker:
this we say and this we vow:
as long as we fight back, we:
It shan't, It shan't,
It shan't!

The distinction between Dutch and Flemish literature, often perceived politically, is also made on intrinsic grounds by some experts such as Kris Humbeeck, professor of literature at the University of Antwerp. Nevertheless, most Dutch-language literature read (and appreciated to varying degrees) in Flanders is the same as that in the Netherlands.

Influential Flemish writers include Ernest Claes, Stijn Streuvels and Felix Timmermans. Their novels mostly describe rural life in Flanders in the 19th century and at beginning of the 20th. Widely read by the older generations, they are considered somewhat old-fashioned by present-day critics. Some famous Flemish writers of the early 20th century wrote in French, including Nobel Prize winners (1911) Maurice Maeterlinck and Emile Verhaeren. They were followed by a younger generation, including Paul van Ostaijen and Gaston Burssens, who activated the Flemish Movement. Still widely read and translated into other languages (including English) are the novels of authors such as Willem Elsschot, Louis Paul Boon and Hugo Claus. The recent crop of writers includes the novelists Tom Lanoye and Herman Brusselmans, and poets such as the married couple Herman de Coninck and Kristien Hemmerechts.

==== Languages ====
At the creation of the Belgian state, French was the only official language. Historically Flanders was a Dutch-speaking region. For a long period, French was used as a second language and, like elsewhere in Europe, commonly spoken among the aristocracy. There is still a French-speaking minority in Flanders, especially in the municipalities with language facilities, along the language border and the Brussels periphery (Vlaamse Rand), though many of them are French-speakers that migrated to Flanders in recent decades.

In French Flanders, French is the only official language and now the native language of the majority of the population, but there is still a minority of Dutch-speakers living there. French is also the primary language in the officially bilingual Brussels Capital Region (see Francization of Brussels).

Many Flemings are also able to speak French, children in Flanders generally get their first French lessons in the 5th primary year (normally around 10 years). But the current lack of French outside the educational context makes it hard to maintain a decent level of French. As such, the proficiency of French is declining. Flemish pupils are also obligated to follow English lessons as their third language. Normally from the second secondary year (around 14 years old), but the ubiquity of English in movies, music, IT and even advertisements makes it easier to learn and maintain the English language.

=== Media ===
The public radio and television broadcaster in Flanders is VRT, which operates the TV channels VRT 1, VRT Canvas, Ketnet, and (together with the Netherlands) BVN. Flemish provinces each have up to two TV channels as well. Commercial television broadcasters include vtm and Vier (VT4). Popular TV series are for example Thuis and F.C. De Kampioenen.

The five most successful Flemish films were Loft (2008; 1,186,071 visitors), Koko Flanel (1990; 1,082,000 tickets sold), Hector (1987; 933,000 tickets sold), Daens (1993; 848,000 tickets sold) and De Zaak Alzheimer (2003; 750,000 tickets sold). The first and last ones were directed by Erik Van Looy, and an American remake is being made of both of them, respectively The Loft (2012) and The Memory of a Killer. The other three ones were directed by Stijn Coninx.

Newspapers are grouped under three main publishers: De Persgroep with Het Laatste Nieuws, the most popular newspaper in Flanders, De Morgen and De Tijd. Then Corelio with De Gentenaar, the oldest extant Flemish newspaper, Het Nieuwsblad and De Standaard. Lastly, Concentra publishes Gazet van Antwerpen and Het Belang van Limburg.

Magazines include Knack and HUMO.

=== Sports ===
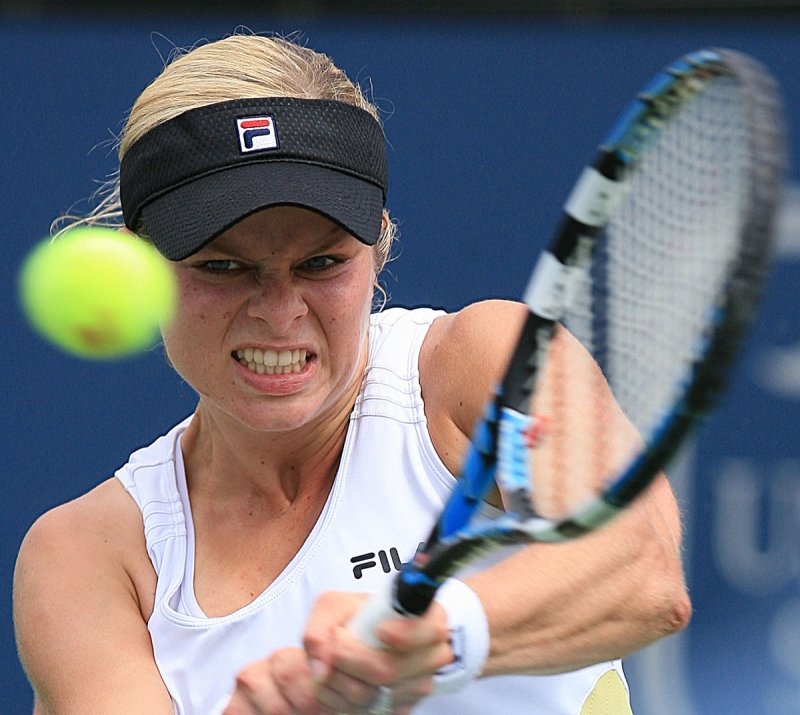
Kim Clijsters was WTA Player of the Year in 2005 and 2010

Association football (soccer) is one of the most popular sports in both parts of Belgium, together with cycling, tennis, swimming and judo.

In cycling, the Tour of Flanders is considered one of the five "Monuments". Other "Flanders Classics" races include Dwars door Vlaanderen and Gent–Wevelgem. Eddy Merckx is widely regarded as the greatest cyclist of all time, with five victories in the Tour de France and numerous other cycling records. His hour speed record (set in 1972) stood for 12 years.

Jean-Marie Pfaff, a former Belgian goalkeeper, is considered one of the greatest in the history of football (soccer).

Kim Clijsters (as well as the French-speaking Belgian Justine Henin) was Player of the Year twice in the Women's Tennis Association as she was ranked the number one female tennis player.

Kim Gevaert and Tia Hellebaut are notable track and field stars from Flanders.

The 1920 Summer Olympics were held in Antwerp. Jacques Rogge was president of the International Olympic Committee from 2001 to 2013.

The Flemish government agency for sports is Bloso.

=== Music ===
Flanders is known for its music festivals, like the annual Rock Werchter, Tomorrowland and Pukkelpop. The Gentse Feesten is another very large yearly event.

The best-selling Flemish group or artist is the (Flemish-Dutch) group 2 Unlimited, followed by (Italian-born) Rocco Granata, Technotronic, Helmut Lotti and Vaya Con Dios.

The weekly charts of best-selling singles is the Ultratop 50. "Kvraagetaan" by the Fixkes holds the current record for longest time at No. 1 on the chart.

== See also ==
- Burgundian Netherlands
- Count of Flanders
- Flemish Movement
- Flemish Parliament
- Flemish Primitives
- Seventeen Provinces
