= Lichtervelde =

- Municipality
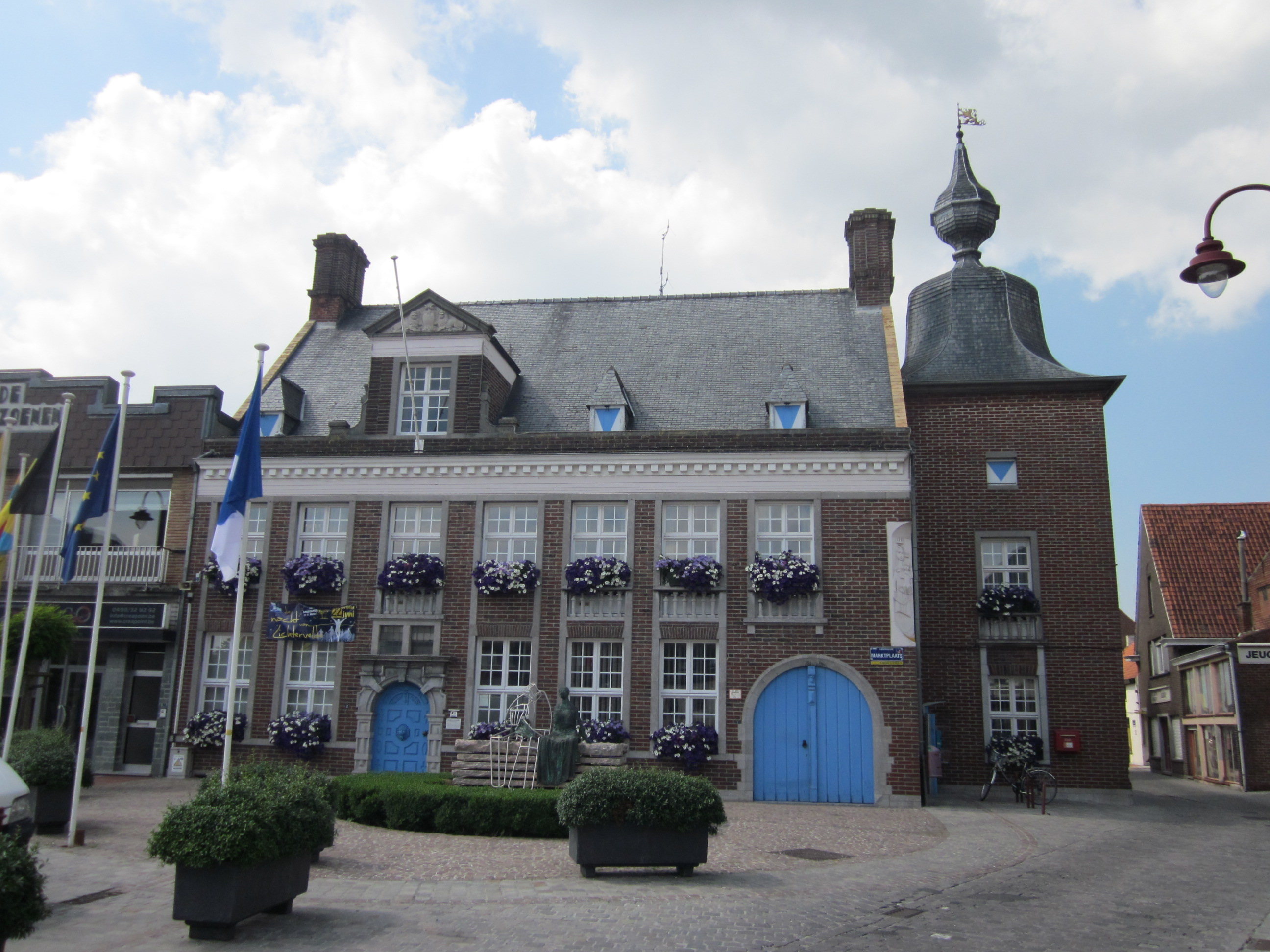
- Town hall of Lichtervelde

- Flag Coat of arms

- Location of Lichtervelde in West Flanders
- Interactive map of Lichtervelde
- Location in Belgium
- Coordinates: 51°02′N 03°08′E
- Country: Belgium
- Community: Flemish Community
- Region: Flemish Region
- Province: West Flanders
- Arrondissement: Roeselare

Government
  - Mayor: Ria Beeusaert-Pattyn
  - Governing party: CD&V

Area
  - Total: 26.16 km^{2} (10.10 sq mi)

Population (2018-01-01)
  - Total: 8,793
  - Density: 336.1/km^{2} (870.6/sq mi)
- Postal codes: 8810
- NIS code: 36011
- Area codes: 051
- Website: www.lichtervelde.be

Lichtervelde (Dutch pronunciation: [ˈlɪxtərˌvɛldə], West Flemish: [ˈlɛhtərˌvældə]) is a municipality located in the Belgian province of West Flanders. The municipality comprises only the town of Lichtervelde. On January 1, 2006 Lichtervelde had a total population of 8,400. The total area is 25.93 km² which gives a population density of 324 inhabitants per km². The church is 64 m high. In this town the inventor Charles Joseph Van Depoele was born.

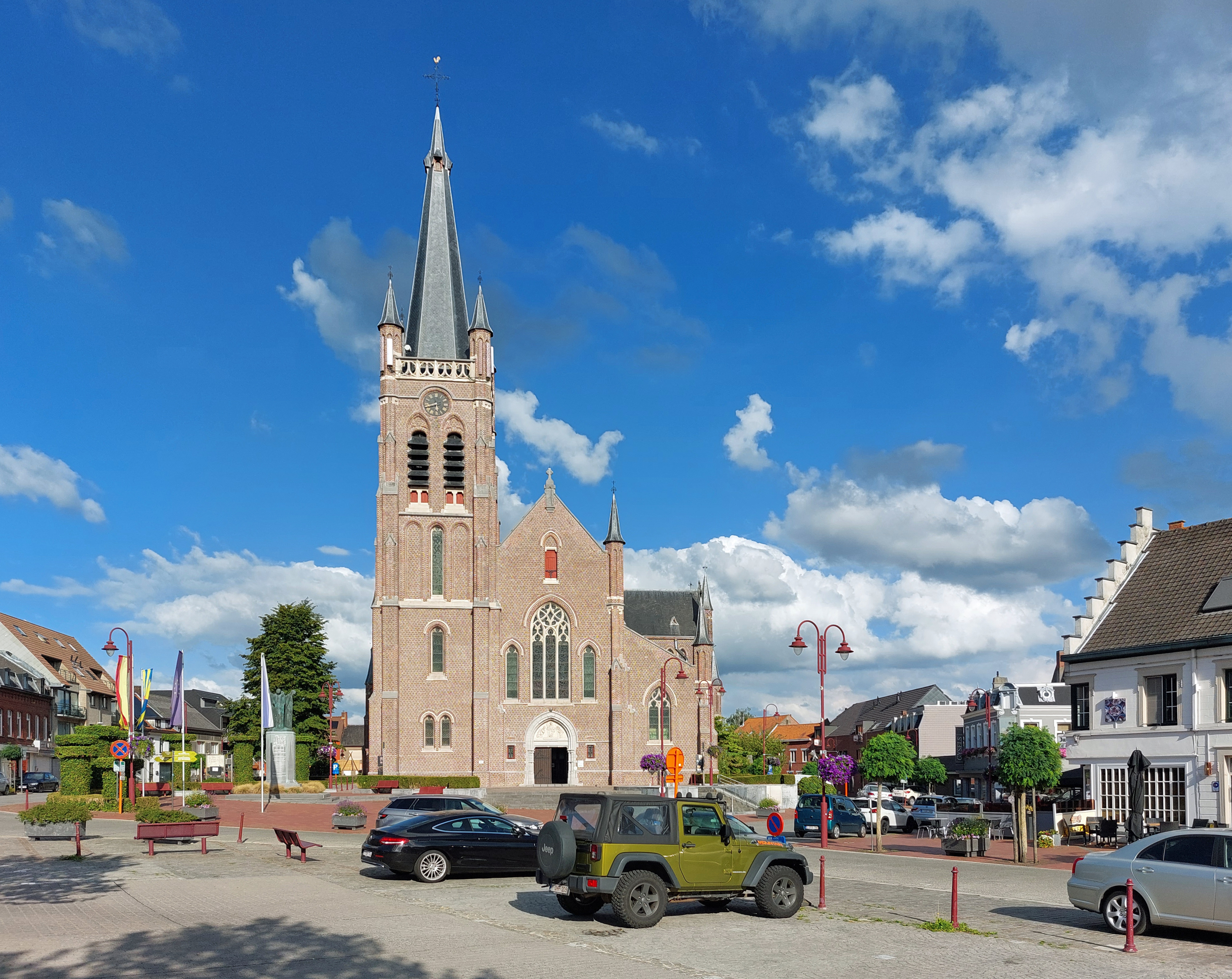
Market Place and Sint-Jacobus church

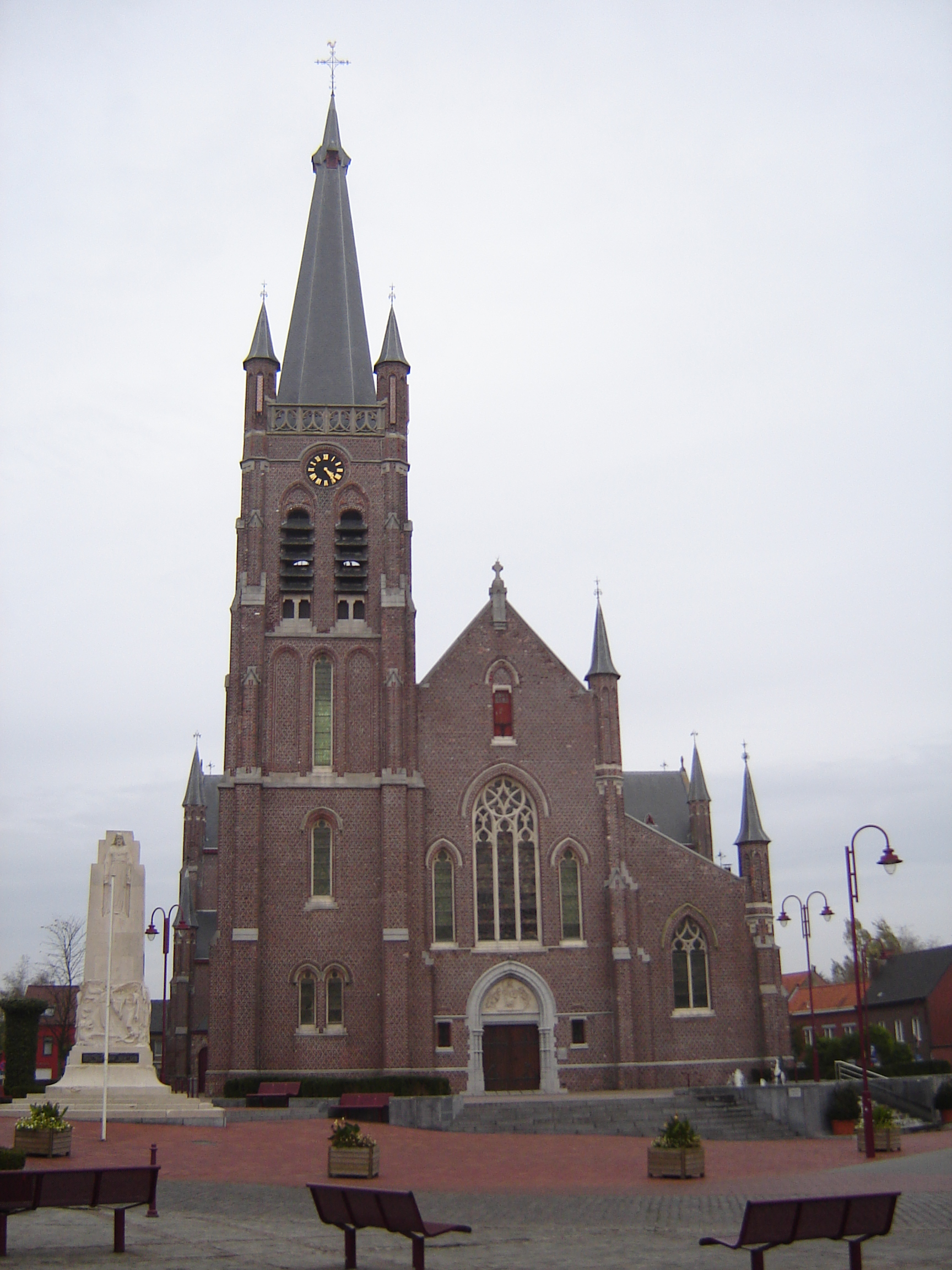
Sint-Jacobus church

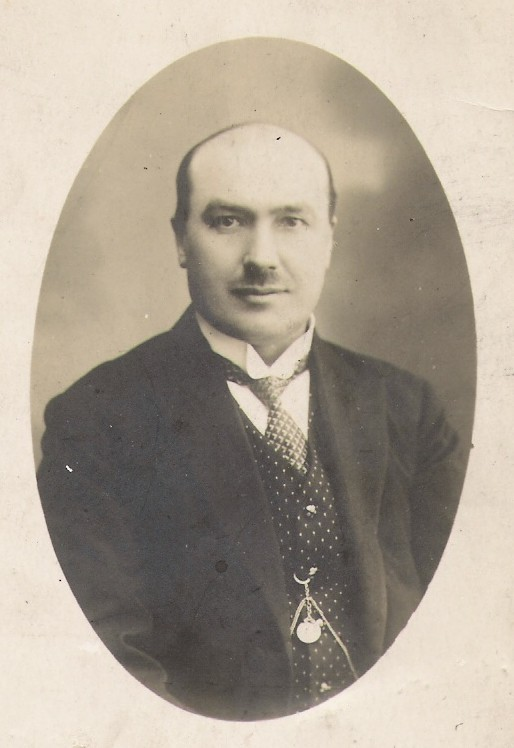
Gustaaf Colpaert, mayor 1927-1932

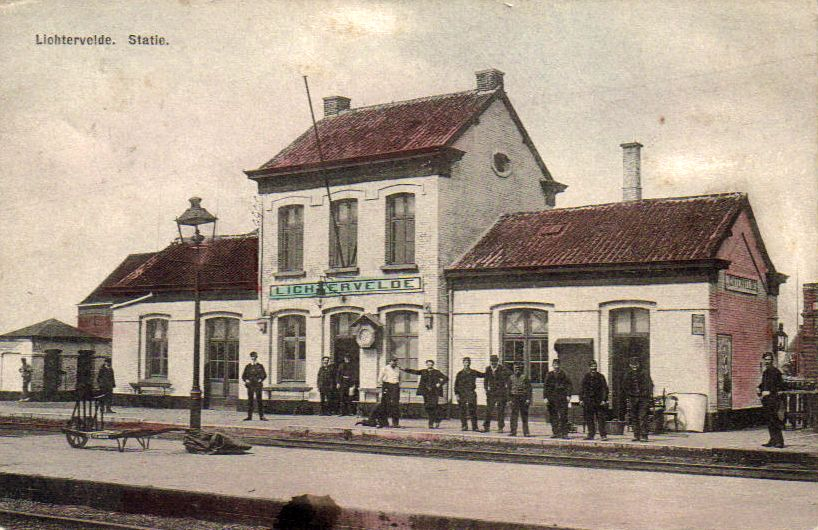
The railway station beginning 20th Century postcard

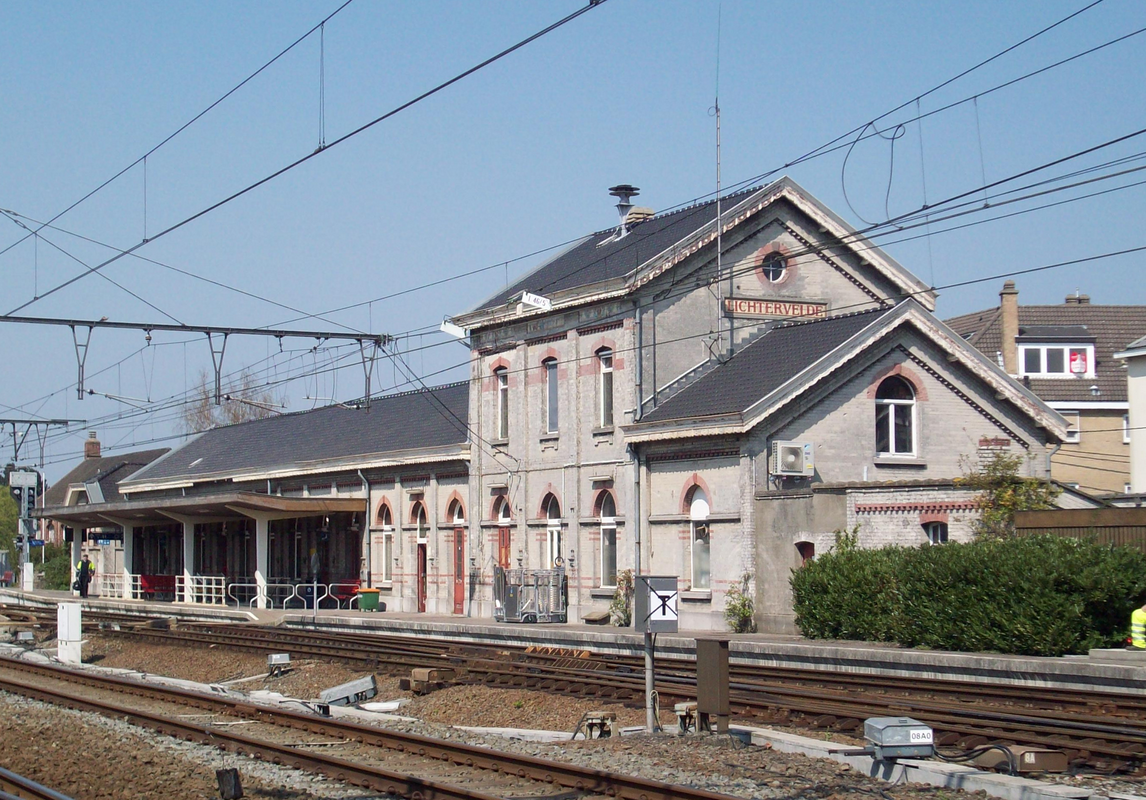
Lichtervelde station of NMBS
