= Dentergem =

- Municipality
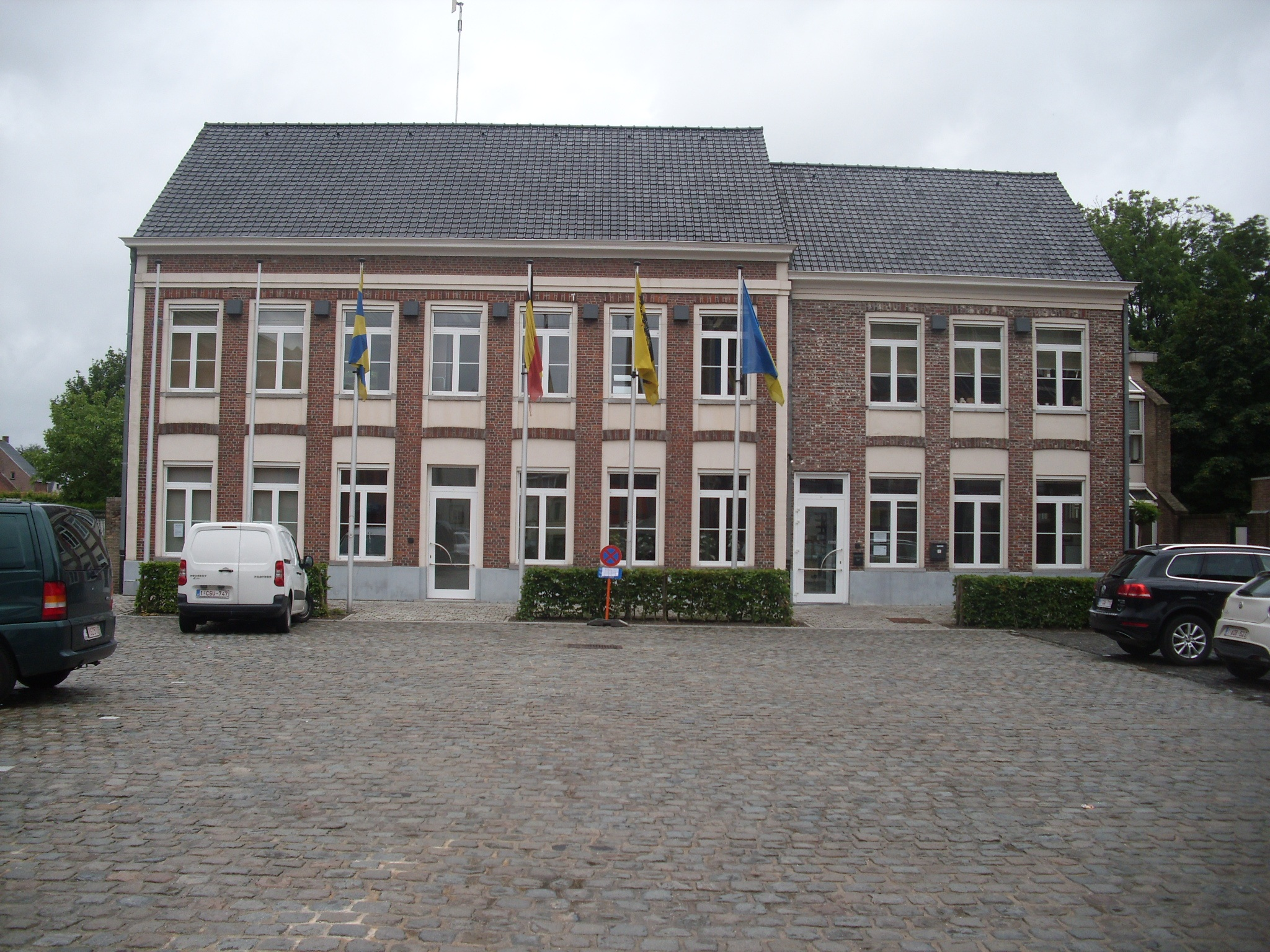
- Dentergem town hall

- Flag Coat of arms

- Location of Dentergem in West Flanders
- Interactive map of Dentergem
- Location in Belgium
- Coordinates: 50°57′N 03°25′E
- Country: Belgium
- Community: Flemish Community
- Region: Flemish Region
- Province: West Flanders
- Arrondissement: Tielt

Government
  - Mayor: Koenraad Degroote
  - Governing party: Eendracht

Area
  - Total: 26.09 km^{2} (10.07 sq mi)

Population (2018-01-01)
  - Total: 8,484
  - Density: 325.2/km^{2} (842.2/sq mi)
- Postal codes: 8720
- NIS code: 37002
- Area codes: 051 - 056 - 09
- Website: www.dentergem.be

Dentergem (Dutch pronunciation: [ˈdɛntərɣɛm], West Flemish: [ˈdæntərɦæm]) is a municipality, located in the Belgian province of West Flanders. The municipality comprises the towns of Dentergem proper, Markegem, Oeselgem and Wakken. On January 1, 2006, Dentergem had a total population of 8,188. The total area is 25.94 km^{2} which gives a population density of 316 inhabitants per km^{2}.
