= Ichtegem =

- Municipality
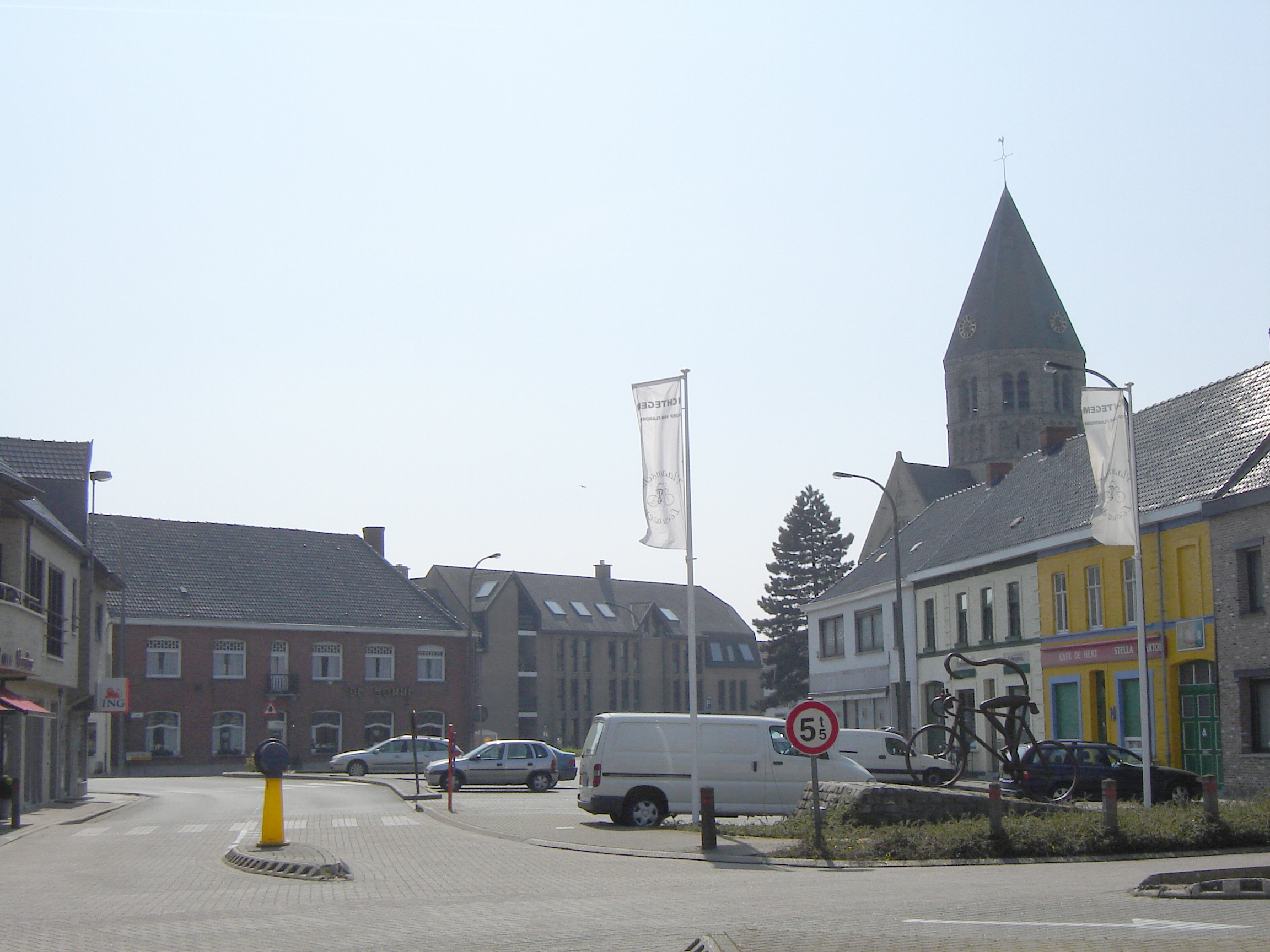

- Flag Coat of arms

- Location of Ichtegem in West Flanders
- Interactive map of Ichtegem
- Location in Belgium
- Coordinates: 51°05′34″N 03°00′38″E
- Country: Belgium
- Community: Flemish Community
- Region: Flemish Region
- Province: West Flanders
- Arrondissement: Ostend

Government
  - Mayor: Lieven Cobbaert (Open VLD)
  - Governing party: Liberaal 2018, WIT

Area
  - Total: 45.78 km^{2} (17.68 sq mi)

Population (2018-01-01)
  - Total: 13,939
  - Density: 304.5/km^{2} (788.6/sq mi)
- Postal codes: 8480
- NIS code: 35006
- Area codes: 050, 051, 059
- Website: www.ichtegem.be

Ichtegem (Dutch pronunciation: [ˈɪxtəɣɛm]) is a municipality located in the Belgian province of West Flanders 15 km southwest of Bruges. The municipality comprises the towns of Bekegem, Eernegem and Ichtegem proper. On January 1, 2006 Ichtegem had a total population of 13,423. The total area is 45.33 km^{2} which gives a population density of 296 inhabitants per km^{2}. The current mayor is Karl Bonny.

In 2006, Ichtegem was declared the official Dorp van de Ronde (Town of the Tour) for the 90th annual road cycling race the Tour of Flanders.

Ichtegem also gained a bit of notoriety when on November 20, 1990, a man was stabbed to death during a concert of American progressive metal band Queensrÿche at the local sports hall Keiberg.

Map of Ichtegem, neighbourhoods within the municipality and its neighbours. The orange/yellow areas are urban areas.

Ichtegem:

- I. Ichtegem
- II. Eernegem
- III. Bekegem

Neighbouring villages:

- a. Koekelare
- b. Moere (Gistel)
- c. Westkerke (Oudenburg)
- d. Roksem (Oudenburg)
- e. Zerkegem (Jabbeke)
- f. Aartrijke (Zedelgem)
- g. Wijnendale (Torhout)
- h. Torhout
- i. Kortemark
- j. Handzame (Kortemark)
