= Arrondissement of Ostend =

Arrondissement of Ostend Arrondissement Oostende
- Arrondissement
- Location of the arrondissement in West Flanders
- Coordinates: 51.2°N 2.9°E
- Country: Belgium
- Region: Flanders
- Province: West Flanders
- Municipalities: 7

Area
  - Total: 304.6 km^{2} (117.6 sq mi)

Population (2021)
  - Total: 158,153
  - Density: 519.2/km^{2} (1,345/sq mi)
- Time zone: UTC+1 (CET)
  - Summer (DST): UTC+2 (CEST)

The Arrondissement of Ostend (Dutch: Arrondissement Oostende; French: Arrondissement d'Ostende) is one of the eight administrative arrondissements in the Province of West Flanders, Belgium. Spanning approximately 304.6 km^{2} (117.6 sq mi), it comprises seven municipalities. As per the 2021 census, it had an estimated 158,153 residents. Located in northern part of West Flanders, it serves as a significant economic and transport hub, with a major port, airport, and coastal tourism centered around the city of Ostend.

== History ==
The Arrondissement of Ostend, has a history of being influenced by various European powers with the city of Ostend, which is the administrative center of the arrondissement, a significant port and strategic location for centuries. During the late 16th and early 17th centuries, Ostend was the site of a notable siege (1601-1604) during the Eighty Years War, highlighting its military importance.

== Geography ==
The Arrondissement of Ostend is located in the northwestern part of Belgium, within the province of West Flanders, which is part of the Flemish Region. panning approximately 304.6 km^{2} (117.6 sq mi), it borders the North Sea to the north, giving it a significant coastline. The topography is predominantly flat and low-lying, characteristic of the Flemish coastal plain. Much of the land along the North Sea coast is composed of sand dunes, polders (reclaimed land protected by dikes), and beaches.

The Administrative Arrondissement of Ostend consists of seven municipalities: Bredene, De Haan, Gistel, Ichtegem, Middelkerke, Ostend, and Oudenburg.

== Demographics ==
As per the 2021 census, the Arrondissement of Ostend had a population of 158,153 inhabitants. This makes it the third most populated arrondissement in West Flanders. The economy of the arrondissement is largely driven by its coastal location and the presence of a major port. Tourism is a major contributor to the economy, particularly in the city of Ostend and other coastal municipalities like De Haan and Middelkerke, which attract numerous visitors to their beaches and resorts.

The Port of Ostend is a major port, supporting activities such as ferry services, fishing, offshore wind energy, and cargo handling. Ostend-Bruges International Airport serves the region, providing both passenger and cargo flights. A comprehensive tram line (Kusttram) runs along the Belgian coast, connecting the various coastal towns and villages, including those within the Arrondissement of Ostend, providing public transport for residents and tourists.
