= Arrondissement of Roeselare =

Arrondissement of Roeselare Arrondissement Roeselare
- Arrondissement
- Location of the arrondissement in West Flanders
- Coordinates: 50°55′N 03°10′E
- Country: Belgium
- Region: Flanders
- Province: West Flanders
- Municipalities: 8

Area
  - Total: 271.54 km^{2} (104.84 sq mi)

Population (1 January 2017)
  - Total: 150,742
  - Density: 555.14/km^{2} (1,437.8/sq mi)
- Time zone: UTC+1 (CET)
  - Summer (DST): UTC+2 (CEST)

The Arrondissement of Roeselare (Dutch: Arrondissement Roeselare; French: Arrondissement de Roulers) is one of the eight administrative arrondissements in the Province of West Flanders, Belgium.

The Administrative Arrondissement of Roeselare consists of the following municipalities:

- Hooglede
- Ingelmunster
- Izegem
- Ledegem
- Lichtervelde
- Moorslede
- Roeselare
- Staden
