= N6 road (Belgium) =

National road in Belgium

National Route 6
- Dutch: Nationale Weg 6 French: Route nationale 6

Route information
- Length: 68 km (42 mi)

Major junctions
- From: Brussels
- To: Quévy

Location
- Country: Belgium
- Major cities: Brussels, Halle, Mons

Highway system
- Highways of Belgium; Motorways; National Roads

The N6 is a national route in Belgium that connects Brussels with Mons and the French border near Quévy.

The road is one of the 9 major national routes and starts at the Brussels inner ring road. It goes southwest through the major suburb Anderlecht. The road crosses the Brussels Ring road, R0 before shortly entering Flanders. In Flanders, it only passes the midsized city Halle. Just south of Halle, the road enters Wallonia, passing cities like Tubize, Soignies and the E42/E19 highway before reaching the major city of Mons, the capital of the Hainaut Province. After Mons, the road directs south to connect the city with the French city Maubeuge. The road ends at the border in Quévy.

The N6 crosses or borders 11 municipalities. 2 in the Brussels Capital Region, 3 in Flemish Brabant, 2 in Walloon Brabant and 4 in Hainaut. A full list of municipalities can be found below. Major municipalities are in bold.

Region	Province	Municipality	Population	Length of N6 (km)
Brussels Capital Region	/	**City of Brussels**	188737	0.1
Brussels Capital Region	/	Anderlecht	122547	5.7
Flanders	Flemish Brabant	Sint-Pieters-Leeuw	35486	7.1
Flanders	Flemish Brabant	Beersel	26013	2.0
Flanders	Flemish Brabant	**Halle**	41281	5.9
Wallonia	Walloon Brabant	**Tubize**	27774	5.3
Wallonia	Walloon Brabant	Rebecq	10977	3.0
Wallonia	Hainaut	Braine-le-Comte	22752	8.1
Wallonia	Hainaut	**Soignies**	28523	12.1
Wallonia	Hainaut	**Mons**	96545	14.2
Wallonia	Hainaut	Quévy	8087	7.1

== Junction list ==
Province	Municipality	Section	Junction	Northbound destinations	Southbound destinations
(European Union) (Belgium) Brussels-capital Region	City of Brussels	Brussels- Anderlecht	Brussels (188.737 inh.) R20 Brussels inner ring road	Brussels	Halle Mons
(European Union) (Belgium) Brussels-capital Region	Anderlecht	Brussels- Anderlecht	Brussels–Charleroi Canal N215 Cartier Heyvaert N274 Scheut Anderlecht (122.547 inh.) N282 Erasmus Hospital, Lennik (Sint-Pieters-Leeuw) R0, Brussels Ring, Brussels Airport, Waterloo, Liège (E40), Leuven (E40), Ghent (E40), Antwerp (E19), Charleroi (E19), Mons (E19), Namur (E411), Tournai (E429)	Brussels	Halle Mons
(European Union) (Belgium) Flanders Flemish Brabant	Sint-Pieters-Leeuw	Sint-Pieters-Leeuw - Halle	Negenmanneke (6.915 inh.) Zuun	Brussels	Halle Mons
(European Union) (Belgium) Flanders Flemish Brabant	Sint-Pieters-Leeuw / Beersel	Sint-Pieters-Leeuw - Halle	The N6 forms the border between Sint-Pieters-Leeuw and Beersel. Lot (5.032)	Brussels	Halle Mons
(European Union) (Belgium) Flanders Flemish Brabant	Sint-Pieters-Leeuw	Sint-Pieters-Leeuw - Halle	Sint-Pieters-Leeuw (35.486 inh.)	Brussels	Halle Mons
(European Union) (Belgium) Flanders Flemish Brabant	Halle	Sint-Pieters-Leeuw - Halle	Halle (41.284 inh.) N28 Pepingen, Ninove Start of concurrency with N28 N7 Hondzocht, Enghien, Ath, Tournai End of concurrency with N28 N28 Braine-le-Château, Nivelles E429, N203a (Halle-Center) Brussels (E19), Enghien, Ath, Tournai, France (Lille, Paris) Lembeek (7.905 inh.)	Brussels	Tubize Mons
(European Union) (Belgium) Wallonia Walloon Brabant	Tubize	Tubize - Rebecq	Tubize (27.774 inh.) Renard	Halle Brussels	Soignies Mons
(European Union) (Belgium) Wallonia Walloon Brabant	Rebecq	Tubize - Rebecq	N280 Virginal-Samme, Ittre	Halle Brussels	Soignies Mons
(European Union) (Belgium) (Wallonia) WalloniaHainaut	Braine-le-Comte	Braine-le-Comte - Mons	N533 Henripont, Ronquières, Nivelles Braine-le-Comte (22.752 inh.) N532 Écaussinnes, La Louvière N57, N57b Écaussinnes, La Louvière, Soignies, Enghien, Silly, Ath, Lessines, Ronse	Tubize Brussels	Soignies Mons
(European Union) (Belgium) (Wallonia) WalloniaHainaut	Soignies	Braine-le-Comte - Mons	N55 Enghien Soignies (28.523 inh.) N524 Neufvilles, Lens N55 Naast, Le Rœulx, Binche Casteau (3.099 inh.)	Tubize Brussels	Mons
(European Union) (Belgium) (Wallonia) WalloniaHainaut	Mons	Mons	Maisières (4.002 inh.) 23 (Soignies) E19, E42 Tournai, Saint-Ghislain, Brussels, La Louvière, Charleroi, Liège, France (Valenciennes, Lille, Paris) N56 Jurbise, Lens, Ath N552 Obourg, Bustiau Canal du Centre Nimy (4.663 inh.) R50, Mons inner ring road Mons, Saint-Ghislain, Tournai, Quaregnon, Quévy, Chimay, Binche, Charleroi, La LouvièreAth, Brussels, France (Valenciennes, Maubeuge) Interruption by R50 (Mons inner ring road) with junctions to N50 (Tournai), N51 (France (Valenciennes)), N554 (Cuesmes), N90 (Charleroi) R50, Mons inner ring road Mons, Saint-Ghislain, Tournai, Quaregnon, Quévy, Chimay, Binche, Charleroi, La Louvière, Ath, Brussels France (Valenciennes, Maubeuge) Hyon (4.028 inh.) N544 Cuesmes, Frameries N543 Ciply, Genly, Rieu-de-Bury Ciply (764 inh.) Nouvelles (311 inh.)	Soignies Brussels	France (Maubeuge)
(European Union) (Belgium) (Wallonia) WalloniaHainaut	Quévy	Mons - Quévy	4 R5, Mons outer ring road Mons, Frameries, Saint-Ghislain, Tournai (E42), Charleroi (E42), Brussels (E19), France (Valenciennes) (E19) Asquillies (439 inh.) N546 Givry, Frameries, Colfontaine N563 Havay, Givry, Estinnes, Binche	Mons	France (Maubeuge)
(European Union) (France) (Hauts-de-France)	Continuation by N2 towards Maubeuge				
