= N7 road (Belgium) =

Road in Belgium

National Route 7
- Dutch: Nationale Weg 7 French: Route nationale 7

Route information
- Length: 78.8 km (49.0 mi)

Major junctions
- From: Halle
- To: Tournai

Location
- Country: Belgium
- Major cities: Halle, Ath, Tournai

Highway system
- Highways of Belgium; Motorways; National Roads

The N7 is a national route in Belgium that connects Halle, just southwest of Brussels, with Tournai and the border with France.

The road is one of the 9 major national routes in Belgium, but the only one that does not start in Brussels. The start of the N7 is at an intersection with the N6 in the Flemish city Halle, 19 km (12 mi) southeast of Brussels. The route starts running west and crosses the E429 highway before entering Wallonia. The route goes to the city of Enghien where it crosses the E429 highway again. The N7 goes southwest and continue straight to the midsized city Ath in central Hainaut Province. After passing Leuze-en-Hainaut and the E42 highway, the N7 reaches the major city and border town Tournai. The road ends at the French border near the village of Hertain where it continues as the D941 to Lille.

The N7 crosses 8 municipalities. 1 in Flemish Brabant, 2 in Walloon Brabant and 7 in Hainaut. A full list of municipalities can be found below. Major municipalities are in bold.

Regions	Province	Municipality	Population	Length of N7 (km)
Flanders	Flemish Brabant	**Halle**	41284	4.2
Wallonia	Walloon Brabant	Tubize	27774	2.4
Wallonia	Walloon Brabant	Rebecq	10977	3.6
Wallonia	Hainaut	**Enghien**	14233	10.7
Wallonia	Hainaut	Silly	8415	5.6
Wallonia	Hainaut	**Ath**	29630	14.9
Wallonia	Hainaut	Leuze-en-Hainaut	13998	10.8
Wallonia	Hainaut	**Tournai**	65518	20.9

== Junction list ==
Province	Municipality	Section	Junction	Eastbound destinations	Westbound destinations
(European Union) (Belgium) Flanders Flemish Brabant	Halle	Halle	Halle (41.284 inh.) N6, N28 Halle, Brussels, Sint-Pieters-Leeuw, Pepingen, Ninove, Tubize, Mons, Nivelles 22 (Halle) E429 Enghien, Ath, Tournai, Brussels (R0), Nivelles (E19), France (Lille) Lembeek (7.905 inh.) Hondzocht (771 inh.) N224 Tubize	Brussels	Enghien Ath Tournai
(European Union) (Belgium) Wallonia Walloon Brabant	Tubize	Tubize - Rebecq	Saintes (2.799 inh.)	Halle Brussels	Enghien Ath Tournai
(European Union) (Belgium) Wallonia Walloon Brabant	Rebecq	Tubize - Rebecq	Bierghes (1.990 inh.)	Halle Brussels	Enghien Ath Tournai
(European Union) (Belgium) Wallonia Hainaut	Enghien	Enghien - Ath	Petit-Enghien (6.818 inh.) N285 Coquiane, Gooik, Ternat, Asse, Hove, Soignies Enghien (14.233 inh.) N255 Herne, Ninove, Geraardsbergen N55 Hove, Soignies, La Louvière Marcq (3.388 inh.) 27 (Marcq-Mark) E429 Halle, Ath, Tournai, Brussels (R0), France (Lille)	Halle Brussels	Ath Tournai
(European Union) (Belgium) Wallonia Hainaut	Silly	Enghien - Ath	Bassilly (2.250 inh.) N263 Bassilly, Bever, Geraardsbergen	Halle Brussels	Ath Tournai
(European Union) (Belgium) Wallonia Hainaut	Ath	Ath	N57 Silly, Soignies, La Louvière Ghislenghien (856 inh.) N57, N525 Lessines, Ronse, Geraardsbergen, Chièvres, Brugelette Meslin-l'Évêque (1.638 inh.) N7a Ath-Centre Ath (29.630 inh.) N56 Lessines, Ronse, Geraardsbergen, Chièvres, Lens, Mons N528 Ath-Centre, Mainvault, Frasnes-lez-Anvaing N7a Ath-Centre Villers-Saint-Amand (648 inh.) Ligne (888 inh.)	Enghien Brussels	Tournai France (Lille)
(European Union) (Belgium) Wallonia Hainaut	Leuze-en-Hainaut	Ath - Tournai	Chapelle-à-Wattines (938 inh.) N60d Tourpes, Péruwelz, France (Valenciennes) N526 Tourpes, Beloeil Leuze-en-Hainaut (13998 inh.) N60 Leuze-Centre, Frasnes-lez-Anvaing, Ronse, Ghent, Péruwelz, France (Valenciennes)	Ath Brussels	Tournai France (Lille)
(European Union) (Belgium) Wallonia Hainaut	Tournai	Tournai	Barry (1.690 inh.) N50 Péruwelz, Saint-Ghislain, Mons Gaurain-Ramecroix (3.575 inh.) N52 Antoing, Brunehaut, France (Valenciennes) N501 Vaulx, Antoing 32 (Tournai-Vaulx) E42 Tournai, Saint-Ghislain, Mons, Charleroi, Ath (E429), Brussels (E429), Kortrijk (E403), France (Lille, Paris) Warchin (1.455 inh.) R52, Tournai ring road Frasnes-lez-Anvaing (N529), Ronse (N48), Pecq (N50), Kortrijk (N50), Rumes (N508), Brunehaut (N507), Antoing (N500) Tournai (68.518 inh.) R52, Tournai ring road Frasnes-lez-Anvaing (N529), Ronse (N48), Pecq (N50), Kortrijk (N50), Rumes (N508), Brunehaut (N507), Antoing (N500) Orcq (1.200 inh.) Marquain (820 inh.) 35 (Marquain) E42 Tournai, Saint-Ghislain, Mons, Charleroi, Ath (E429), Brussels (E429), Kortrijk (E403), France (Lille, Paris) Hertain (196 inh.)	Ath Brussels	France (Villeneuve-d'Ascq, Lille)
(European Union) (France) (Hauts-de-France)	Continuation by D941 towards Villeneuve-d'Ascq, Lille and Paris.				
