= List of protected heritage sites in Braine-le-Comte =

This table shows an overview of the protected heritage sites in the Walloon town Braine-le-Comte. This list is part of Belgium's national heritage.

Object	Year/architect	Town/section	Address	Coordinates	Number^{?}	Image
Forest "Bois de la Houssière" ^{(nl)} ^{(fr)}		's Gravenbrakel		50.620777°N 4.175633°E	55004-CLT-0001-01 Info	
4 prehistoric tombs ^{(nl)} ^{(fr)}		's Gravenbrakel		50.620270°N 4.198845°E	55004-CLT-0002-01 Info	
Old church of the Dominicans ^{(nl)} ^{(fr)}		's Gravenbrakel		50.609854°N 4.135386°E	55004-CLT-0003-01 Info	Oude kerk van de Dominicanen
Church of Saint-Gery ^{(nl)} ^{(fr)}		's Gravenbrakel		50.612904°N 4.137078°E	55004-CLT-0004-01 Info	Kerk Saint-Géry
Old Town Hall, also known as the Hotel d'Arne Berg called main front facade and roof ^{(nl)} ^{(fr)}		's Gravenbrakel		50.610609°N 4.136668°E	55004-CLT-0005-01 Info	Oude raadhuis, ook wel Hôtel d'Arnenberg genoemd: hoofdgevel en voorzijde dak
Castle of Salmon Sart and surroundings ^{(nl)} ^{(fr)}		's Gravenbrakel	chaussée de Mons n° 128-130	50.592154°N 4.098273°E	55004-CLT-0006-01 Info	Kasteel van Salmonsart en omgeving
The remains of the ancient ramparts of the town of Braine-le-Comte, namely the three semicircular towers rose Larcee and another semicircular tower located in "rue des Fosses-Bass" ^{(nl)} ^{(fr)}		's Gravenbrakel		50.610186°N 4.138524°E	55004-CLT-0007-01 Info	
Ensemble of the church Saint-Géry and surrounding wall ^{(nl)} ^{(fr)}		Ronquieres 's Gravenbrakel		50.608888°N 4.221401°E	55004-CLT-0010-01 Info	Ensemble van de kerk Saint-Géry en omliggende muur
St. Martin's Church ^{(nl)} ^{(fr)}		Steenkerke 's Gravenbrakel		50.642623°N 4.069092°E	55004-CLT-0012-01 Info	Kerk Saint-Martin
Former convent of the Dominicans: facades and roofs and the ensemble of these buildings and the environment ^{(nl)} ^{(fr)}		's Gravenbrakel		50.609534°N 4.135661°E	55004-CLT-0013-01 Info	Voormalig klooster van de Dominicanen: gevels en daken en het ensemble van deze gebouwen en de omgeving
Station: facades and roofs and row of trees ^{(nl)} ^{(fr)}		's Gravenbrakel	Place René Branquart	50.605759°N 4.138225°E	55004-CLT-0014-01 Info	
Kiosk Grand 'Place ^{(nl)} ^{(fr)}		's Gravenbrakel	Grand' Place	50.610592°N 4.135913°E	55004-CLT-0016-01 Info	Kiosk Grand' Place
Chapel Notre-Dame du Refuge ^{(nl)} ^{(fr)}		's Gravenbrakel	rue de Turenne, n° 1 (M) et alentours (S)	50.637038°N 4.069139°E	55004-CLT-0017-01 Info	
Chapel Notre-Dame de Grâce and environment ^{(nl)} ^{(fr)}		's Gravenbrakel		50.598462°N 4.189981°E	55004-CLT-0018-01 Info	
Facade, roof and machinery of the mill called "Moulin de Cambron et d'Arenberg" environment and the river at the rear of the building ^{(nl)} ^{(fr)}		's Gravenbrakel		50.608047°N 4.220996°E	55004-CLT-0019-01 Info	Gevel, het dak en machinerie van de watermolen genaamd "Moulin de Cambron et d'Arenberg", omgeving en bij de rivier aan de achterzijde van het gebouw
Entire facade and roof, including the chassis, woodwork, ironwork of the house "Art Nouveau" ^{(nl)} ^{(fr)}		's Gravenbrakel	Rue Neuman n°51	50.609937°N 4.139545°E	55004-CLT-0020-01 Info	
Chapel of Bon Dieu de Pitie and the rock of Chenu ^{(nl)} ^{(fr)}		's Gravenbrakel		50.608178°N 4.225981°E	55004-CLT-0021-01 Info	
The disused clay pit in one place "le Grand Bois" ^{(nl)} ^{(fr)}		's Gravenbrakel	Hennuyères	50.650966°N 4.190814°E	55004-CLT-0022-01 Info	
Sand quarry of Planois (extending woods of la Houssière) ^{(nl)} ^{(fr)}		Hennuyères 's Gravenbrakel		50.629466°N 4.184786°E	55004-CLT-0023-01 Info	
Entire facade and roof, including the chassis, woodwork, ironwork of the house "Art Nouveau" ^{(nl)} ^{(fr)}		's Gravenbrakel	Rue Neuman n°53	50.609979°N 4.139622°E	55004-CLT-0024-01 Info	
Entire facade and roof, including the chassis, woodwork, ironwork of the house "Art Nouveau" ^{(nl)} ^{(fr)}		's Gravenbrakel	Rue Neuman n°55	50.610010°N 4.139684°E	55004-CLT-0025-01 Info	
Entire facade and roof, including the chassis, woodwork, ironwork of the house "Art Nouveau" ^{(nl)} ^{(fr)}		's Gravenbrakel	Rue Neuman n°57	50.610053°N 4.139747°E	55004-CLT-0026-01 Info	
Entire facade and roof, including the chassis, woodwork, ironwork of the house "Art Nouveau" ^{(nl)} ^{(fr)}		's Gravenbrakel	Rue Neuman n°59	50.610088°N 4.139804°E	55004-CLT-0027-01 Info	
Entire facade and roof, including the chassis, woodwork, ironwork of the house "Art Nouveau" ^{(nl)} ^{(fr)}		's Gravenbrakel	Rue Neuman n°61	50.610117°N 4.139864°E	55004-CLT-0028-01 Info	
Entire facade and roof, including the chassis, woodwork, ironwork of the house "Art Nouveau" ^{(nl)} ^{(fr)}		's Gravenbrakel	Rue Neuman n°63	50.610152°N 4.139932°E	55004-CLT-0029-01 Info	

== See also ==
- List of protected heritage sites in Hainaut (province)
- Braine-le-Comte
