= Uwilingiyimana =

Uwilingiyimana is a Rwandan surname. Persons with this surname include:

- Agathe Uwilingiyimana (1953–1994), prime minister of Rwanda 1993–1994, Rwanda's first and so far only female prime minister
- Juvénal Uwilingiyimana (1951–2005), minister of commerce of Rwanda, minister of trade of Rwanda
