= List of protected heritage sites in Rebecq =

This table shows an overview of the protected heritage sites in the Walloon town Rebecq. This list is part of Belgium's national heritage.

Object	Year/architect	Town/section	Address	Coordinates	Number^{?}	Image
Some parts of the hospital, namely the barn, chapel, facades and roofs of the house of the chaplain, the old wing and the seventeenth-century building in front of the chapel in Rebecq-Rognon ^{(nl)} ^{(fr)}		Rebecq		50.662910°N 4.133057°E	25123-CLT-0001-01 Info	Sommige delen van het ziekenhuis, namelijk de schuur, kapel, gevels en daken van het huis van de kapelaan, de oude vleugel en de zeventiende-eeuwse gebouw in de voorkant van de kapel in Rebecq-Rognon
Organs of the church of Saint-Martin in Quenast ^{(nl)} ^{(fr)}		Rebecq		50.671946°N 4.156458°E	25123-CLT-0003-01 Info	
The two mills of Aremberg Rebecq-Rognon, their machines and valves and the ensemble formed by the two mills and the surrounding land ^{(nl)} ^{(fr)}		Rebecq		50.663439°N 4.131696°E	25123-CLT-0004-01 Info	De twee molens van Aremberg in Rebecq-Rognon, hun machines en kleppen en het ensemble gevormd door de twee molens en het omringende land
The rectory of Bierghes (including the workshop and kiln wall) and the ensemble of the Church of Saint Martin, graveyard, rectory, the farm, and driveway ^{(nl)} ^{(fr)}		Rebecq		50.701630°N 4.144900°E	25123-CLT-0005-01 Info	
Facades and roof of the building on Grand Place No. 2 in Rebecq, including the landing and cobbled sidewalk ^{(nl)} ^{(fr)}		Rebecq		50.664870°N 4.131564°E	25123-CLT-0006-01 Info	Gevels en dak van gebouw aan Grand Place n°2 te Rebecq, inclusief het bordes en troittoir in kleine blokken
Arenberg Castle, with the farm and the old mill, the ensemble of buildings and grounds in the area, forming a protection zone ^{(nl)} ^{(fr)}		Rebecq		50.686309°N 4.129520°E	25123-CLT-0009-01 Info	
The walls and roof of the building in Grand Place No. 3 in Rebecq and the steps and cobbled sidewalk ^{(nl)} ^{(fr)}		Rebecq		50.664940°N 4.131615°E	25123-CLT-0010-01 Info	De gevels en dak van het gebouw te Grand Place n°3 te Rebecq en het bordes en de stoep in kleine blokken

== See also ==
- Lists of protected heritage sites in Walloon Brabant
- Rebecq
