= List of protected heritage sites in Silly, Belgium =

This table shows an overview of the protected heritage sites in the Walloon town Opzullik, or Silly, Belgium. This list is part of Belgium's national heritage.

Object	Year/architect	Town/section	Address	Coordinates	Number^{?}	Image
Valley on the southwest edge of the forest Cambron at a place called "L'Ermitage" ^{(nl)} ^{(fr)}		Opzullik	Silly	50.621160°N 3.962099°E	55039-CLT-0002-01 Info	
The oldest parts, namely the ship, the nave and the tower of the church of Bassilly and the ensemble of this church, the cemetery, the avenue of lime trees and the enclosing wall ^{(nl)} ^{(fr)}		Opzullik		50.672705°N 3.936459°E	55039-CLT-0003-01 Info	
Church of Saint-Amand ^{(nl)} ^{(fr)}		Opzullik	Hellebecq	50.663181°N 3.889000°E	55039-CLT-0004-01 Info	Kerk Saint-Amand
the church of St. Maurice ^{(nl)} ^{(fr)}		Opzullik	Hoves	50.670622°N 4.035146°E	55039-CLT-0005-01 Info	Kerk Saint-Martin
Site formed by the church of Saint-Maurice, the cemetery and the old wall that surrounds this ^{(nl)} ^{(fr)}		Opzullik	Hoves	50.670280°N 4.034588°E	55039-CLT-0006-01 Info	Site gevormd door de kerk Saint-Maurice, het kerkhof en de oude muur die deze omringt
The motte located near the castle and the church of Silly ^{(nl)} ^{(fr)}		Opzullik		50.670716°N 4.034790°E	55039-CLT-0007-01 Info	
The facade and roof of the castle of Thoricourt, outbuildings and orangerie, interior and exterior of the chapel, the pillory (M) and the ensemble of the castle and surrounding park ^{(nl)} ^{(fr)}		Opzullik		50.617151°N 3.952994°E	55039-CLT-0008-01 Info	De gevel en daken van het kasteel van Thoricourt, bijgebouwen en de oranjerie, interieur en exterieur van de kapel, de schandpaal (M) en het ensemble van het kasteel en de omliggende park
Tower of the castle of Launois ^{(nl)} ^{(fr)}		Opzullik	Silly	50.614259°N 3.959369°E	55039-CLT-0010-01 Info	
The old buildings at the entrance to the grounds of the castle of Enghien, including the old stables, pavilion Edward, the door of the slaves, the chapel and the pavilion called "Pavillon des Sept Etoiles" and the ensemble of the castle, the outbuildings and the adjacent land ^{(nl)} ^{(fr)}		Opzullik		50.692184°N 4.040844°E	55039-CLT-0013-01 Info	
The Pavillon des Sept Etoiles and the park of Arenberg castle, except the golf course ^{(nl)} ^{(fr)}		Opzullik		50.687656°N 4.047325°E	55039-PEX-0001-01 Info	

== See also ==
- List of protected heritage sites in Hainaut (province)
- Silly, Belgium
