= List of protected heritage sites in Saint-Ghislain =

This table shows an overview of the protected heritage sites in the Walloon town Saint-Ghislain. This list is part of Belgium's national heritage.

Object	Year/architect	Town/section	Address	Coordinates	Number^{?}	Image
Old Town Hall and exterior parts of the hall ^{(nl)} ^{(fr)}		Saint-Ghislain	Grand-Place n°s27-28	50.448204°N 3.819457°E	53070-CLT-0001-01 Info	Oud stadhuis en hal (delen exterieur)
Church of Saint-Gery de Baudour, excepting the two 1870 bays ^{(nl)} ^{(fr)}		Saint-Ghislain		50.484549°N 3.833823°E	53070-CLT-0003-01 Info	Kerk Saint-Géry de Baudour, uitgzonderd de twee traveeën van 1870
Ruins of the old mill Prévôté, existing main building and outbuildings and the surrounding area (park, lake, countryside) ^{(nl)} ^{(fr)}		Saint-Ghislain		50.502002°N 3.778748°E	53070-CLT-0007-01 Info	
rectory ^{(nl)} ^{(fr)}		Saint-Ghislain	Place n°7	50.486241°N 3.791692°E	53070-CLT-0008-01 Info	
Train station and outbuildings (freight depot and toilets) facades and roofs, two former waiting rooms, wooden ceilings and external grilles ^{(nl)} ^{(fr)}		Saint-Ghislain	rue Albert-Elisabeth, n°1A	50.442780°N 3.819258°E	53070-CLT-0011-01 Info	Station en bijgebouwen (schuur met goederen en sanitair) gevels en daken, twee voormalige wachtkamers, houten plafonds en externe roosters
Presbytery of the Church of Saint-Gery in Baudour ^{(nl)} ^{(fr)}		Saint-Ghislain		50.484549°N 3.833823°E	53070-CLT-0012-01 Info	
Bakehouse of the church Saint-Gery, in Baudour ^{(nl)} ^{(fr)}		Saint-Ghislain		50.484626°N 3.833570°E	53070-CLT-0013-01 Info	

== See also ==
- List of protected heritage sites in Hainaut (province)
- Saint-Ghislain
