= Ronquières =

Village in Wallonia, Belgium

Coordinates: 50.6087°N 4.22103°E

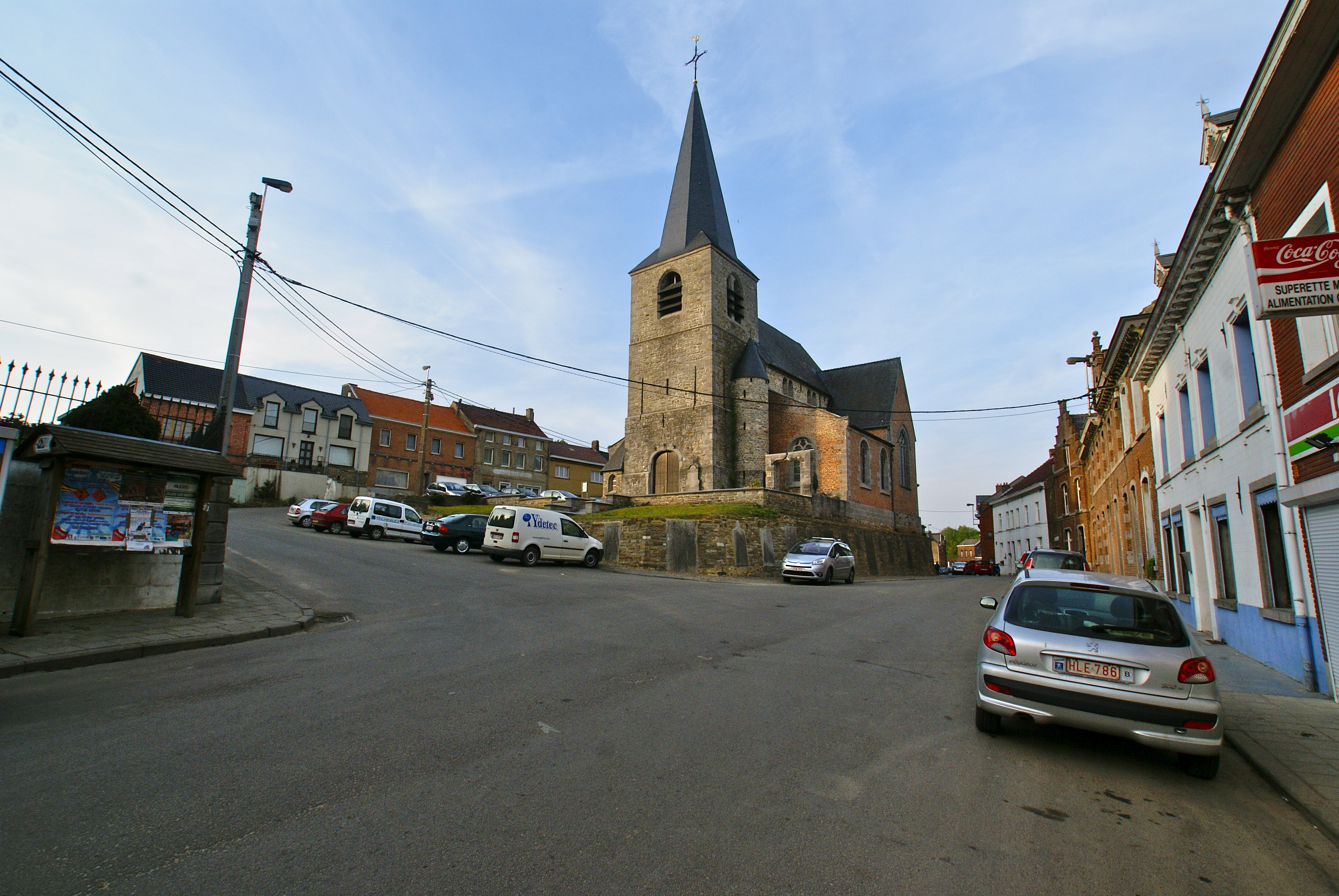
Centre of Ronquières

Ronquières (French pronunciation: [ʁɔ̃kjɛʁ]; Walloon: Ronkière) is a village of Wallonia and a district of the municipality of Braine-le-Comte, located in the province of Hainaut, Belgium.

It is best known as the location of the Ronquières inclined plane on the Brussels-Charleroi Canal. The lower end of the inclined plane is just a few hundred metres from the centre of the village.

The population of the village was 1370 as of January 2006.
