= Ronquières Inclined Plane =

Inclined canal in Wallonia, Belgium

Coordinates: 50.597786°N 4.221582°E

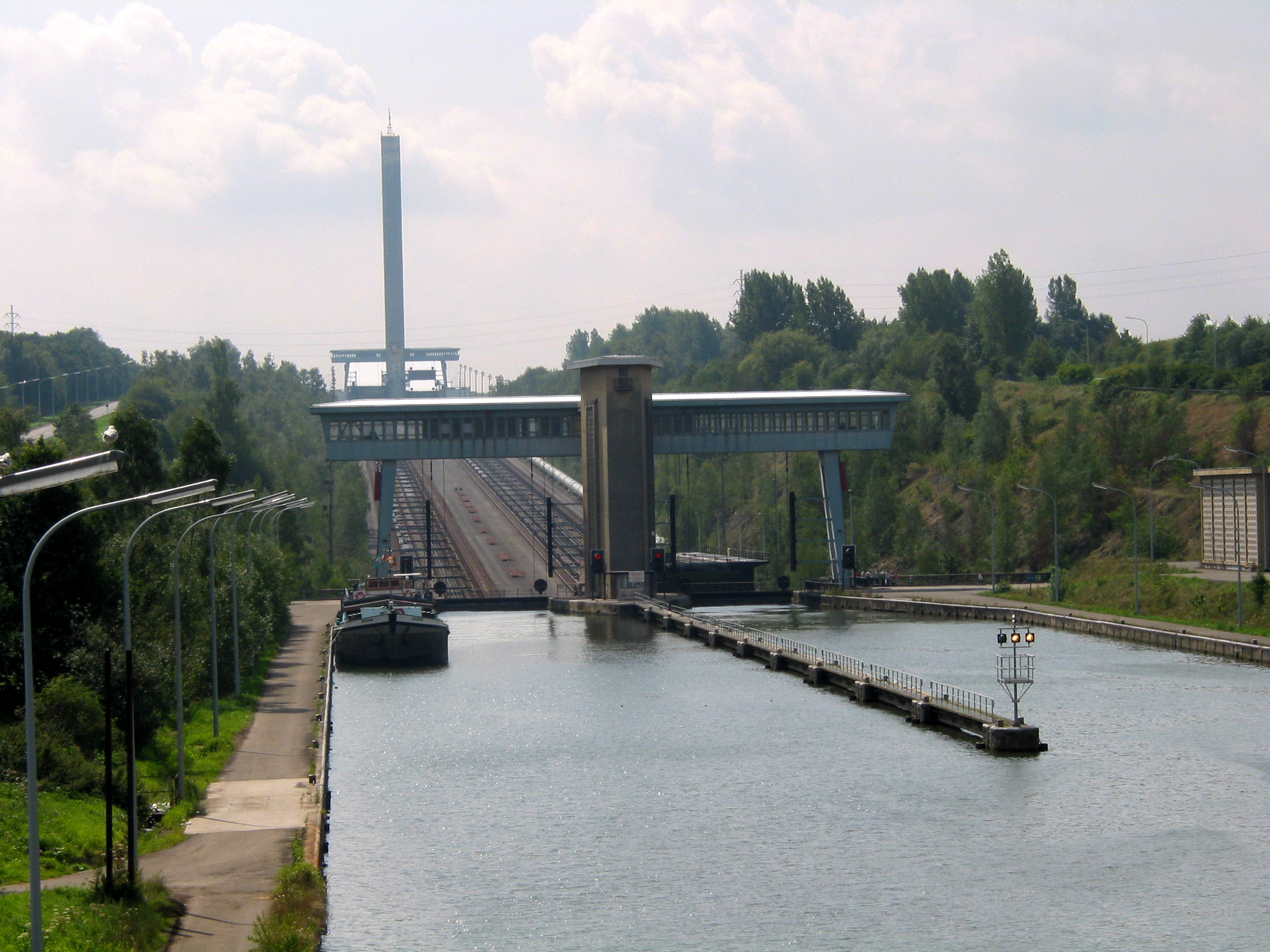
The inclined plane

The Ronquières Inclined Plane is a canal inclined plane on the Brussels-Charleroi Canal in the province of Hainaut in Wallonia, Belgium. It opened in April 1968 having taken six years to build. It is in the municipality of Braine-le-Comte and takes its name from the nearby village of Ronquières.

The plane was built to reduce the delays imposed by the 14 locks (already reduced from 16 in the 19th century) that had hitherto been needed for the canal to follow the local topography.

== By visiting this place ==
The top of the tower offers a wide view over Nivelles and beyond (as far north as Brussels, the Atomium, the King Baudouin Stadium, the Koekelberg Basilica on a clear day).

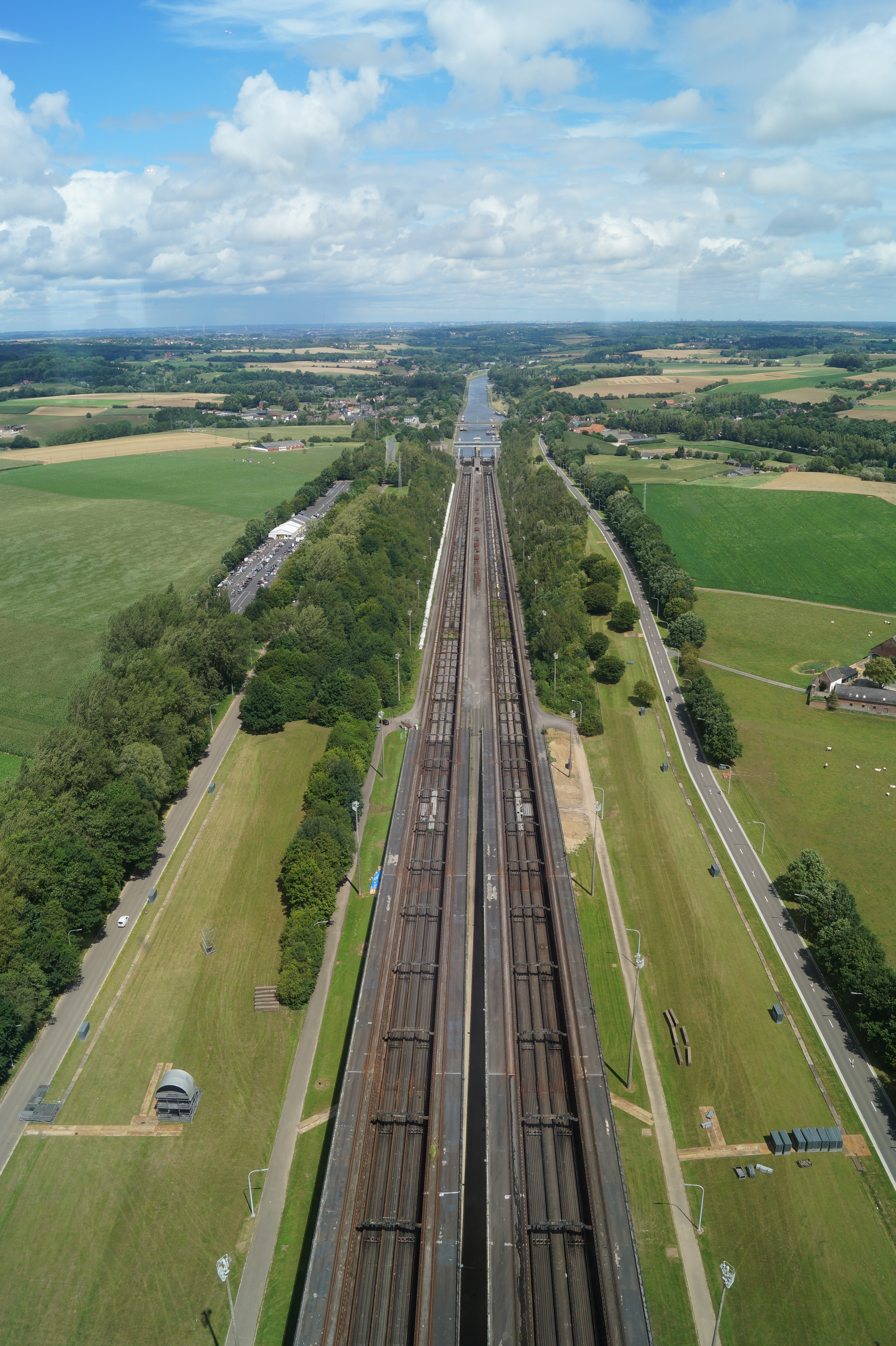
The panoramic view from Ronquières inclined plane

== Description ==
The Ronquières Inclined Plane is 1,432 metres (4,698 ft) long and lifts boats vertically through 67.73 metres (222.2 ft). It consists of two large caissons mounted on rails. Each caisson measures 91 metres (299 ft) long by 12 metres (39 ft) wide and has a water depth between 3 and 3.70 metres (9.8 and 12.1 ft). It can carry one boat of 1,350 tonnes or many smaller boats within the same limits.

Each caisson has a 5,200-tonne counterweight running in the trough below the rails, which permits the caisson to be moved independently of the other. Each caisson is pulled by eight cables wound by capstans at the top end of the inclined plane. Each cable is 1,480 metres (4,860 ft) long. Each caisson can be moved between the two canal levels at a speed of 1.2 metres per second (3.9 ft/s), taking about 22 minutes. It takes 50 minutes in total to pass through the 1,800 metres (5,900 ft) of the entire structure, including the raised canal bridge at the top end.

== In popular culture ==
- The film Brussels by Night (1983) takes place (in part) at the inclined plane of Ronquières.

== Photo gallery ==
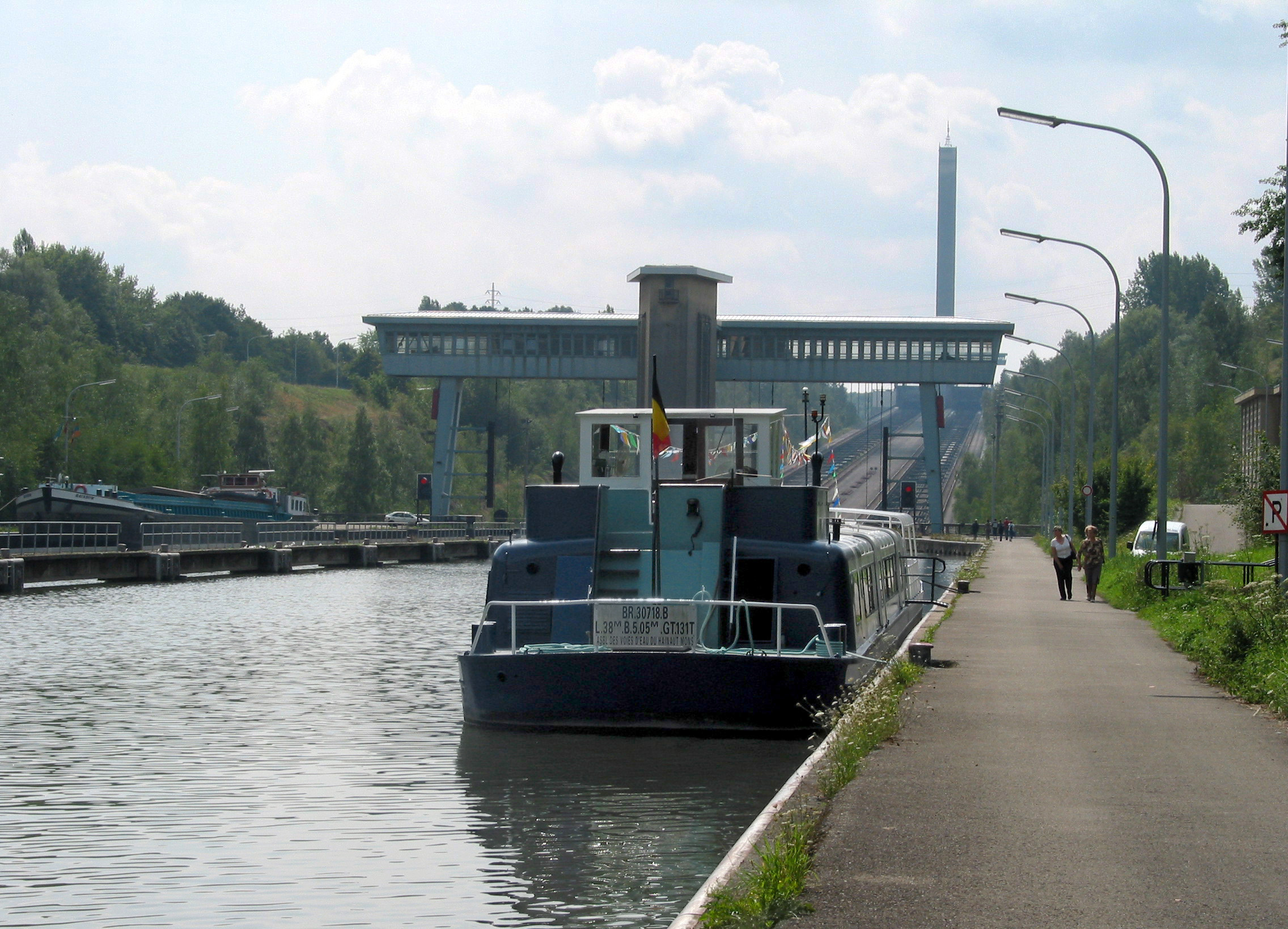
Boat waiting before the inclined plane

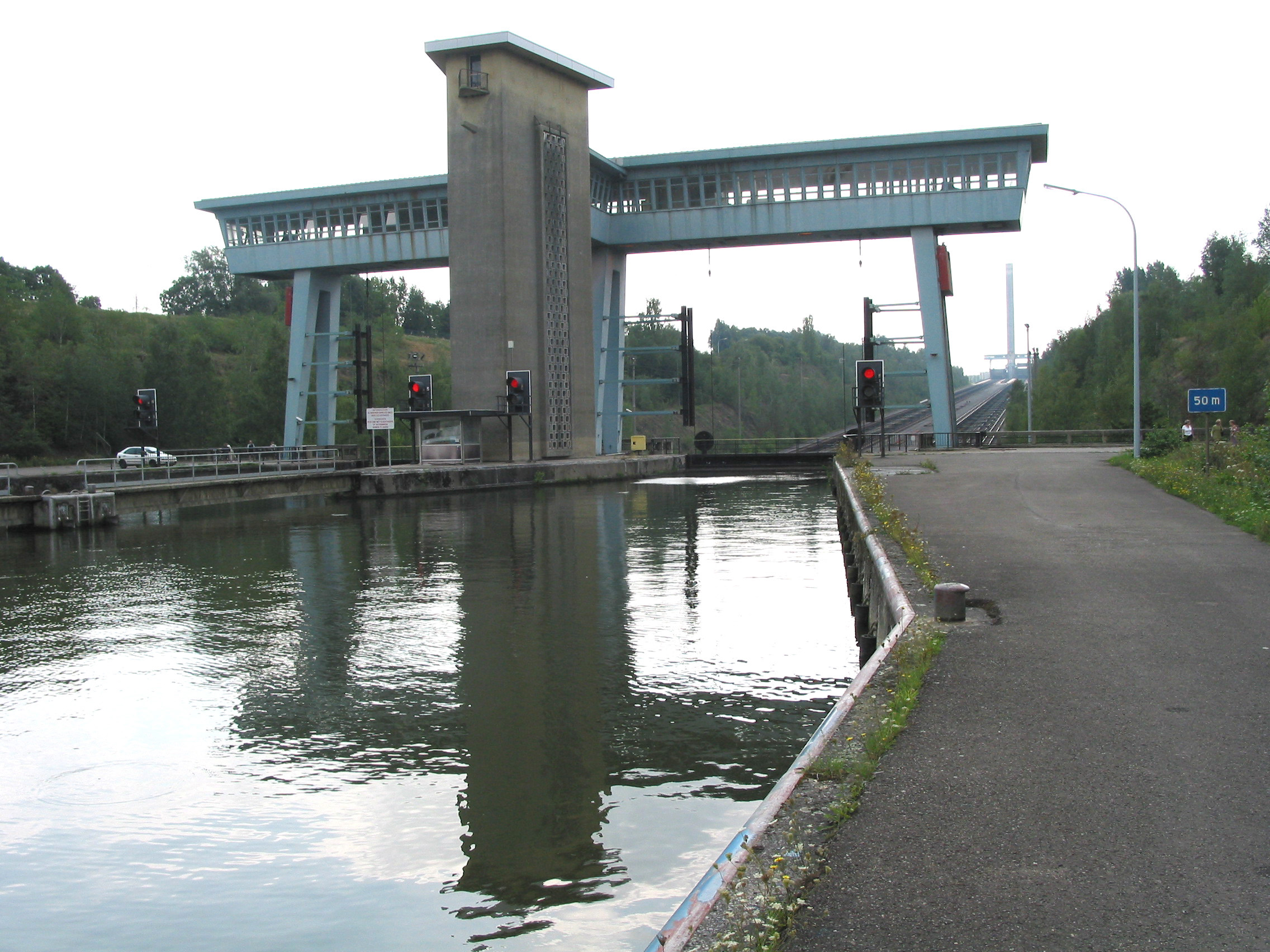
Lower control tower and machine hall

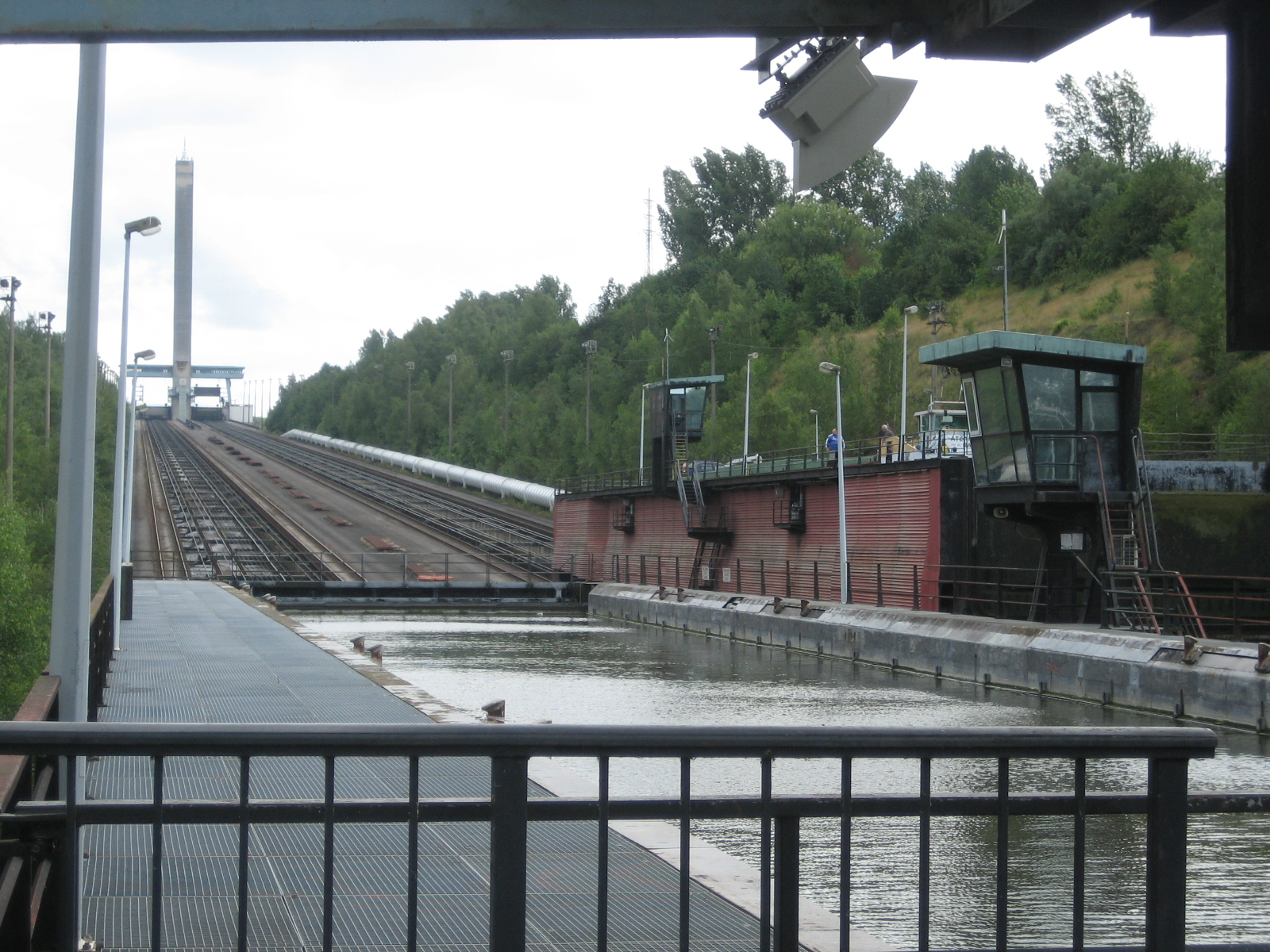
Caisson leaving lower lock

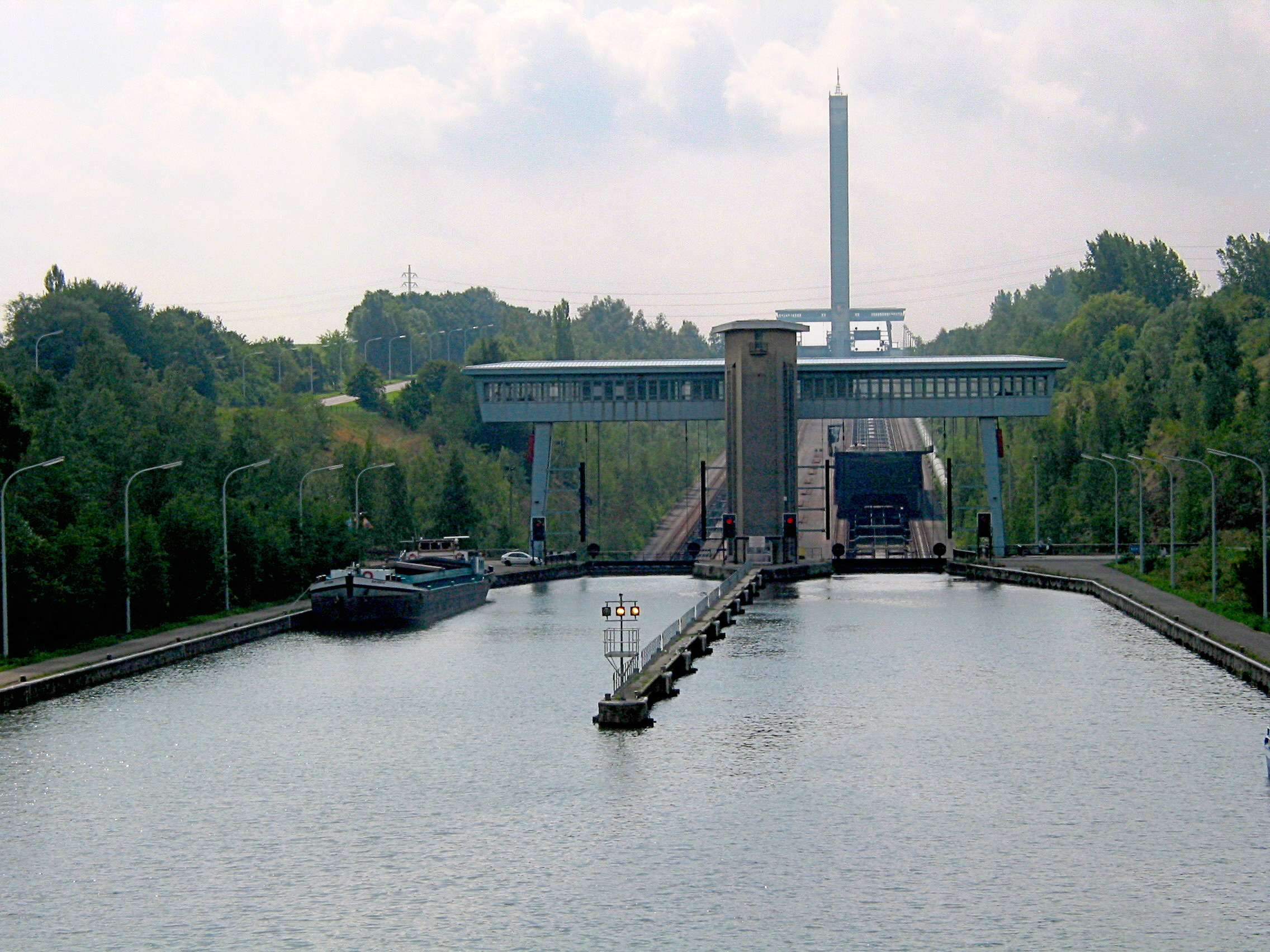
Caisson en route

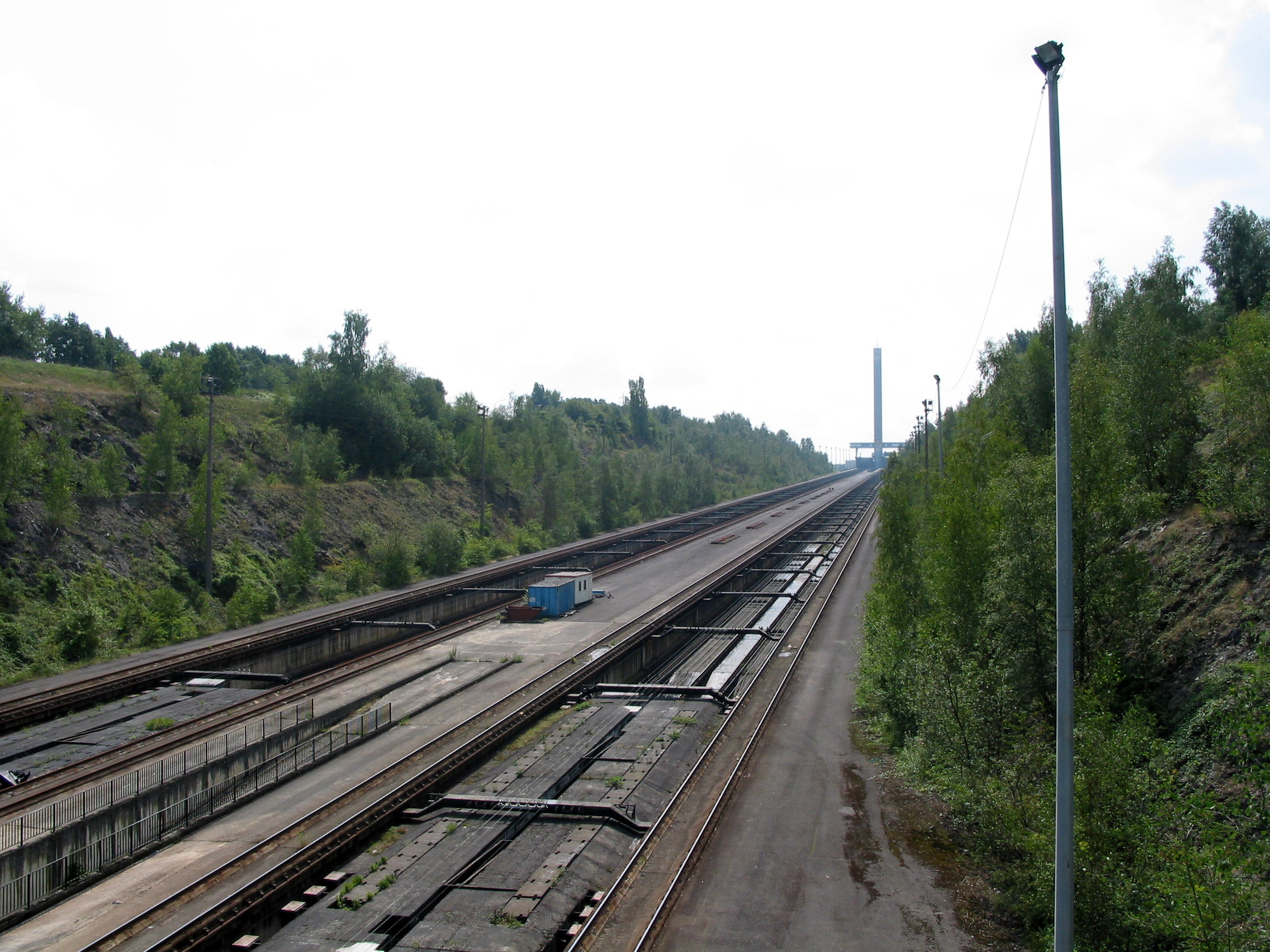
The inclined plane

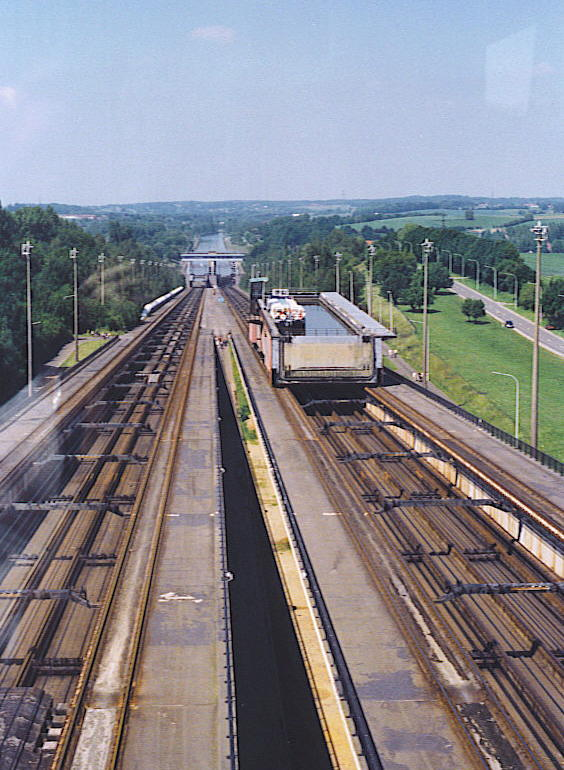
Caisson en route

== See also ==
- Strépy-Thieu boat lift
- Article on the French-language Wikipedia from which this article was translated
- Falkirk Wheel
