= Brussels Ring =

Large ring road of Brussels, Belgium

Ring R0
- Brussels Ring
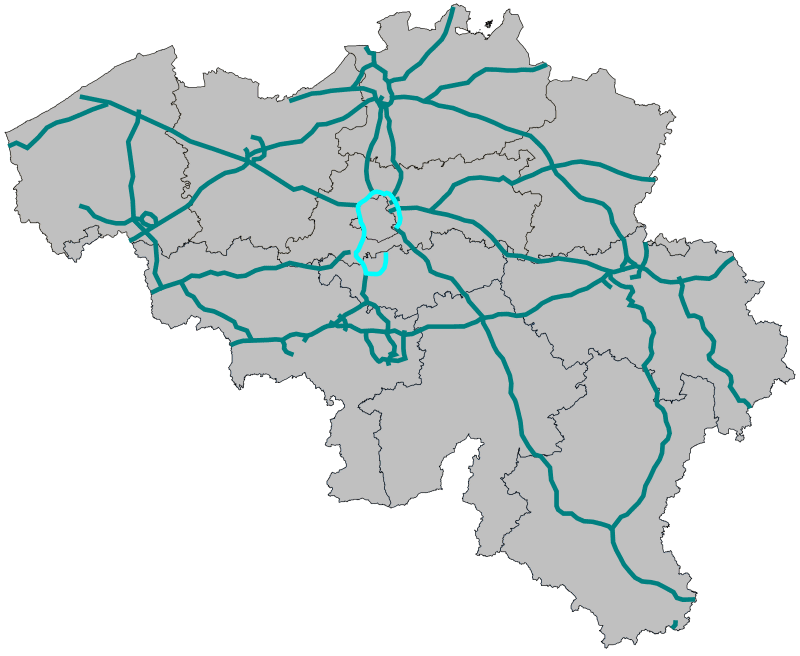

Route information
- Length: 76 km (47 mi)

Location
- Country: Belgium

Highway system
- Highways of Belgium; Motorways; National Roads

The Brussels Ring (Dutch: Brusselse Ring [ˈbrʏsəlsə ˈrɪŋ] or (Grote) Ring rond Brussel [ˈɣroːtə ˈrɪŋ rɔnd ˈbrʏsəl]; French: Ring de Bruxelles [ʁiŋ(ɡ) də bʁysɛl]), numbered R0, is a ring road surrounding the Brussels-Capital Region, as well as other smaller towns south of Brussels. It is about 75 kilometres (47 mi) long, with two or three lanes in each direction. While most of it is classified as a motorway (highway), part of it (in the Sonian Forest) is merely an express route. It crosses the three regions of Belgium: its main part (51.7 kilometres (32.1 mi)) is situated in Flanders, whereas Wallonia comprises 18.2 kilometres (11.3 mi) of the total stretch and 5.5 kilometres (3.4 mi) is on Brussels territory.

The clockwise carriageway is referred to as the inner ring (French: ring intérieur, Dutch: binnenring), while the anticlockwise carriageway is referred to as the outer ring (French: ring extérieur, Dutch: buitenring).

== History ==
The first sections of the road were built in the late 1950s, but the main part was built during the 1970s, with the end of construction in 1978. The Brussels Ring has interchanges with the European routes E40 (at the Groot-Bijgaarden and Sint-Stevens-Woluwe interchanges), E19 (at the Machelen and Ittre interchanges), E411 (at the Leonard crossroads), and E429 (at the Halle interchange). It also has interchanges with national highways A12 (at the Strombeek-Bever interchange) and A201 (at the Zaventem interchange).

== Course ==
The Strombeek-Bever interchange with the A12 is located in Grimbergen municipality. Going clockwise from there, the ring then crosses the municipalities of City of Brussels, Vilvoorde, Machelen, Zaventem, Kraainem, Wezembeek-Oppem, Tervuren, Auderghem/Oudergem, Watermael-Boitsfort/Watermaal-Bosvoorde, Hoeilaart, Waterloo, Braine-l'Alleud, Braine-le-Château, Halle, Beersel, Drogenbos, Forest/Vorst, Sint-Pieters-Leeuw, Anderlecht, Dilbeek, Asse and Wemmel. In all the ring crosses fifteen municipalities in Flanders, five in the Brussels Region, and three in Wallonia.

== Ramps ==
As well as having eight interchanges with other highways, the Brussels Ring has twenty-seven ramps (junctions), numbered counterclockwise from 1 to 27:

- Ramp 1, also known as Quatre Bras/Vier Armen, leads to Tervuren
- Ramp 2 leads to Wezembeek-Oppem, Kraainem and UCL Saint-Luc hospital
- Ramp 3, also known as Zaventem-Henneaulaan, leads to Diegem and Zaventem
- Ramp 4 leads to Diegem-Woluwelaan, Vilvoorde, Evere and Zaventem
- Ramp 5 leads to Machelen
- Ramp 6 leads to Koningslo-Vilvoorde
- Ramp 7 leads to Grimbergen
- Ramp 8 leads to Wemmel, Expo, Strombeek-Bever, Laeken, A12-Willebroek
- Ramp 9 leads to Jette, Brugmann hospital and Merchtem
- Ramp 10 leads to Zellik, Aalst, Brussels, N9-Asse
- Ramp 11 leads to Sint-Agatha-Berchem and Groot-Bijgaarden
- Ramp 12 leads to Dilbeek
- Ramp 13 leads to Dilbeek, N8-Ninove, Sint-Jans-Molenbeek
- Ramp 14 leads to Anderlecht and Moortebeek
- Ramp 15 leads to Anderlecht and Pede
- Ramp 16 leads to Anderlecht and Sint-Pieters-Leeuw
- Ramp 17 leads to Anderlecht-Industries and Brussels-Centre
- Ramp 18 leads to Ruisbroek, Drogenbos and Uccle-Stalle
- Ramp 19 leads to Lot and Beersel
- Ramp 20 leads to Huizingen and Alsemberg
- Ramp 21 leads to Halle and E429 Lille-Tournai
- Ramp 22 leads to Wauthier-Braine, Tubize and Waterloo
- Ramp 23 leads to Ophain and Braine-l'Alleud
- Ramp 24 leads to Nivelles, Lillois, Braine-l'Alleud and Parc de l'Alliance
- Ramp 25 leads to Genappe, Braine-l'Alleud
- Ramp 26 leads to Mont-Saint-Jean
- Ramp 27 leads to Waterloo-Centre
