= Braine-le-Comte =

City in Hainaut Province, Wallonia, Belgium

Braine-le-Comte Brinne-e-Hinnot (Walloon): 's-Gravenbrakel (Dutch)
- Municipality
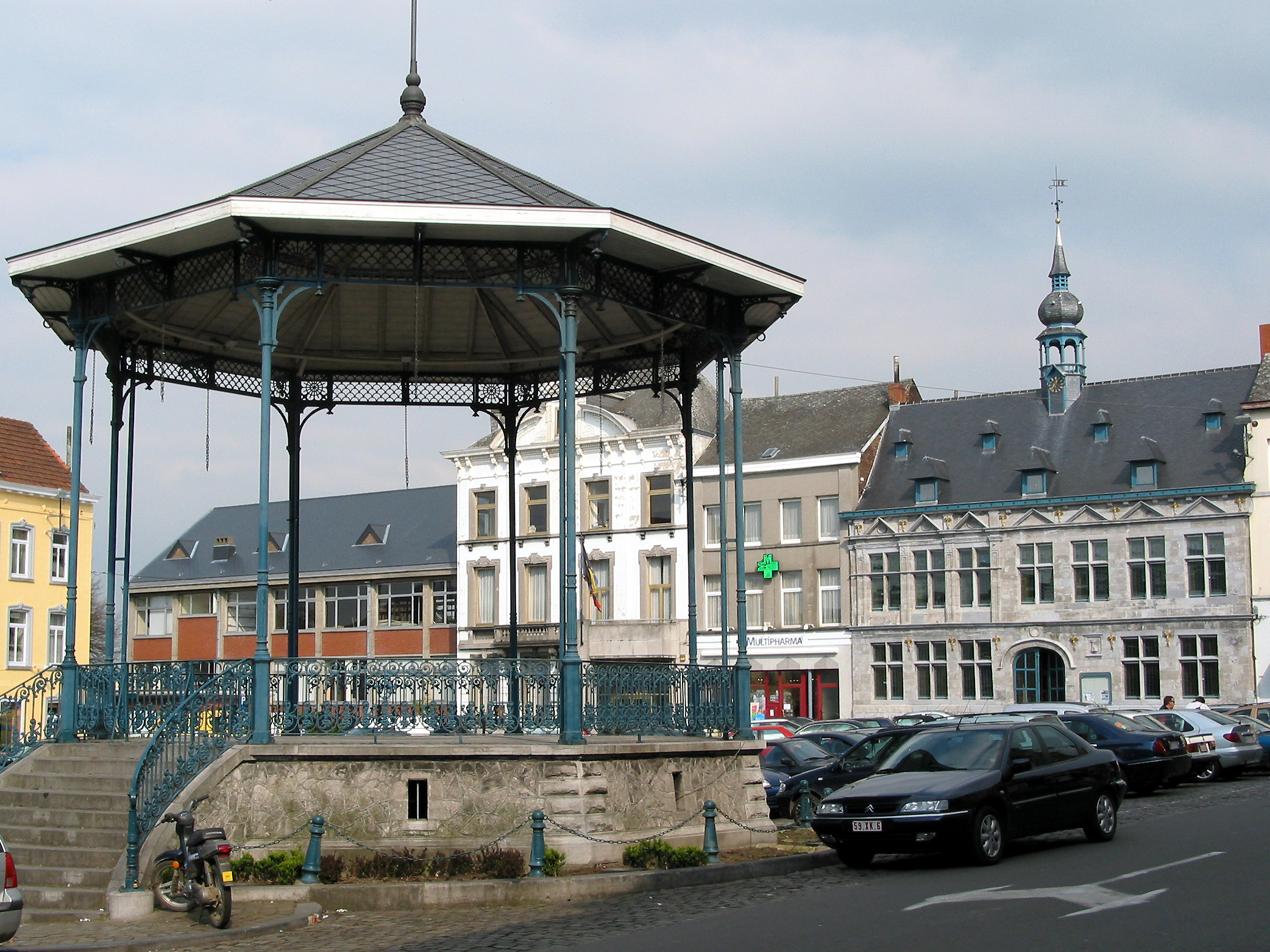
- The kiosk and Town Hall

- Flag Coat of arms

- Location of Braine-le-Comte in Hainaut
- Interactive map of Braine-le-Comte
- Location in Belgium
- Coordinates: 50°36′N 04°08′E
- Country: Belgium
- Community: French Community
- Region: Wallonia
- Province: Hainaut
- Arrondissement: Soignies

Government
  - Mayor: Maxime Daye (MR)
  - Governing parties: MR, PS

Area
  - Total: 84.87 km^{2} (32.77 sq mi)

Population (2023-01-01)
  - Total: 23,133
  - Density: 272.6/km^{2} (706.0/sq mi)
- Postal codes: 7090
- NIS code: 55004
- Area codes: 067
- Website: www.braine-le-comte.be

Braine-le-Comte (French: [bʁɛn lə kɔ̃t]; Walloon: Brinne-e-Hinnot; Dutch: 's-Gravenbrakel [ˈsxraːvə(m)ˌbraːkəl]) is a city and municipality of Wallonia located in the province of Hainaut, Belgium.

On January 1, 2018, Braine-le-Comte had a total population of 21,649. The total area is 84.68 square kilometres (32.70 sq mi) which gives a population density of 260 inhabitants per km^{2}.

The municipality consists of the following districts: Braine-le-Comte, Hennuyères, Henripont, Petit-Rœulx-lez-Braine, Ronquières, and Steenkerque.

The Ronquières inclined plane at the Brussels–Charleroi Canal is in the municipality of Braine-le-Comte.

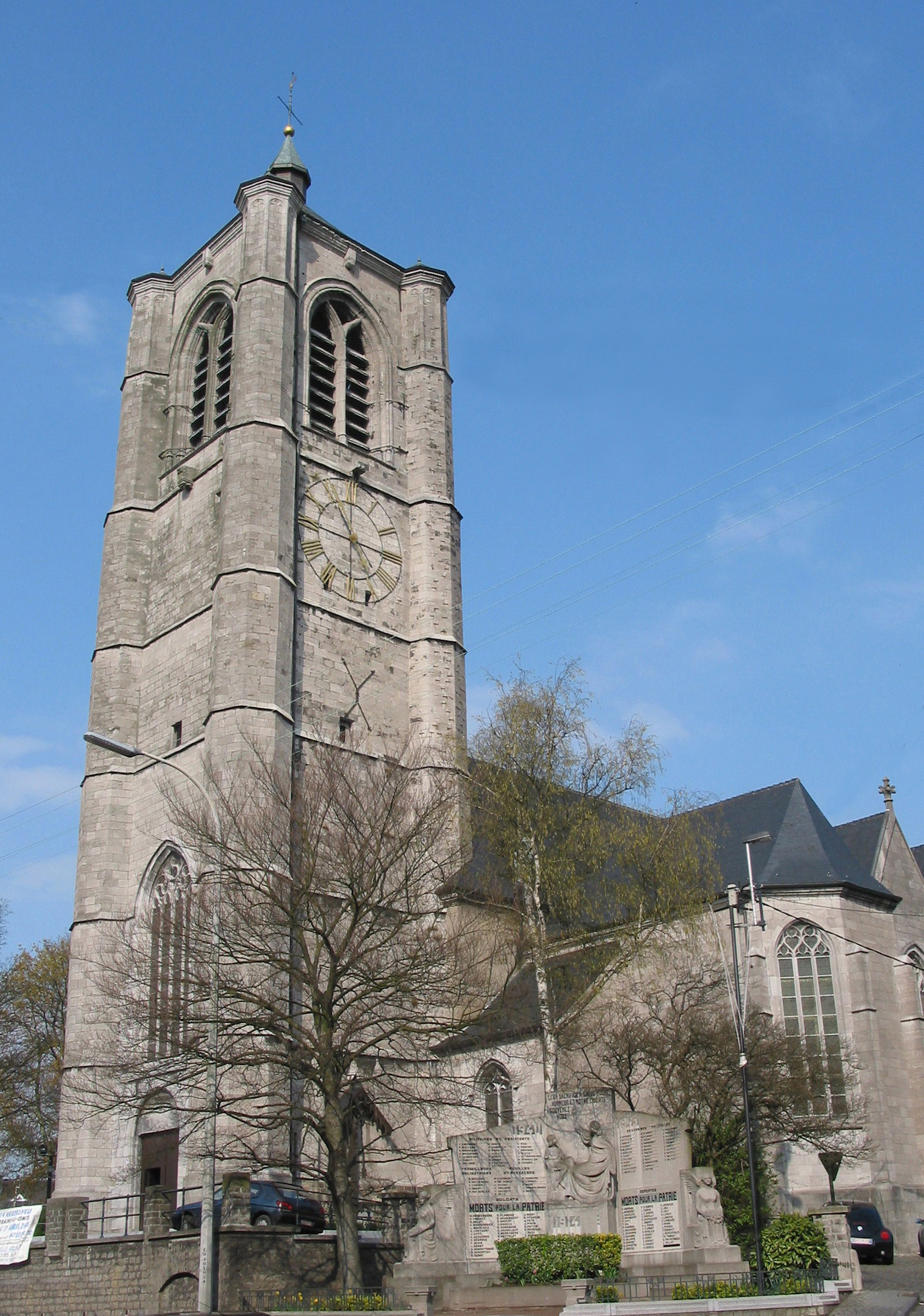
St. Gaugericus' Church

== History ==
On August 3, 1692, during the Nine Years War, the French army defeated a joint English-Dutch-German army in the Battle of Steenkerque in the current municipality of Braine-le-Comte.

=== Postal history ===
The Braine-le-Comte post-office opened before 1830. It used postal code 22 with bars (before 1864) and 53 with points (before 1874). The Hennuyères post office opened on 6 November 1865. It used postal code 161 with points (before 1874). The Ronquières post office opened on 10 January 1895.

Postal codes in 1969:

- 7198 Ronquières
- 7199 Henripont
- 7490 Braine-le-Comte
- 7491 Steenkerque
- 7492 Petit-Rœulx-lez-Braine
- 7498 Hennuyères

== Notable people ==
- Eden Hazard, Belgian international footballer
- Thorgan Hazard, Belgian international footballer
- Kylian Hazard, Belgian international footballer
- Father Damien, a Roman Catholic Saint that attended the College of Braine-le-Comte in 1858
