= Juvénal Uwilingiyimana =

Rwandan politician

- Born: 1951; Gisenyi
- Disappeared: 21 November 2005
- Died: November–December 2005; Belgium
- Cause of death: Murder
- Body discovered: 17 December 2005
- Political party: National Republican Movement for Democracy and Development

Juvénal Uwilingiyimana (1951–2005) was a Rwandan politician. He held office as Commerce Minister and as the head of national parks. He was an ethnic Hutu and originated in Gisenyi prefecture. In 1989, he was appointed the Minister for Trade in the MRND government of Juvénal Habyarimana. In 1994 he became the director of national tourism in the provisional government following Habyarimana's assassination.

The former Rwandan minister was collaborating with the Rwanda International Criminal Court (ICTR), which judges those responsible for the 1994 genocide, and had expressed fear for his life for his collaboration with the ICTR.

== After the genocide ==
Shortly thereafter, in the wake of the RPF victory after the Rwandan genocide, Uwilingiyimana fled the country. As of 2005, he was living in Anderlecht, Belgium, a suburb of Brussels.

On 10 June 2005 he was accused of complicity in the Rwandan genocide by the International Criminal Tribunal for Rwanda. The charges included incitement to genocide, complicity in genocide and murder. Following his indictment, Uwilingiyimana met with ICTR officials a number of times from August to November 2005, and provided information later used in the prosecution of other members of the former régime.

== Disappearance and death ==
On 21 November 2005, he disappeared from his home. Three months before his death he provided information to Arusha (Tanzania), the seat of the UN Court, which judges all those responsible for the Rwandan genocide.

Two members of the ICTR repeatedly interrogated the Rwandan politician, who was responsible for the massacre of 4,200 Rwandans. Uwilingiyimana's confessions allowed him to reduce part of his sentence, according to an agreement he had reached with the court. The last interrogation with the ICTR took place just three days before disappearing under harsh circumstances, his wife reported his disappearance.

In response to his death, ICTR Prosecutor Hassan Bubacar Jallow issued a statement indicating that "this individual, although an indictee of the Tribunal, voluntarily agreed to cooperate in the search for truth and justice for the Rwanda genocide of 1994. I convey my sincere condolences to his family."

The Chief Investigator of the ICTR, Stephen Rapp, inquired that the last meeting with Uwilingiyimana took place three days before his disappearance. One week after his disappearance a letter appeared by Uwilingiyimana. In the letter dated November 5, 2005, Uwilingiyimana addresses the prosecutor of the ICTR. It has him saying that he will no longer deal with the ICTR regarding the genocide. The letter also said that he was being told to give false information in order to incriminate others and that Rapps Canadian investigators had threatened to kill him and cut his body in pieces if he did not give the false testimony he required. This included certain members of the Akazu, and the leadership of the MRND.

On December 23, 2005, his badly mangled body was found floating in a canal in Brussels. It could have been a message: no one messes with the “family”, even if you are part of it. His body was so decomposed that DNA evidence was required to identify it. His hands had also been severed from his body. Although, the ICTR claims that extra precautions were taken in him releasing any information to them. Uwilingiyimana was not officially indicted by the tribunal until a week after he went missing. Defence counsel at the tribunal demanded that Rapp and the two Canadian police officers be suspended and investigated for involvement in the murder but nothing was done.
