= European route E429 =

Road in trans-European E-road network

E429

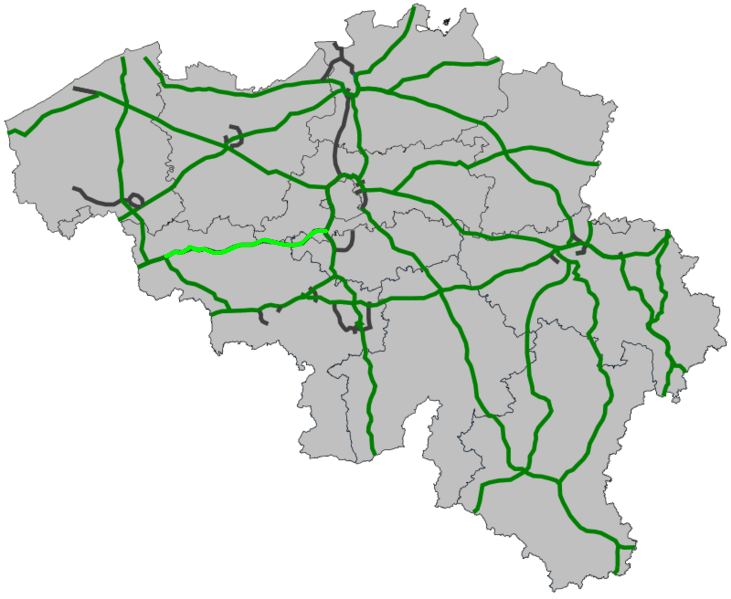
- European routes in Belgium with the E429 in bright green

Route information
- Length: 75 km (47 mi)

Major junctions
- From: Tournai
- Ath; Enghien
- To: Halle

Location
- Countries: Belgium

Highway system
- International E-road network; A Class; B Class

European route E 429 is part of the international E-road network.

== Route ==
- Belgium
  - E42 Tournai
  - Ath
  - Enghien
  - Halle
