= Saint-Ghislain =

City in Hainaut Province, Wallonia, Belgium

Saint-Ghislain Saint-Guilagne (Picard)
- Municipality
- Saint-Ghislain: the former town hall (1752), the new church, and the tower of the old church (16th century)

- Flag Coat of arms

- Location of Saint-Ghislain in Hainaut
- Interactive map of Saint-Ghislain
- Location in Belgium
- Coordinates: 50°27′N 03°49′E
- Country: Belgium
- Community: French Community
- Region: Wallonia
- Province: Hainaut
- Arrondissement: Mons

Government
  - Mayor: Daniel Olivier (PS)
  - Governing parties: PS - MR & Citoyens

Area
  - Total: 70.59 km^{2} (27.25 sq mi)

Population (2018-01-01)
  - Total: 23,335
  - Density: 330.6/km^{2} (856.2/sq mi)
- Postal codes: 7330-7334
- NIS code: 53070
- Area codes: 065
- Website: www.saint-ghislain.be

Saint-Ghislain (French pronunciation: [sɛ̃ ɡilɛ̃]; Picard: Saint-Guilagne; Walloon: Sint-Guilin) is a city and municipality of Wallonia located in the province of Hainaut, Belgium.

On 1 January 2018 the municipality had 23,335 inhabitants. The total area is 70.18 square kilometres (27.10 sq mi), giving a population density of 333 inhabitants per square kilometre (860/sq mi).

The municipality consists of the following districts: Baudour, Hautrage, Neufmaison, Saint-Ghislain, Sirault, Tertre et Villerot.

== History ==
The town is named after Saint Ghislain. In the 7th century, with two unknown disciples Ghislain made a clearing in the vicinity of Castrilocus (now Mons), later taking up his abode at a place called Ursidongus, where he built an oratory or chapel dedicated to Saints Peter and Paul. Ursidongus was later named after him.

== Economy ==
Google chose Saint-Ghislain in 2007 to host its new major European datacenter.

== People born in Saint-Ghislain ==
- Johannes Ockeghem, composer (between 1410 and 1425)

== Twin towns ==
- Saint-Lô, France (since 1961)
- Sierakowice, Poland (since 2005)
