= Silly, Belgium =

Municipality in Hainaut Province, Wallonia, Belgium

Silly: Chili (Picard); Opzullik (Dutch)
- Municipality
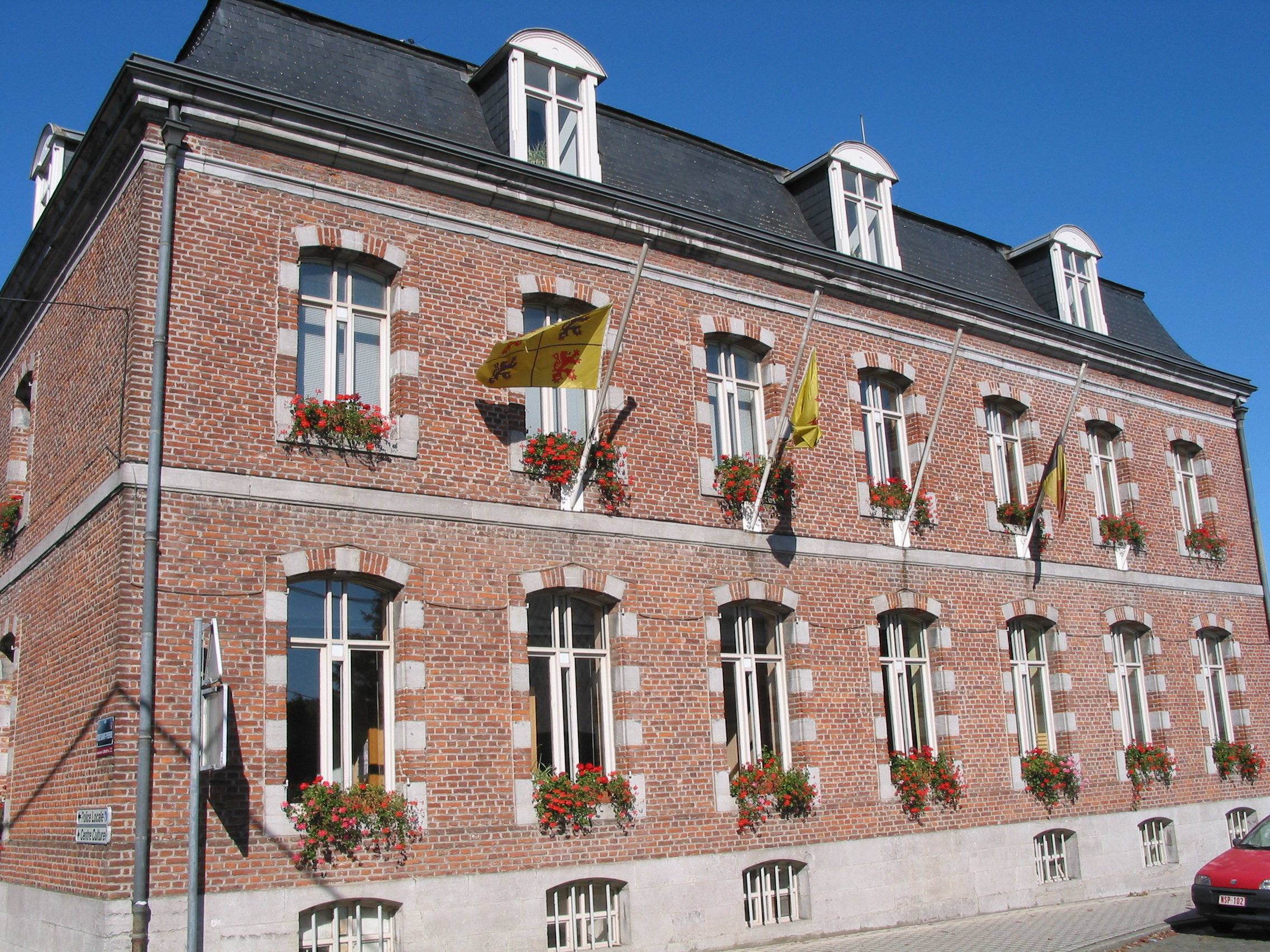
- Silly town hall

- Flag Coat of arms

- Location of Silly in Hainaut
- Interactive map of Silly
- Location in Belgium
- Coordinates: 50°39′N 03°55′E
- Country: Belgium
- Community: French Community
- Region: Wallonia
- Province: Hainaut
- Arrondissement: Ath

Government
  - Mayor: Christian Leclercq
  - Governing party: LB - SENS

Area
  - Total: 68.57 km^{2} (26.48 sq mi)

Population (2018-01-01)
  - Total: 8,407
  - Density: 122.6/km^{2} (317.5/sq mi)
- Postal codes: 7830
- NIS code: 51068
- Area codes: 068
- Website: www.silly.be

Silly (French pronunciation: [sili]; Dutch: Opzullik; Walloon: Chili) is a municipality of Wallonia located in the province of Hainaut, Belgium.

On January 1, 2018, Silly had a total population of 8,407. The total area is 67.68 square kilometres (26.13 sq mi) which gives a population density of 118 inhabitants per km^{2}.

The name of the town derives from its stream, called the Sille (French) or Zulle (Dutch), and has no relation to the English word. In the English-speaking world, it has frequently been noted on lists of unusual place names.

The municipality consists of the following districts: Fouleng, Gondregnies, Graty, Hellebecq, Hoves, Silly, Thoricourt, and Bassilly.

== International relations ==
=== Twin towns – Sister cities ===
Silly is twinned with:

- San Miniato, Italy
