= Rebecq =

Municipality in Walloon Brabant province, Wallonia, Belgium

- Municipality
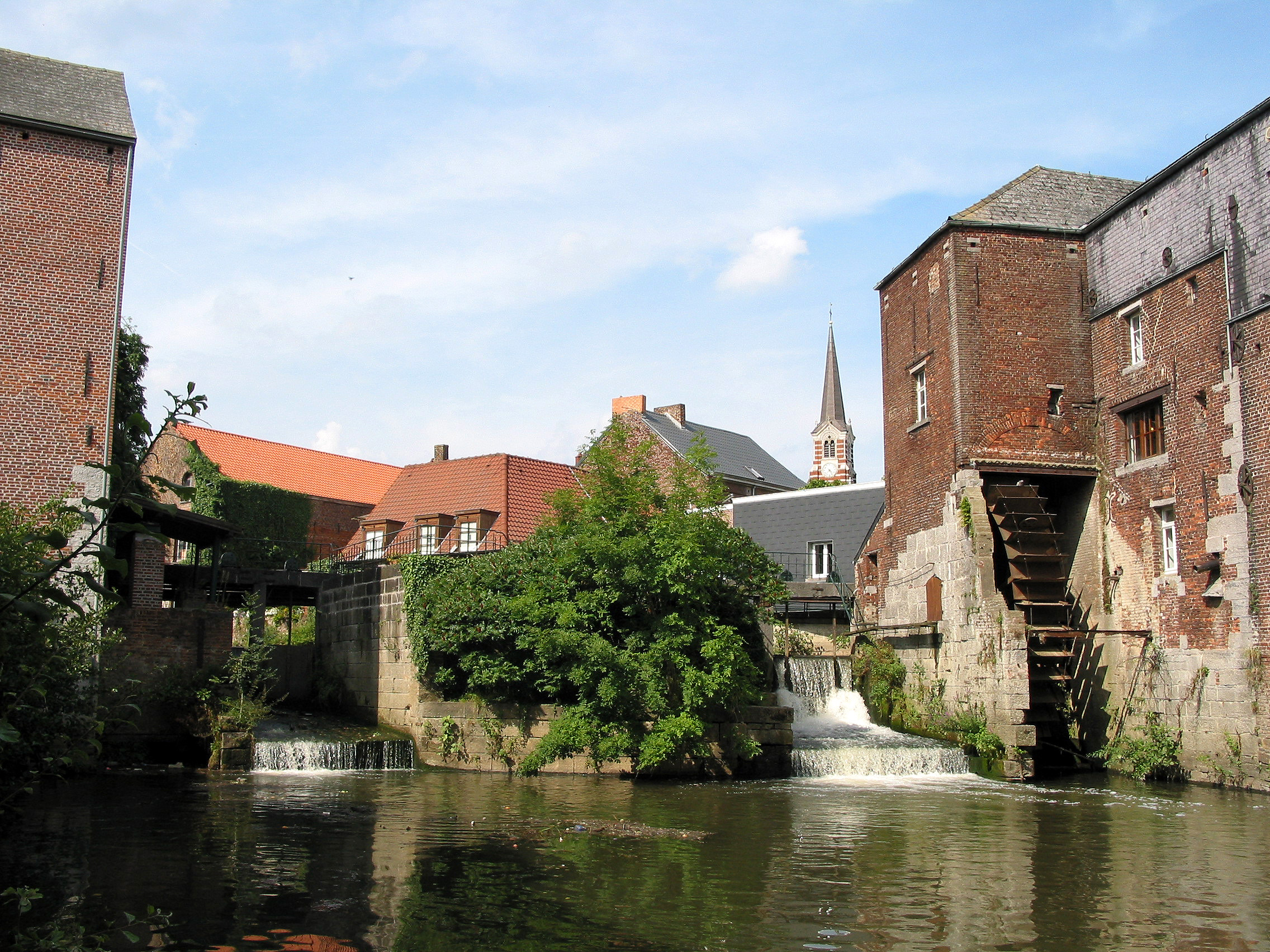
- The Arenberg watermills on the river Senne

- Flag Coat of arms

- The municipality of Rebecq in Walloon Brabant
- Interactive map of Rebecq
- Location in Belgium
- Coordinates: 50°39′N 04°08′E
- Country: Belgium
- Community: French Community
- Region: Wallonia
- Province: Walloon Brabant
- Arrondissement: Nivelles

Government
  - Mayor: Patricia Venturelli
  - Governing party: UNION (PS-cdH)

Area
  - Total: 39.26 km^{2} (15.16 sq mi)

Population (2018-01-01)
  - Total: 11,006
  - Density: 280.3/km^{2} (726.1/sq mi)
- Postal codes: 1430
- NIS code: 25123
- Area codes: 067
- Website: www.rebecq.be

Rebecq (French pronunciation: [ʁəbɛk]; Walloon: Ribek) is a municipality of Wallonia located in the Belgian province of Walloon Brabant. On 1 January 2006 the municipality had 10,241 inhabitants. The total area is 39.08 km^{2}, giving a population density of 262 inhabitants per km^{2}.

The municipality consists of the following districts: Bierghes, Rebecq-Rognon, and Quenast.

== Notable people ==
- François Huon is an artist of Rebecq.
- Ernest Solvay (b. Rebecq 1838 – Ixelles, 1922), chemist, industrialist and philanthropist.
- Irène Janssens
- Pierre Tilquin, founder of Gueuzerie Tilquin

== Twin towns ==
- Monghidoro, Italy, from 2002
