= 1870 in Belgium =

- Decades: 1850s; 1860s; 1870s; 1880s; 1890s
- See also: Other events of 1870; List of years in Belgium

Events in the year 1870 in Belgium.

== Incumbents ==
Monarch: Leopold II
Head of government: Walthère Frère-Orban (to 16 June); Jules d'Anethan (from 2 July)

== Events ==
March

- 4 March – Law on Temporalities establishes state oversight of parish finances.

May

- 23 May – Provincial elections

June

- 3 June – new conscription law, expanding numbers but retaining selection by lottery.
- 11 June – Partial legislative elections of 1870 return a hung parliament
- 16 June – Walthère Frère-Orban resigns as Prime Minister
- 18 June – Affligem Abbey, closed in 1796, refounded.

July

- 2 July – Jules d'Anethan replaces Walthère Frère-Orban as Prime Minister
- 13 July – Liberal Party conference in Brussels draws up new party programme.
- 15 July – General mobilisation in response to the outbreak of the Franco-Prussian War

August

- 2 August – General election, to break impasse of hung parliament, returns Catholic Party majority.
- 11 August – France and Prussia give assurances to Britain that Belgian neutrality will be respected during the Franco-Prussian War.

September

- 2 September – Belgian Red Cross despatches medical units to Lorraine in the wake of the Battle of Sedan.
- 23 September – Sumptuous public celebration of the 40th anniversary of Belgian independence.

== Publications ==
Periodicals

- Almanach royal officiel (Brussels, E. Guyot)
- Annuaire statistique de la Belgique begins publication (Brussels, Imprimerie de Delevingne et Callewaert)
- L'Illustration Européenne begins publication (Brussels, Bureaux de l'Administration)

Official studies and reports

- Épidémie typhoïde de 1869 (Brussels), report of the commission of inquiry into the 1869 epidemic of typhoid fever

Books

- Émile de Borchgrave, Histoire des rapports de droit public qui existèrent entre les provinces belges et l'Empire d'Allemagne depuis le démembrement de la monarchie carolingienne jusqu'à l'incorporation de la Belgique à la République française.
- Prosper de Haulleville, De l'enseignement primaire en Belgique.
- Prosper de Haulleville, La Nationalité belge; ou Flamands et Wallons
- Joseph Kervyn de Lettenhove, Chroniques relatives à l'histoire de la Belgique sous la domination des ducs de Bourgogne, vol. 1.
- Émile de Laveleye, La Russie et l'Autriche depuis Sadowa
- Émile de Laveleye, "Land System of Belgium and Holland", in Systems of Land Tenure in Various Countries (London, Macmillan & Co.)
- François Merten, Géographie industrielle et commerciale de la Belgique (Ghent, H. Hoste)
- Adolphe Quetelet, Anthropométrie, ou Mesure des différentes facultés de l'homme (Brussels, Leipzig and Ghent)

== Science ==
- Botanical Garden of Brussels (founded 1826) bought by the Belgian state.

== Art and architecture ==
- Prix de Rome: Xavier Mellery
- 22 March – La Monnaie in Brussels stages first performance in French of Richard Wagner's Lohengrin.

== Births ==
- 4 February – Raoul Warocqué, politician (died 1917)
- 28 March – Adolphe De Meulemeester, colonial official (died 1944)
- 7 April – Joseph Ryelandt, composer and musicologist (died 1965)
- 13 June – Jules Bordet, Nobel prize-winning microbiologist (died 1961)
- 28 July – Henri Jaspar, politician (died 1939)
- 20 September – Paul Peeters, Jesuit (died 1950)
- 24 October – Charles Saroléa, philologist (died 1953)
- 30 November – Princess Henriette of Belgium (died 1948) and Princess Joséphine Marie of Belgium (died 1871)

== Deaths ==
- 30 March – Charles de Groux (born 1825), painter
- 8 April – Charles Auguste de Bériot (born 1802), composer
- 6 June – Henri Adolphe Schaep (born 1826), painter
- 18 July – Jean Théodore Lacordaire (born 1801), entomologist
