= 1869 in Belgium =

- Decades: 1840s; 1850s; 1860s; 1870s; 1880s
- See also: Other events of 1869; List of years in Belgium

Events in the year 1869 in Belgium.

== Incumbents ==
Monarch: Leopold II
Head of government: Walthère Frère-Orban

== Events ==
- Epidemic of typhoid fever in Brussels.
- Brussels-South railway station opens.

February

- 20 February – Belgian senate passes a law prohibiting any French company from purchasing Belgian railways.

April

- 12 April – Metalworkers' strike at Cockerill in Seraing violently repressed (inspiring Karl Marx to write The Belgian Massacres).
- 25 April – Protocol signed to settle railway disputes between France and Belgium.

May

- 31 May – Horse-drawn omnibuses introduced in Brussels.

September

- 8 September – Belgian railways introduce cheap workers' season tickets.

== Publications ==
Periodicals

- Almanach royal officiel (Brussels, E. Guyot)
- Analectes pour servir à l'histoire ecclésiastique de la Belgique, vol. 6
- Collection de précis historiques, vol. 18, edited by Edouard Terwecoren S.J.

Studies and reports

- Édouard van den Corput, Origine et cause de l'epidémie de fièvre typhoide qui a règné à Bruxelles en 1869 (Brussels).
- Jean-Auguste Jourdain, Dictionnaire encyclopédique de géographie historique du royaume en Belgique

Literature

- Maria Doolaeghe Najaarsvruchten

== Births ==
- 5 February – Leo Goemans, dialectologist (died 1955)
- 5 April – Isabelle Errera, art historian (died 1929)
- 3 June – Prince Baudouin of Belgium (died 1891)

== Deaths ==
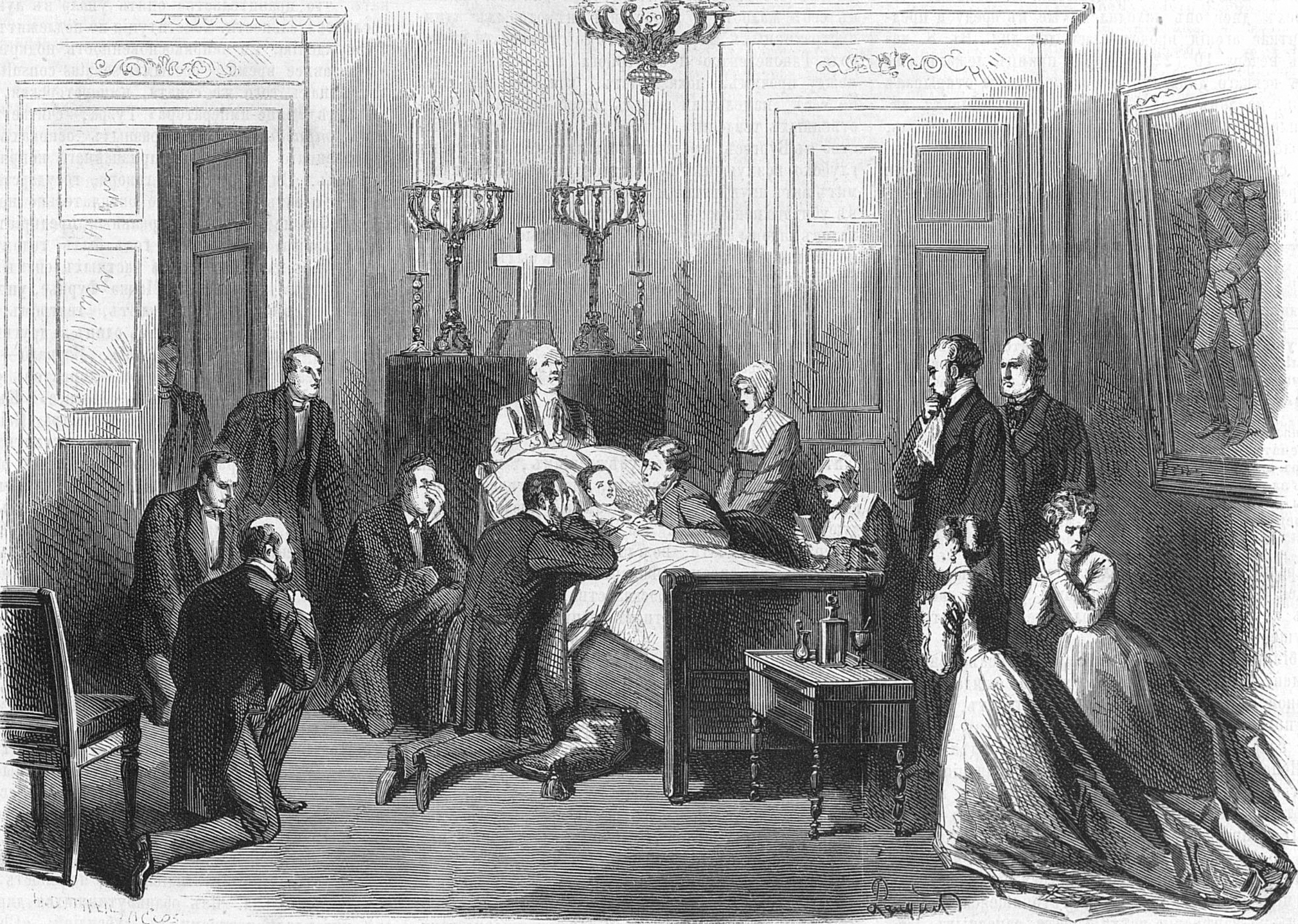
The death of Prince Leopold

- 22 January – Prince Leopold, Duke of Brabant, heir to the Belgian throne (born 1859).
- 4 February – Johan Michiel Dautzenberg (born 1808), poet and educationalist.
- 17 August – Alexandre Rodenbach (born 1786), blind politician
- 26 August – Henri Leys (born 1815), painter.
- 11 October – François-Joseph Navez (born 1787), painter.
- 3 November – Cornelis Broeckx (born 1807), physician and bibliophile
