= Victor D'Hondt =

Belgian lawyer and jurist (1841–1901)

Victor Joseph Auguste D'Hondt
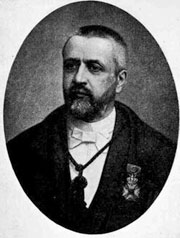
- Born: 20 November 1841; Ghent, Belgium
- Died: 30 May 1901 (aged 59); Ghent, Belgium
- Occupations: Businessman, jurist, lawyer, mathematician
- Known for: Electoral voting system

Victor Joseph Auguste D'Hondt (Dutch: [ˈvɪktɔr ˈtɔnt]; 20 November 1841 – 30 May 1901) was a Belgian lawyer and jurist of civil law at Ghent University. He devised a procedure, the D'Hondt method, which he first described in 1878, for allocating seats to candidates in party-list proportional representation elections. The method has been adopted by a number of countries, including Albania, Argentina, Armenia, Austria, Belgium, Bulgaria, Chile, Colombia, Croatia, Czech Republic, Denmark, Ecuador, Fiji, Finland, Israel, Japan, North Macedonia, the Netherlands, Northern Ireland, Paraguay, Poland, Portugal, Scotland, Slovenia, Serbia, Spain, Switzerland, Turkey, Iceland, Uruguay and Wales. A modified D'Hondt system is used for elections to the London Assembly and the Scottish Parliament.

Victor D’Hondt was an influential proponent of proportional representation in Belgium. He published several articles on proportional representation and was founding member of the Association Réformiste Belge pour l'Adoption de la Representation Proportionnelle in 1881. From 1885 he served as professor of civil and fiscal law at the University of Ghent. In 1896 he was awarded the title Officer in the Belgian Order of Leopold.

== Biography ==
=== Early life ===
D’Hondt was born in Ghent on November 20, 1841 to a family of Catholic lawyers. He studied to become a lawyer starting at a young age, and was enrolled in the Ghent bar. After working as a lawyer for ten years he became the Registrar at the Commercial Court of Ghent and then married the British Anne Clifford in 1877.

=== Political career ===
D’Hondt began his political career in 1872 when he was elected to the Ghent city council during the elections of that year as an independent member of the Catholic opposition during a time when the liberals held a monopoly over the council. In 1881 D'Hondt founded the Belgian branch of the French League for proportional representation and from 1882 to 1885 he published three major works: Système pratique et raisonné de représentation proportionnelle, Formule du minimum dans la représentation proportionnelle, and Exposé du système pratique de représentation proportionnelle which outlined a system that would allocate seats to parties approximately in proportion to the number of votes received as opposed to the winner-take-all nature of first past the post.

During this time in 1883 Belgium was led by a liberal government headed by Walthère Frère-Orban which proposed to enlarge municipal suffrage to those who paid a certain amount in taxes and had obtained a high-school degree but maintained a barrière infranchissable (impassable barrier) on the issue of universal suffrage opting to instead tie suffrage to education much to the dismay of Catholics like D'Honte. However, in the 1884 election the Catholic Party won an uncontested majority. In 1885 he became the chair of the Ghent Faculty of Law at the Universiteit Gent as part of a move by the new government to break up the Liberal's hold over academia. In addition to civil law, he also taught tax law and notarial law and published a journal on commercial law; the La Jurisprudence Commerciale des Flandres. He was one of the first professors to openly teach in Dutch and sought to expand access to universities to the middle class. It was during this time that he also assembled a team of legal professors to investigate social issues including a system of unemployment insurance, as well as further studies of his method of proportional representation.

He was re-elected in the 1890 election this time on the "City Interest" list with fellow Catholic politicians including Gérard Cooreman. In 1899 the Catholics re-wrote the Belgian constitution to implement the D'Hondt method nationwide.

=== Later life ===
D'Hondt died On May 30, 1901, shortly after retiring from his professorship due to illness and is buried at the Sint-Denijs-Westrem cemetery.

== Personal life ==
D'Hondt and Anne Clifford had two daughters: Marie Cécil D'Hondt (born 23 November, 1888) and Agnes D'Hondt (born 20 May, 1891).

== Legacy ==
While Belgium adopted the D'Hondt method during his lifetime, it wouldn't be until 1919 when a second country, France, would also adopt the method.

== Publications ==
- Question électorale. La représentation proportionnelle des partis. Bruxelles, 1878.
- Système pratique et raisonné de représentation proportionnelle. Bruxelles, 1882.
- Formule du minimum dans la représentation proportionnelle. In Représentation proportionnelle—Revue mensuelle 2, pages 117–130, 1883
- Exposé du système pratique de représentation proportionnelle adopté par le Comité de l’Association Réformiste Belge. Gand, 1885.
