= 1872 Belgian general election =

- 11 June 1872

63 of the 124 seats in the Chamber of Representatives 63 seats needed for a majority
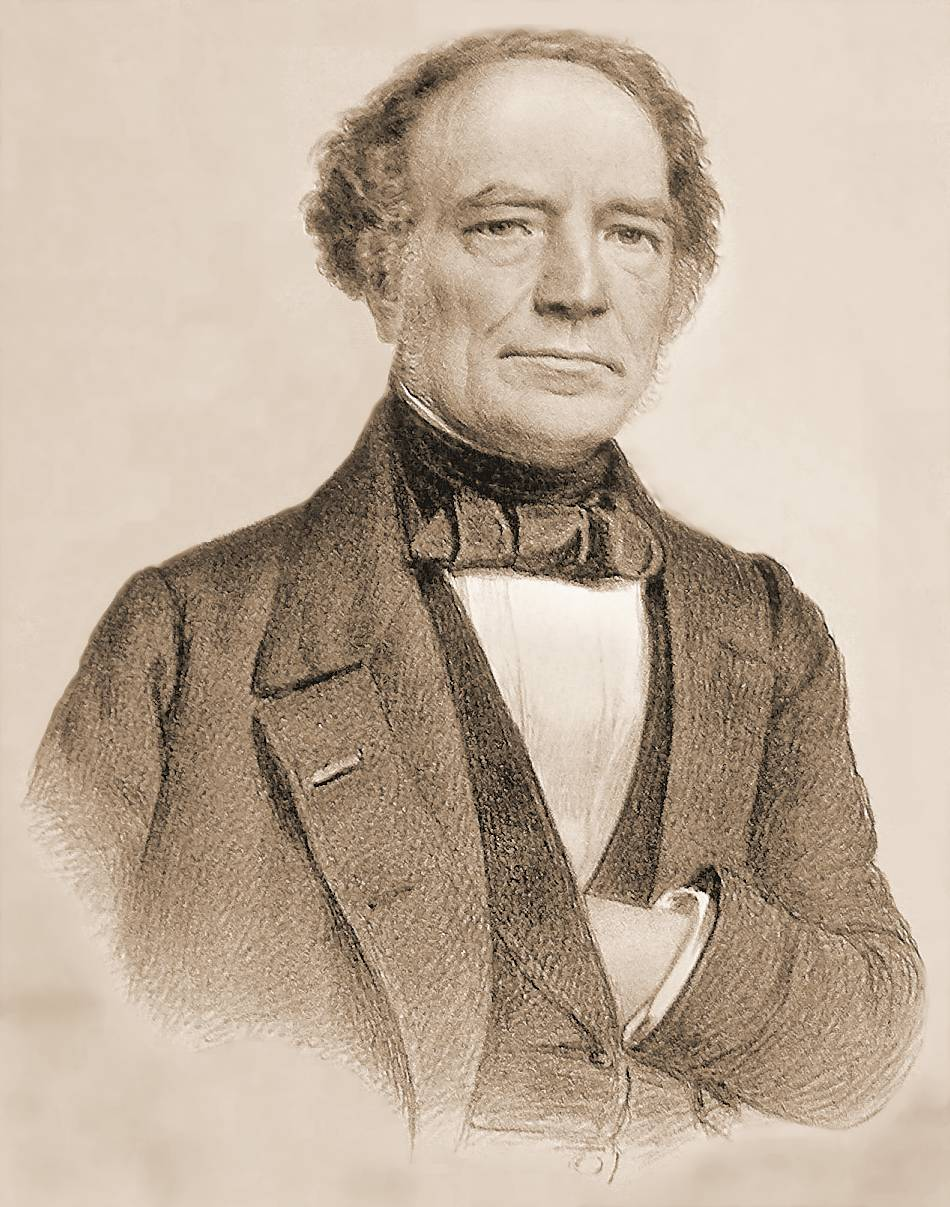

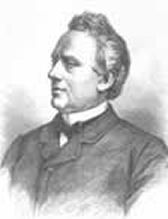
	First party	Second party
Leader	Barthélémy de Theux de Meylandt	Walthère Frère-Orban
Party	Catholic	Liberal
Leader since	Candidate for PM	Candidate for PM
Seats before	72 seats	52 seats
Seats won	43	20
Seats after	71	53
Seat change	▼1	▲1
Popular vote	20,949	9,455
Percentage	68.75%	31.03%
Government before election
de Theux de Meylandt III
Catholic
Government after election
de Theux de Meylandt III
Catholic

Partial general elections were held in Belgium on Tuesday 11 June 1872. In the elections for the Chamber of Representatives the result was a victory for the Catholic Party, which won 71 of the 124 seats. Voter turnout was 55.5%, although only 54,933 people were eligible to vote.

Under the alternating system, elections were only held in five out of the nine provinces: Antwerp, Brabant, Luxembourg, Namur and West Flanders.

The incumbent government was a Catholic government led by Jules Malou.

== Results ==
=== Chamber of Representatives ===
Party	Votes	%	Seats		
Party	Votes	%	Won	Total	+/–
Catholic Party	20,949	68.75	43	71	–1
Liberal Party	9,455	31.03	20	53	+1
Others	66	0.22	0	0	New
Total	30,470	100.00	63	124	0
Total votes	30,470	–			
Registered voters/turnout	54,933	55.47			
Source: Mackie & Rose, Sternberger et al.

The results exclude the voting figures for the Nivelles constituency.
