= Jules Malou =

Belgian politician (1810–1886)

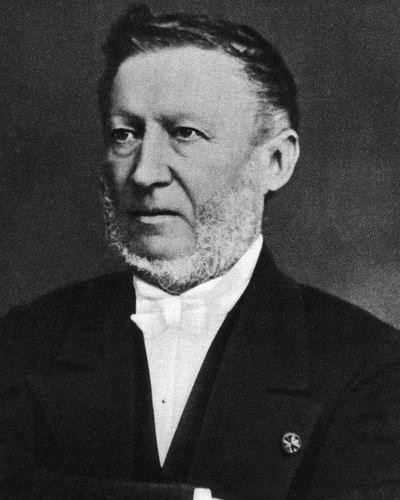

Prime Minister of Belgium
- In office 16 June 1884 – 26 October 1884
- Monarch: Leopold II
- Preceded by: Walthère Frère-Orban
- Succeeded by: Auguste Marie François Beernaert
- In office 21 August 1874 – 19 June 1878
- Monarch: Leopold II
- Preceded by: Barthélémy de Theux de Meylandt
- Succeeded by: Walthère Frère-Orban

Personal details
- Born: 19 October 1810 Ypres, France (now Belgium)
- Died: 11 July 1886 (aged 75) Woluwe-Saint-Lambert, Belgium
- Party: Catholic Party

Jules Edouard Xavier Malou (French pronunciation: [ʒyl edwaʁ ɡzavje malu], 19 October 1810 – 11 July 1886) was a Belgian statesman who served as the Prime Minister of Belgium from 1874 to 1878 and again from June to October 1884.

== Career ==
Malou was born in Ypres. He was a civil servant in the department of justice when he was elected to the Chamber of Deputies by his native constituency in 1841, and was for some time governor of the province of Antwerp. He served as Minister of Finance in the coalition ministry of Jean Baptiste, Baron Nothomb in 1844 and formed with B. T. de Theux de Meylandt a Catholic cabinet in 1846 which lost power after the Liberal victory of 1847.

Malou then became a member of the senate, and his party only regained ascendancy in 1870. The distinctly clerical ministry of Baron Jules d'Anethan retired in December 1871 after serious rioting in Brussels, and Malou was the real, though not the nominal, head of the more moderate clerical administrations of de Theux and Aspremont-Lynden (1870–1878). He disavowed the sympathy of Belgian Ultramontane politicians with the German victims of the Kulturkampf, and, retaining in his own hands the portfolio of finance, he subordinated his clerical policy to a useful administration in commercial matters, including a development of the railway system.

=== As prime minister ===
It was only after the fall of the ministry in 1878 that he adopted a strongly pro-clerical policy, and when he became chief of a new government in June 1884 he proceeded to undo the secularisation of education instituted by the Liberal Frère-Orban ministry. His legislation in favor of the Catholic schools caused rioting in Brussels, and in October the king demanded the retirement of Jacobs and Woeste, the members of the cabinet against whom popular indignation was chiefly directed. Malou followed them into retirement.

== Later life ==
An experienced financier, his works (of which a long list is given in Konincks Bibliographie nationale de Belgique) include three series (1874–1880) of memoirs on financial questions, edited by him for the Chamber of Deputies, besides pamphlets on railroad proposals, mining and other practical questions. He died in Woluwe-Saint-Lambert, Brabant in 1886. His brother Jean-Baptiste Malou (1809–1864) was a well-known theologian who served as Bishop of Bruges.

== Honours ==
- Belgium: Minister of State, by royal decree
- Belgium: Grand Cordon in the Order of Leopold
- France: Knight Grand Cross in the Legion of Honour
- Netherlands: Knight Grand Cross in the Order of the Netherlands Lion
- Spain: Knight Grand Cross in the Order of Charles III
- Grand Cross in the Illustrious Royal Order of Saint Januarius

== Sources ==
- Steve Heylen, Bart De Nil, Bart D’hondt, Sophie Gyselinck, Hanne Van Herck en Donald Weber, Geschiedenis van de provincie Antwerpen. Een politieke biografie, Antwerpen, Provinciebestuur Antwerpen, 2005, Vol. 2 p. 125

Political offices
Preceded by Henri de Brouckère	Governor of Antwerp; 1844–1845	Succeeded by Jan Teichmann
Preceded by Barthélémy de Theux de Meylandt	Prime Minister of Belgium; 1874–1878	Succeeded by Walthère Frère-Orban
Preceded by Walthère Frère-Orban	Prime Minister of Belgium; 1884	Succeeded by Auguste Marie François Beernaert
