= Commemorative medal of the 1870–1871 War =

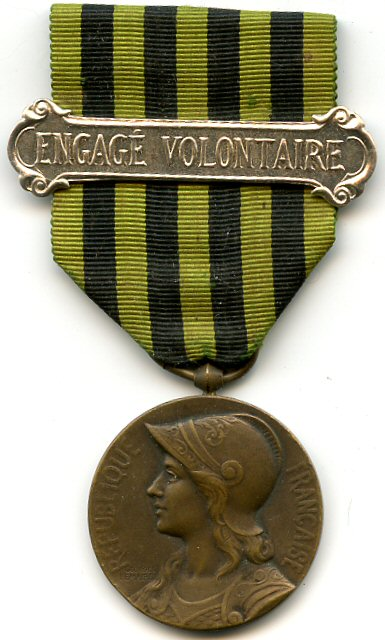
- Commemorative medal of the 1870–1871 War (obverse)
- Type: Campaign Medal
- Presented by: France
- Eligibility: Military service in 1870-1871
- Campaign: Franco-Prussian War
- Status: No longer awarded
- Established: 9 November 1911

Highlights
- Total: ~150,000
- Ribbon of the medal

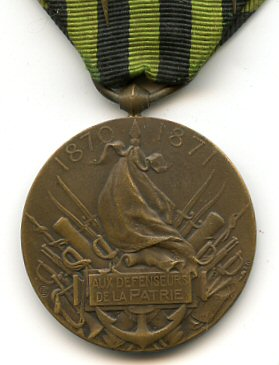
Reverse of the Commemorative medal of the 1870–1871 War

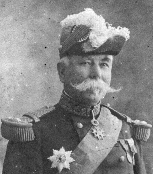
General Émile Zimmer, a recipient of the Commemorative medal of the 1870–1871 War

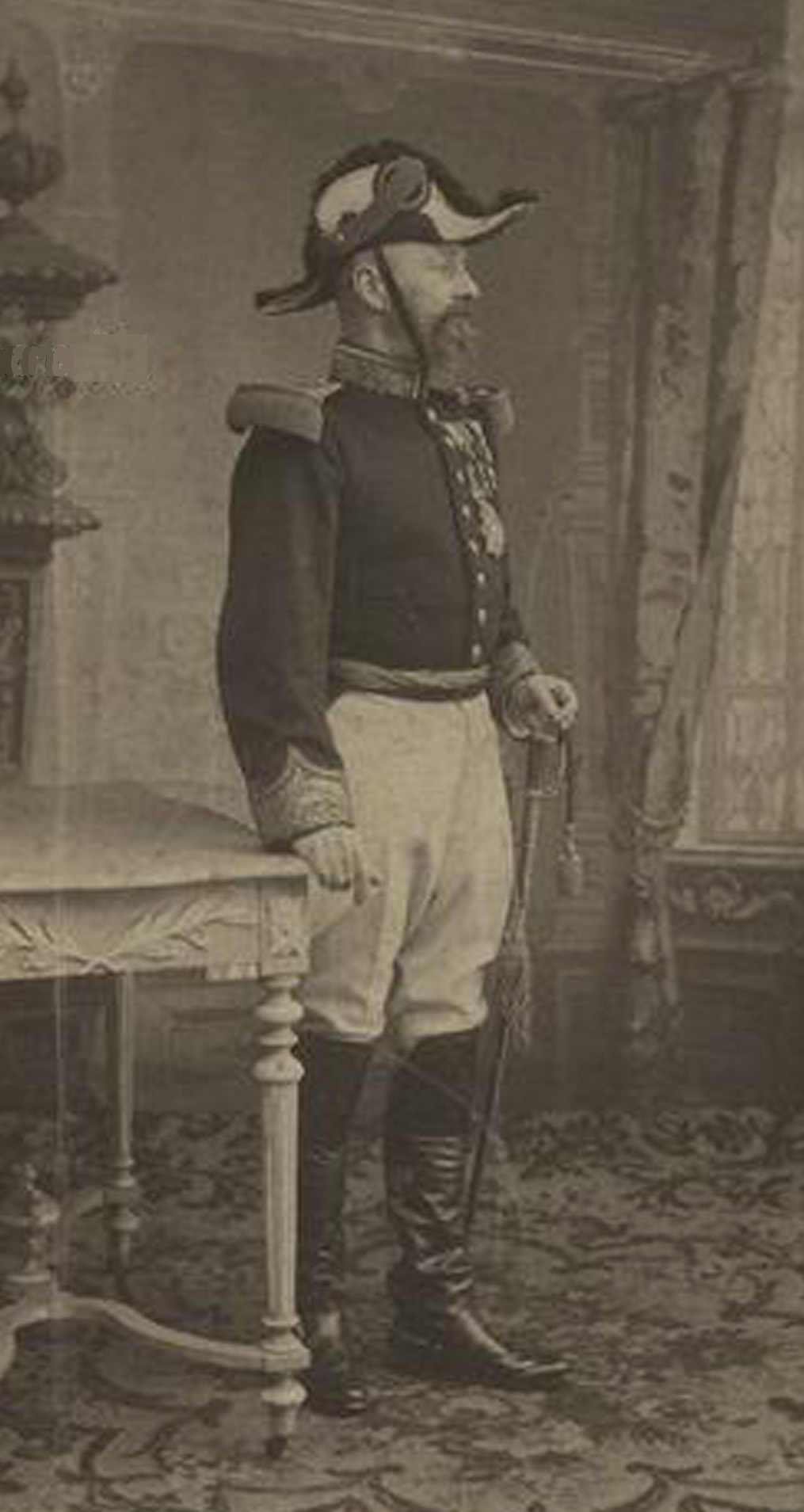
General Charles-Marie de Braconnier, a recipient of the Commemorative medal of the 1870–1871 War

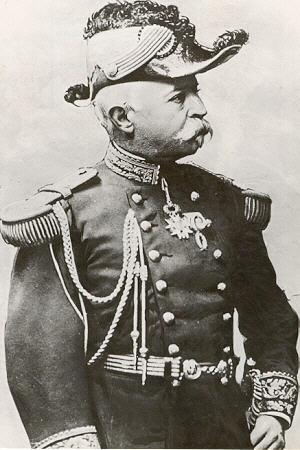
General Édouard Laffon de Ladebat, a recipient of the Commemorative medal of the 1870–1871 War

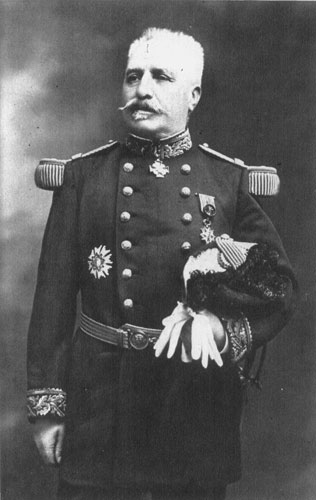
General Noël Édouard, vicomte de Curières de Castelnau, a recipient of the Commemorative medal of the 1870–1871 War

The Commemorative medal of the 1870–1871 War (French: Médaille commémorative de la guerre 1870–1871) was a French military campaign medal awarded to those who served during the Franco-Prussian War.

The war, declared by Emperor Napoleon III on Prussia on 19 July 1870, ended in defeat for France and terminated in the Treaty of Frankfurt of 10 May 1871.

Although the bravest were rewarded with the Legion of Honour and the Military Medal, the by-then republican authorities firmly refused to create a commemorative medal for award to the participants of the conflict, possibly in an effort to forget the humiliation and national shame caused by the sad events. Forty years would have to elapse before the government would agree to a tangible form of recognition for the surviving veterans of the conflict. The Commemorative medal of the 1870–1871 War was finally established by a law of 9 November 1911.

== Award statute ==
The Commemorative medal of the 1870–1871 War was awarded to veterans of the Franco-Prussian War who could prove with an official document, their service under French colours in France or Algeria, or on board armed naval vessels, between the months of July 1870 and February 1871, in:

- the regular army;
- the National Guard;
- the Corps-Francs;
- the mobilized National Guard;
- the sedentary National Guard of besieged cities;
- the sedentary National Guard of open cities;
- the Navy;
- organized irregular corps (Paris police, forestry agents and guards, customs officials);
- the military postal and treasury services;
- the sedentary National Guard of open cities, attacked in 1870–71, whose courage was recognized by the government with the addition of the cross of the Legion of Honour in their coats or arms.

The law of 27 March 1912 enlarged this list of potential recipients to include doctors, medics, nurses and chaplains able to prove their presence on the battlefield, in ambulances and hospitals, as well as to balloon pilots who escaped from besieged Paris to carry out a public service.

A decree of 17 September 1921 added all veterans of the war of 1870-1871 that were wounded or maimed in combat, or that particularly distinguished themselves in the face of the enemy, as potential recipients of the Military Medal.

Finally, a new law of 13 July 1923 (published on 17 July 1923) added as recipients:

- children under fourteen years of age at the 1870 declaration of war, who volunteered and were enlisted in the battalions of the National Guard to receive the medal with the clasp "ENGAGÉ VOLONTAIRE" (English: "VOLUNTEER ENLISTEE"). The accompanying scroll will bear the title "ENFANT VOLONTAIRE" (English: "VOLUNTEER CHILD") as well as the company and battalion numbers.
- children under the age of eighteen who, although not enlisted during the war, accomplished acts of civic courage that could be proven as authentic.

== Award description ==
The Commemorative medal of the 1870–1871 War was a 30-mm-in-diameter circular medal struck from bronze. Its obverse bore the relief image of the effigy of the "warrior republic" in the form of the left profile of a helmeted woman's bust wearing armour. On either side, the relief inscription along the outer medal circumference "RÉPUBLIQUE FRANÇAISE" (English: "FRENCH REPUBLIC"). The reverse bore at its lower center, a rectangle bearing the relief inscription "AUX DÉFENSEURS DE LA PATRIE" (English: "TO THE NATION'S DEFENDERS"), superimposed over the relief images of military weapons (sabres, lances, cannons), a naval anchor and a flowing banner, at its top, the relief years "1870 1871" bisected by the banner's mast.

The medal hung from a ribbon passing through a ring itself passing through a ball shaped suspension loop at the top. The 36-mm-wide green silk moiré ribbon bore four 4-mm-wide equidistant vertical black stripes, the whole forming nine alternating 4 mm stripes. The clasp "ENGAGÉ VOLONTAIRE" (English: "VOLUNTEER ENLISTEE") could be worn on the ribbon.

The medal was engraved by artist Georges Lemaire, his model to represent the effigy of the republic was Miss Fernande Dubois, an artist at the Opéra-Comique.

== Notable recipients ==
- Marshal Ferdinand Foch
- General Émile Zimmer
- General Louis Archinard
- General Michel-Joseph Maunoury
- General Louis François Léon Friant
- General Tell Aristide Frédéric Antoine Chapel
- General Maurice Bailloud
- General Ludovic Hurault de Vibraye
- General Édouard Laffon de Ladebat
- General Noël Édouard, viscount of Curières and of Castelnau
- General Marie Charles Justin Tournier
- General George Albert Bazaine-Hayter
- General Louis André
- General Raoul Le Mouton de Boisdeffre
- General Auguste Dubail
- General Maurice Balfourier
- General Charles-Marie de Braconnier
- General Marie Félix Silvestre
- General Joseph Joffre
- General Alfred Frédéric Philippe Auguste Napoléon Ameil
- General Jean Baptiste Jules Carbillet
- General Brice Adrien Bizot
- Rear admiral Benjamin Jaurès
- Colonel Charles Nicolas Friant
- Colonel Léon Aurousseau
- Captain Pharaon Van Del Bulke
- Chaplain Osmin Gardey
- Léon de Vesly
- Field Marshal Earl Kitchener (who served in a French ambulance unit)

== See also ==
- Ems Dispatch
- Franco-Prussian War
- Austro-Prussian War
- Peace of Prague (1866)
- Napoleon III
- William I, German Emperor
- Otto von Bismarck
