= Guillaume d'Aspremont Lynden =

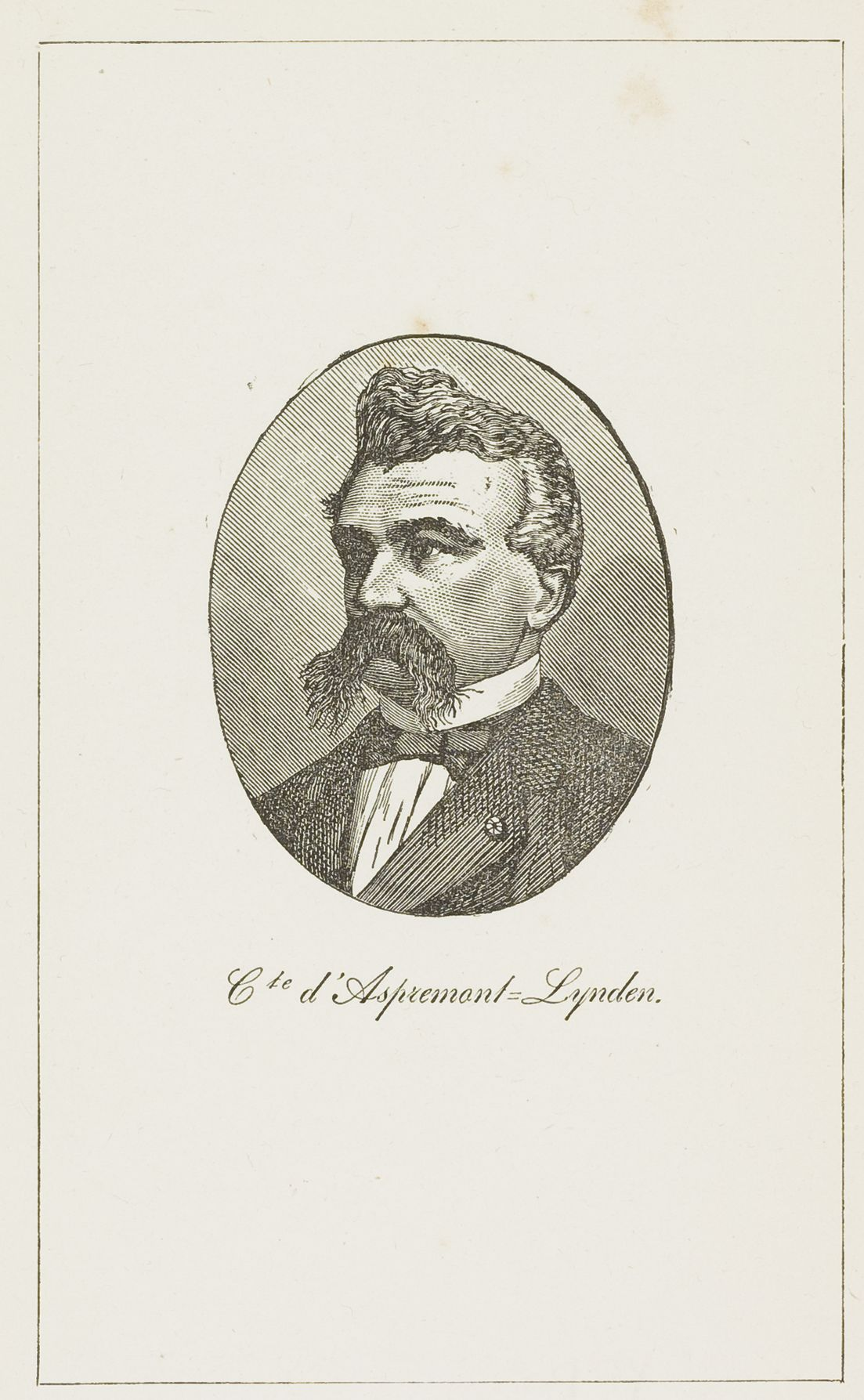

Guillaume Bernard Ferdinand Charles, Count of Aspremont Lynden (1815–1889) was a member of the Belgian Senate and minister of foreign affairs (1871–1878).

== Life ==
Aspremont Lynden was born in Haltinne castle on 15 October 1815, as the second son of Count Joseph Ferdinand Gobert of Aspremont-Lynden and Charlotte van der Straten, daughter of Baron Antoine van der Straten and Vicomtesse Charlotte de Nieulant, et de Pottelsberghe.

He was elected to the Senate on 26 April 1864 for the arrondissement of Namur, which he continued to represent until 19 June 1884. He served as Minister of Foreign Affairs from 7 December 1871 to 19 June 1878. During the Kulturkampf he was obliged to defend the freedom of the Belgian press to report on developments in Germany as they saw fit. He didn't marry and died without issue. He died in Namur on 6 September 1889.

Preceded by Jules d'Anethan	Foreign Minister of Belgium; 1871-1878	Succeeded by Walthère Frère-Orban
