= June 1870 Belgian general election =

Belgian general election, June 1870
- 14 June 1870

61 of the 122 seats in the Chamber of Representatives 62 seats needed for a majority
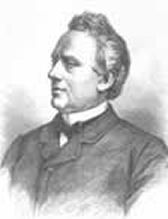

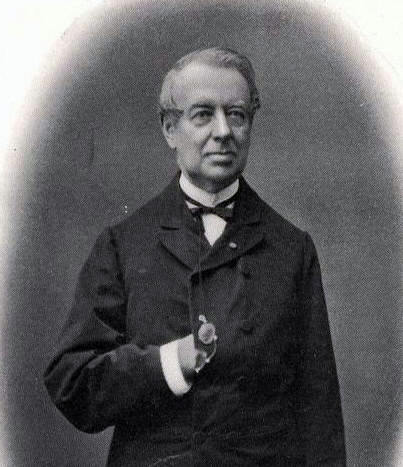
	First party	Second party
Leader	Walthère Frère-Orban	Jules d'Anethan
Party	Liberal	Catholic
Leader since	Candidate for PM	Candidate for PM
Seats before	72 seats	50 seats
Seats won	31	30
Seats after	61	61
Seat change	▼11	▲11
Popular vote	17,173	13,698
Percentage	55.63%	44.37%
Government before election
Frère-Orban I
Liberal
Government after election
d'Anethan
Catholic

Partial general elections were held in Belgium on Tuesday 14 June 1870. In the elections for the Chamber of Representatives the Liberal Party and the Catholic Party both won 61 seats, resulting in a hung parliament. Voter turnout was 60%, although only 51,435 people were eligible to vote. Consequently, early elections were held two months later.

Under the alternating system, elections for the Chamber of Representatives were only held in four out of the nine provinces: Hainaut, Limburg, Liège and East Flanders.

== Results ==
=== Chamber of Representatives ===
Party	Votes	%	Seats		
Party	Votes	%	Won	Total	+/–
Liberal Party	17,173	55.63	31	61	–11
Catholic Party	13,698	44.37	30	61	+11
Total	30,871	100.00	61	122	0
Total votes	30,871	–			
Registered voters/turnout	51,435	60.02			
Source: Mackie & Rose, Sternberger et al.

== See also ==
- Belgium and the Franco-Prussian War
