= The Belgian Massacres =

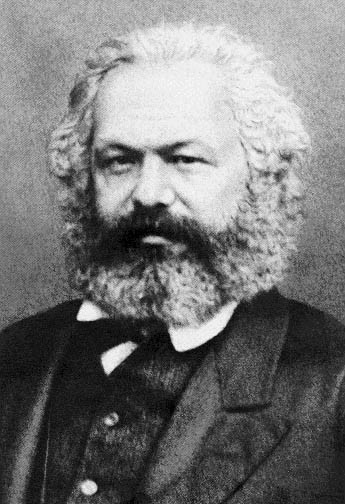
- Karl Marx, pictured in 1869
- Author: Karl Marx
- Language: French; English
- Subject: State repression of strikes and class conflict in Belgium
- Publication date: 12 May 1869
- Media type: Print
- Preceded by: "Value, Price and Profit" (1865)
- Followed by: "The Civil War in France" (1871)

"The Belgian Massacres. To the Workmen of Europe and the United States" is a minor political pamphlet written by Karl Marx in May 1869. In it, Marx responds to the violent repression of strikes which had occurred in Belgium the previous month.

== Background ==
Socialism, as a political ideology, first emerged in Belgium in the second half of the nineteenth century. Karl Marx had briefly lived in Brussels as an exile between 1845 and 1848 but had made no inroads into the dominance of Belgian politics by Liberal and Catholic parties. The reign of Leopold II (r. 1865–1909) first saw the rise of organised socialist political groups and parties, most notably among the industrial workers in the southern region of Wallonia. Trade unions were legalized in 1866, opening the way to organised labour politics. The International Workingmen's Association held its first conference outside Switzerland in Brussels in 1868 as Belgian socialism, under figures such as César De Paepe, expanded dramatically. A strike broke out in April 1869 in the industrial towns of Seraing, Liège Province and Frameries, Hainaut Province which was repressed with violence. At least nine strikers were killed by the Garde Civique, a militia, during the ensuing confrontation. A detailed report of the strike was provided to the International by the Belgian socialist Eugène Hins.

== Text ==
Marx's pamphlet was prepared in French and English versions and presented to the General Council of the International on 4 May 1869 and was officially published as a leaflet in London on 12 May 1869. It was subsequently republished, either integrally or in condensed form, in a number of Belgian and European newspapers.

In the text, Marx contrasts the relative acceptance of strikes in the United Kingdom and the United States with the aggressive posture taken in Belgium. He writes:

There exists but one country in the civilised world where every strike is eagerly and joyously turned into a pretext for the official massacre of the Working Class. That country of single blessedness is Belgium! the model state of continental constitutionalism, the snug, well-hedged, little paradise of the landlord, the capitalist, and the priest. The earth performs not more surely its yearly revolution than the Belgian Government its yearly Working Men’s massacre. The massacre of this year does not differ from last year’s massacre, but by the ghastlier number of its victims, the more hideous ferocity of an otherwise ridiculous army, the noisier jubilation of the clerical and capitalist press, and the intensified frivolity of the pretexts put forward by the Governmental butchers.

Marx suggests several explanations for the violent repression of the strike. He considers that the Belgian Army provoked the rioting which was used to justify the repression of the strike and accuses conservative political and commercial interests in Belgium of complicity. He also suggests that the violent repression was intended to send a political message to the French Emperor Napoleon III. He draws a comparison with the British repression of the Morant Bay rebellion of 1865 in Jamaica. Ultimately, he attacks the government of Walthère Frère-Orban for "conspicuously playing the gendarme of capital against labour" and threatens that the result will be the weakening of proletarian support for Belgian independence, enabling the possible future annexation of Belgium by the Great Powers. He calls for money to be collected by workers from Europe and the United States to compensate the families of the workers killed.
