= 1884 Belgian general election =

- 10 June 1884 (Chamber first round); 17 June 1884 (Chamber run-off); 8 July 1884 (Senate first round); 15 July 1884 (Senate run-off)

69 of the 138 seats in the Chamber of Representatives 70 seats needed for a majority
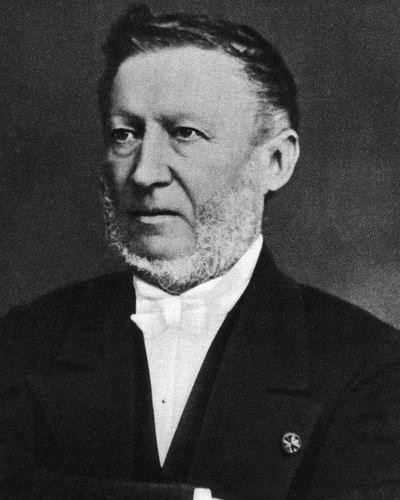

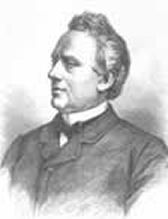
	First party	Second party
Leader	Jules Malou	Walthère Frère-Orban
Party	Catholic	Liberal
Leader since	Candidate for PM	Candidate for PM
Seats before	59 seats	79 seats
Seats won	67	2
Seats after	86	52
Seat change	▲27	▼27
Popular vote	33,428	21,294
Percentage	57.48%	36.62%
Government before election
Frère-Orban II
Liberal
Government after election
Malou II
Catholic

Legislative elections were held in Belgium in June and July 1884, for partial Chamber and full Senate elections respectively. Voter turnout was 79.1% in the Chamber of Representatives elections, although only 69,276 people were eligible to vote.

== Background ==
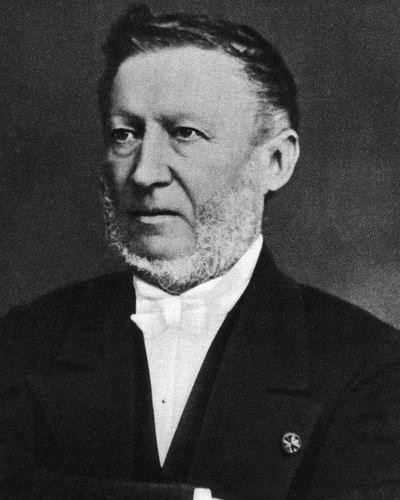
Jules Malou, Catholic leader

The election occurred during the First School War. The incumbent Liberal government under Walthère Frère-Orban aimed to secularize education, which sparked heavy protests from Catholics.

Regular partial elections for the Chamber of Representatives were held on Tuesday 10 June 1884, with a run-off on Tuesday 17 June. Under the alternating system, elections for the Chamber of Representatives were only held in five out of the nine provinces: Antwerp, Brabant, Luxembourg, Namur and West Flanders. Special elections were held in the arrondissements of Aalst and Sint-Niklaas, for one representative in each.

The result was a large victory for the Catholic Party. The Frère-Orban government resigned and was succeeded by a Catholic government led by Jules Malou, which immediately abolished the Ministry of Public Education.

The Liberals however retained a majority in the Senate, which was not up for election. It was subsequently dissolved, triggering its complete re-election. Senate elections were held on Tuesday 8 July 1884, with a run-off on Tuesday 15 July. The Catholic Party won 43 of the 69 seats in the Senate.

The election ended the First School War and marked the end of the last homogeneously liberal government. The Catholic Party under Jules Malou gained an absolute majority, which they would retain until the First World War.

== Campaign ==
Among the 69 Chamber seats up for election:

- 17 seats had uncontested Catholic candidates: Mechelen (3), Turnhout (3), Kortrijk (4), Roeselare (2), Tielt (2), Veurne (1), Diksmuide (1) and Bastogne (1).
- 11 seats were likely Catholic wins: Leuven (5), Ypres (3), Dinant (2) and Marche (1).
- 1 seat was likely Liberal: Arlon (1).
- 40 seats were competitive:
  - Antwerp (8), Nivelles (4) and Bruges (3) were historically competitive.
  - Namur (4), Philippeville (2), Neufchâteau (1), Virton (1) were competitive since the 1870s.
  - Brussels (16) was only since two years competitive.
  - Ostend (1), until now solidly liberal, was now competitive.

The Catholics gained 27 Chamber seats from the Liberals: 16 in Brussels, four in Nivelles, two in Namur, one in Philippeville, one in Antwerp, one in Ostend, one in Neufchâteau and one in Bruges. The Liberals only retained the single seats in Arlon and Virton, both in Luxembourg.

== Results ==
=== Chamber of Representatives ===
Party	Votes	%	Seats		
Party	Votes	%	Won	Total	+/–
Catholic Party	33,428	61.01	67	86	+27
Liberal Party	21,294	38.86	2	52	–27
Others	68	0.12	0	0	0
Total	54,790	100.00	69	138	0
Total votes	54,790	–			
Registered voters/turnout	69,276	79.09			
Source: Mackie & Rose, Sternberger et al.

=== Senate ===
Party	Seats	+/–
Catholic Party	43	+11
Liberal Party	26	–11
Total	69	0
Source: Sternberger et al.
