= Belgium and the Franco-Prussian War =

Activity during the 1870–71 European war

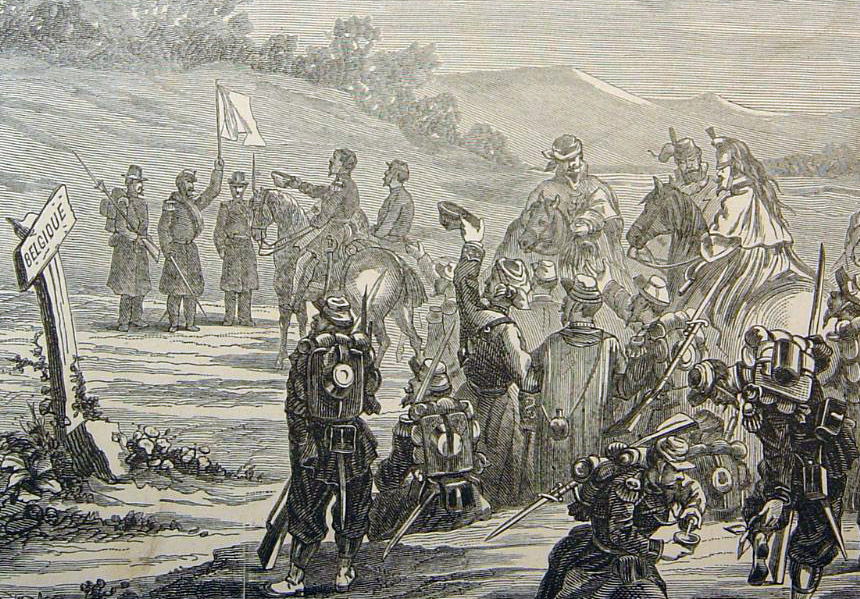
French troops approaching a small detachment of Belgian soldiers to seek internment in the aftermath of a nearby defeat, probably at the Battle of Sedan.

Belgium was not a belligerent in the Franco-Prussian War (1870–1871), as the country was neutral throughout the war, but was heavily influenced by the social and political effects of the conflict. An invasion of Belgian territory by either side was widely feared in 1870 and the Belgian Army was mobilised. The inadequacies which this revealed in Belgium's military and defensive preparations led to calls to reform the system of conscription and for a programme of fortification-building which would greatly influence the early phases of World War I.

== Belgium and the Crisis of 1870 ==
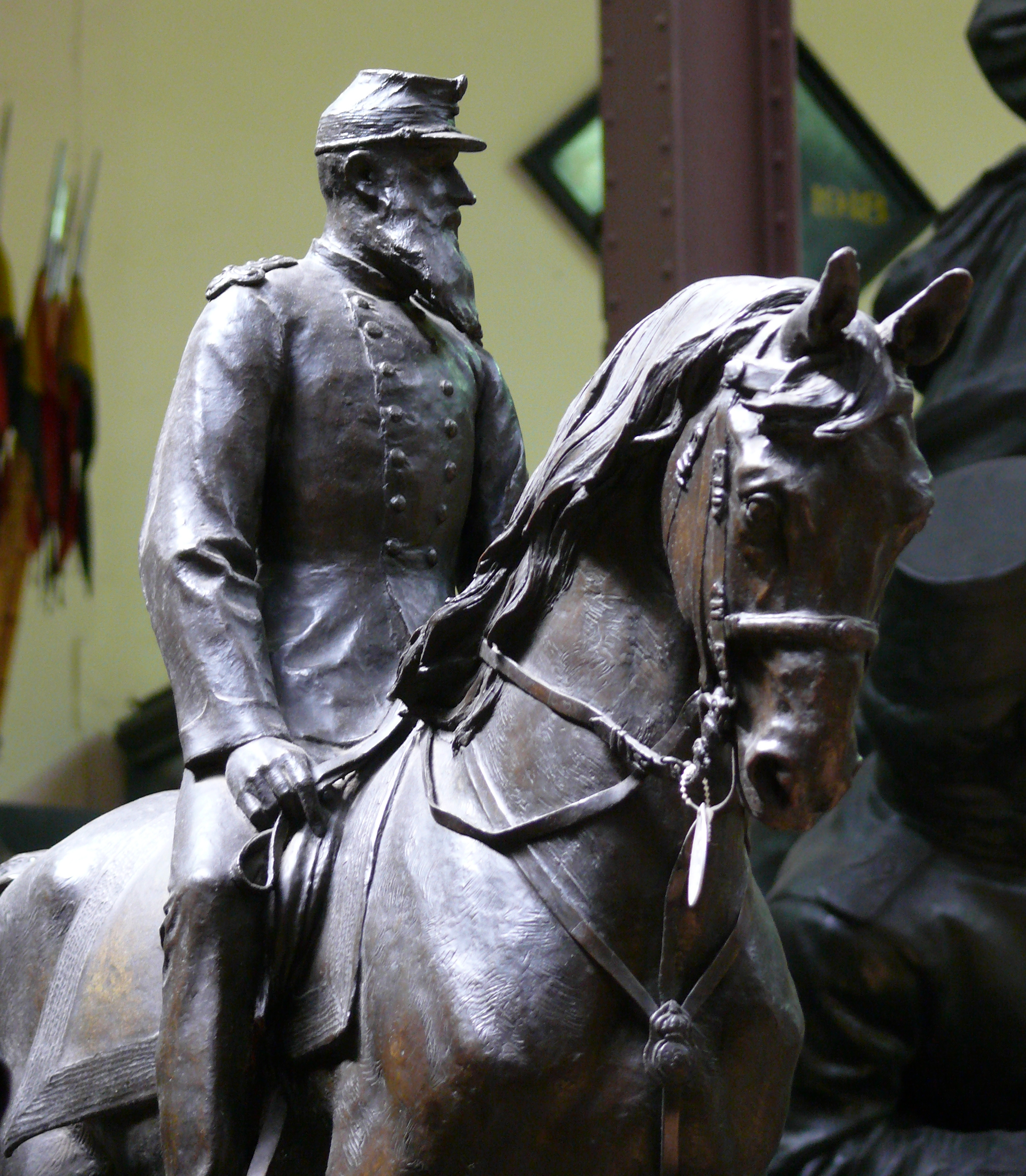
King Leopold II, shown in military uniform

The Treaty of London in 1839 had recognized Belgium as a sovereign state but committed it to a policy of perpetual neutrality. Its independence was intended to be guaranteed by the Belgian Army and the military intervention of the Treaty's signatory powers. However, there were doubts that the Treaty would be honoured if Belgium was attacked especially in the aftermath of the Luxembourg Crisis of 1867.

The outbreak of the Franco-Prussian War led King Leopold II and the government of Jules d'Anethan, installed only two weeks before the war's outbreak, to fear that Belgium would be invaded. A career staff officer, Major General Guillaume, was appointed as a non-partisan expert Minister of War in the new cabinet. The gold reserves of the National Bank were hurried to the National Redoubt at Antwerp before the news became public. When this leaked out, it caused panic.

The Belgian Army was called up on the 15 July, the same day that both French and German armies mobilised. The Belgian troops were divided into two armies; the Army of Antwerp (15,000 men) was tasked with guarding the fortresses at Antwerp and across Belgium while the Army of Observation (55,000 men) was tasked with defending the national borders.

Many military leaders feared that, even after the outbreak of hostilities, as both French and Prussian armies manoeuvred on the Belgian border, one of them would seek a strategic advantage by an outflanking attack through Belgium, and most believed the army incapable of fending off any such attack. Indeed, in the early part of the war, French Marshal Canrobert brought an entire Army Corps (4 infantry divisions) to Châlons-sur-Marne in northern France as a reserve and to guard against any Prussian advance through Belgium. Despite key battles taking place very close to Belgian territory, including the Battle of Sedan just a few miles from the border, Belgium was never actually attacked.

In order to avoid giving the impression of belligerence in the conflict, Leopold requested that the French not commit Belgian members of the French Foreign Legion during the conflict. The French agreed and Belgian legionnaires remained in their base in French Algeria while their comrades were deployed to the front. The decision outraged the other legionaries and the Legion's march, Le Boudin, makes repeated reference to the fact that the Belgians "[only] shoot from their rear-end" ("tireurs au cul") because of it.

== Legacy ==
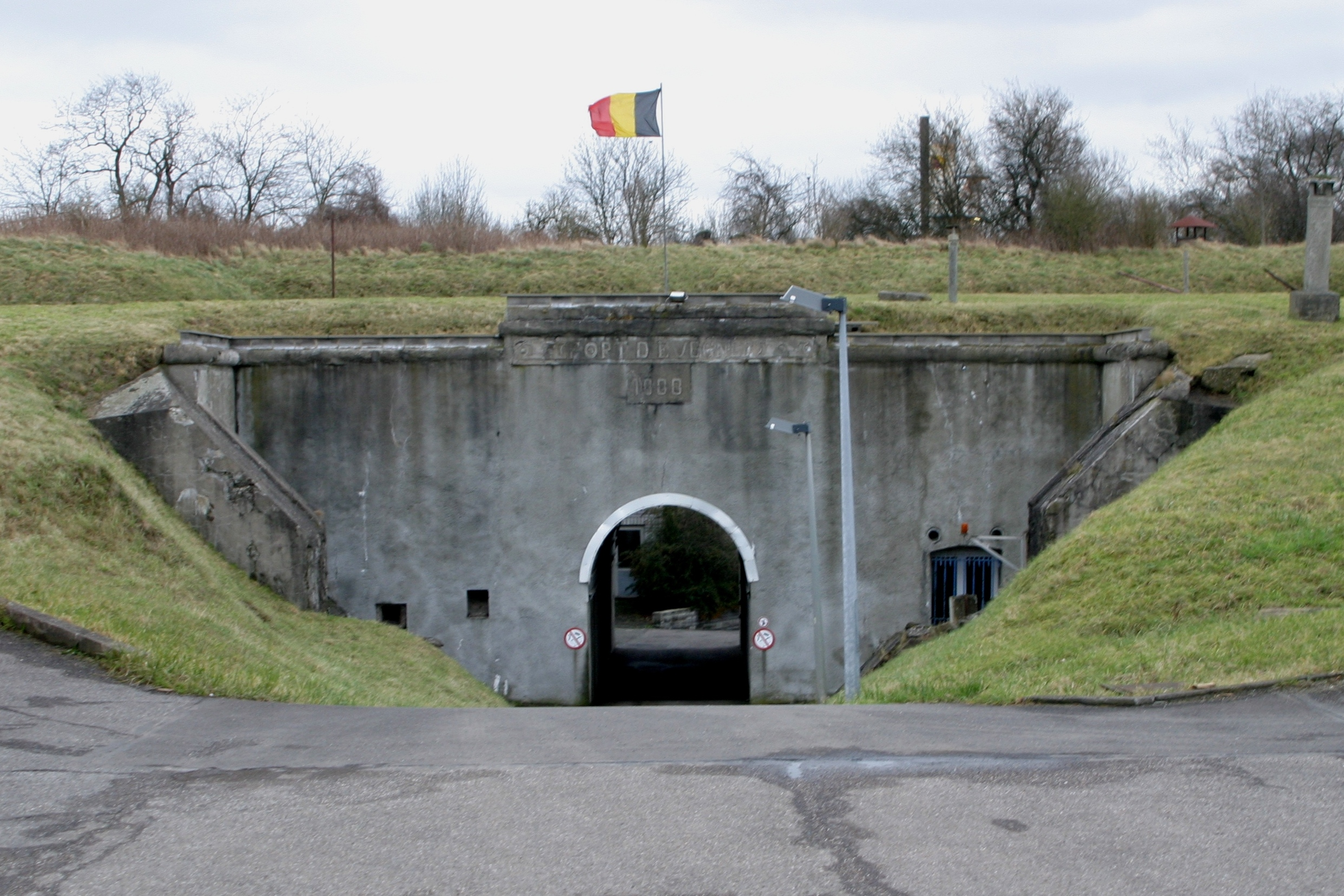
Entry to the Fort d'Évegnée near Liège built in the 1880s, following the crisis of 1870–1871

The Franco-Prussian War made Belgians acutely aware of the precarious situation of their country in the event of another war between the two powers. In the years following the conflict, there was widespread modernisation of the military. The system of Remplacement (whereby wealthy Belgians conscripted into the military could pay for a "replacement" to do their military service instead), which had been viewed as a crucial personal liberty by many Belgians was abolished, and an improved system of conscription implemented. These reforms, led by d'Anethan and under pressure from Leopold II, divided Belgian politics. The Catholics united with the Liberals under Walthère Frère-Orban to oppose them, and the reforms were finally defeated when d'Anethan's government fell during an unrelated scandal.

Eventually, the military was reformed. The 1909 System abolished the inefficient system of Remplacement, instituting compulsory military service of eight years' service in the front lines and five years in the reserves. This swelled the size of the Belgian army to over 100,000 well-trained men. Construction of a chain of forts along Belgium's borders was intensified, and led to a series of very modern fortifications, including the so-called "National redoubt" at Antwerp, at Liège and Namur, many of them designed by the great Belgian fortress architect, Henri Alexis Brialmont.

A commemorative medal, the 1870–71 Commemorative Medal, was inaugurated to the veterans of the conflict in 1911.

== See also ==
- British ambulances in the Franco-Prussian War
- Belgian Legion in Mexico (1866)
- Papal Zouaves (1861–1870)
