= Sir Thomas Gabriel, 1st Baronet =

British timber merchant

Sir Thomas Gabriel
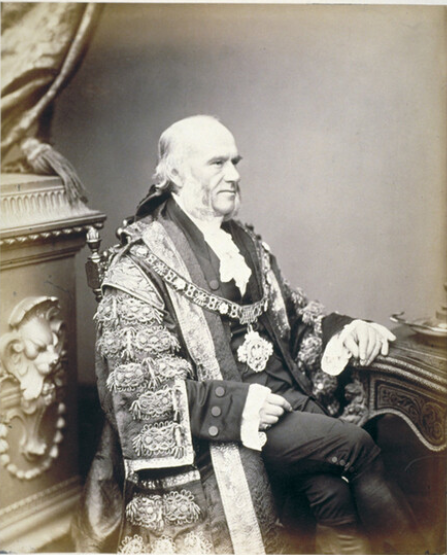
- Portrait of Sir Thomas Gabriel, c. 1866

Lord Mayor of London

1st Baronet of Edgecombe Hall
- In office 1866–1867

Personal details
- Born: 5 November 1811
- Died: 23 February 1891 (aged 79)
- Occupation: Timber merchant

Sir Thomas Gabriel, 1st Baronet (5 November 1811 – 23 February 1891), was a British timber merchant.

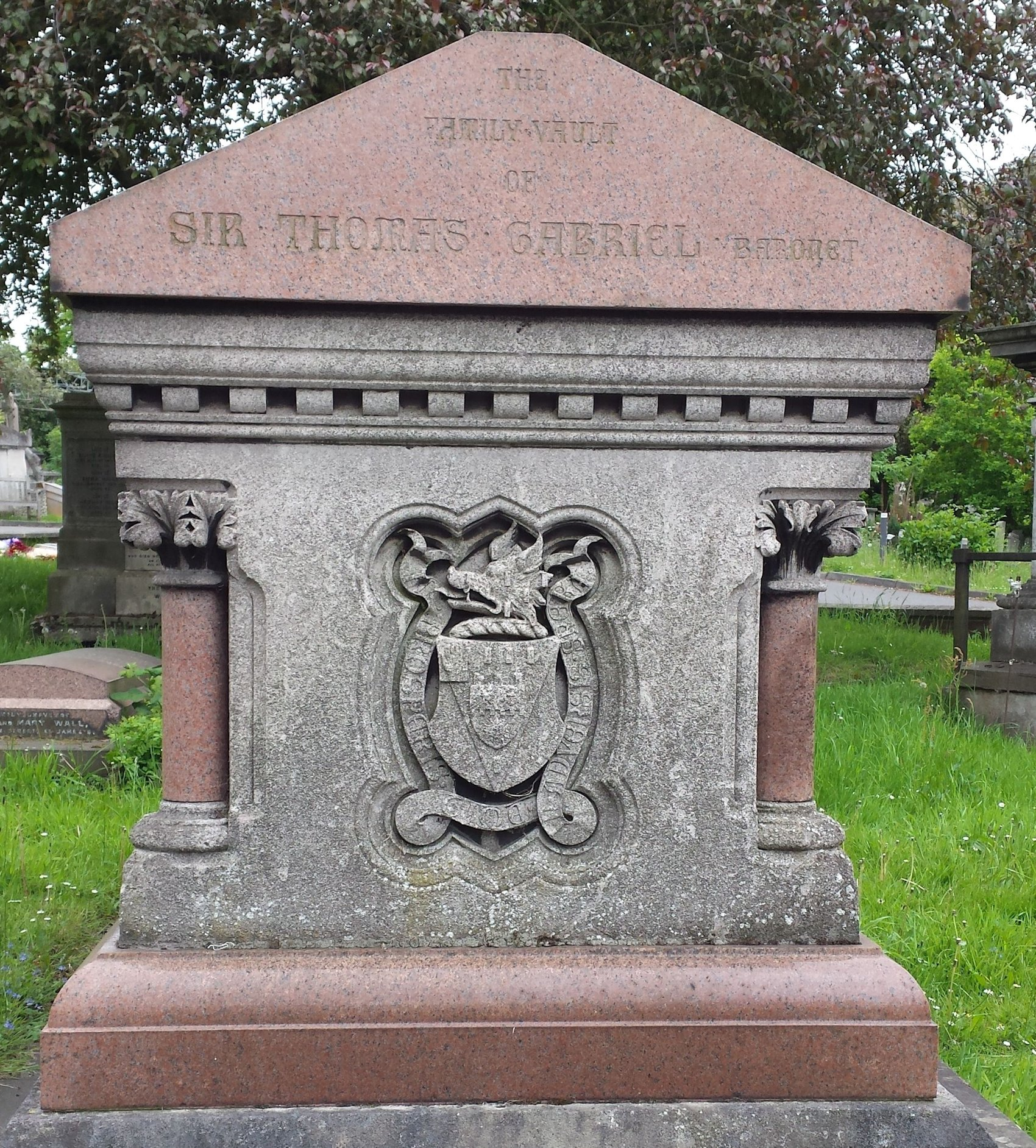
Sir Thomas Gabriel's grave at West Norwood Cemetery, London

Gabriel was the grandson of Christopher Gabriel, a distinguished plane maker.

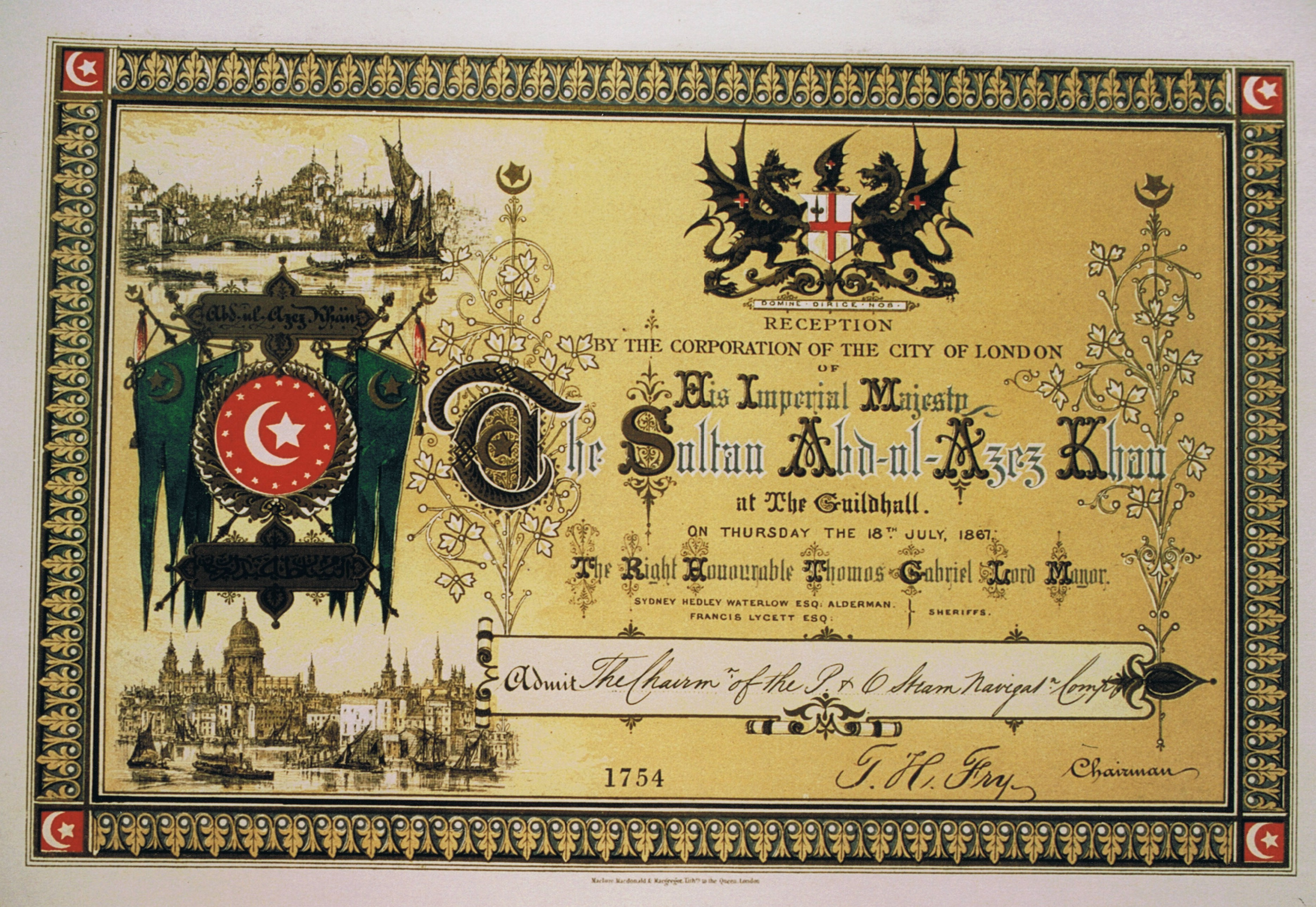
Admission ticket to Lord Mayor Thomas Gabriel's reception of H.I.M. The Sultan Abd-ul-Aziz Khan at The Guildhall, 18 July 1867 issued to the Chairman of P. & O. Navigation Company.

He was a partner of Thomas Gabriel and Sons and Burtons, timber importers and merchants, of Gabriels Wharf. He served as Sheriff of London and Middlesex for 1859–60 and Lord Mayor of London for 1866–67. Soon after his term as Lord Mayor he was created a baronet (of Edgecombe Hall in the County of Surrey), the customary honour given to holders of that office.

Gabriel was buried at West Norwood Cemetery after he died in February 1891, aged 79. The baronetcy died with him.

Gabriel is the great-great-great-uncle of singer-songwriter Peter Gabriel (Sir Thomas Gabriel's brother, Christopher Trowell Gabriel, was Peter Gabriel's great-great-grandfather).

Coat of arms of Sir Thomas Gabriel, 1st Baronet
Crest On a mount Vert a boar's head erased Sable billety Or. Escutcheon Sable on a pile Or ten billets four three two and one of the field. Motto In Prosperis Time In Adversis Spera (Fear In Prosperity, Hope In Adversity)

Honorary titles
Preceded by Benjamin Phillips	Lord Mayor of London; 1866–1867	Succeeded by William Ferneley Allen
Baronetage of the United Kingdom
New creation	Baronet (of Edgecombe Hall); 1867–1891	Extinct
