= Joseph Kervyn de Lettenhove =

Belgian historian and politician

Joseph, Baron Kervyn de Lettenhove
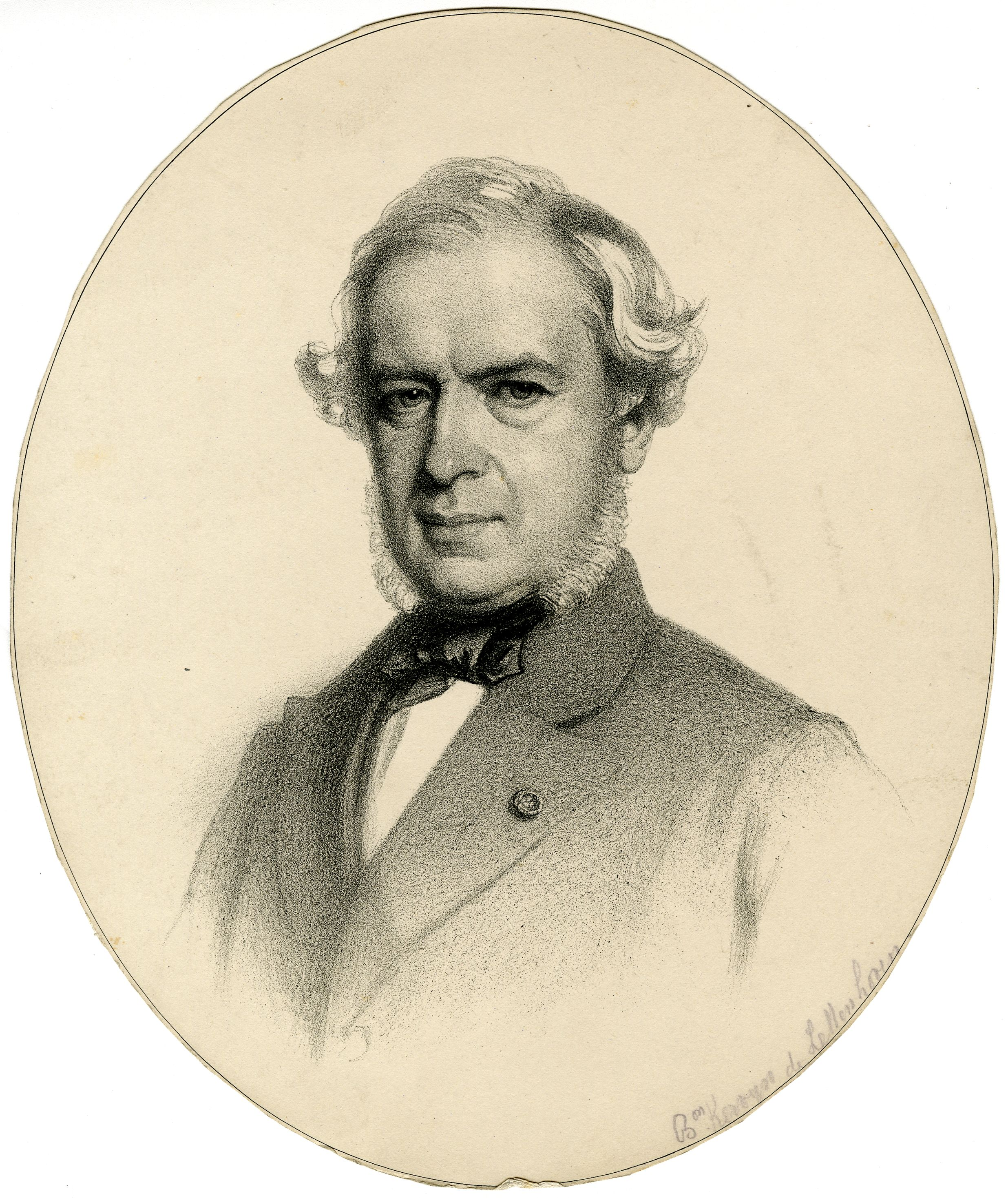
- Born: 17 August 1817; Sint-Michiels, Belgium
- Died: 3 April 1891 (aged 73); Sint-Michiels, Belgium
- Occupations: historian, politician

Joseph-Marie-Bruno-Constantin, Baron Kervyn de Lettenhove (17 August 1817 – 3 April 1891) was a Belgian historian and politician.

He was a member of the Catholic Constitutional party and sat in the Belgian Chamber of Deputies as member for Eeklo. In 1870 he was appointed a member of the cabinet of Jules Joseph d'Anethan as minister of the interior. However his official career was short. The cabinet appointed as governor of Limburg one Decker, who had been entangled in the financial speculations of Langand-Dumonceau by which the whole clerical party had been discredited, and which provoked riots. The cabinet was forced to resign, and thereafter Kervyn de Lettenhove devoted himself entirely to literature and history.

He had already become known as the author of a book on Jean Froissart (Brussels, 1855), which was crowned by the French Academy. He was also a correspondent of foreign scientific societies, and preëminent in his own country as an investigator of the national antiquities. He made translations of some of Milton's shorter poems (1839) and edited the Lettres et négociations de Philippe de Commines (1867).

He edited a series of chronicles: Chroniques relatives à l'histoire de la Belgique sous la domination des ducs de Bourgogne (Brussels, 1870–1873), Rélations politiques des Pays Bas et de l'Angleterre sous le regne de Philippe II (Brussels, 1882–1892), and L'Oeuvre de Georges Chastellain (Brussels, 1863–1866). He wrote a history of Les Huguenots et les Gueux (Bruges, 1883–1885) in the spirit of a violent Roman Catholic partisan, but with much industry and learning. Other works include:

- Histoire de la Flandre (1847–50)
- Jacques de Artevelde (1863)
- Histoire et croniques de Flandre (1879–80)
- Marie Stuart (1889)

He died at Sint-Michiels near Bruges in 1891, the community in which he was born in 1817. One of his children was art historian Henri Kervyn de Lettenhove.
