= Euphrosine Beernaert =

Belgian painter (1831–1901)

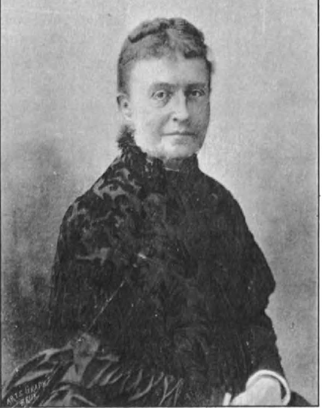
- Born: 11 April 1831; Ostend, Belgium
- Died: 7 July 1901 (aged 70); Ixelles, Belgium
- Known for: Painting

Euphrosine Beernaert (11 April 1831 – 7 July 1901) was a Belgian landscape painter.

== Life ==
Beernaerts was born at Ostend in 1831, and studied under Pierre-Louis Kuhnen in Brussels. She travelled in Germany, France, and Italy, and exhibited landscapes at Brussels, Antwerp, and Paris, her favorite subjects being Dutch. In 1873, she won a medal at Vienna; in 1875, a gold medal at the Brussels Salon; and still other medals at Philadelphia (1876), Sydney (1879), and Teplitz (1879). She was made Chevalier de l'Ordre de Leopold in 1881.

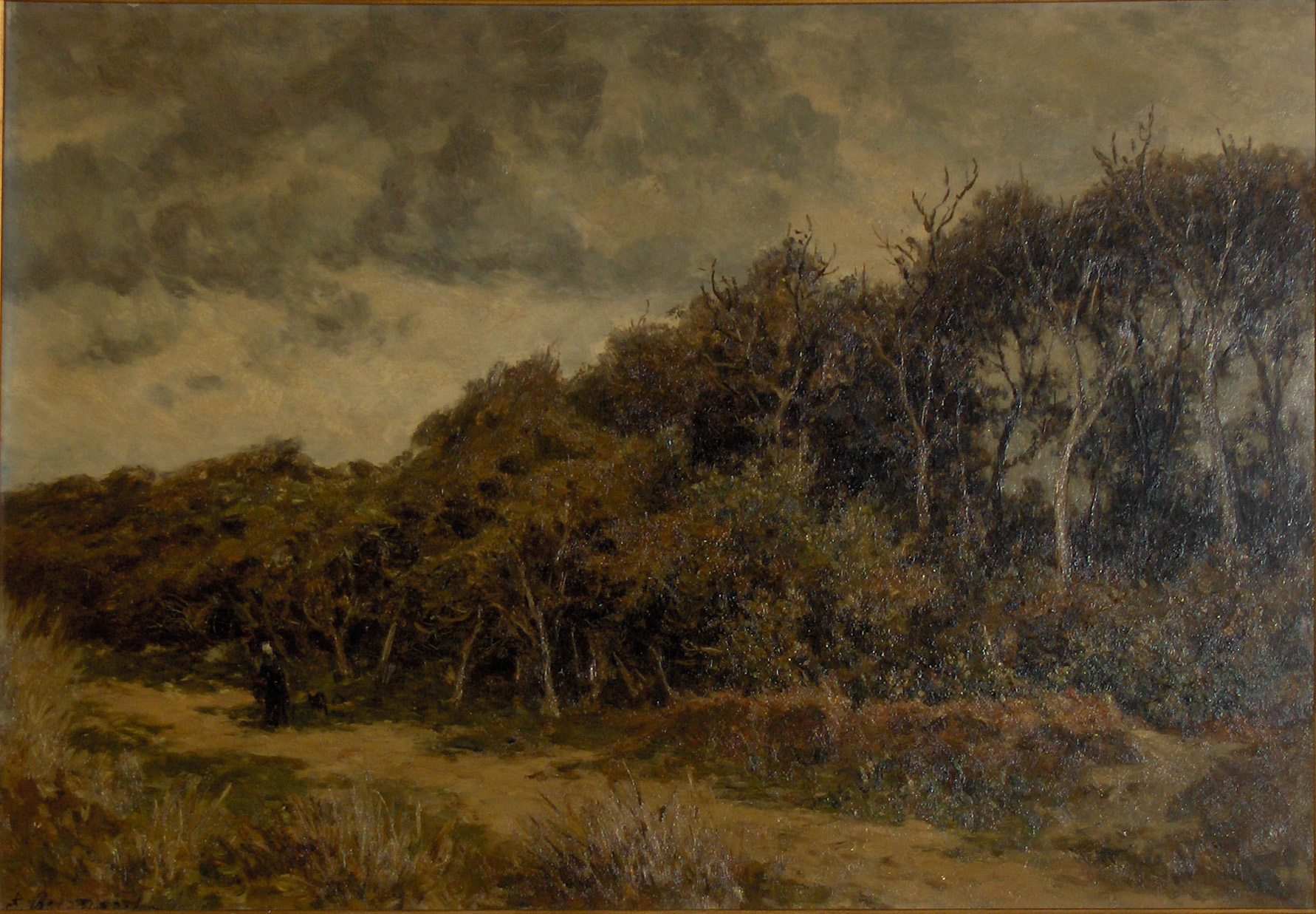
View of a forest with walkers

In 1878, the following pictures by her were shown in Paris: "Lisiere de bois dans les Dunes (Zelande)," "Le Village de Domburg (Zelande)," and "Interieur de bois a Oost-Kapel (Holland)." Other well-known works are "Die Campine" and "Aus der Umgebung von Oosterbeck". Beernaert exhibited her work at the Palace of Fine Arts and The Woman's Building at the 1893 World's Columbian Exposition in Chicago, Illinois. She died in Ixelles in 1901.
