= Henri Guillaume =

French-born Belgian army officer and military historian

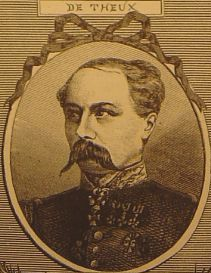
General Guillaume as Minister of War in the cabinet led by Barthélémy de Theux de Meylandt (1872)

Baron Henri Louis Gustave Guillaume (1812–1877), generally going by Gustave Guillaume, was a French-born Belgian army officer and military historian who served as Minister of War from 1870 to 1873.

== Life ==
Guillaume was born in Amiens, France, on 5 March 1812. He was living in Charleroi when the Belgian Revolution broke out in 1830, and immediately joined the revolutionary forces, becoming secretary to Léonard Greindl (a future minister of war) just as the surrender of the Dutch garrison in Charleroi was being negotiated. On 20 October he was appointed second lieutenant in the 3rd Regiment of the Line.

In 1837 Guillaume transferred to the 8th Regiment of the Line with the rank of captain (second class), and the following year to the newly formed Grenadier Regiment. On 27 November 1843 he was sent the Royal Military Academy, and on 19 July 1845 promoted to captain (first class). On 23 June 1846 he was seconded to the military personnel department of the Ministry of War. He was promoted to the rank of major on 6 April 1849, lieutenant-colonel on 24 June 1853, colonel on 1 August 1855, and major general on 15 July 1863, despite never having had effective command of more than a company.

In 1851 he had married the 19-year-old Cécile-Antoinette Engler. They had three sons. Guillaume was elected a corresponding member of the Royal Academy of Science, Letters and Fine Arts of Belgium on 9 May 1860, and a full member on 6 May 1867. From 1865 he sat on the editorial committee of the Biographie Nationale de Belgique, which he chaired from 1869 to 1877. In 1875 he became director of the academy's "Classe des Lettres et des Sciences morales et politiques".

Guillaume resigned from the ministry on 3 January 1868 to take up a position as aide de camp to King Leopold II. Up to 1872 he was involved in royal projects for the expansion of Belgian trade with China and Japan. In July 1870 he was appointed Minister of War in the government led by Jules d'Anethan, in the midst of the international crisis of the Franco-Prussian War. The Belgian Army was mobilised on 15 July to prevent incursions into Belgian territory by either side in the conflict, only returning to a peace footing on 3 March 1871. Guillaume was raised to the rank of lieutenant general on 20 March. He continued as minister under Barthélémy de Theux de Meylandt, pushing for the government to abolish the system of remplacement that allowed wealthy conscripts to pay for somebody else to serve in their place. His failure to obtain reform of the conscription law led to his resignation from the government on 10 December 1872. He remained in place as acting minister until his successor was appointed the following year.

He was ennobled by letters patent of 20 January 1873, and briefly served as head of the War College within the Royal Military Academy. He retired from the army on 14 May 1877. He died in Ixelles on 7 November the same year, and was buried on 10 November. Five eulogies were given at his funeral, with Alphonse Wauters, General Goethals and General Bartels among the speakers.

== Publications ==
- Essai sur l'organisation d'une armée de volontaires (1850)
- Histoire des bandes d'ordonnance des Pays-Bas (1873)
- Histoire de l'infanterie wallonne sous la maison d'Espagne, 1500–1800 (1878)
