= 1870–71 Commemorative Medal =

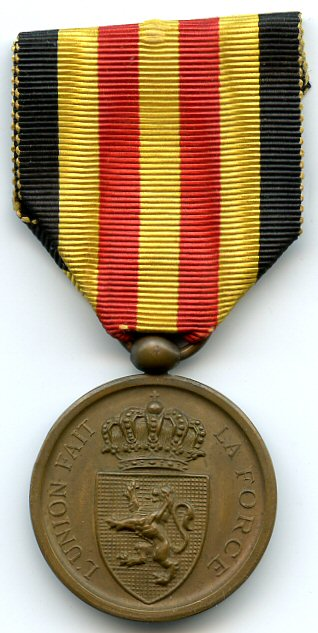
- 1870–71 Commemorative Medal (obverse)
- Type: War medal
- Awarded for: Service in the army during the Franco-Prussian war
- Presented by: Kingdom of Belgium
- Eligibility: Belgian citizens
- Status: No longer awarded
- Established: 20 September 1911
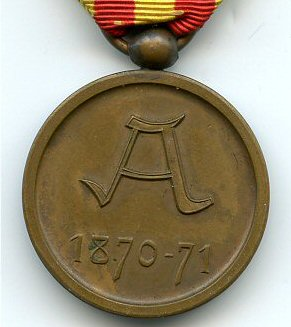
- Reverse of the medal

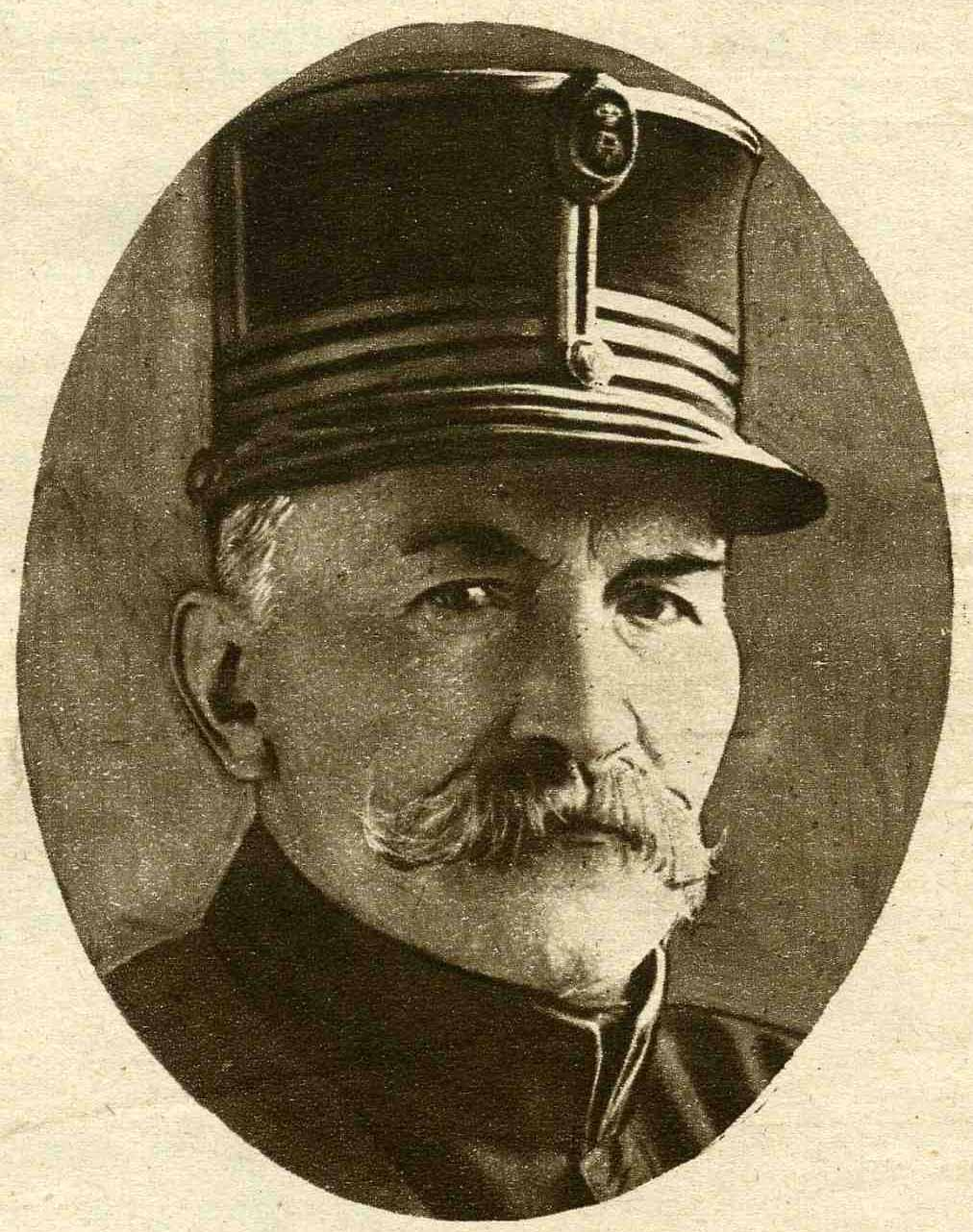
General Gérard Leman, a recipient of the 1870–71 Commemorative Medal

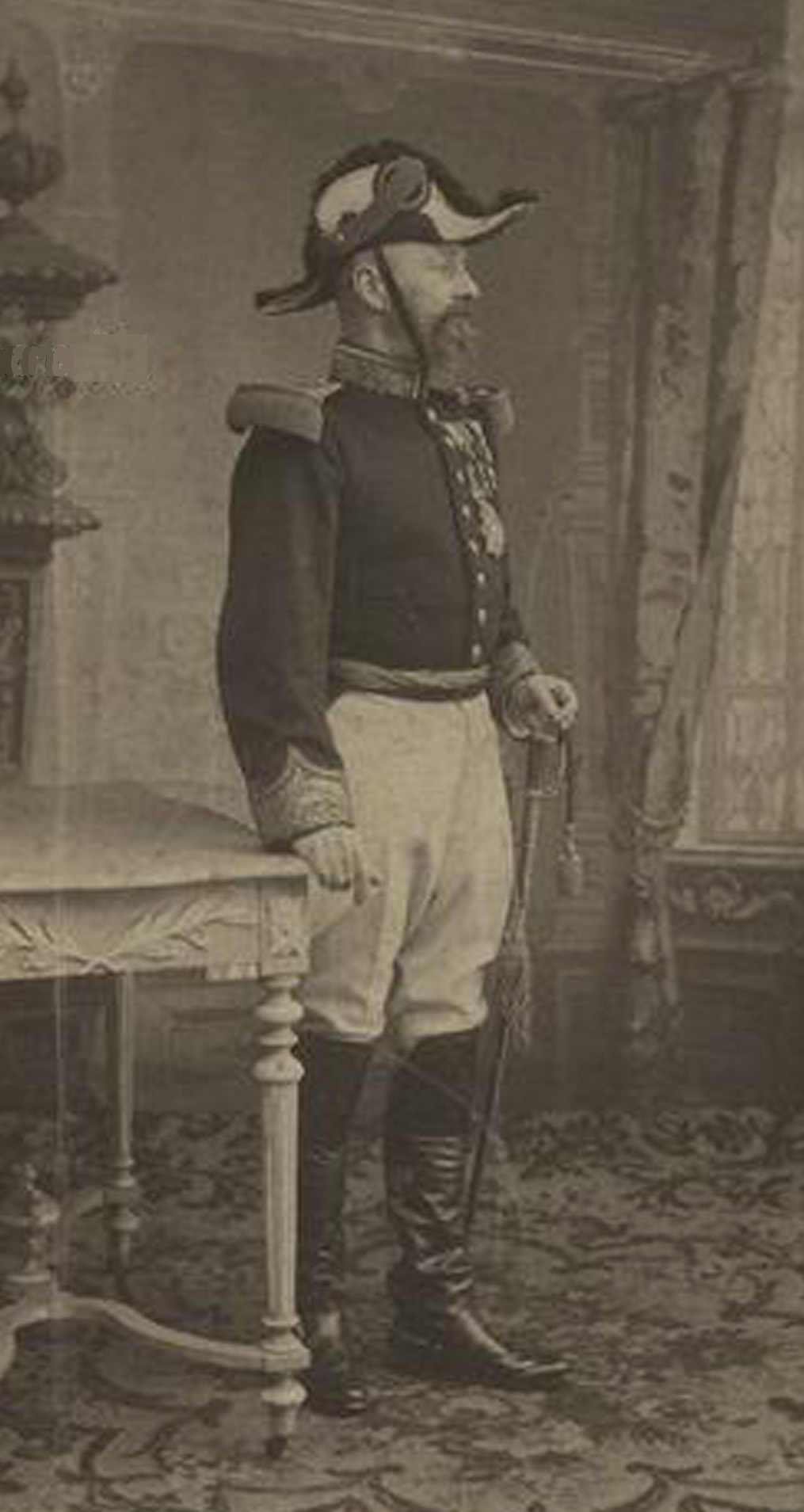
Lieutenant General Charles-Marie Braconnier, a recipient of the 1870–71 Commemorative Medal

The 1870–71 Commemorative Medal (French: Médaille Commémorative 1870–71, Dutch: Herinneringsmedaille 1870–71) was a Belgian campaign medal established by royal decree on 20 September 1911 and awarded to all members of the Belgian Army who were mobilized during the period from 15 July 1870 to 5 March 1871 during the Franco-Prussian War.

== Award description ==
The 1870–71 Commemorative Medal was a 32mm in diameter circular bronze medal with raised edges on both sides. Its obverse bore the escutcheon of the Coat of arms of Belgium under a royal crown. To the left and right, along the circumference of the medal, the relief inscription "L'UNION FAIT LA FORCE" ("Strength through unity"). The reverse bore a stylised relief capital letter A, the monogram of King Albert I of Belgium over the years 1870–71 also inscribed in relief.

The medal was suspended by a ring through the suspension loop from a 35mm wide silk moiré ribbon divided into seven equal 5mm wide longitudinal stripes, black, light green, red, light green, red, light green and black.

== Notable recipients (partial list) ==
The individuals listed below were awarded the 1870–71 Commemorative Medal:

- Lieutenant General Harry Jungbluth
- Lieutenant General Sir Antonin de Selliers de Moranville
- Lieutenant General Count Gérard-Mathieu Leman
- Lieutenant General Georges Guiette
- Lieutenant General Albert Lantonnois van Rode
- Cavalry Lieutenant General Fernand du Roy de Blicquy
- Lieutenant General Baron Théophile Wahis
- Lieutenant General Louis Cuvelier
- Lieutenant General Baron Albert Donny
- Lieutenant General Emile Libbrecht
- Cavalry Lieutenant General Count Frédéric van der Stegen de Putte
- Cavalry Major General Count Théodore-Louis d’Oultremont
- Major General Louis Mory
- Lieutenant General Charles-Marie Braconnier
- Lieutenant General Firmin Joseph de Bray
- Lieutenant General Auguste Alexandre Corneille De Ceuninck
- Lieutenant General Constant Joseph Alfred Demarest
- Lieutenant General Henri Pierre Lambert George
- Lieutenant General Joseph Hellebaut
- Lieutenant General Augustin Houbion
- Lieutenant General Jacques Eugène Muller
- Lieutenant General Paul Timmermans
- Lieutenant General Alexandre Cousebandt d’Alkemade
- Lieutenant General Count de T’Serclaes de Wommersom
- Lieutenant General Henri Louis Laurent Clooten
- Cavalry Colonel Baron Raoul Snoy

== See also ==
- Belgium and the Franco-Prussian War
- Franco-Prussian War
- Orders, decorations, and medals of Belgium

== Other sources ==
- Quinot H., 1950, Recueil illustré des décorations belges et congolaises, 4e Edition. (Hasselt)
- Cornet R., 1982, Recueil des dispositions légales et réglementaires régissant les ordres nationaux belges. 2e Ed. N.pl., (Brussels)
- Borné A.C., 1985, Distinctions honorifiques de la Belgique, 1830-1985 (Brussels)
