= August 1870 Belgian general election =

Belgian general election, August 1870
- 2 August 1870

All 124 seats in the Chamber of Representatives 63 seats needed for a majority
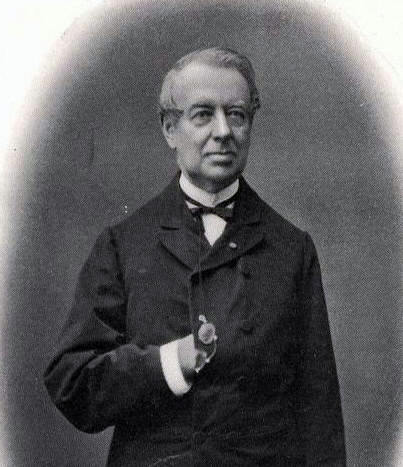

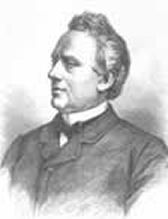
	First party	Second party
Leader	Jules d'Anethan	Walthère Frère-Orban
Party	Catholic	Liberal
Leader since	Candidate for PM	Candidate for PM
Seats before	61 seats	61 seats
Seats won	72	52
Seat change	▲11	▼9
Popular vote	39,705	32,448
Percentage	54.49%	44.53%
Government before election
d'Anethan
Catholic
Government after election
d'Anethan
Catholic

Early general elections were held in Belgium on 2 August 1870, the second that year after the partial elections in June had ended with both the Catholic Party and the Liberal Party holding 61 seats each. The result was a victory for the Catholic Party, which won 72 of the 124 seats in the Chamber of Representatives and 34 of the 62 seats in the Senate. Voter turnout was 68%, although only 107,099 people (2.1% of the population) were eligible to vote.

== Results ==
=== Chamber of Representatives ===
Party	Votes	%	Seats	+/–
Catholic Party	39,705	54.49	72	+11
Liberal Party	32,448	44.53	52	–9
Others	720	0.99	0	New
Total	72,873	100.00	124	+2
Total votes	72,873	–		
Registered voters/turnout	107,099	68.04		
Source: Mackie & Rose, Sternberger et al.

=== Senate ===
Party	Seats
Catholic Party	34
Liberal Party	27
Independents	1
Total	62
Source: Sternberger et al.

== See also ==
- Belgium and the Franco-Prussian War
