= Henri Kervyn de Lettenhove =

Belgian lawyer, amateur architect and art historian

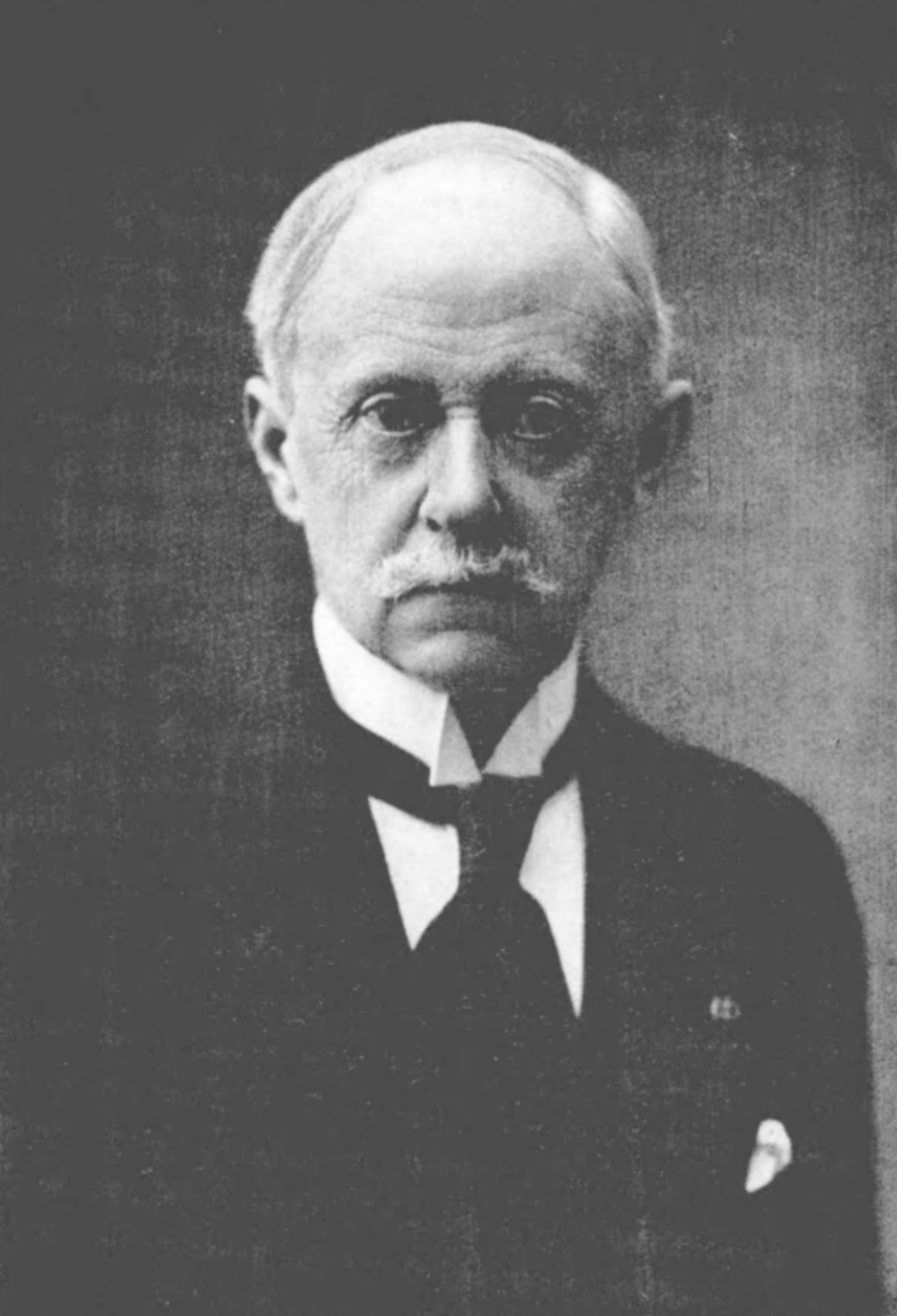
Henri Kervyn de Lettenhove

Henri Marie Bruno Joseph Léon, Baron Kervyn De Lettenhove (1856–1928; sometimes styled Henry instead) was a Belgian lawyer and amateur architect and art historian.

== Life ==
He was born in 1856 to Baron Joseph Kervyn de Lettenhove, historian and politician.

== Works ==
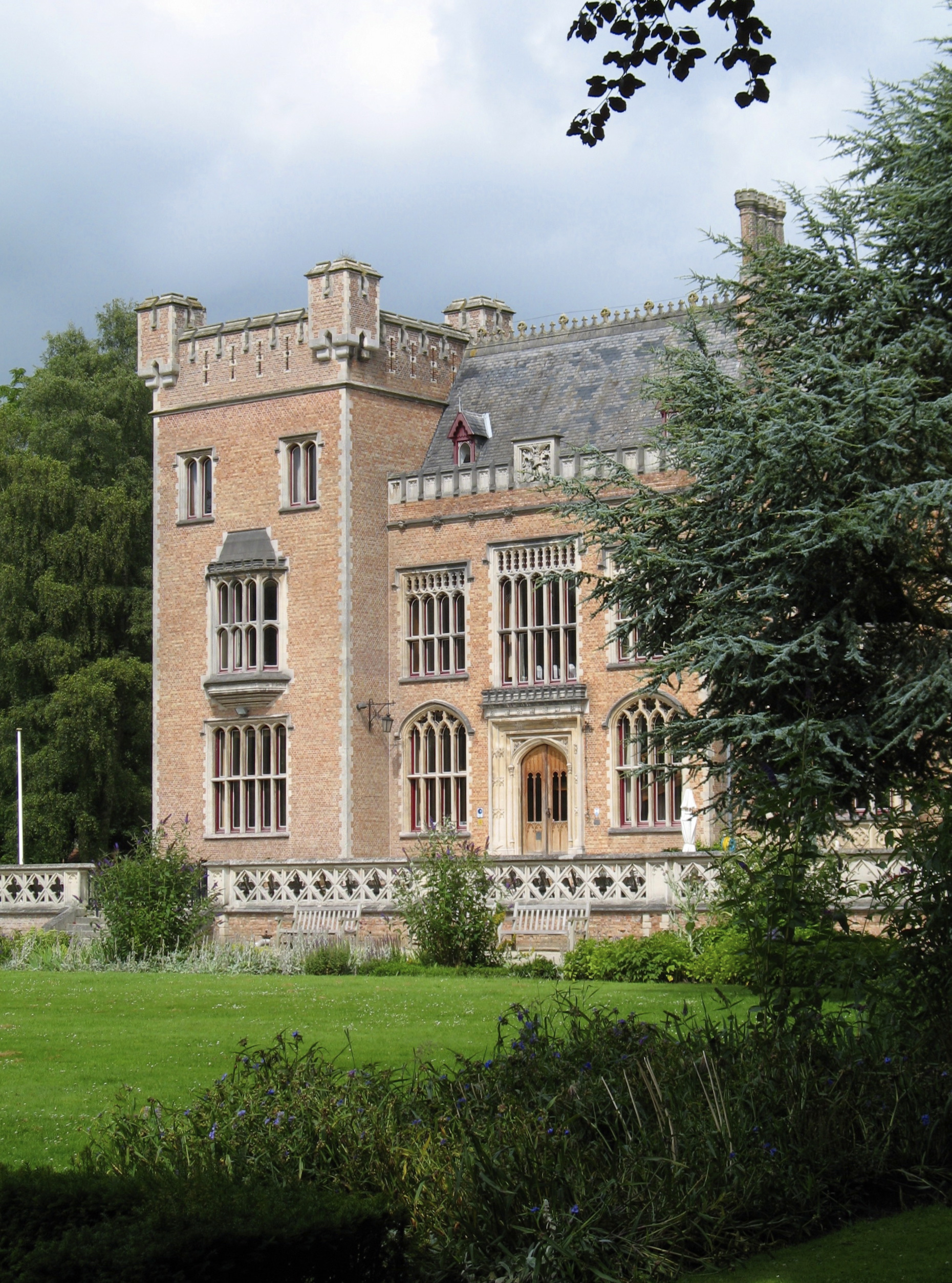
Castle Tudor, in Sint-Andries, near Bruges

=== Architecture ===
- Castle Tudor, in Sint-Andries, near Bruges, built in 1904-06 for Stanislas van Outryve d’Ydewalle
- Concept for the World War I memorial in the Sint-Lodewijkscollege in Brugge

=== Books and articles ===
- 1907: La toison d'or : notes sur l'institution et l'histoire de l'ordre, depuis l'année 1429 jusqu'à l'année 1559 (edited)
- 1908: Les chefs-d'oeuvre d'art ancien à l'Exposition de la Toison d'or à Bruges en 1907 (with others)
- 1912: L'exposition de la miniature (introduction)
- 1917: La guerre et les oeuvres d'art en Belgique : 1914–1916

=== Organisations ===
He presided over multiple exhibitions in Bruges, including:

- 1902: Exposition des primitifs flamands à Bruges
- 1908: Bruges - ses peintres

He was also involved with other exhibitions, like the 1907 exhibition of the Golden Fleece in Bruges, a 1910 exhibition in Brussels of 17th century Belgian painting, and a 1912 exhibition on miniature painting.

He was one of the founding members of the "Museum van de Nijverheidskunst" in het Huis de Roode Steen in Bruges, founded in 1908 but only opened to the public in 1911. He was also one of the driving forces behind the Groeningemuseum, but due to the many delays, including the first World War, it only opened after his death.

He was a member of the Royal Commission for Monuments and Sites.
