= Charles-Marie de Braconnier =

Belgian soldier (1849–1917)

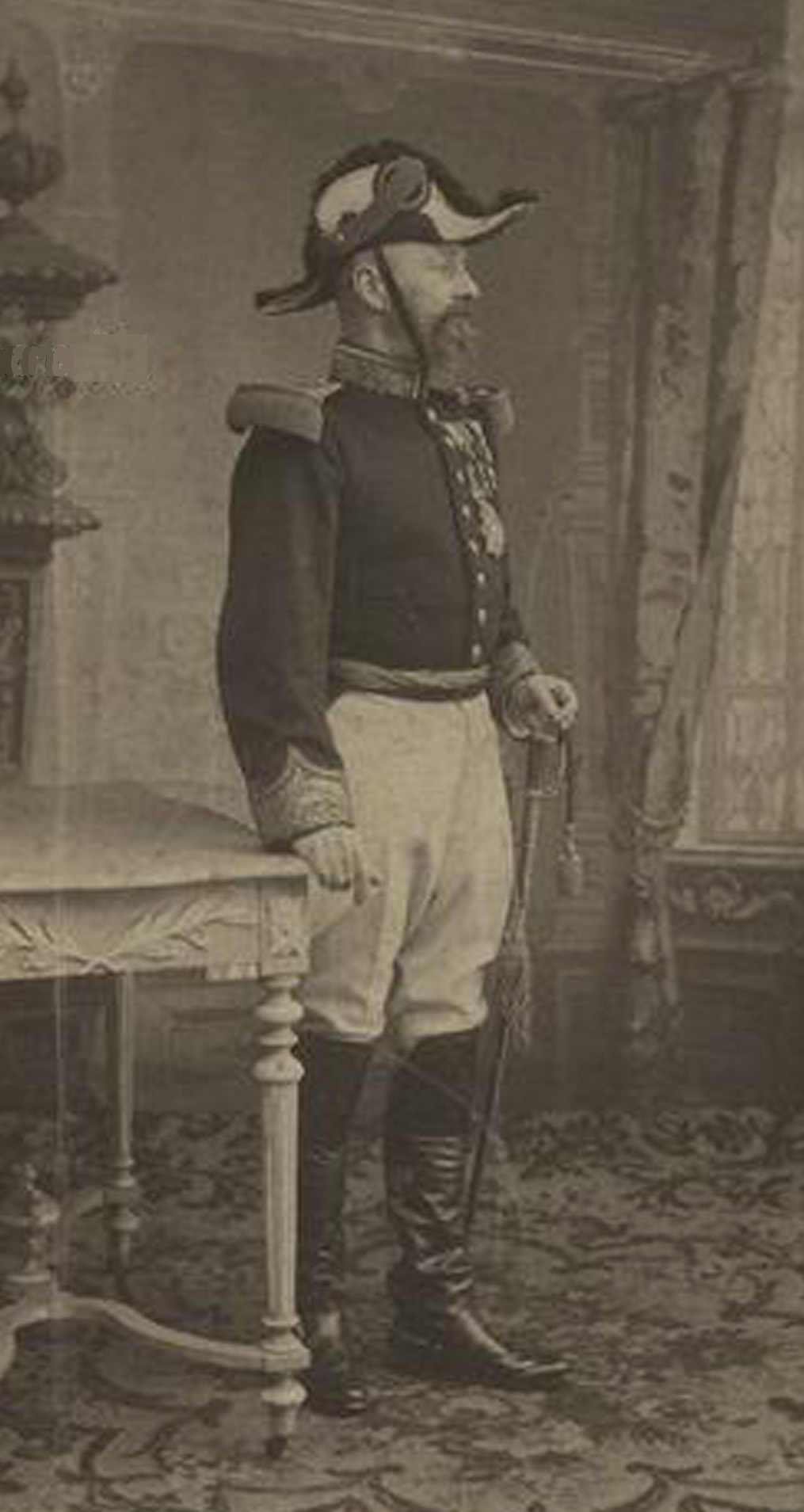
- General Charles-Marie (de) Braconnier in 1911
- Born: 28 June 1849; Arlon, Luxembourg (Belgium)
- Died: 13 March 1917 (aged 67); Loosduinen, Netherlands
- Occupations: Soldier, explorer
- Known for: First commander of Léopoldville

General Charles-Marie de Braconnier, or Carlos Braconnier (28 June 1849 – 13 March 1917) was a Belgian soldier who participated in the expeditions led by Henry Morton Stanley and was the founder and first commander of the station of Léopoldville.

== Family ==
Arms of the Braconnier family

General Braconnier came from a family of Ancien Régime nobility that originated in the Duchy of Lorraine. In the 16th century one of his ancestors, the knight Jean de Braconnier, was master alderman and member of the parliament of Metz. During 1789 the Braconniers had to leave France to escape the massacres of the French Revolution. Charles-Marie was thus the heir to a line of officers of French origin who put themselves in the service of the young Kingdom of Belgium, whose army was sorely lacking in experienced officers during its independence in 1831.

Charles-Marie de Braconnier was born in Arlon on 28 June 1849. His parents were Charles Michel Louis Braconnier and Éléonore Zélie Aimée de Fraudigney. His father was a veteran of the 1839 campaign against the Netherlands. Born into a military family, his brother, Colonel Léon de Braconnier, also served in the Congo.

In 1885, he married Valentine Mosselman at Sainval Castle, niece of MP Octave Neef-Orban and cousin of Senator Theodore Mosselman of Chenoy.

== Military career ==
Charles-Marie Braconnier entered the Military School on 4 December 1867, first entered the artillery regiment, then was incorporated into the 1st Regiment of Lancers. As such, he took part in the campaign of the Belgian observation army stationed between Namur and the Ardennes under the command of General Pierre Emmanuel Félix Chazal to resist a possible Prussian incursion into Belgium during the Franco-Prussian War of 1870.

On 21 September 1875 he entered the School of War. He was appointed lieutenant and then captain in the 4th Regiment of Lancers, then enlisted in the International African Association.

== Exploration of the Congo ==
On 15 August 1880 Braconnier left Liverpool aboard the Gaboon, accompanied by Paul Nève, Victor Harou, Edmond Hanssens and Louis Valcke. In mid-September, he arrived in the Congo and reached Vivi at the end of September 1880. Henry Morton Stanley was waiting for him. Braconnier, Stanley and Harou embarked on the Royal, a ship commanded by Anderson, and sailed upstream to establish new stations at Manyanga and the Pool. At Isangila they were joined by Nève, the mechanic for the En Avant, and Flamini, the engineer for the Royal. They left for Manyanga with both steamers, and with a lighter and a whaling boat in tow.

Most of the members of the expedition came down with fever. They arrived at the Ntombo-Mataka falls on 1 May 1881, where Stanley founded the Manyanga station, which he entrusted to Harou. Braconnier was charged with finding a route from Manyanga to the mouth of the Lufu River, bypassing the Ntombo-Mataka falls. Valcke came to join the group having brought all the floating material destined for the Pool some distance upstream of the falls. Stanley fell ill with fever and was nursed by Braconnier. From the first days of June, Stanley and Braconnier began preparations for the march to Stanley-Pool. Nève died around this time.

On 15 July Captain Braconnier left as a scout, commanding a large troop of natives. He was joined by Stanley at Mungala, on the north bank of the river. The troops had to climb the steep slopes of Ngoma with wagons carrying the dismantled parts of a riverboat. Then they had to cross deep rivers, such as the Nkondo River. They crossed the Zinga district, inhabited by the Babouende people. On 24 July 1881 they reached Ngoma, near the Inkissi Falls. They had to climb the steep slopes of Ngoma with their enormous wagons dragged by twenty-four to thirty mules. They also had to unload the wagons and ford deep rivers with strong currents, such as the Nkonko River.

Braconnier led a team of workers to cut a route through the forest, and was the first in the expedition to see the Stanley Pool, a huge lake that Stanley had found on his first expedition. Chief Bouaboua-Njali received the expedition near the Gordon-Bennett River (Note: Gordon-Bennett River: Stanley named the river after James Gordon Bennett Jr., the editor of the New York Herald who had sponsored his explorations. Today it is the Djoué River.) (Djoué River). There they met Malamine, sent there by Pierre Savorgnan de Brazza, who showed them the treaty between Brazza and the chief Makoko that authorized France to establish posts on the north bank of the Pool. The explorers met various other chiefs in different locations near the Pool, and came close to an agreement to found a post at Ntamo in the territory of Chief Ngaliéma.

On 14 September 1881 the column set off again, but Stanley fell ill again. Captain Braconnier once again had to take command of the expedition. But, while the natives were hoisting the equipment in steep terrain, one of the wagons fell violently hitting Braconnier who was thrown into the rocks. He lost consciousness, but recovered and found he was covered with bruises, but without any fractures. However, he had to recover for a few weeks in a hut on the banks of the Congo River. Then, on 1 October, he joined Stanley on the left bank of the river, in the district of Kinsinde. He made a path on the Ijumbi plateau at the bottom of Ngoma hill, thanks to which the column could establish its camp at Usansi, in Makoko territory. On 3 December 1881 the boat En Avant was launched on the Pool and a few days later it arrived at Ntamo, where the foundations of Léopoldville (Kinshasa) were established.

== Foundation of Léopoldville ==
From the beginning of 1882, the foundation and construction of the Léopoldville station were entrusted to Captain Charles-Marie Braconnier. In order to protect himself from the local population and particularly from the chief Ngalièma, he first installed a blockhouse, around which other buildings were then erected. Gardens were established around the post. In Kinshasa, a square has been named Place Braconnier in honor of the founder and first commander of Léopoldville. It is on this square that the Embassy of the Kingdom of Belgium is currently located.

On 1 April 1883 Braconnier returned to Europe after three years of service and was succeeded by Louis Valcke. After his return to Belgium, on 18 January 1886 he gave a talk at the Société Royale Belge de Géographie (Royal Belgian Society of Geography) on "The Congo from a picturesque point of view". He also wrote for the bulletin of this venerable institution a study entitled "The Congo from the economic point of view".

After his exploration campaign in the Congo, Charles-Marie Braconnier continued his military career by climbing the ranks of the military hierarchy to eventually reach the highest rank of the Belgian army, becoming lieutenant-general by a royal decree of 26 September 1910.

Charles-Marie de Braconnier died during World War I on 13 March 1917 in Loosduinen, Netherlands.

== Honors and decorations ==
- Officer of the Order of Leopold, then Commander of the Order of Leopold
- Chevalier of the Royal Order of the Lion.
- Service Star
- Military Cross (Belgium) 1st class
- Grand Officer of the Cross of Military Merit of Spain.
- Commemorative Medal of the Reign of H.M. Léopold II.
- 1870–71 Commemorative Medal.

== Sources ==
- Altic, Mirela Slukan (2005), Henry Morton Stanley – Exploration and Mapping of the Congo River (1874-1877) (PDF), Zagreb/Croatia
- Coosemans, M. (1948), "BRACONNIER (Charles-Marie)" (PDF), Biographie Coloniale Belge (in French), vol. I, Inst. roy. colon. belge, pp. col.155–160
- La Chenaye-Desbois, Fr.-A. de (1773), Dictionnaire de la noblesse, vol. 6, Paris, p. 315
- Michel, M (1853), Biographie du Parlement de Metz, Metz, p. 292
- Saint-Allais, M. de (1815), Nobiliaire universel de France ou Recueil général des généalogies historiques des maisons nobles de ce Royaume (in French), vol. 5, Paris, p. 388
