= Leo Goemans =

A portrait of Leo Goemans by Felix Timmermans (1941)

Marie Antoine Léon Goemans (1869–1955) was a Belgian philologist, language educator and dialectologist.

== Life ==
Goemans was born in Leuven on 5 February 1869, and was educated in the city's atheneum. He then attended the Catholic University of Leuven, studying classical philology. He also took courses with the Orientalists Charles-Joseph de Harlez de Deulin and Philémon Colinet. Goemans graduated doctor of philology on 12 February 1890, aged 21, and was appointed as a teacher in Leuven atheneum the following year. He taught French and classical languages there until 1905, when he became an inspector of schools.

Goeans was a co-founder of the journals Revue des humanités de Belgique (established 1895) and Leuvensche Bijdragen (established 1896), and a member of the Maatschappij der Nederlandsche Letterkunde (1902), the Zuidnederlandse Maatschappij voor Taal- en Letterkunde en Geschiedenis (1904), and the Koninklijke Vlaamse Academie voor Taal- en Letterkunde (1911), of which he served as director in 1923. On 25 October 1926, he was appointed to the Commission royale de Toponymie et Dialectologie, which had been established that year. He died in Forest on 2 January 1955.

== Publications ==
His academic publications mostly concerned Flemish dialectology, in which he was one of the first to make use of sound-recording equipment in the field. He also published on the teaching of classical languages and classical literature, and contributed 54 entries to the Biographie Nationale de Belgique. His publications include:

- "Le néologisme savant dans la langue littéraire française", Revue belge, 5 (1892), pp. 105-107, 113-115
- "Het dialect van Leuven, eene phonetisch-historische studie", Leuvensche Bijdragen, 2, pp. 1-76, 104-186, 219-324.
- Leuvensch Taaleigen: Woordenboek, A-F (1936)
- Leuvensch Taaleigen: Woordenboek, G-Z (1954), with the assistance of Louis De Man
