= 1847 Belgian general election =

← 1845	8 June 1847	1848 →

54 of the 108 seats in the Chamber of Representatives 55 seats needed for a majority
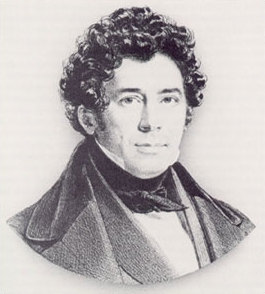

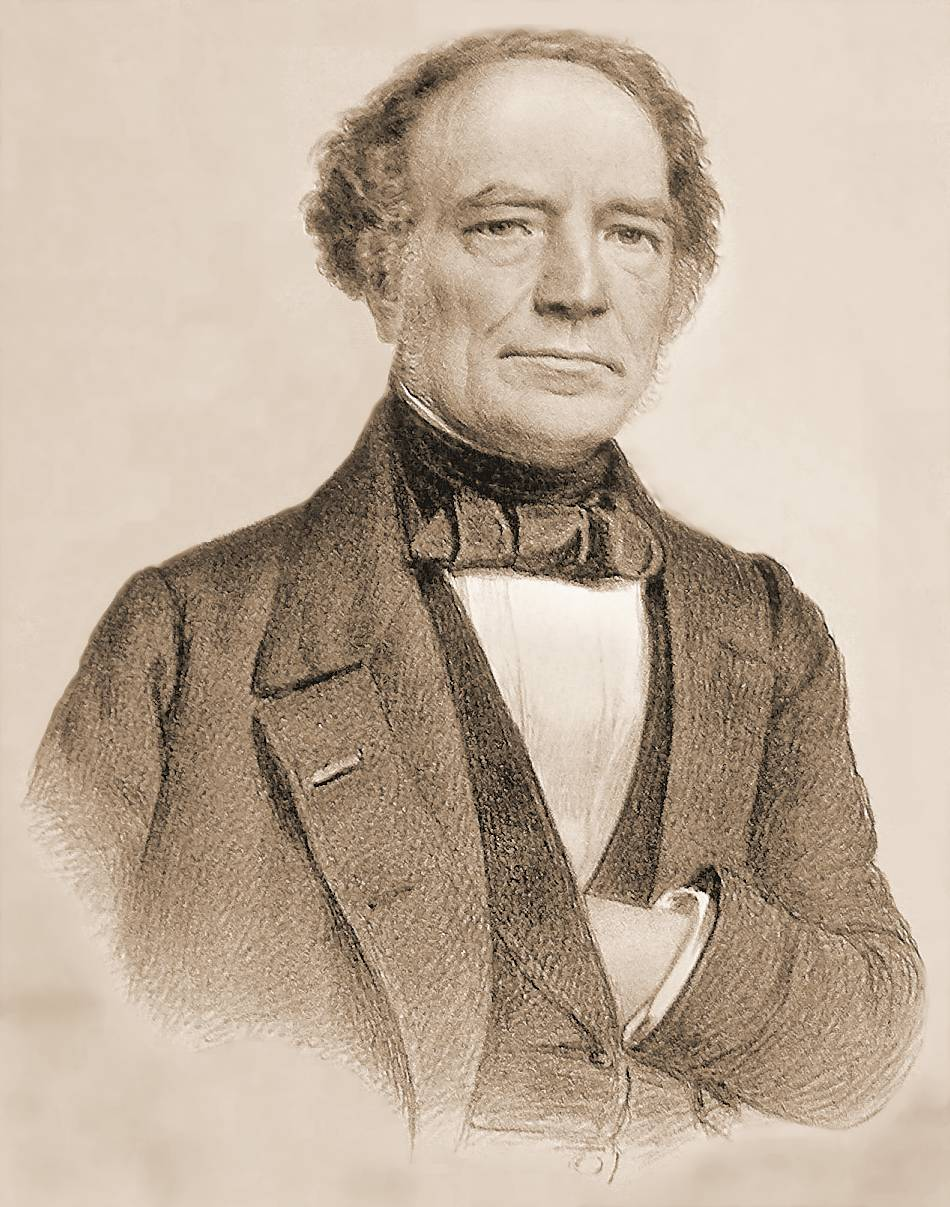
	First party	Second party
Leader	Charles Rogier	Barthélémy de Theux de Meylandt
Party	Liberal	Catholic
Leader since	Candidate for PM	Candidate for PM
Seats won	33	21
Seats after	55	53
Popular vote	9,142	8,298
Percentage	52.12%	47.31%
Government before election
de Theux de Meylandt II
Catholic
Government after election
Rogier I
Liberal

Partial general elections were held in Belgium on 8 June 1847. The result was a victory for the new Liberal Association, which had been formed the previous year. It won 33 seats to the Catholics' 21, as the latter were split into dogmatic and liberal groups. Only 1% of the country's population was eligible to vote.

Under the alternating system, Chamber elections were only held in four out of the nine provinces: East Flanders, Hainaut, Liège and Limburg. Thus, 54 of the 108 Chamber seats were up for election. The total number of Chamber seats increased from 98 to 108 following a reapportionment due to population increases.

While the liberals gained a majority in the Chamber, the Catholics retained theirs in the Senate. Following the election, the Catholic government led by Barthélémy de Theux de Meylandt resigned. After a political crisis of two months, a liberal government was formed on 12 August 1847, headed by Charles Rogier. The liberals would go on to win the 1848 elections.

== Results ==
=== Chamber of Representatives ===
Party	Votes	%	Seats	
Party	Votes	%	Won	Total
Liberal Association	9,142	52.12	33	55
Catholics	8,298	47.31	21	53
Others	101	0.58	0	0
Total	17,541	100.00	54	108
Total votes	17,541	–		
Registered voters/turnout	22,572	77.71		
Source: Mackie & Rose

=== Senate ===
Party	Seats	+/–
Catholics	32	0
Liberal Association	20	+7
Independents	2	–1
Total	54	+7
Source: Sternberger et al.
