= Barthélémy de Theux de Meylandt =

Belgian Roman Catholic politician

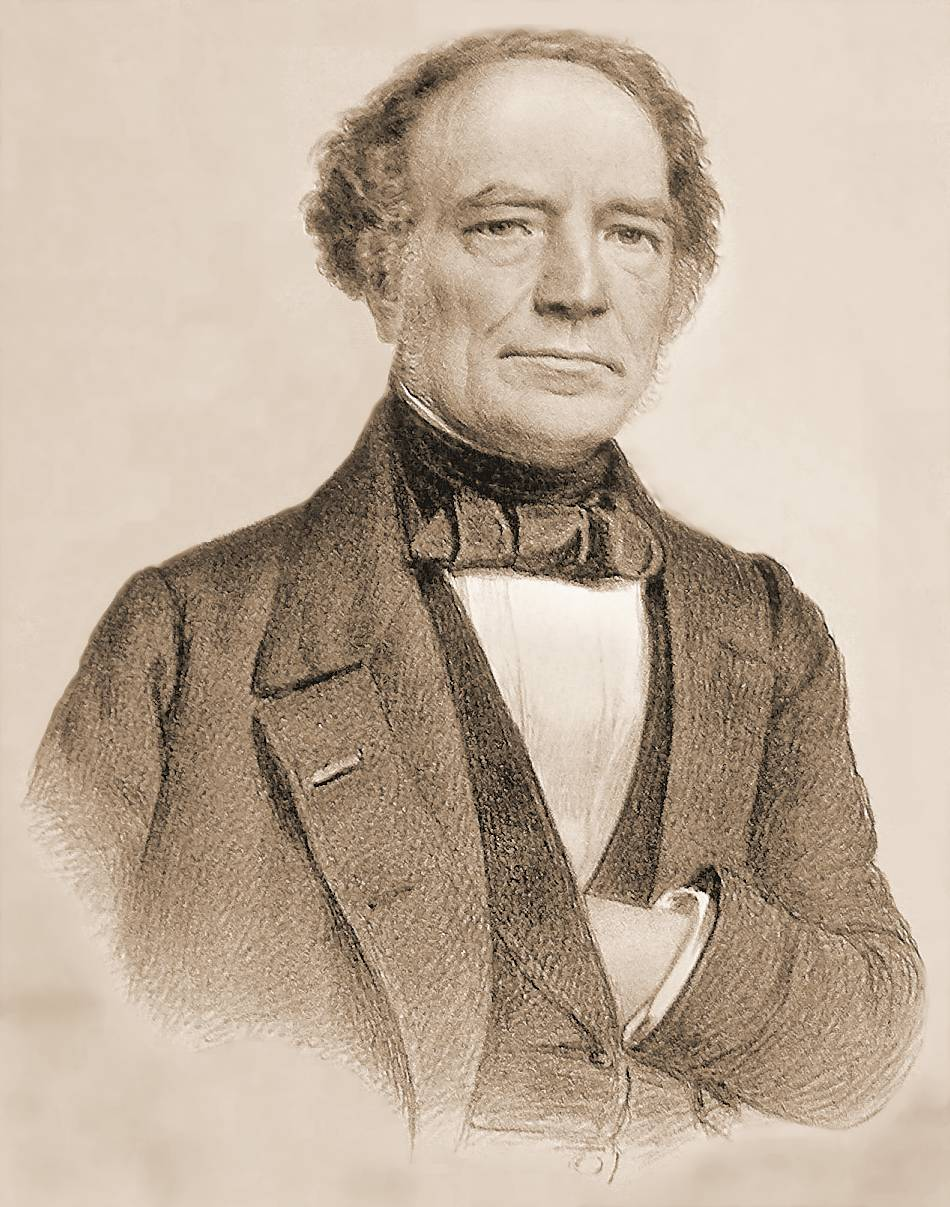
- de Meylandt, c. 1850

Prime Minister of Belgium
- In office 7 December 1871 – 21 August 1874
- Monarch: Leopold II
- Preceded by: Jules d'Anethan
- Succeeded by: Jules Malou
- In office 31 March 1846 – 12 August 1847
- Monarch: Leopold I
- Preceded by: Sylvain Van de Weyer
- Succeeded by: Charles Rogier
- In office 4 August 1834 – 18 April 1840
- Monarch: Leopold I
- Preceded by: Albert Joseph Goblet d'Alviella
- Succeeded by: Joseph Lebeau

Personal details
- Born: 26 February 1794 Sint-Truiden, Prince-Bishopric of Liège (now Belgium)
- Died: 21 August 1874 (aged 80) Heusden, Belgium
- Party: Catholic Party

Barthélemy Théodore, Count de Theux de Meylandt (26 February 1794 – 21 August 1874) was a Belgian Roman Catholic politician who served as the prime minister of Belgium three times. His family de Theux de Meylandt et Montjardin originated in Theux in 1341.

== Life ==
Barthélemy Théodore de Theux de Meylandt was born in the castle of Schabroek in Sint-Truiden on 26 February 1794. He was Minister of State (Belgium), a member of the National Congress, Belgium's Prime Minister (1834–1840, 1846–1847 and 1871–1874), Minister of Internal Affairs (1831–1832, 1834–1840 and 1846–1847) and Minister of Foreign Affairs (1836–1840).

The count died in Heusden, in the Meylandt Castle on 21 August 1874 in Belgium. He was the first Belgian Prime Minister to die in office.

== First government ==
The first government of Barthélémy de Theux de Meylandt was in office from 4 August 1834 to 18 April 1840. Members were:

Ministry	Officeholder	Party
Foreign Affairs	Felix de Muelenaere	Catholic
Internal Affairs	Barthélémy de Theux de Meylandt	Catholic
Justice	Antoine Ernst	Liberal
Finance	Edouard d'Huart	Liberal
Public Works	Jean-Baptiste Nothomb	Catholic
War	Lieutenant-general Louis Evain	Technician
Without portfolio	Félix de Mérode	Catholic

== Second government ==
The second government of Barthélémy de Theux de Meylandt was in office from 31 March 1846 to 12 August 1847. Members were:

Ministry	Officeholder	Party
Foreign Affairs	Adolphe Deschamps	Catholic
Internal Affairs	Barthélémy de Theux de Meylandt	Catholic
Justice	Jules d'Anethan	Catholic
Finance	Jules Malou	Catholic
Public Works	Georges de Bavay	Catholic
War	Albert Prisse	Catholic
Without portfolio	Felix de Muelenaere	Catholic
Without portfolio	Edouard d'Huart	Liberal, Catholic

== Third government ==
The third government of Barthélémy de Theux de Meylandt was in office from 7 December 1871 to 11 June 1878. When Barthélémy de Theux de Meylandt died on 21 August 1874 he was succeeded by Jules Malou, Minister of Finance. Members were:

Ministry	Officeholder	Party
Foreign Affairs	Guillaume d'Aspremont Lynden	Catholic
Internal Affairs	Charles Delcour	Catholic
Justice	Théophile de Lantsheere	Catholic
Finance	Jules Malou	Catholic
Public Works	François Moncheur	Catholic
War	Henri Guillaume	Technical
Without Portfolio	Barthélémy de Theux de Meylandt	Catholic

== Honours ==
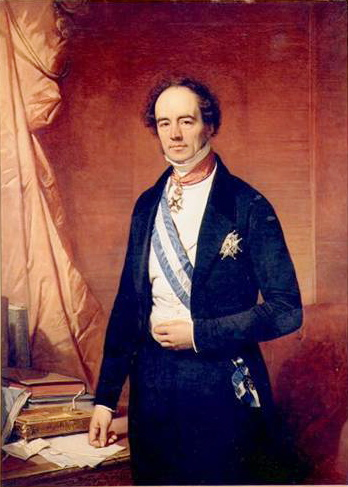
Portrait with the Grand Cross of Order of Charles III.

National honours

- Belgium :
  - Minister of State, by Royal Decree.
  - Grand Cordon of the Order of Leopold.
  - Croix de Fer.

Foreign Honours

- France : Officer in the Legion of Honour.
- Kingdom of Italy : Knight Grand Cross in the Order of Saints Maurice and Lazarus.
- Spain : Knight Grand Cross in the Order of Charles III.
- Holy See : Knight Grand Cross in the Pontifical Order of Saint Gregory the Great.
- Kingdom of Portugal : Knight Grand Cross in the Military Order of Christ.
- Tunisia: Grand Cross with Brilliants in the (de jure Ottoman Tunisian) Order of Nicham-el-Oftikhar.

== Political offices ==
Political offices
Preceded by Albert Joseph Goblet d'Alviella	Prime Minister of Belgium; 1834–1840	Succeeded by Joseph Lebeau
Preceded by Sylvain Van de Weyer	Prime Minister of Belgium; 1846–1847	Succeeded by Charles Rogier
Preceded by Jules d'Anethan	Prime Minister of Belgium; 1871–1874	Succeeded by Jules Malou
