= Jules d'Anethan =

Belgian politician

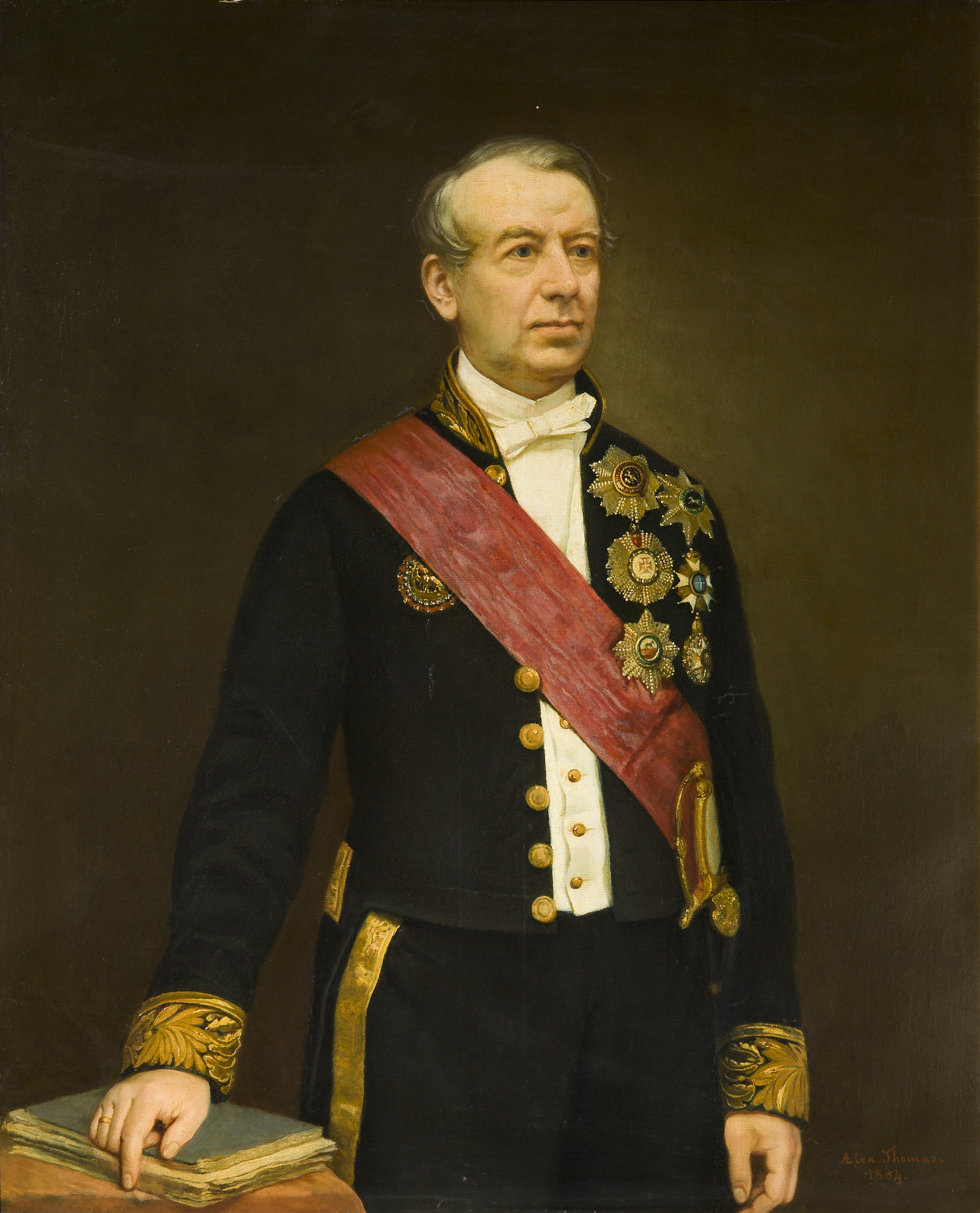

Prime Minister of Belgium
- In office 2 July 1870 – 7 December 1871
- Monarch: Leopold II
- Preceded by: Walthère Frère-Orban
- Succeeded by: Barthélémy de Theux de Meylandt

President of the Senate
- In office 23 July 1884 – 10 November 1885
- Preceded by: Edmond de Sélys Longchamps
- Succeeded by: Charles de Merode-Westerloo

Personal details
- Born: 23 April 1803; Brussels, France (now Belgium)
- Died: 8 October 1888 (aged 85); Schaerbeek, Belgium
- Political party: Catholic Party

Jules Joseph, Baron d'Anethan (French pronunciation: [ʒyl ʒozɛf baʁɔ̃ dantɑ̃]; 23 April 1803 – 8 October 1888) was a Belgian Catholic Party politician.

After serving as minister for Justice and Religion, D'Anethan was named the prime minister of Belgium and minister of Foreign Affairs by King Leopold II on 2 July 1870. During his term in office, d'Anethan was responsible for directing the Belgian reaction to the Franco-Prussian War.

D'Anethan and the king agreed a programme whereby the King's favoured military reforms—in particular the abolition of Remplacement conscription—would be implemented, along with an agreement not to institute electoral reforms. He served as Foreign and War minister in his own government.

D'Anethan was obliged to include in his cabinet ministers who were opposed to the abolition of Remplacement which led to conflicts with the King. A political crisis following his nomination of Pierre de Decker as governor of Limburg led to the resignation of d'Anethan's government.

He later served, from 1884 to 1885, as president of the Belgian Senate.

== Honours ==
- Belgium: Minister of State, by royal decree
- Belgium: Grand Cordon in the Order of Leopold
- Kingdom of Portugal: Knight Grand Cross in the Order of Christ.
- Empire of Brazil: Knight Grand Cross in the Imperial Order of the Rose.
- Kingdom of Hanover: Knight Grand Cross in the Royal Guelphic Order
- Siam: Grand Officer in the Most Exalted Royal Order of the White Elephant

== Sources ==
- L. Plettinck, Biographie du baron J. J. d'Anethan, Brugge, 1899
- A. Cosemans, Jules Joseph d'Anethan, in: Biographie nationale de Belgique, T. XXIX, 1956, col. 93–96.
- Cooper, Thompson (1884). "Anéthan, Jules Joseph, Baron d'" . Men of the Time (eleventh ed.). London: George Routledge & Sons. p. 43.

Political offices
Preceded by Walthère Frère-Orban	Prime Minister of Belgium; 1870–1871	Succeeded by Barthélémy de Theux de Meylandt
Preceded by Edmond de Sélys Longchamps	President of the Senate; 1884–1885	Succeeded by Charles de Merode-Westerloo
