= Walthère Frère-Orban =

Belgian politician (1812–1896)

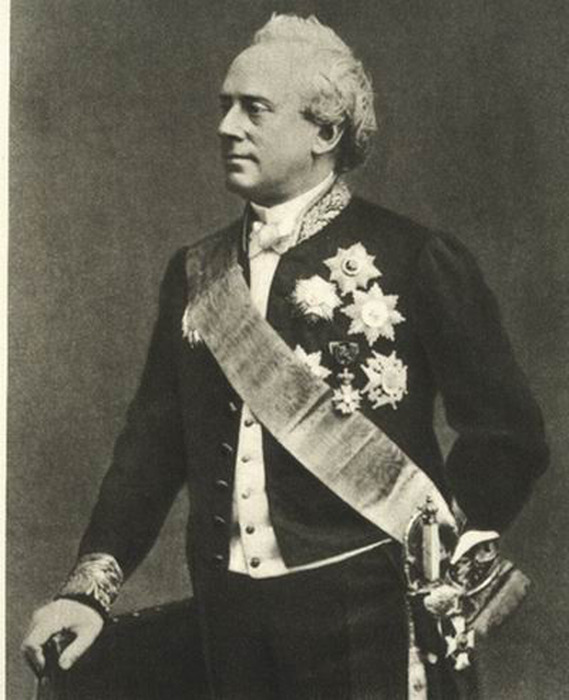

Prime Minister of Belgium
- In office 19 June 1878 – 16 June 1884
- Monarch: Leopold II
- Preceded by: Jules Malou
- Succeeded by: Jules Malou
- In office 3 January 1868 – 2 July 1870
- Monarch: Leopold II
- Preceded by: Charles Rogier
- Succeeded by: Jules d'Anethan

Personal details
- Born: 24 April 1812 Liège, France (now Belgium)
- Died: 2 January 1896 (aged 83) Brussels, Belgium
- Party: Liberal Party

Hubert Joseph Walthère Frère-Orban (French pronunciation: [ybɛʁ ʒozɛf waltɛʁ fʁɛʁ ɔʁbɑ̃]; 24 April 1812 – 2 January 1896) was a Belgian liberal statesman who served as the Prime Minister of Belgium from 1868 to 1870 and again from 1878 to 1884.

== Early life ==
He was born at Liège, received his education at home and in Paris, and began the practice of law in his native town. He identified himself with the Liberal party, and was conspicuous in the controversy with the Catholic clergy.

== Career ==
In 1846, he wrote the program, which was accepted as the charter for a liberal political party. In 1847 he was elected to the Belgian Chamber and appointed Minister of Public Works. and from 1848 to 1852 he held the portfolio of Finance. He reduced postage, abolished the newspaper tax and was a strong advocate of free trade.

His work, La mainmorte et la charité (1854–57), directed against the Conservatives, produced a great effect on the position of parties in Belgium. As a result, in 1857, the Liberals returned to power and Frère-Orban became once more minister of Finance in the cabinet of Charles Rogier, whom he succeeded to become the prime minister in 1868. In 1870 the Catholics regained their supremacy and forced him to retire, but from 1878 to 1884 he was again at the head of the cabinet, most notably breaking off diplomatic relations with the Papal States in 1880 (which were restored in 1884).

As finance minister, Frère-Orban was instrumental in the creation of Belgium's three major public financial institutions, namely the National Bank of Belgium in 1850, the Caisse Générale d'Épargne et de Retraite in 1850-1865, and the Crédit Communal de Belgique in 1860.

Standing as a liberal again in the October 1894 elections, he categorically refused the support of Catholics against progressives and socialists. He was not re-elected, defeated by the socialist Célestin Demblon.

Weakened by illness, he died on 2 January 1896. Frère-Orban lies in its birthplace, Liège, in the cemetery of Robermont.

== Political philosophy ==
Frère-Orban's liberalism consisted in the assertion of the authority of the state over the church and the defense of the system of secular public instruction against the clergy. He was at all times opposed to the "undue extension" of suffrage. Among other works he wrote La question monétaire.

== Honours ==
National

- Belgium:
  - Minister of State, by Royal Decree.
  - 1881: Grand Cordon in the Order of Leopold (civil division).

Foreign

- (Austrian Empire) (Kingdom of Hungary) Austria-Hungary: 1881: Knight Grand Cross in the Royal Hungarian Order of Saint Stephen.
- Kingdom of France: Knight Grand Cross in the Legion of Honour.
- Kingdom of Prussia: 6 May 1852: Knight 1st Class in the Order of the Red Eagle.
- Austrian Empire: Knight Grand Cross in the Imperial Order of Leopold of Austria
- Kingdom of Spain: Knight Grand Cross in the Order of Charles III.
- Kingdom of Portugal: Knight Grand Cross in the Royal Military Order of Our Lord Jesus Christ.
- Kingdom of Hanover: Knight Grand Cross in the Royal Guelphic Order.
- Kingdom of Italy: Knight Grand Cross in the Order of Saints Maurice and Lazarus.
- Kingdom of the Netherlands: Knight Grand Cross in the Order of the Gold Lion of the House of Nassau.

== See also ==
- ASLK / CGER

== Sources ==
- Liberal Archive

Political offices
Preceded by Charles Rogier	Prime Minister of Belgium; 1868–1870	Succeeded by Jules d'Anethan
Preceded by Jules Malou	Prime Minister of Belgium; 1878–1884	Succeeded by Jules Malou
