= 1861 in Belgium =

- Decades: 1840s; 1850s; 1860s; 1870s; 1880s
- See also: Other events of 1861; List of years in Belgium

Events in the year 1861 in Belgium.

== Incumbents ==
Monarchy of Belgium: Leopold I
Head of government: Charles Rogier

== Events ==
January

- 1 January – Franco-Belgian Tirailleurs renamed Papal Zouaves.

February

- 7 February – François Robyn (Br Hugo in religion) sentenced to death at the Court of assizes in Mons for arson at Scourmont Priory the previous October.

May

- 1 May – Commercial treaty with France modelled on the Anglo-French commercial treaty of 1860.
- 19 May – Association "Vlamingen Vooruit!" organises mass meeting in Brussels
- 27 May – Commercial treaty with France ratified.

June

- 1 June – Commercial treaty with France comes into effect.
- 11 June – Partial legislative elections of 1861

July

- 20 July – Signing of Treaty of Amity, Commerce and Navigation between Belgium and Mexico negotiated by Auguste t'Kint.

October

- 1 October – Commercial treaty between Britain, France and Belgium comes into effect.
- 10 October – Commercial treaty with the Ottoman Empire signed at Constantinople by Gaston Errembault de Dudzeele for Belgium and by Esad Safvet and Mohammed Djemil for the Sublime Porte.

== Art and architecture ==
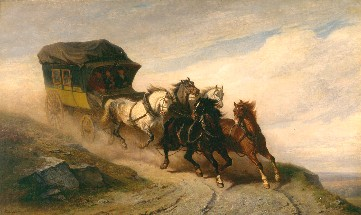
Charles-Philogène Tschaggeny, The Ardennes Mail Coach (Royal Museums of Fine Arts of Belgium, Inv. 1559)

=== Paintings ===
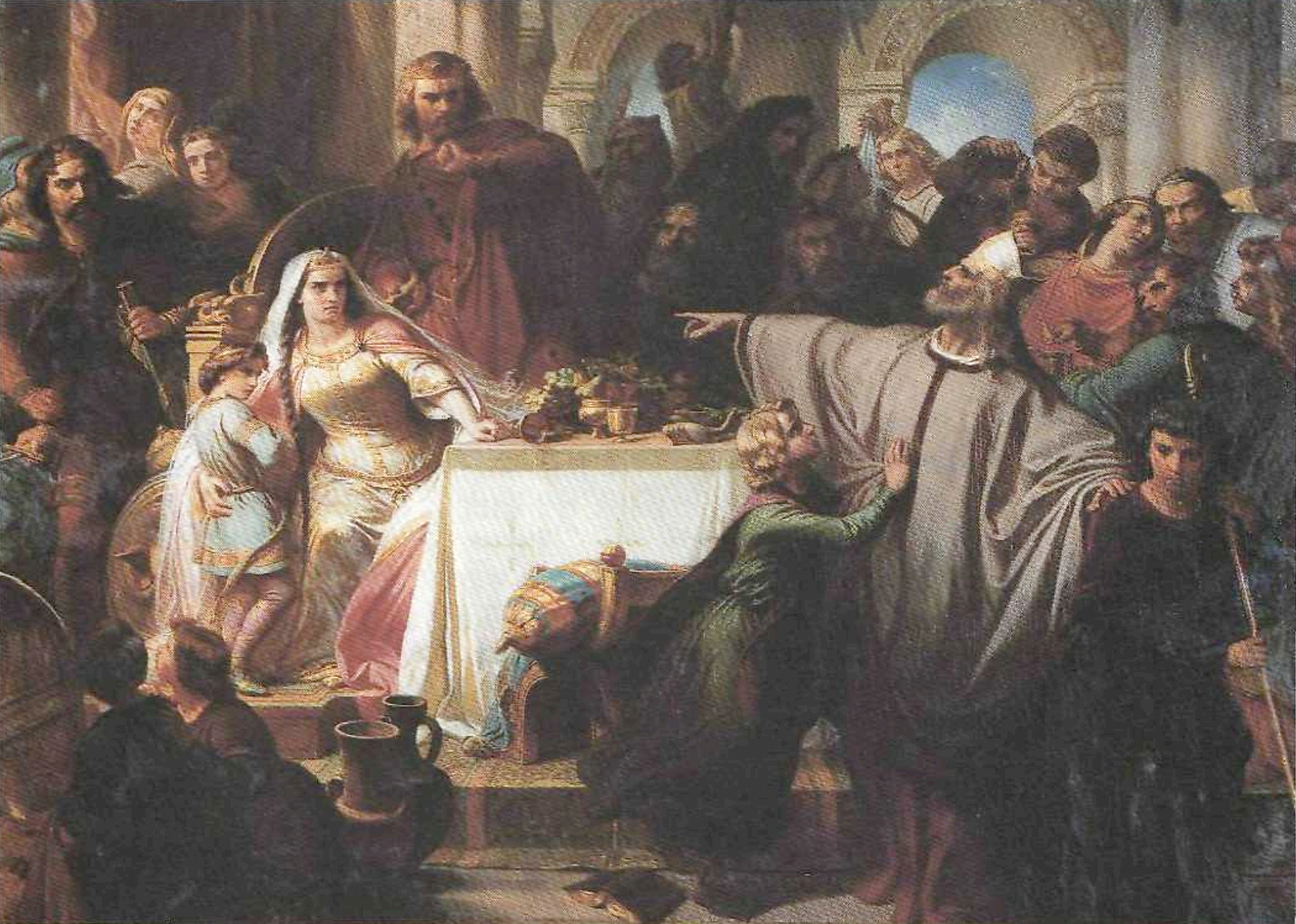
Auguste Chauvin, The Banquet of Jupille

- Auguste Chauvin, The Banquet of Jupille
- Charles-Philogène Tschaggeny, The Ardennes Mail Coach.

== Publications ==
Periodicals

- Annuaire de l'Académie Royale des Sciences, des Lettres et des Beaux-Arts de Belgique, 27
- La Belgique Horticole, vol. 11.
- Bulletin de la Fédération des Sociétés d'Horticulture
- Bulletin Usuel des Lois et Arrêtés, 1539–1813 (Brussels)
- Collection de précis historiques, vol. 10, edited by Edouard Terwecoren S.J.
- La Tribune du peuple (Brussels) begins publication
- Revue belge et étrangère, 12
- Het Vlaemsch Verbond begins publication

Reports and pamphlets

- Bulletin administratif du Ministère de l'Intérieur, series 1 (1830–1847), vol. 1 (1830-1831).
- Recueil des lois et arrêtés royaux de Belgique, vol. 48 (Brussels, Imprimerie du Moniteur Belge)
- Charles Le Hardy de Beaulieu, L'Espagne et son avenir commercial: Des relations à créer entre la Belgique et l'Espagne (Brussels: A. Lacroix, Verboeckhoven et Cie.)

Literary and historical writing

- Adolphe Borgnet, Histoire des Belges à la fin du XVIIIe siècle
- Charles De Coster, Contes brabançons
- Gustave Oppelt, Histoire générale et chronologique de la Belgique, de 1830 à 1860 (Brussels, M. Hayez)
- Auguste Scheler, Trente années de la littérature belge (Brussels: Aug. Schnée)
- J.L.D. Sleeckx, Beschryving der Provincie Braband (Ghent: I.S. Van Doosselaere)
- William Henry James Weale, Notes sur Jean van Eyck (Brussels: A. Lacroix, Verboeckhoven et Cie; London: Barthes & Lowell)

Music

- Barthélemy-Antoine Bauwens, Le plain-chant mis à la portée de tout le monde (Paris and Brussels: Casterman)
- Henri Vieuxtemps, Violin Concerto No. 5

== Births ==
- Elisabeth Wesmael, graphic artist (died 1953)
- 6 January – Victor Horta, architect (died 1947)
- 11 March – Francis Dhanis, colonial administrator (died 1909)
- 2 April – Ernest van Dyck, singer (died 1923)
- 20 April – Arthur Van Gehuchten, anatomist (died 1914)
- 5 July – Fernand Cocq, politician (died 1940)
- 12 July – Eugène Broerman, painter (died 1932)
- 13 August – Fernand Brouez, magazine publisher (died 1900)
- 16 August – Diana Coomans, painter (died 1952)
- 27 August – Aloïs de Beule, sculptor (died 1935)
- 1 September – Louis Bernheim, general (died 1931)
- 3 September – Ursmer Berlière, historian (died 1932)
- 9 October – Privat Livemont, artist (died 1936)
- 21 October – Charles van Lerberghe, poet (died 1907)
- 3 November – Louis Ruquoy, soldier (died 1937)
- 6 November – Germain Morin, patrologist (died 1946)
- 10 December – Guillaume Van Strydonck, painter (died 1937)

== Deaths ==
- 5 April – Ferdinand de Meeûs (born 1798), politician
- 8 April – Édouard Wacken (born 1819), poet and dramatist
- 24 September – Michael Joseph François Scheidweiler (born 1799), horticulturalist
- 27 October – Marcellin Jobard (born 1792), photographer
- 3 December – Henry Voordecker (born 1779), painter
- 25 December – Jacobus Josephus Eeckhout (born 1793), painter
