= 1865 in Belgium =

- Decades: 1840s; 1850s; 1860s; 1870s; 1880s
- See also: Other events of 1865; List of years in Belgium

Events in the year 1865 in Belgium.

== Incumbents ==
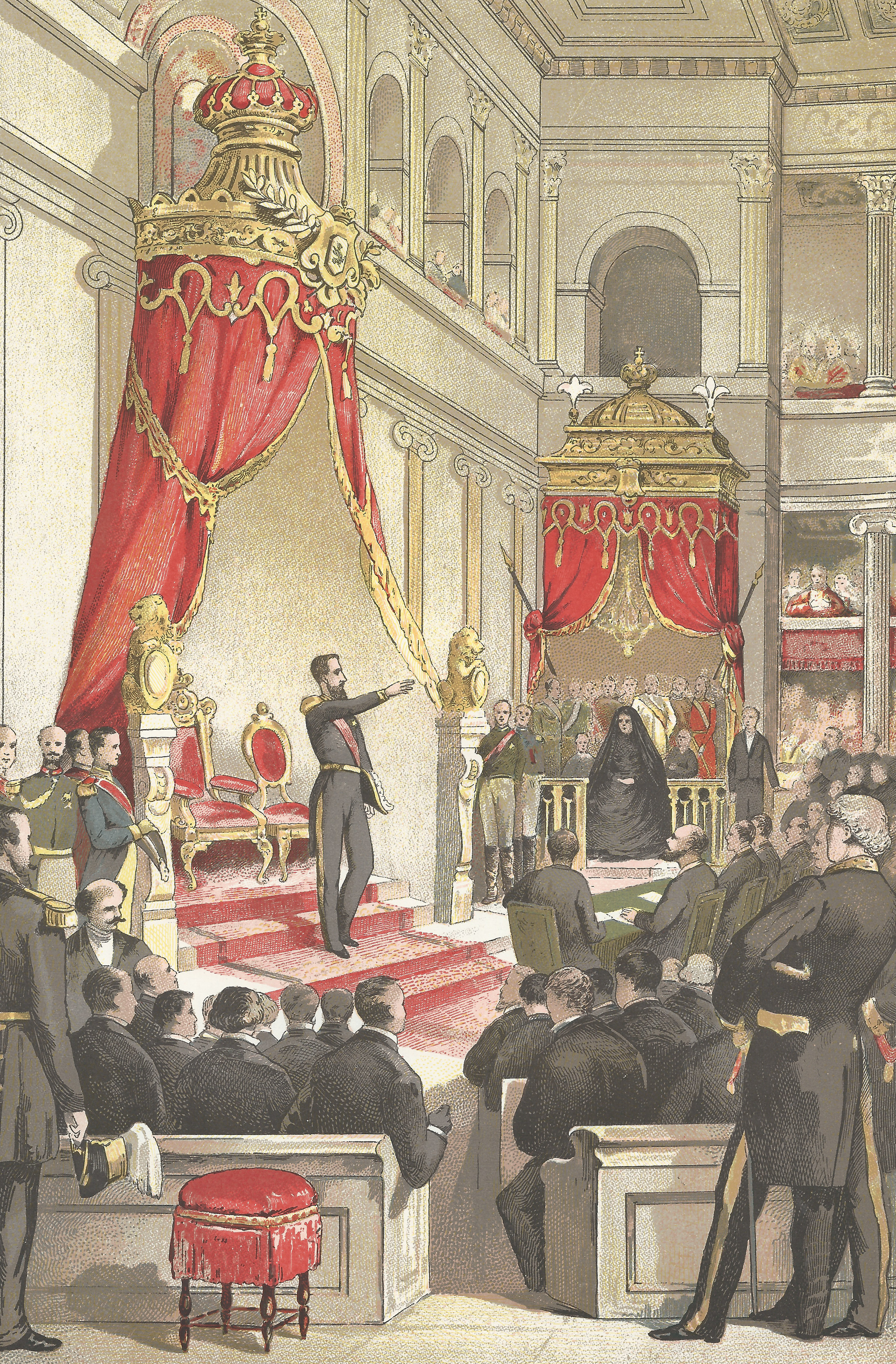
Leopold II swears to uphold the constitution, 17 December 1865

Monarch: Leopold I (until 10 December); Leopold II (from in 17 December)
Head of government: Charles Rogier

== Events ==
March

- 16 March – Belgian state guarantees private savings.

April

- 4 April – Opposition parties accuse government of breaching Belgian neutrality by involving the country in the Second French intervention in Mexico.

May

- 1 May – Henricus Franciscus Bracq consecrated as bishop of Ghent
- 22 May — Commercial treaty with the German Customs Union signed in Berlin.
- 26 May – 1863–75 cholera pandemic caused 45,000 fatalities in Belgium in 1865.

July

- 16 July – Belgian Legion wins Battle of la Loma in Mexico.

August

- 21 August — Law on tariffs and customs reform published.

September

- 23 September – Brussels city council approves plans for the covering of the Senne.

October

- 2 October – Sint-Lievenscollege founded in Ghent

November

- 2 November – Treaty of Amity, Commerce and Navigation between China and Belgium, negotiated by Auguste t'Kint, signed in Beijing.
- 14 November – Jules Bara succeeds Victor Tesch as Minister of Justice.

December

- 10 December – Death of King Leopold I of Belgium.
- 16 December – Leopold I of Belgium buried in Laken, despite his wish to be buried in Windsor; Auguste t'Kint arrives in Yokohama as the first Belgian diplomat in Japan.
- 17 December – Leopold II of Belgium sworn in as King.
- 23 December — Convention between France, Belgium, Italy and Switzerland forming the Latin Monetary Union signed in Paris.

== Publications ==
Periodicals

- Almanach royal officiel (Brussels, H. Tarlier and Rozez)
- Analectes pour servir à l'histoire ecclésiastique de la Belgique, vol. 2, edited by P. F. X. de Ram.
- Annales de la Société d'émulation pour l'étude de l'histoire et des antiquités de la Flandre, 2nd series, vol. 13 (Bruges, Vandecasteele-Werbrouck)
- Annuaire de l'Université catholique de Louvain, vol. 29 (Leuven, Vanlinthout)
- Collection de précis historiques, vol. 14, edited by Edouard Terwecoren S.J.
- La Liberté begins publication (March).
- Revue Générale begins publication (January).
- Rond den Heerd begins publication (December).

Scholarship

- Émile de Borchgrave, Histoire des colonies belges, qui s'établirent en Allemagne pendant le XIIe et le XIIIe siècle (Brussels)
- Joseph Jean De Smet (ed.), Recueil des chroniques de Flandre, vol. 4 (Brussels, Commission royale d'Histoire)
- Joseph Jean De Smet, Mémoire historique sur la guerre de Maximilien, roi des Romains, contre les villes de Flandre (1482-1488) (Brussels, Hayez for Royal Academy of Science, Letters and Fine Arts of Belgium) – a study of the Flemish revolts against Maximilian of Austria.
- Paul Henrard, Histoire de l'artillerie en Belgique depuis son origine jusqu'au règne d'Albert et d'Isabelle (Brussels, C. Muquardt)
- Alphonse O'Kelly de Galway, Dictionnaire des cris d'armes et devises des personnages célèbres et des familles nobles et autres de la Belgique ancienne et moderne (Brussels, A. Schnée)

Literature

- Hendrik Conscience, De Burgemeester van Luik
- Clémentine Louant, Les Fleurettes

== Art and architecture ==
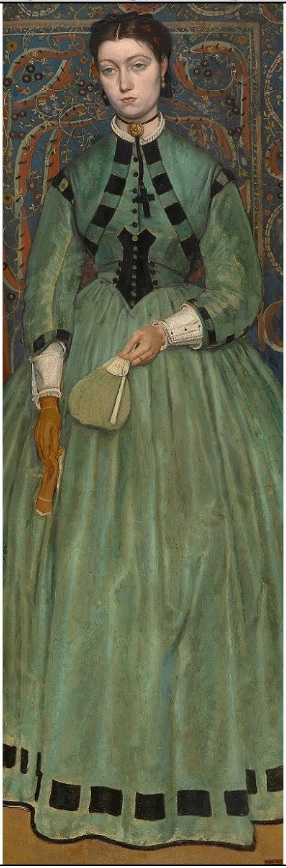
Henri Leys, Portrait of Lucie Leys, his daughter (1865)

Buildings

- Arlon Synagogue completed.

Paintings

- Henri Leys, Lucie Leys

== Science ==
- Louis Melsens receives Montyon Prize for his work on the use of potassium iodide to treat mercury poisoning and lead poisoning.

== Balance of trade ==
In 1865 imports to Belgium were valued at 1.364 million francs, with exports of 1.204 million francs.

== Births ==
- Date uncertain – Joseph Middeleer, painter (died 1939)
- 19 January – Égide Rombaux, sculptor (died 1942)
- 27 January – Ferdinand Feyerick, fencer (died 1920)
- 30 January – Marie de Bièvre, painter (died 1909)
- 25 February – Flavie Van den Hende, cellist (died 1925)
- 2 March – Théo Ysaÿe, composer (died 1918)
- 7 March – Jean Massart, botanist (died 1925)
- 2 April – Louise Danse, painter (died 1948)
- 4 April – Clément Van Bogaert, engineer (died 1937)
- 1 May – Frans Mortelmans, painter (died 1936)
- 4 May – Servais Le Roy, entertainer (died 1953)
- 9 May – August de Boeck, composer (died 1937)
- 21 May – Evert Larock, painter (died 1901)
- 6 June – Antoon Jozef Witteryck, publisher (died 1934)
- 15 June – Paul Gilson, composer (died 1942)
- 14 July – Marguerite Verboeckhoven, painter (died 1949)
- 23 July – Frans Alfons Janssens, priest-scientist (died 1924)
- 11 December – Édouard Poncelet, archivist (died 1947)

== Deaths ==
- 3 January – Joseph Lies, painter (born 1821)
- 5 January – Pierre Kersten, publisher (born 1789)
- 14 January – Marie-Anne Libert, botanist (born 1782)
- 19 March – Joseph Lebeau, politician (born 1794)
- 26 April – Charles-Joseph Sax, musical instrument maker (born 1790)
- 14 May – Pierre François Xavier de Ram, historian (born 1804)
- 18 June – Antoine Wiertz, painter (born 1806)
- 12 July – Constant de Kerchove de Denterghem, politician (born 1790)
- 15 August – Nicolas-Joseph Dehesselle, bishop (born 1789)
