= 1862 in Belgium =

- Decades: 1840s; 1850s; 1860s; 1870s; 1880s
- See also: Other events of 1862; List of years in Belgium

Events in the year 1862 in Belgium.

== Incumbents ==
Monarch: Leopold I
Head of government: Charles Rogier

== Events ==
- Chimay Brewery founded
- Belgian Catholic Mission to China established

March

- 3 March – Leopold I of Belgium writes a letter to the dean of Windsor expressing a desire to be buried alongside his first wife, Princess Charlotte of Wales.
- 29 March – Two members of a criminal gang guillotined in Charleroi.

April

- 11 April – Belgian Navy abolished.

May

- 26 May – Provincial elections

July

- 23 July – Anglo-Belgian Treaty of Commerce and Navigation signed.

September

- 16 September – Victor Hugo's Brussels publisher, Albert Lacroix, holds a banquet to celebrate the success of Les Misérables

== Art and architecture ==
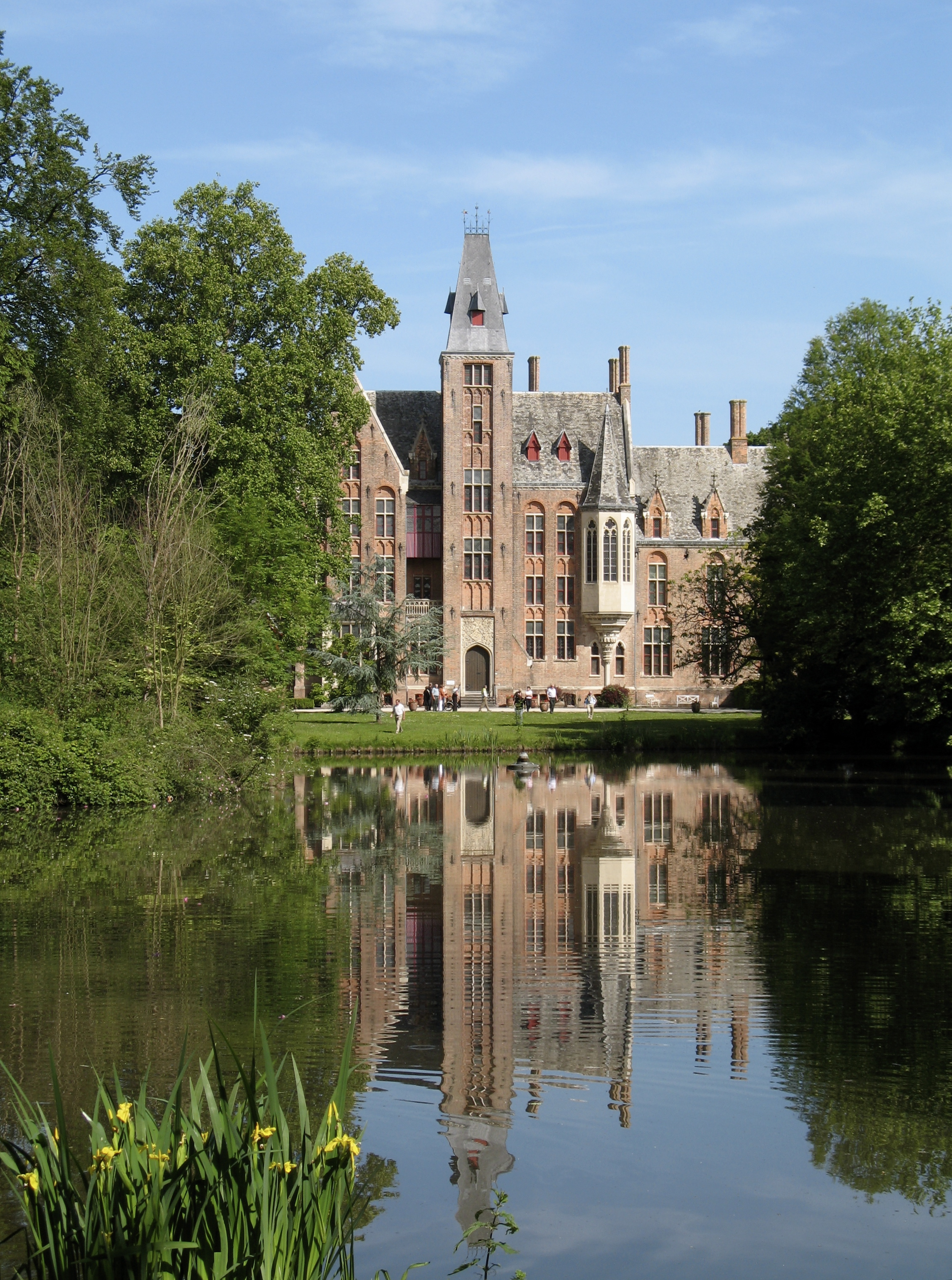
Loppem Castle

Buildings

- Loppem Castle (designed by E. W. Pugin and Jean-Baptiste Bethune) completed

Paintings

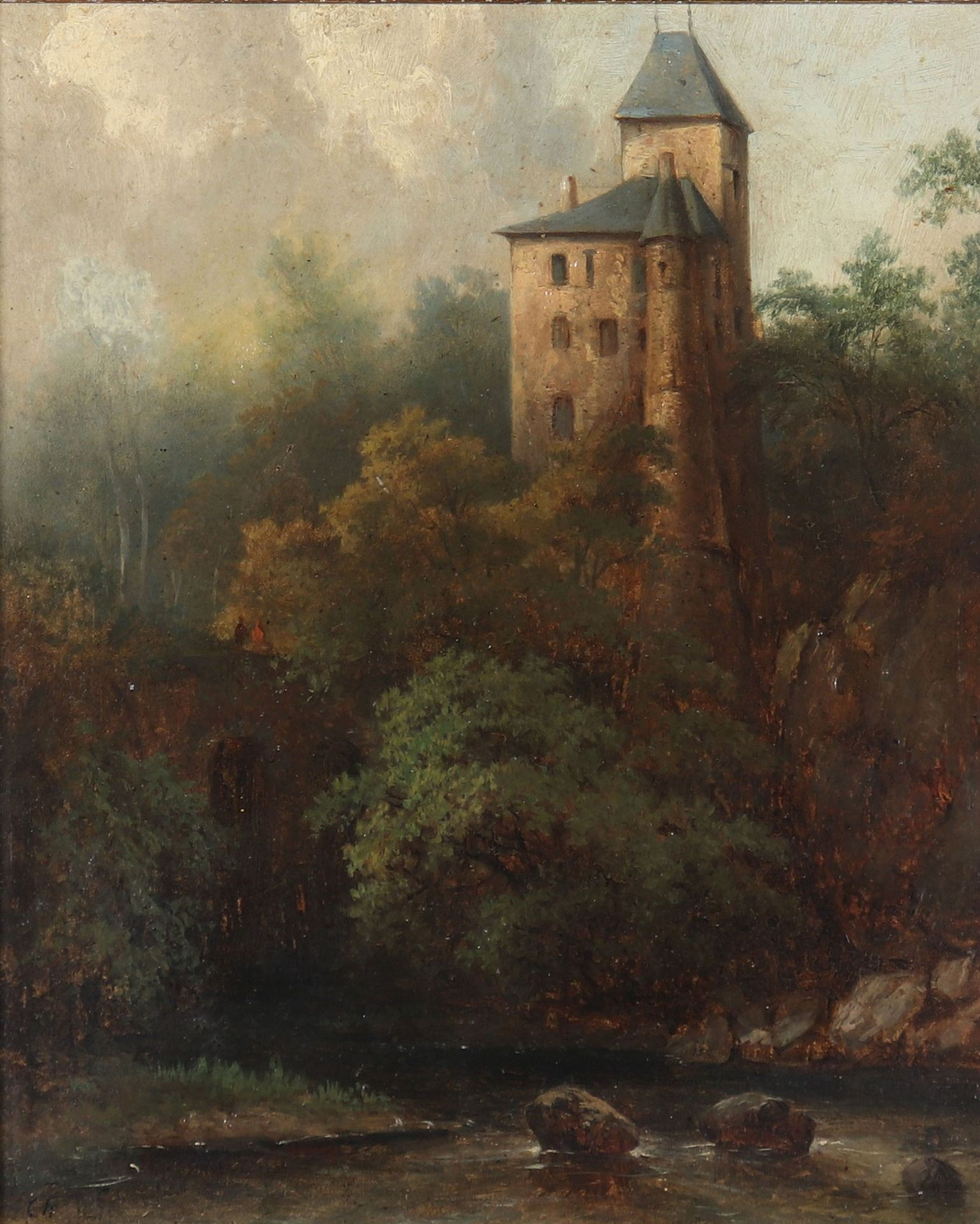
Charles Soubre, View of the Castle in Remouchamps (1862)

- Charles Soubre, View of the Castle in Remouchamps

== Publications ==
Periodicals and series

- Almanach royal officiel (Brussels, H. Tarlier)
- La Belgique Horticole, vol. 12.
- Collection de précis historiques, vol. 11, edited by Edouard Terwecoren S.J.
- L'Education de la Femme begins publication
- Recueil des lois et arrêtés royaux de Belgique, vol. 49 (Brussels, Imprimerie du Moniteur Belge)
- Revue belge et étrangère, vol. 13.
- De Vlaemsche school: tijdschrift voor kunsten, letteren, wetenschappen, ouheidskunde en kunstnyverheid, vol. 8.

Monographs and reports

- Robert Scott Burn, Notes of an Agricultural Tour in Belgium, Holland, & the Rhine (London, Longman, Green, Longman, Roberts & Green)
- Louis Galesloot, Procès de François Anneessens, doyen du corps des métiers de Bruxelles, vol. 1 (Brussels and The Hague)

Literature and the arts

- Maria Doolaeghe, Sinte Godelieve, Vlaemsche legende uit de XIde eeuw
- Guido Gezelle, Gedichten, Gezangen en Gebeden
- Victor Hugo, Les Misérables, published in Brussels, then in Paris and Leipzig by A. Lacroix, Verboeckhoven & Cie.
- William Henry James Weale, Restauration des monuments publics en Belgique, second edition

== Births ==
- 22 May — Joseph Amerlinck, engineer (died 1915)
- 19 June – Paul Saintenoy, architect (died 1952)
- 29 August – Maurice Maeterlinck, author (died 1949)
- 10 December – Georges Hulin de Loo, art historian (died 1945)

== Deaths ==
- 29 January – Louis-Joseph Seutin (born 1793), surgeon and senator
- 10 March – Pieter van Hanselaere (born 1786), painter
- 5 August – Felix de Muelenaere (born 1793), Catholic politician
- 8 December – Pierre-Théodore Verhaegen (born 1796), liberal politician
