= 1860 in Belgium =

- Decades: 1840s; 1850s; 1860s; 1870s; 1880s
- See also: Other events of 1860; List of years in Belgium

Events in the year 1860 in Belgium.

== Incumbents ==
Monarchy of Belgium: Leopold I
Head of government: Charles Rogier

== Events ==
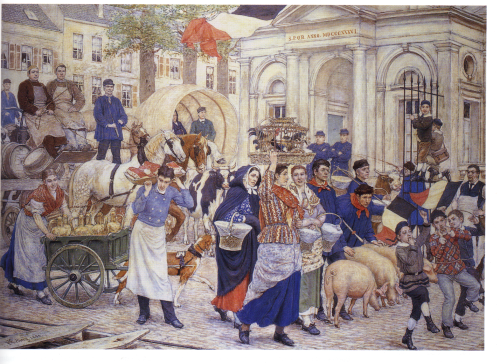
Xavier Mellery, The Abolition of the Tolls in 1860 (1890)

- 28 May – Provincial elections
- 9 July – Belgian consulate in Damascus destroyed during anti-Christian pogroms.
- 18 July – Duties charged on goods brought from the countryside into towns abolished.
- 7 October – One of the monks sets fire to the church and one of the dormitories at Scourmont Priory.
- 16 November – Execution of Jan Coucke and Pieter Goethals.

== Publications ==
Periodicals

- Annales de pomologie belge et étrangère, vol. 8.
- Annuaire de l'Académie Royale des Sciences, des Lettres et des Beaux-Arts de Belgique, 26.
- Annuaire militaire officiel, 14.
- La Belgique Horticole, 10.
- La Belgique
- Bulletin du bibliophile belge, 16
- Collection de précis historiques, 9, edited by Edouard Terwecoren

Monographs and reports

- La Belgique en 1860 (Brussels, Philippe Hen).
- Manifestation nationale du peuple belge en 1860 (Brussels, E. Guyot, and Haarlem, J. J. Weeveringh).
- Recueil des pièces imprimées par ordre de la Chambre des Représentants, vol. 1.
- Louis Hymans, Histoire populaire de la Belgique (Brussels and Leipzig, Auguste Schnée)
- F. Prové, De la question monétaire en Belgique (Brussels, J.-B. Tarride).

Guidebooks

- A Handbook for Travellers on the Continent: Being a Guide to Holland, Belgium, Prussia, Northern Germany, and the Rhine from Holland to Switzerland (London, John Murray).

Literature

- Joseph Octave Delepierre, A Sketch of the History of Flemish Literature and its Celebrated Authors from the Twelfth Century to the Present Time (London, John Murray).
- Jules de Saint-Genois, Profils et portraits

== Births ==
- 12 January – Charles Lemonnier, politician (died 1930)
- 24 February – Max Waller, writer (died 1889)
- 11 March – Rodolphe Wytsman, painter (died 1927)
- 2 April – Paul Costermans, colonial administrator (died 1905)
- 13 April – James Ensor, painter (died 1949)
- 2 May – Heva Coomans, painter (died 1939)
- 23 June – Albert Giraud, poet (died 1929)
- 28 June – Aloïs Biebuyck, officer (died 1944)
- 12 August – Ernest Baert, explorer (died 1894)
- 26 August – Luis Siret, archaeologist (died 1934)
- 4 December – Charles de Broqueville, politician (died 1940)
- 15 December – Alphonse Michaux, engraver (died 1928)
- 30 December – Leon Mazy, muralist (died 1938)

== Deaths ==
- 1 April – Joseph Guislain (born 1797), physician
- 20 April – Charles de Brouckère (born 1796), politician
- 27 April – John E. Blox (born 1810), Jesuit
- 11 September – Jean-Baptiste Masui (born 1798), civil engineer
- 27 September – Charles-Joseph, 4th Duke d'Ursel (born 1777), politician
- 10 October – Jules Victor Génisson (born 1805), painter
- 13 October – Egide Linnig (born 1821), artist
- 22 October – Pieter Vanderghinste (born 1789), composer
