= 1863 in Belgium =

- Decades: 1840s; 1850s; 1860s; 1870s; 1880s
- See also: Other events of 1863; List of years in Belgium

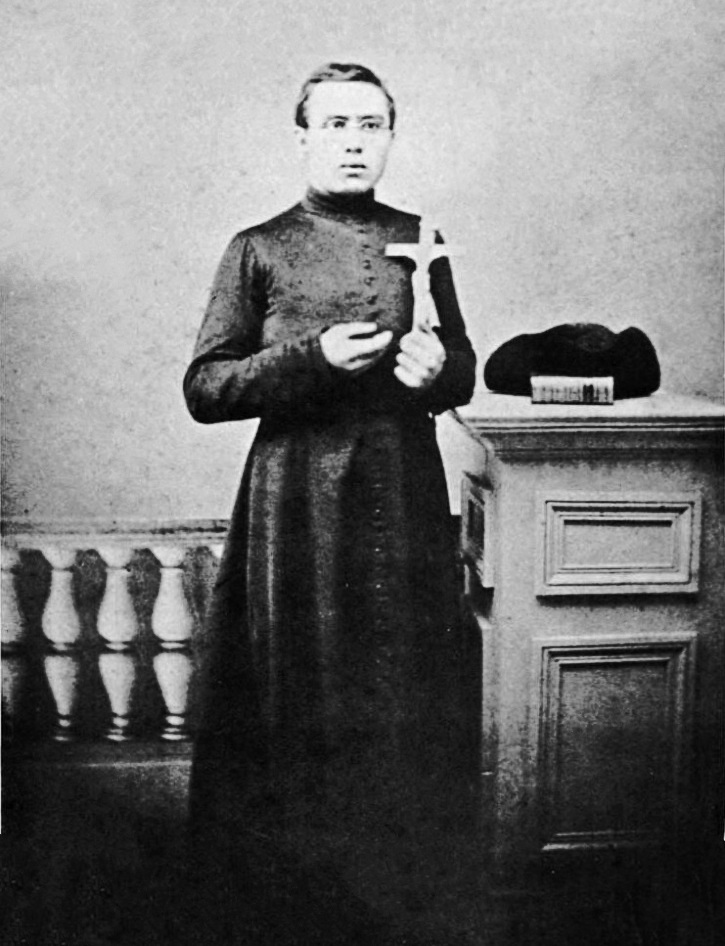
Damien

Events in the year 1863 in Belgium.

== Incumbents ==
Monarch: Leopold I
Head of government: Charles Rogier

== Events ==
- 9 April – Treaty of amity, commerce and navigation with the Kingdom of Italy signed in Turin.
- 12 May – Commercial treaty with the Netherlands, including Dutch agreement to perpetual abolition of tolls on the Scheldt river in return for a payment of 17 million guilders
- 20 May – Commercial treaty with the United States, bringing relations into line with the free trade agreements already signed with France (1861), the United Kingdom (1862) and the Netherlands (1863).
- 9 June – Partial legislative elections of 1863
- 16 July – Multilateral treaty for the redemption of the Scheldt tolls signed in Brussels
- 27 July – Commercial treaty with the Austrian Empire, bringing relations into line with the free trade agreements already signed with France (1861), the United Kingdom (1862) and the Netherlands (1863).
- 1 August – Clipper Marnix van Sinte-Aldegonde the first ship to sail toll-free from Antwerp to the mouth of the Scheldt.
- 11 August – State visit of Queen Victoria to Belgium.
- 18-22 August – First Catholic Congress in Mechelen.
  - Guild of Saint Thomas and Saint Luke for the study and promotion of Christian art founded
- 19 September – Convention modifying the 1852 postal convention between Belgium and the Office of the Prince of Tour and Taxis signed in Brussels.
- 26 December – Solvay chemical company founded.

== Publications ==
Periodicals

- Annuaire de l'Observatoire Royal de Bruxelles, vol. 31
- La Belgique Horticole, edited by Édouard Morren
- Bulletin du Bibliophile Belge, vol. 19, edited by A. Scheler (Brussels, F. Heussner)
- Bulletins de l'Académie royale des sciences, des lettres et des beaux-arts de Belgique, second series, vol. 15
- Collection de précis historiques, vol. 12, edited by Edouard Terwecoren S.J.
- Dubbele wegwyzer der stad Gent en der provincie Oost-Vlaenderen, vol. 1 (Ghent, Vanderhaeghen)
- Revue belge et étrangère, 15
- Revue Trimestrielle, vol. 38
- Le Timbre-Poste begins publication

Studies and reports

- Prosper de Haulleville, Les Catholiques et les libertés constitutionnelles en Belgique
- Émile de Laveleye, Essai sur l'économie rurale de la Belgique

Historical editions

- Louis Galesloot, Procès de François Anneessens: doyen du corps des métiers de Bruxelles, vol. 2 (Brussels and The Hague)
- Jehan le Bel, Les vrayes chroniques, edited by Lambert Polain, vol. 1

== Art and architecture ==
Performances

- 3 January – First performance of Charles Hugo's stage adaptation of Les Misèrables, Théâtre Royal des Galeries, Brussels

== Births ==
- 10 January – Félix Wielemans, soldier (died 1917)
- 3 February – Charles Magnette, politician (died 1937)
- 8 March – Théophile Bovy, journalist (died 1937)
- 3 April – Henry van de Velde, painter (died 1957)
- 21 April – Paul Lebrun, composer (died 1920)
- 25 June – Émile Francqui, philanthropist (died 1935)
- 26 June
  - Paul Pelseneer, biologist (died 1945)
  - Henri Quersin, marksman (died 1944)
- 13 August – Pol Demade, writer (died 1936)
- 21 August – Jules Destrée, politician (died 1936)
- 1 September – Herman Baltia, soldier (died 1938)
- 14 November – Leo Baekeland, chemist (died 1944)
- 10 December – Maurice Hennequin, playwright (died 1926)

== Deaths ==
- 8 February – Martin Martens (born 1797), botanist and chemist
- 14 May – Emmanuel Noterman (born 1808), painter
- 18 July – Arnold Timothée de Lasaulx (born 1774), politician
- 19 July – André-Napoléon Fontainas (born 1807), politician
- 26 September – Jean Thienpont (born 1774), politician
- 31 October – Augustus Van Dievoet (born 1803), judge
