= 1866 in Belgium =

- Decades: 1840s; 1850s; 1860s; 1870s; 1880s
- See also: Other events of 1866; List of years in Belgium

Events in the year 1866 in Belgium.

== Incumbents ==
Monarch: Leopold II
Head of government: Charles Rogier

== Events ==
January

- 7 January – Le Peuple (predecessor organisation of Belgian Labour Party) joins First International.
- 28 January – "Manifeste des ouvriers", drafted by Edmond Picard, calls for universal manhood suffrage.

March

- 6 March – Belgian-Chinese Treaty of Amity, Commerce and Navigation ratified in Brussels.

May

- 28 May – Provincial elections
- 31 May – Strikes and lock-outs decriminalised.

June

- Fresh outbreaks in Brussels, Ghent and Antwerp of 1863–75 cholera pandemic.
- 12 June – Partial legislative elections of 1866
- 15 June – Contract signed for Covering of the Senne

August

- 1 August – Treaty of Amity, Commerce and Navigation between Japan and Belgium, negotiated by Auguste t'Kint, signed in Edo.
- 27 August – Antwerp city council makes Dutch the official language of city business.

October

- 20 October – State banquet at Brussels for British Volunteers on visit to Belgium.
- 21 October – Risk Allah Bey brought to trial in Brussels on charges of murder and forgery.

December

- 20 December – Parliamentary enquiry into preparedness of armed forces begins.
- 27 December – Belgian-Japanese Treaty of Amity, Commerce and Navigation ratified in Brussels.

== Publications ==
Periodicals

- Almanach royal officiel (Brussels, H. Tarlier)
- Collection de précis historiques, vol. 15, edited by Edouard Terwecoren S.J.
- Messager des sciences historiques.

Reference works

- Biographie Nationale de Belgique begins publication.

Books

- Charles Baudelaire, Les Épaves (Brussels)
- Louis Galesloot, Pierre-Albert et Jean de Launay, Hérauts d'Armes du Duché de Brabant, Histoire de leurs procès, 1643-1687 (Brussels)
- Victor Hugo, Travailleurs de la Mer (Brussels)
- Jules de Saint-Genois, Les Flamands d'autrefois

Maps

- Auguste Stessels, Carte générale des bancs de Flandres compris entre Gravelines et l'embouchure de l'Escaut [Map of the sandbanks of the Flemish coast between Gravelines and the mouth of the Scheldt], engraved by J. Nauwens (Antwerp, F. Bizolier)

== Art and architecture ==
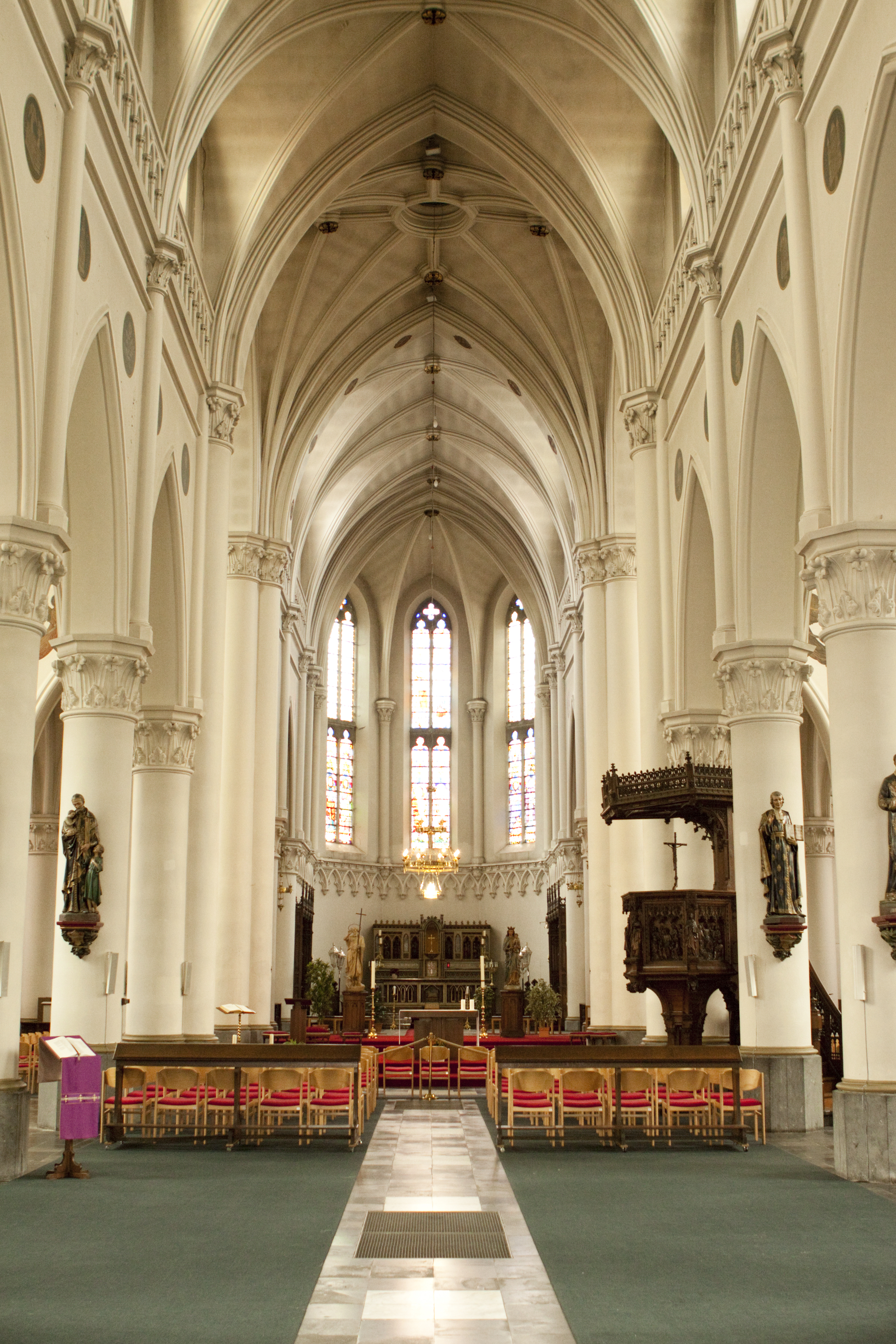
Church of St John the Baptist (interior)

Buildings

- St John the Baptist's church, Ghent (Gothic Revival parish church)

== Births ==
- 9 January – Albert Baertsoen, painter (died 1922)
- 25 January – Emile Vandervelde, politician (died 1938)
- 27 April – Émile Royer, politician (died 1916)
- 5 July – Maurice Houtart, politician (died 1939)
- 14 July – Juliette Wytsman, painter (died 1925)
- 2 August – Adrien de Gerlache, Antarctic explorer (died 1934)
- 14 August – Charles Jean de la Vallée Poussin, mathematician (died 1962)
- 10 December – Louise De Hem, painter (died 1922)

== Deaths ==
Date uncertain

- Joseph Abbeel (born 1786), veteran of Napoleon's Russian campaign

March

- 24 March – Jean-Baptist David (born 1801), literary scholar
