= 1868 in Belgium =

- Decades: 1840s; 1850s; 1860s; 1870s; 1880s
- See also: Other events of 1868; List of years in Belgium

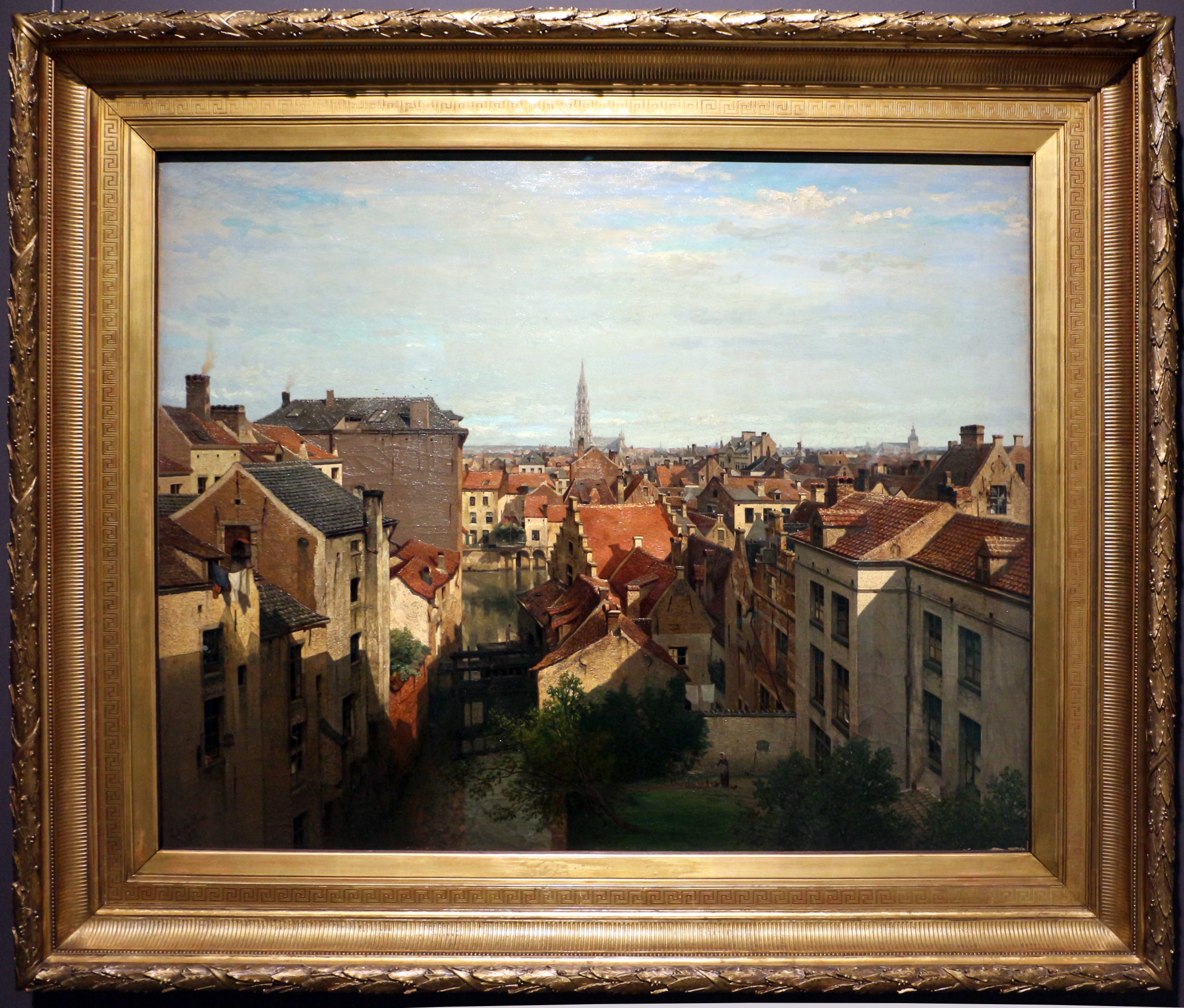
Jean-Baptiste Van Moer, Brussels in 1868 (1872)

Events in the year 1868 in Belgium.

== Incumbents ==
Monarch: Leopold II
Head of government: Charles Rogier (to 3 January); Walthère Frère-Orban (from 3 January)

== Events ==
January

- 3 January – Walthère Frère-Orban replaces Charles Rogier as Prime Minister
- 28 January – Victor-Auguste-Isidor Deschamps enthroned as Archbishop of Mechelen.

March

- 1 March – Société Libre des Beaux-Arts founded.
- 24 March – 20 killed when soldiers shoot on striking miners from the Epine mine in Dampremy.

May

- 25 May – Provincial elections

June

- 9 June – Partial legislative elections of 1868

August

- 6 August – 47 miners killed by a fire damp explosion in the Sainte Henriette mine near Jemappes.

September

- 7 September – Third international workers congress opens in Brussels.

October

- 23 October – Frederick Doulton, MP, brought to trial in Brussels on charges of fraud in public works, but acquitted of having broken any law.

== Publications ==
Periodicals

- Almanach royal officiel (Brussels, E. Guyot)
- Collection de précis historiques, vol. 17, edited by Edouard Terwecoren S.J.
- Socialist daily newspaper De Werker launched in Antwerp (October).

Series

- Biographie Nationale de Belgique, vol. 2

History

- Charles Niellon, Histoire des événements militaires et des conspirations orangistes de la révolution en Belgique de 1830 à 1833 (Brussels, M.J. Poot)

Literature

- Maria Doolaeghe, Winterbloemen

== Art and architecture ==
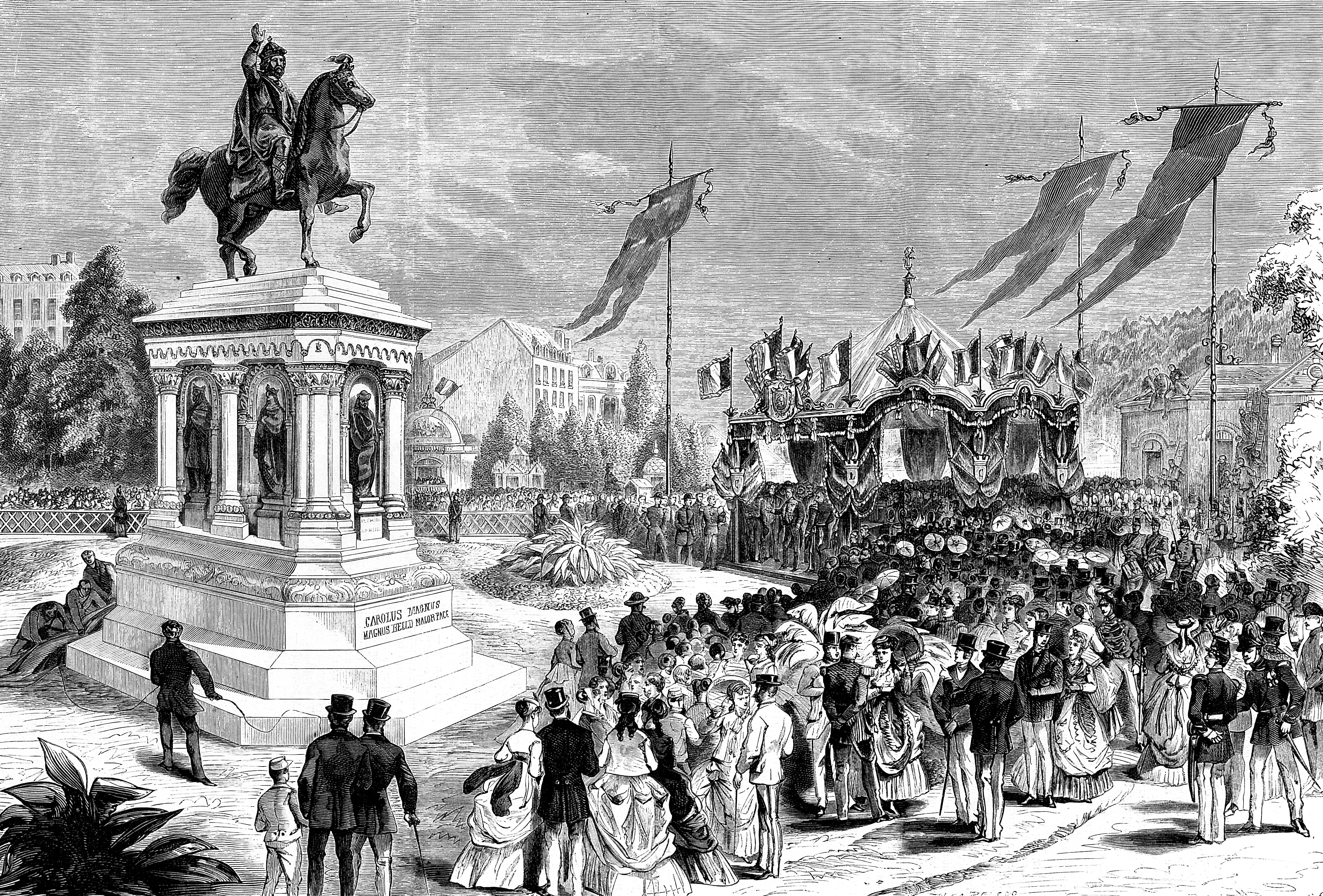
Inauguration of Louis Jehotte's equestrian statue of Charlemagne in Liège

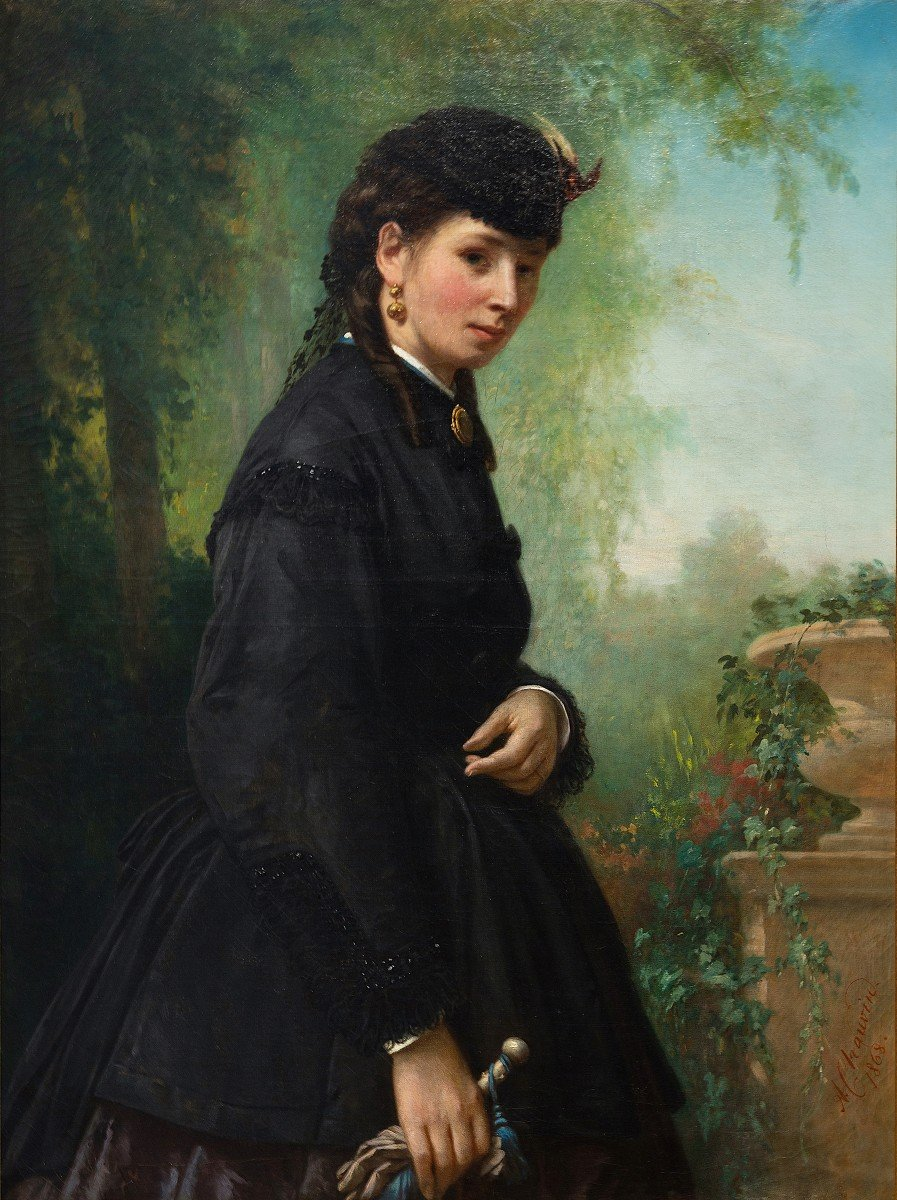
Auguste Chauvin, Portrait of Coraline (1868)

- Société Libre des Beaux-Arts founded

Paintings

- Auguste Chauvin, Portrait of Coraline
- Charles-Philogène Tschaggeny, The Covered Wagon

Sculptures

- Louis Jehotte's equestrian statue of Charlemagne inaugurated in Liège

== Births ==
- 11 January – François Ruhlmann, conductor (died 1948)
- 5 February – Lodewijk Mortelmans, composer (died 1952)
- 23 February – Paul Bergmans, librarian (died 1935)
- 5 March – Prosper Poullet, politician (died 1937)
- 27 April – Herman Vander Linden, politician (died 1956)
- 18 June – Anna Kernkamp, artist (died 1947)
- 23 August – Paul Otlet, bibliographer (died 1944)
- 15 November – Marguerite Putsage, painter (died 1946)
- 28 November – Louis Franck, politician (died 1937)

== Deaths ==
- 13 February – Dieudonné Stas (born 1791), newspaperman
- 17 April – Guillaume-Hippolyte van Volxem (born 1791), politician
- 30 April – Charles Le Hon (born 1792), politician
- 9 July – Toussaint-Henry-Joseph Fafchamps (born 1783), military inventor
- 21 July – Édouard Ducpétiaux (born 1804), prison reformer
