= 1864 in Belgium =

- Decades: 1840s; 1850s; 1860s; 1870s; 1880s
- See also: Other events of 1864; List of years in Belgium

Events in the year 1864 in Belgium.

== Incumbents ==
Monarch: Leopold I
Head of government: Charles Rogier

== Events ==
- Belgian State Railways Type 1 taken into use

February

- 4 February – Belgian Red Cross founded

April

- Charles Baudelaire moves to Brussels.

May

- 21 May – Father Damien ordained in Honolulu
- 23 May – Provincial elections
- 29 May – Princess Charlotte lands in Mexico to become Empress as consort of Maximilian I of Mexico

July

- 11 July – Federation of Catholic Circles and Conservative Associations formed (later to become the more formalised Catholic Party)

August

- 11 August – 1864 Belgian general election, won by Liberal Party
- 29 August – Catholic Congress in Mechelen opens (to 3 September)

September

- Exhibition of medieval, Renaissance and contemporary religious art in Mechelen.

October

- 16 October – Belgian Legion embark for Mexico to take part in the Second French intervention in Mexico

== Sports ==
- Royal Athletics Association Ghent founded

== Publications ==
Periodicals

- Annales du bibliophile belge begins publication.
- Analectes pour servir à l'histoire ecclésiastique de la Belgique begins publication, edited by Mgr. De Ram.
- Antwerpsch Archievenblad begins publication.
- Bulletins de l'Académie royale des sciences, des lettres et des beaux-arts de Belgique, Volume 17 (Brussels, M. Hayez).
- Collection de précis historiques, vol. 13, edited by Edouard Terwecoren S.J.

Pamphlets

- Réflexions sur les conséquences probables de l'expédition mexicaine (Brussels).

Literary works

- Clémentine Louant, Poésies
- Auguste Louwage, Les trois soeurs Flamandes. Gand, Bruges, Anvers: trilogie nationale (Ghent, F. & E. Gyselynck).

Scholarly editions

- Pierre Joseph Le Boucq, Histoire des troubles advenues à Valenciennes à cause des hérésies, 1562-1579, edited by A.-P.-L. de Robaulx de Soumoy (Brussels, Ghent and Leipzig).

== Births ==
- 11 January – Henri Daco, painter (died 1932)
- 26 March – Louis Reckelbus, painter (died 1958)
- 21 May – Princess Stéphanie of Belgium (died 1945)
- 22 May – Josue Dupon, sculptor (died 1935)
- 26 July – Frédéric Alvin, numismatist (died 1949)
- 10 October – Blanche Arral, soprano (died 1945)
- 22 October – Eugène Laermans, painter (died 1940)
- 2 November – Oscar Roels, composer (died 1938)
- 28 November – Léon van Hout, musician (died 1945)

== Deaths ==
- 19 February – Ferdinand Lecouvet (born 1827), bibliographer.
- 23 March – Jean-Baptiste Malou (born 1806), bishop
- 5 April – Louis Roelandt (born 1786), architect
- 27 May – Léandre Desmaisières (born 1794), politician
- 1 September – Jean Kickx (born 1803), botanist
- 2 October – Louis-Joseph Delebecque (born 1798), bishop of Ghent
