= 1867 in Belgium =

- Decades: 1840s; 1850s; 1860s; 1870s; 1880s
- See also: Other events of 1867; List of years in Belgium

Events in the year 1867 in Belgium.

== Incumbents ==
Monarch: Leopold II
Head of government: Charles Rogier

== Events ==
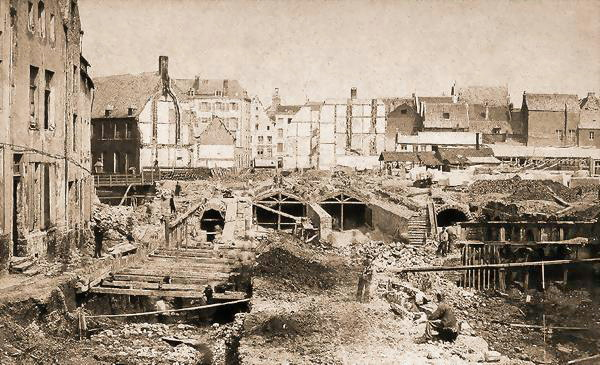
Work on the covering of the Senne in Brussels, 1867

February

- 2 February – Mines across the Charleroi coalfield closed by strikes.
- 13 February – Work starts on Covering of the Senne in Brussels
- 23 February – Commercial treaty with the Austrian Empire, mutually granting most favoured nation status.

April

- 25 April – Prince Philippe, Count of Flanders, marries Princess Marie of Hohenzollern-Sigmaringen

May

- 11 May – Treaty of London establishes independence of Luxembourg; Prussian forces evacuated from Grand-Duchy.
- 17 May – New criminal code published.
- 19 May – Paper ballots introduced in elections.

July

- Delhaize Brothers begin trading.
- 11-18 July – 2,400 Belgian Volunteers visit London, received by the Lord Mayor, entertained by the Wimbledon Volunteers, and a ball held in their honour at the Agricultural Hall, Islington, attended by Prince Albert.

August

- 2 August – Peter Benoit becomes head of the Antwerp conservatory.

September

- 2-7 September – Third Catholic Congress in Mechelen.

December

- 8 December – Victor-Auguste-Isidor Deschamps named Archbishop of Mechelen in succession to the recently deceased Engelbert Sterckx (enthroned 28 January 1868).

== Art and architecture ==
Euphrosine Beernaert, Pond in Villers-la-Ville (1867), now in M – Museum Leuven

- September – Exhibition of Old Masters in Bruges, organised by the Guild of Saint Thomas and Saint Luke

Buildings

St Gertrude's, Wetteren

- Church of St Gertrude, Wetteren

Paintings

Alfred Stevens, Hesitation (c. 1867), Art Institute of Chicago

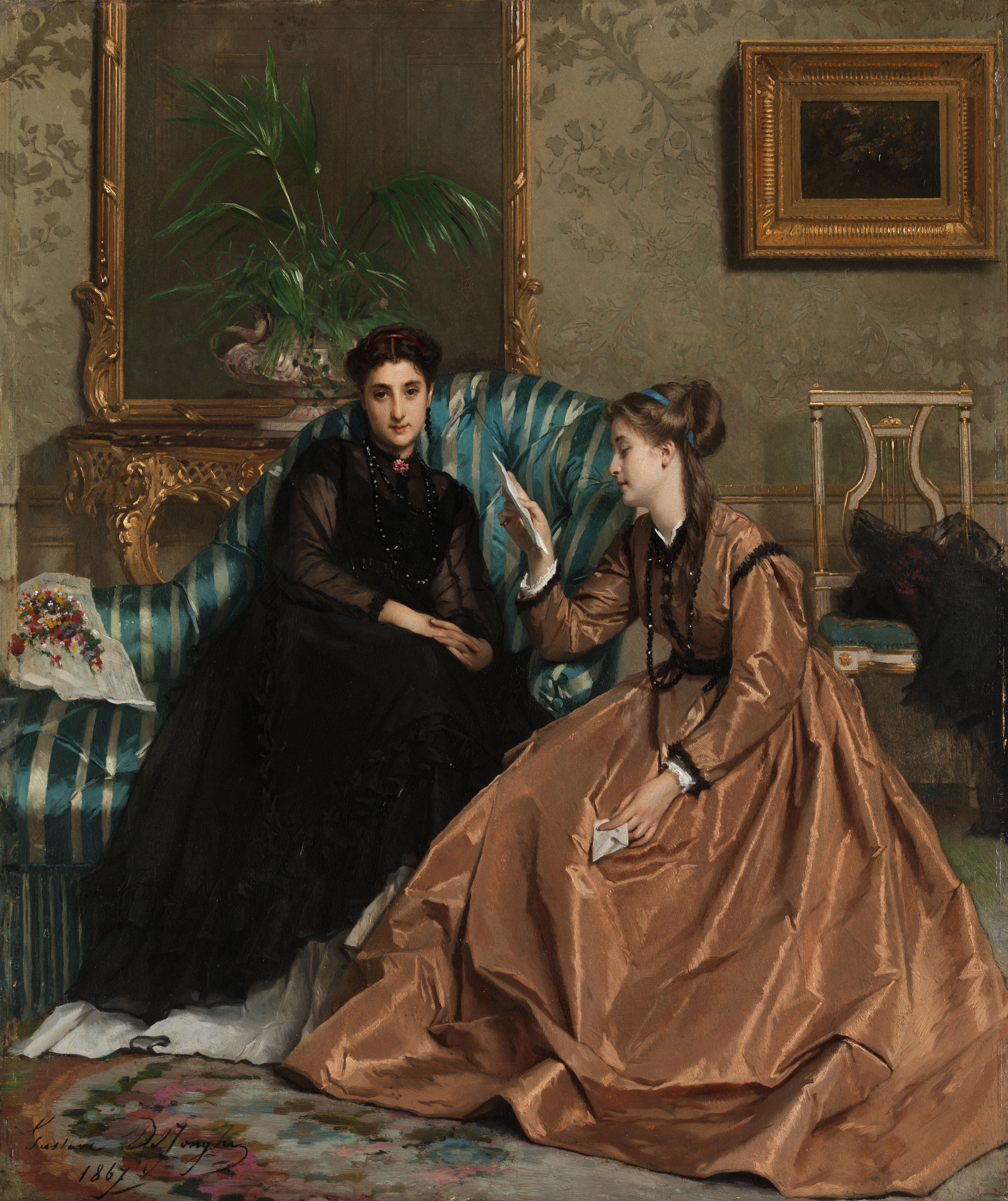
Gustave Léonard de Jonghe, The Love Letter (1867)

Constantin Meunier, Saint Stephen (1867), Royal Museum of Fine Arts Antwerp

- Euphrosine Beernaert, Pond in Villers-la-Ville
- Gustave Léonard de Jonghe, The Love Letter
- Constantin Meunier, Saint Stephen
- Alfred Stevens, Hesitation

== Publications ==
Periodicals

- Almanach royal officiel (Brussels, E. Guyot)
- Annales des travaux publics de Belgique, vol. 25
- Bulletin de la Société royale de botanique de Belgique, vol. 6
- Le Catholique, vol. 2
- Collection de précis historiques, 16, edited by Edouard Terwecoren

Books

- Charles De Coster, La Légende d'Uylenspiegel (Brussels)

== Births ==
- 19 January – Jean Delville, painter (died 1953)
- 28 February – William Degouve de Nuncques, painter (died 1935)
- 2 April – Louise Danse, painter (died 1948)
- 6 April – Maurice De Wulf, philosopher (died 1947)
- 15 May – Jef Leempoels, painter (died 1935)
- 27 May – Anna De Weert, painter (died 1950)
- 4 August – Valerius de Saedeleer, painter (died 1941)
- 7 August – Léo d'Ursel, diplomat (died 1934)
- 10 August – Bruno Destrée, monk-poet (died 1919)
- 21 June – Meyrianne Héglon, opera singer (died 1942)
- 8 November
  - Léopold Charlier, violinist (died 1936)
  - Léon Houa, cyclist (died 1918)
- 27 December – Léon Delacroix, prime minister (died 1929)

== Deaths ==
- 10 January – Alfred Mosselman (born 1810), industrialist
- 2 March – Frans-Andries Durlet (born 1816), architect
- 4 June – Jan Teichmann (born 1788), engineer
- 10 September – Jules de Saint-Genois (born 1813), politician
- 12 November – Charles Frédéric Dubois (born 1804), naturalist
- 4 December – Engelbert Sterckx (born 1792), archbishop
