= 1863 Belgian general election =

- 9 June 1863

58 of the 116 seats in the Chamber of Representatives 57 seats needed for a majority
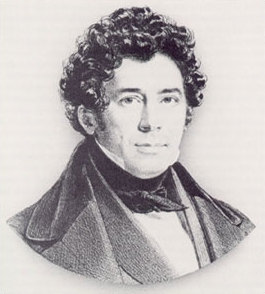

| | First party | Second party |
|---|---|---|
| Leader | Charles Rogier |
| Party | Liberal | Catholic |
| Leader since | Candidate for PM |
| Seats before | 66 seats | 50 seats |
| Seats won | 24 | 34 |
| Seats after | 59 | 57 |
| Seat change | ▼7 | ▲7 |
| Popular vote | 17,799 | 21,310 |
| Percentage | 45.51% | 54.49% |
Government before election
Rogier II
Liberal
Government after election
Rogier II
Liberal

Partial general elections were held in Belgium on 9 June 1863. The result was a victory for the Liberal Party, which won 59 of the 116 seats in the Chamber of Representatives and 33 of the 58 seats in the Senate. Voter turnout was 74.5%, although only 52,519 people were eligible to vote.

Under the alternating system, elections for the Chamber of Representatives were only held in five out of the nine provinces: Antwerp, Brabant, Luxembourg, Namur and West Flanders. Additionally, special elections were held in the arrondissements of Tournai, Ghent and Hasselt.

== Results ==
=== Chamber of Representatives ===
| Party | Votes | % | Seats | | |
| Party | Votes | % | Won | Total | +/– |
|---|---|---|---|---|---|
| Catholics | 21,310 | 54.49 | 34 | 57 | +7 |
| Liberal Party | 17,799 | 45.51 | 24 | 59 | –7 |
| Total | 39,109 | 100.00 | 58 | 116 | 0 |
| Total votes | 39,109 | – | | | |
| Registered voters/turnout | 52,519 | 74.47 | | | |
Source: Mackie & Rose, Sternberger et al.

=== Senate ===
| Party | Seats |
|---|---|
| Liberal Party | 33 |
| Catholics | 25 |
| Total | 58 |
Source: Sternberger et al.
