= Evert Larock =

Belgian Impressionist painter

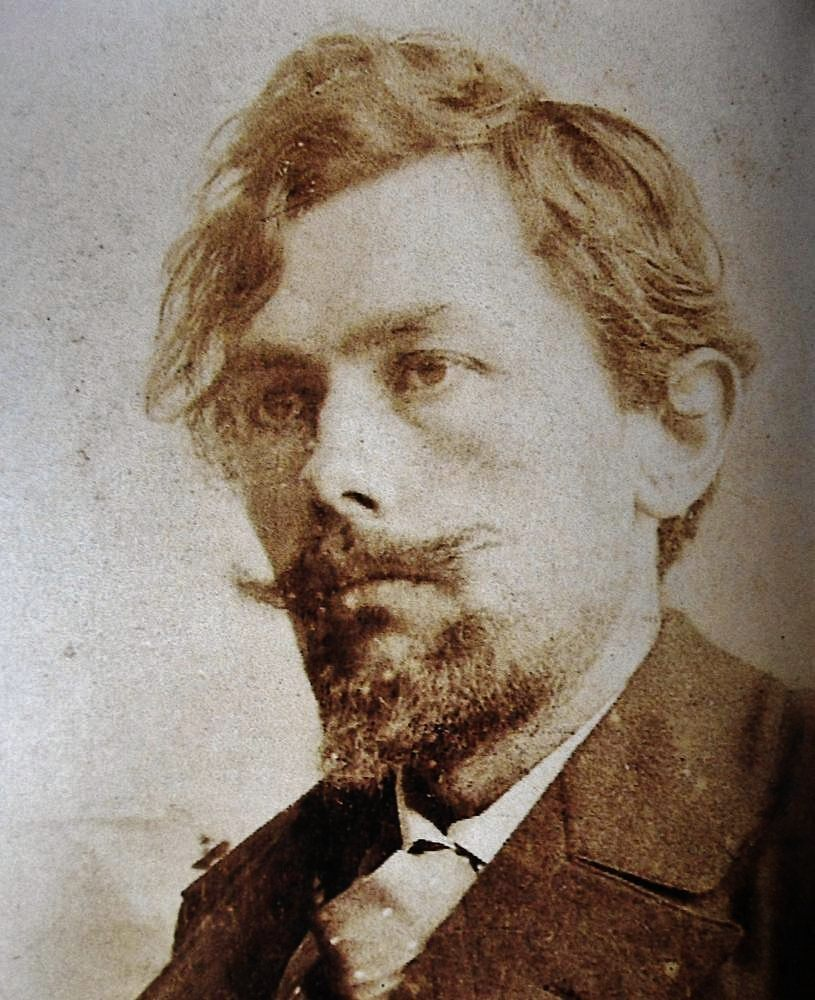
- Self portrait
- Born: Evert Larock; 21 May 1865; Kapelle-op-den-Bos, Belgium
- Died: 13 January 1901 (aged 35); Kapelle-op-den-Bos, Belgium
- Education: Royal Academy of Fine Arts of Antwerp
- Occupation: Painter

Everard Larock, known as Evert (21 May 1865 – 13 January 1901) was a Belgian Impressionist painter who belonged to the Secessionist art groups Als ik Kan and De XIII.

== Life and work ==
Larock was born in Kapelle-op-den-Bos. After much pleading, his father (a veterinarian) finally agreed to let him attend evening classes in drawing at the municipal academy in Mechelen. His success there led to evening classes at the Royal Academy of Fine Arts (Antwerp) while he worked in the studios of a decorative artist named Henri Verbuecken during the day.

During his military duty in 1884, he was diagnosed with tuberculosis and was exempted from any further service. He began taking day classes at the Academy, spending his evenings working and studying with Charles Verlat, where he first made contact with Frans Hens, Alexander Struys and other members of De XIII.

Despite his illness (and with the help of his friends), he managed to exhibit widely throughout Northern and Central Europe, and began to attract positive critical attention. The first meeting of the Belgian artists' group Kunst van Heden ("The Art of Today") in 1901 was essentially a tribute to his work. He was an early advocate of plein air painting and was influenced by the bright color scheme of Impressionism, but usually chose subjects that were more naturalistic in character.

When he became too ill to work he entered a sanatorium, but stayed for only a short time, preferring to die in his home town of Kapelle-op-den-Bos.

== Selected paintings ==
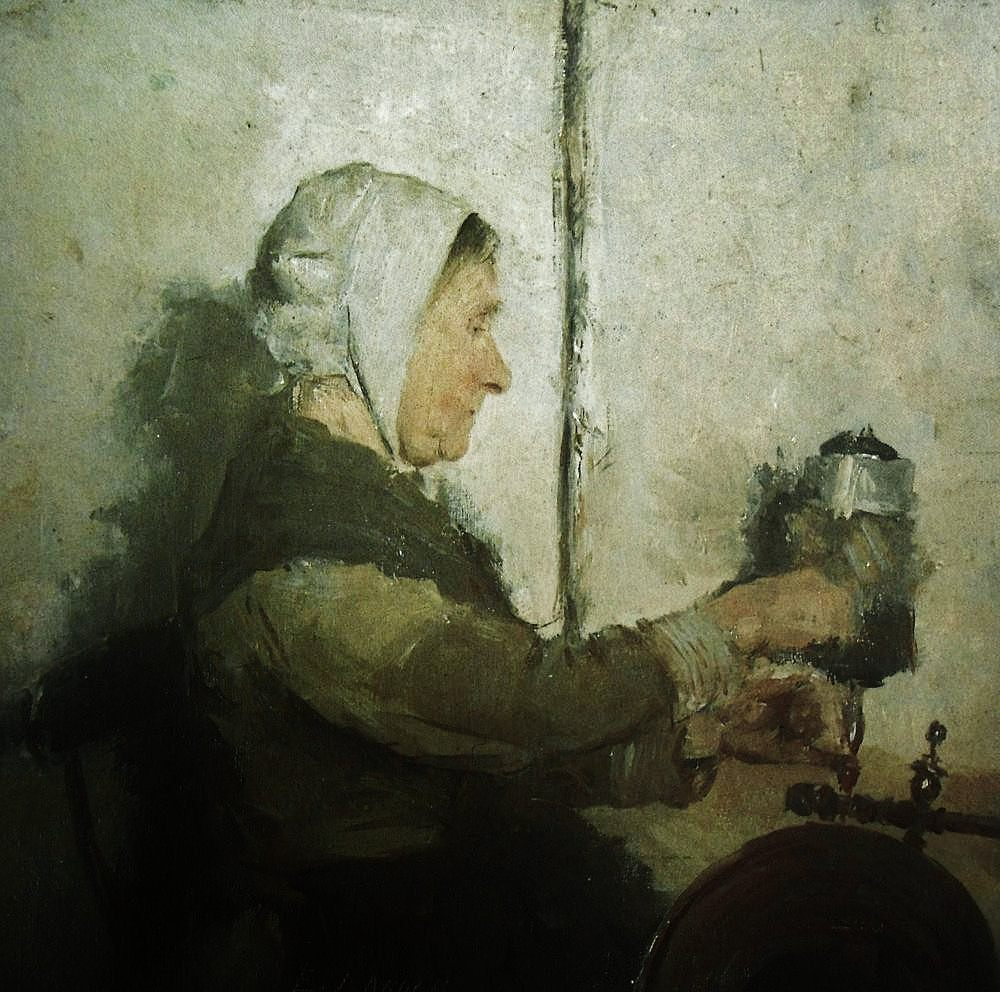
The Spinster

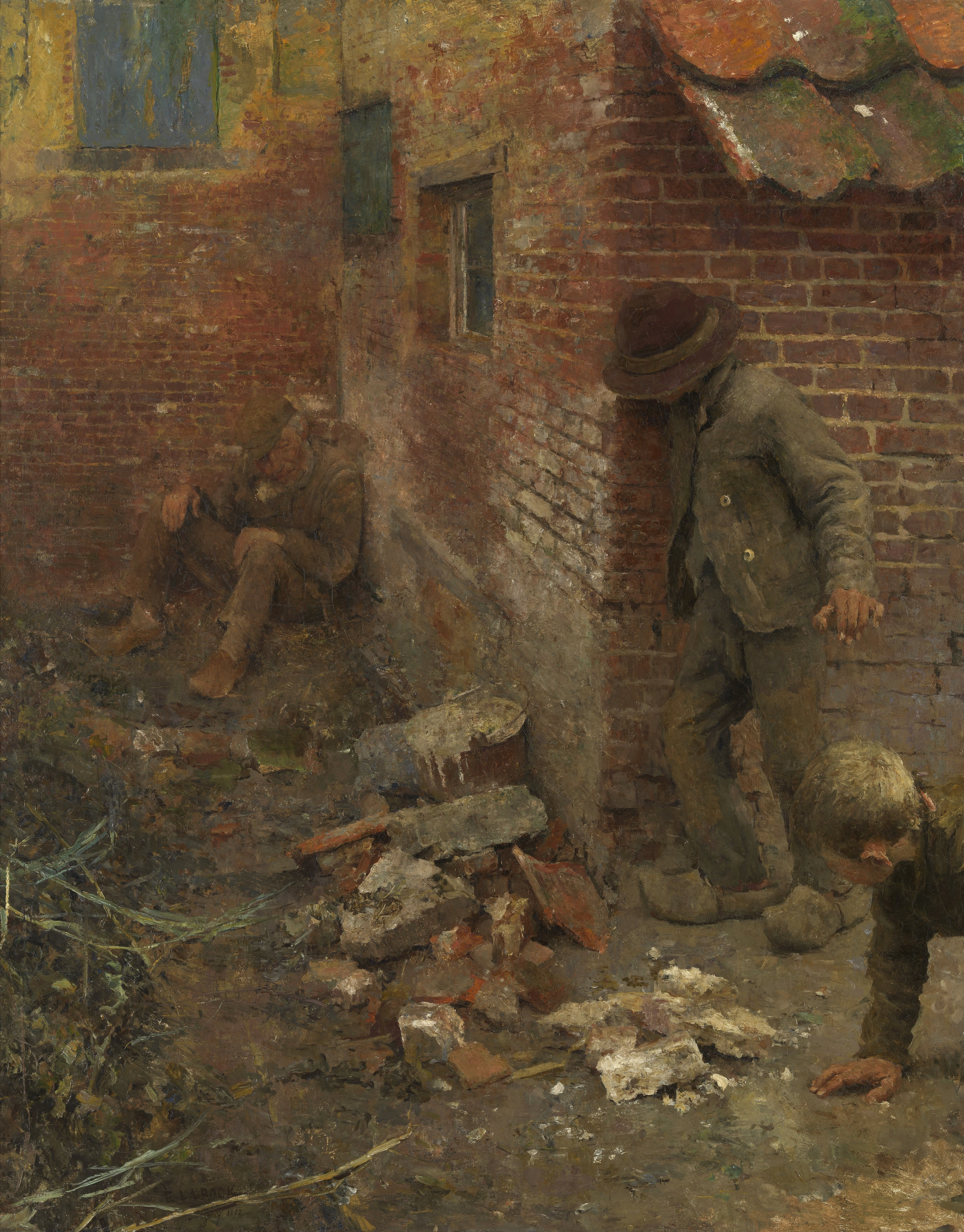
The Idiot (1892)

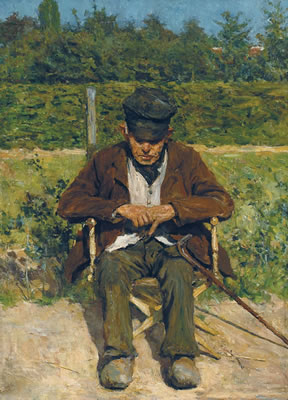
Sunbathing

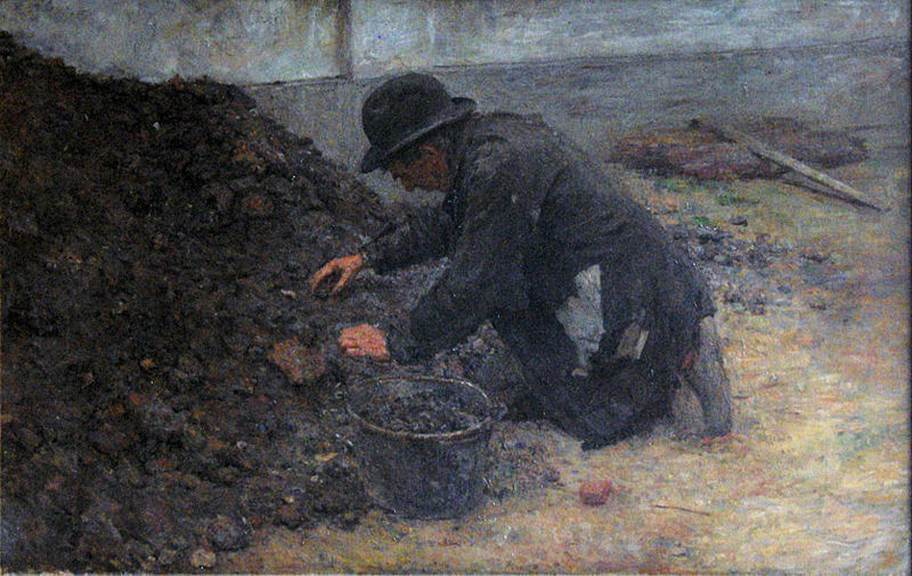
The Cinder Picker (1900)
