= Égide Rombaux =

Belgian symbolist sculptor

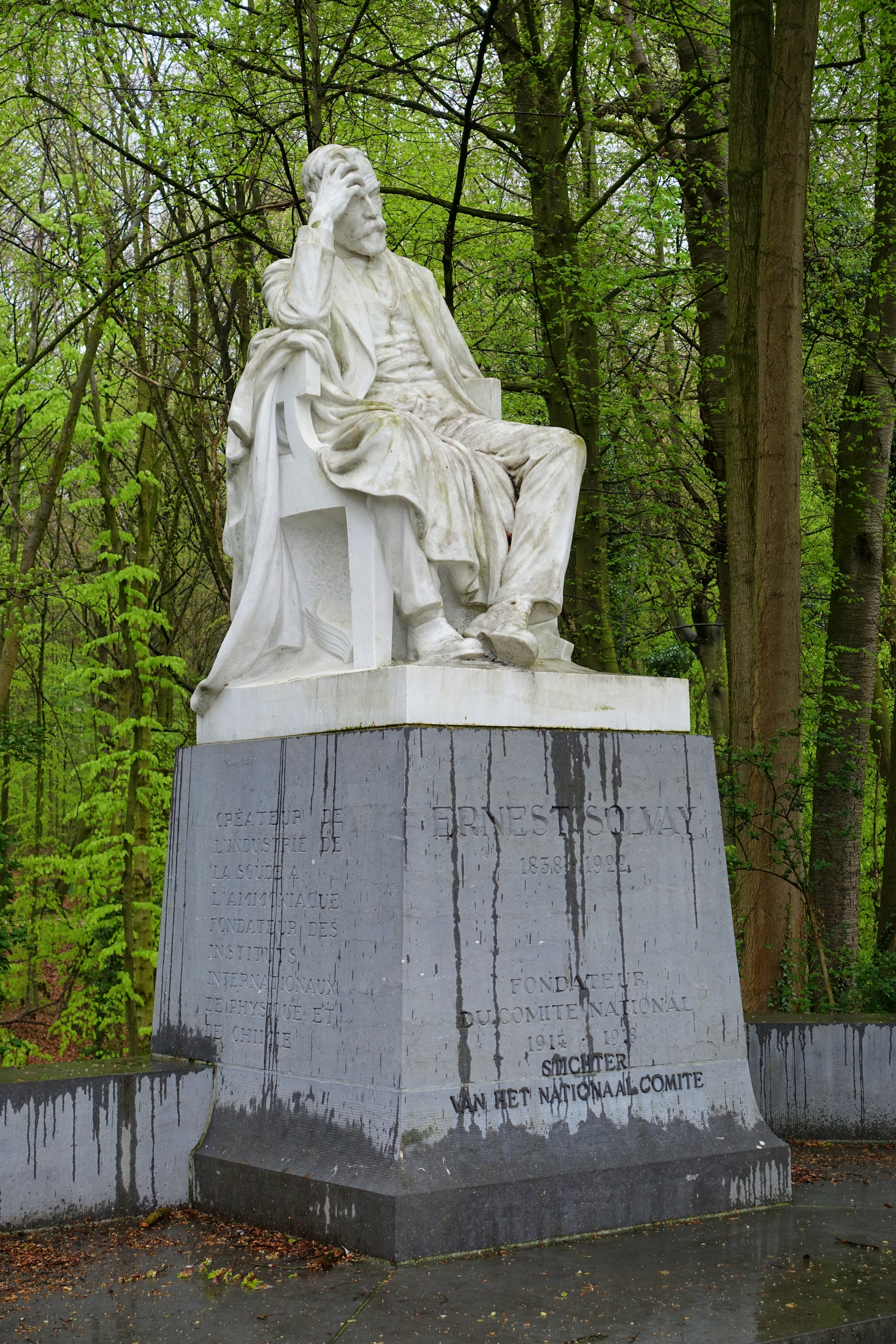
Ernest Solvay

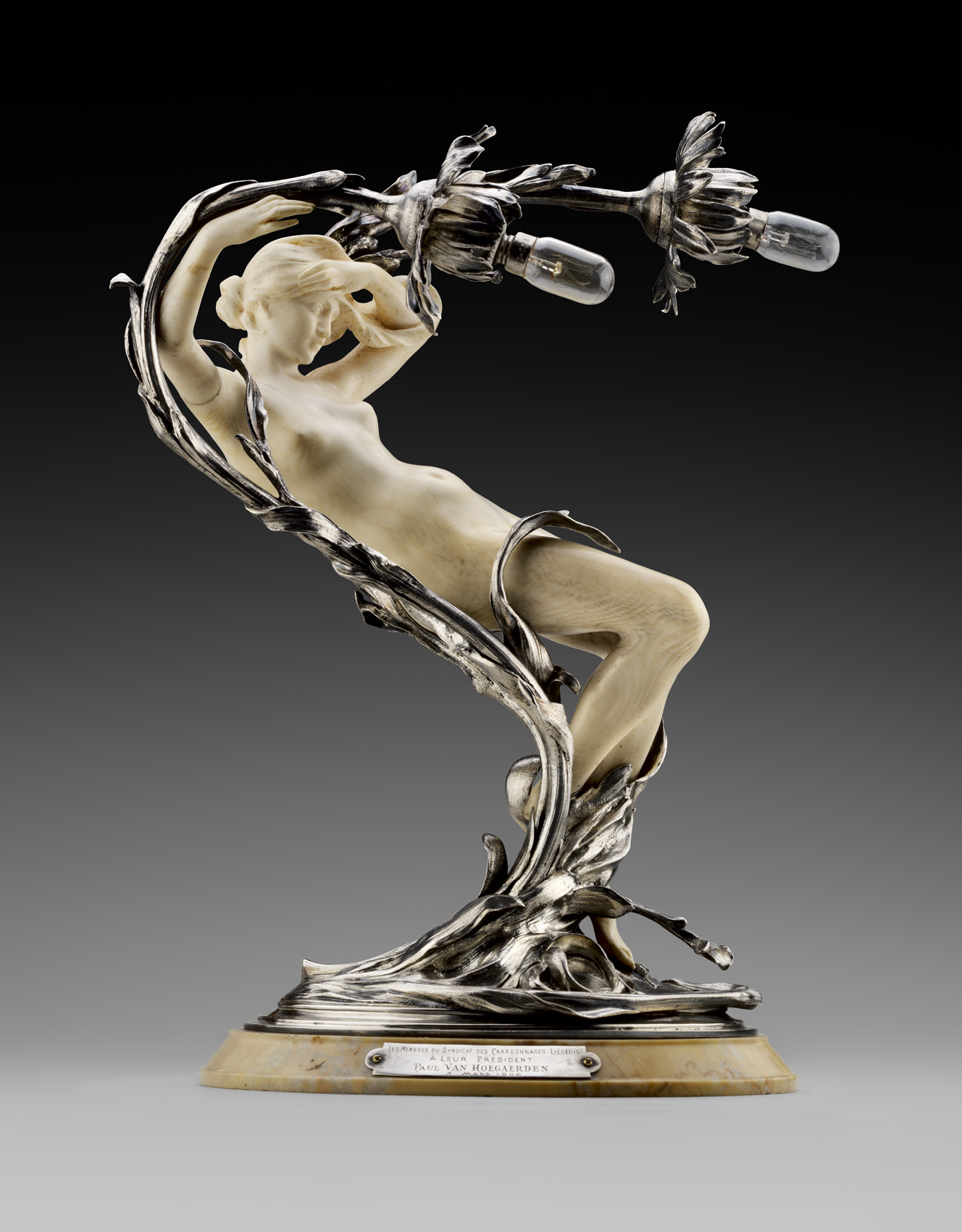
Lamp with a Nymph, collaboration with ironworker François Hoosemans. Made for the Exposition Universelle (Paris,1900). – Collection of the King Baudouin Foundation

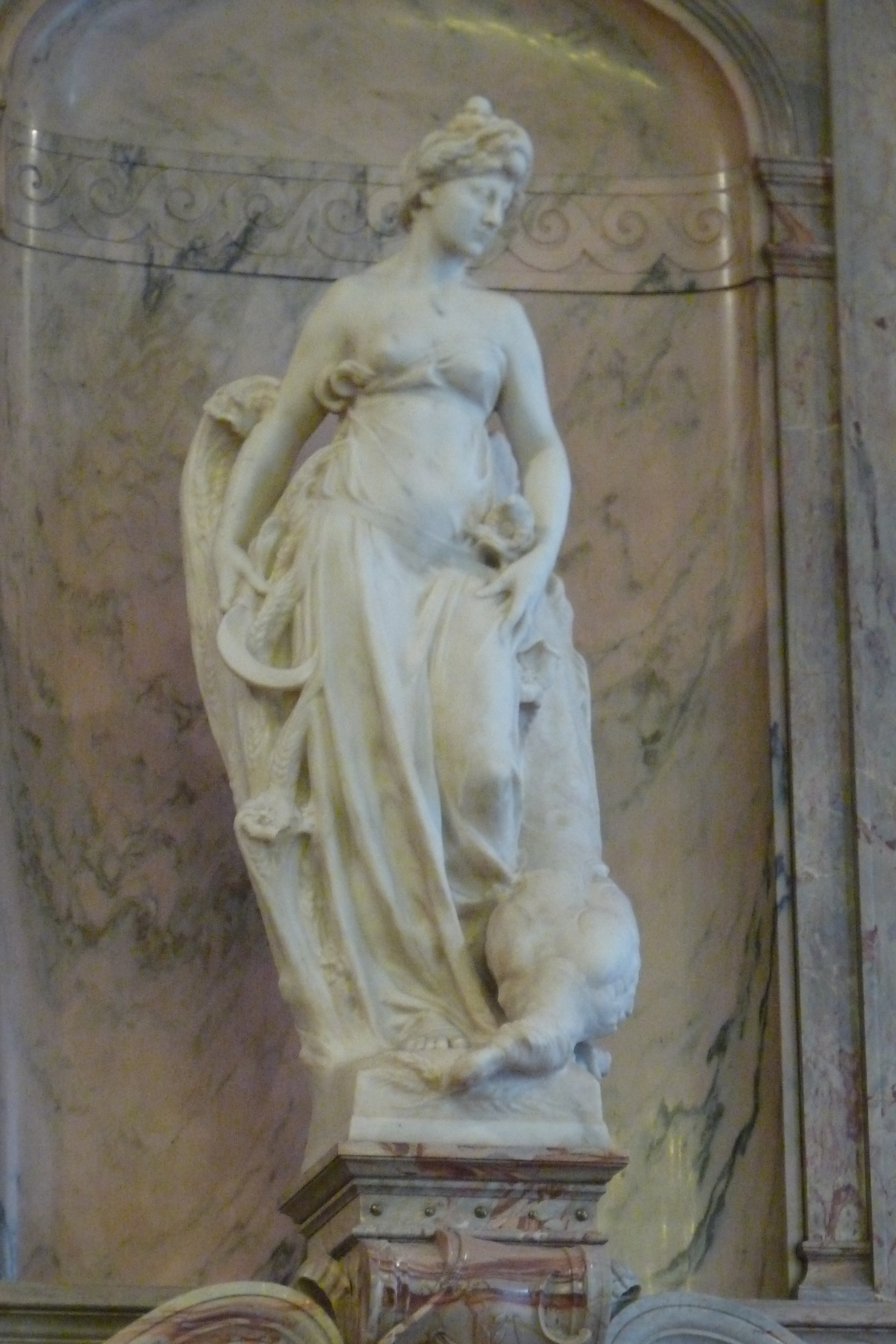
Ceres by Égide Rombaux

Égide Rombaux (19 January 1865 – 11 September 1942) was a Belgian symbolist sculptor.

Rombeaux was born in Schaerbeek on 19 January 1865. the son of the sculptor Felix Rombaux and Emerence–Rosalie Lemmens. He studies at the Academie des Beaux Arts in Brussels from 1879 while simultaneously working as an assistant to Albert Desenfans. He received his first commission in 1887; sculptures of Antoine van der Noot and Antoine van Grimbergen for Brussels Town Hall. He worked in Florence from 1889 to 1992. He returned to Brussels in 1895, and taught at the academies in Antwerp and Brussels.

Rombaux died in Uccle on 11 September 1942.

The First Morning, a 1913 marble by Rombaux is in the collection of the Tate Britain. The Royal Museums of Fine Arts of Belgium, which have a large selection of his work, have a study.

== Honours ==
- 1911: Member of the Royal Academy of Science, Letters and Fine Arts of Belgium.
- 1919: Commander of the Order Leopold.
- 1931: Grand Officer in the Order of the Crown.

=== Awards ===
At 17 years old, Rombaux was awarded the prix Godecharle in 1882. He won the Prix de Rome in 1891.

== Legacy ==
The Royal Academy of Science, Letters and Fine Arts of Belgium awards the triannual Prix Égide Rombaux, established in 1943, to a sculptor between 25 and 45 years old.
