= Arlon Synagogue =

Synagogue in Arlon, Belgium

- French: Synagogue d'Arlon
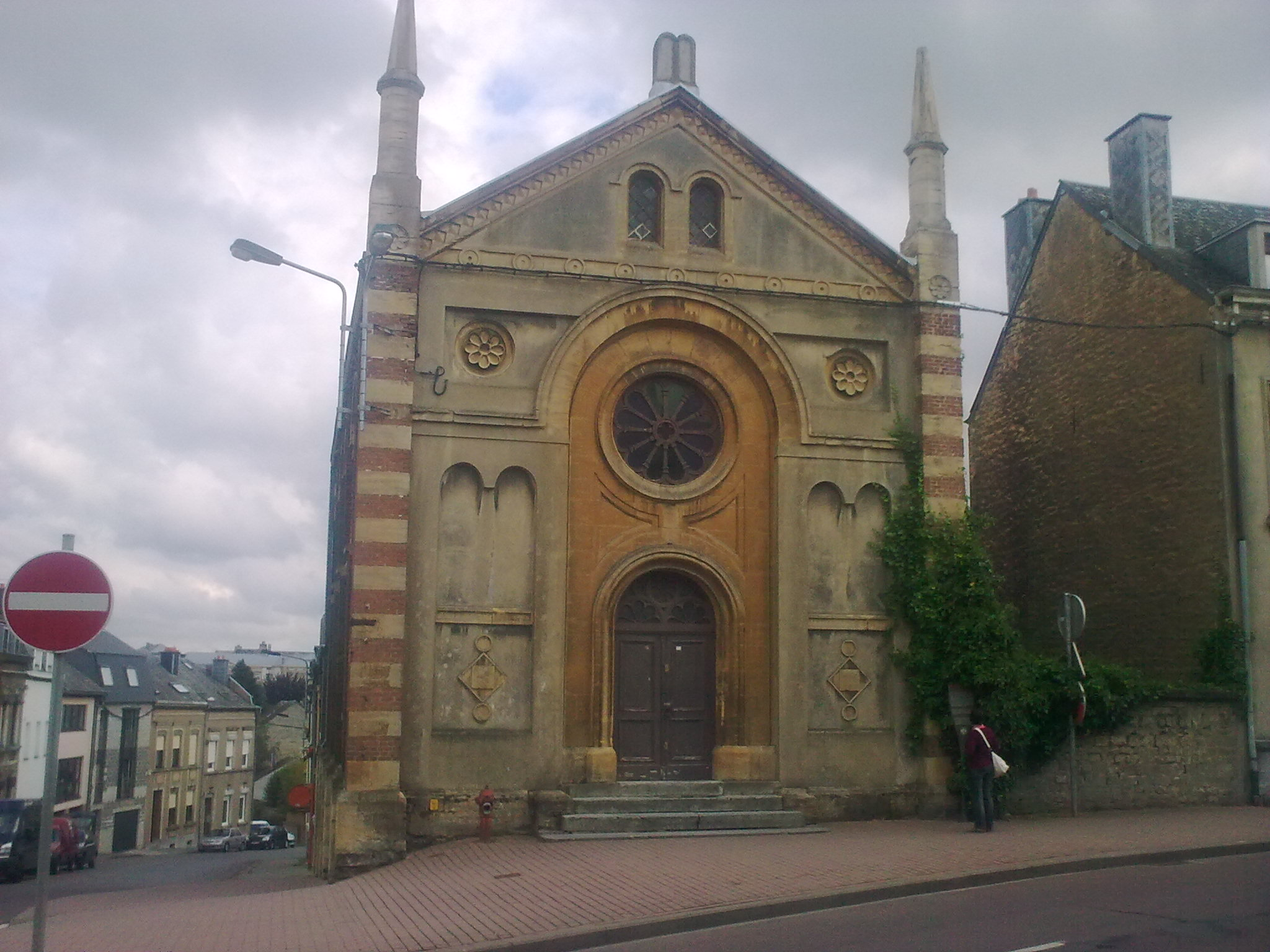
- The Arlon Synagogue in 2019

- Location of the synagogue in Belgium

Religion
- Affiliation: Judaism
- Ecclesiastical or organizational status: Synagogue
- Status: Active

Location
- Location: Rue de la Synagogue, Arlon
- Country: Belgium
- Interactive map of Arlon Synagogue
- Coordinates: 49°40′59″N 5°49′07″E

Architecture
- Architect: Albert Janot
- Type: Synagogue architecture
- Style: Romanesque Revival
- Established: 1818 (as a congregation)
- Completed: 1863
- Spire: Two

The Arlon Synagogue (French: Synagogue d'Arlon) is a Jewish congregation and synagogue, located in the town of Arlon, in the south of Belgium. It was built in 1863 and was the first synagogue in Belgium whose construction was funded primarily by public funds. On 28 November 2005, the synagogue was classified as a Major Heritage Building of Wallonia.

== History ==
There have been Jewish families in Arlon since 1808 but a synagogue was not built until 1863. Designed by Albert Janot in the Romanesque Revival style, it has two slim side towers and a tall central arch over the portal and rose window. It was the first synagogue in Belgium whose construction was funded primarily by public funds.

During the Second World War, many Jews were deported from Arlon but the synagogue itself was spared destruction. The building was turned into a straw depot. On 28 November 2005, the synagogue was classified as a Major Heritage Building of Wallonia.

Between April 2014 and September 2019, the synagogue was closed, during major structural renovations caused by moisture and dry rot that compromised the structure of the building, leading to the collapse of a vault. The building was subsequently repaired with the support of a local Islamic community and other support. The Association des Musulmans d’Arlon raised around €2,400 towards repairs. It's administrator Dr. Mohamed Bouezmarni stated 'Everything is a matter of priority. It’s true, we haven’t got a mosque but it is more urgent to help the synagogue that falls apart'.

== See also ==
- The Holocaust in Belgium
- History of the Jews in Belgium
- List of protected heritage sites in Arlon
