= Jean-Baptiste Masui =

Belgian civil engineer (1798–1860)

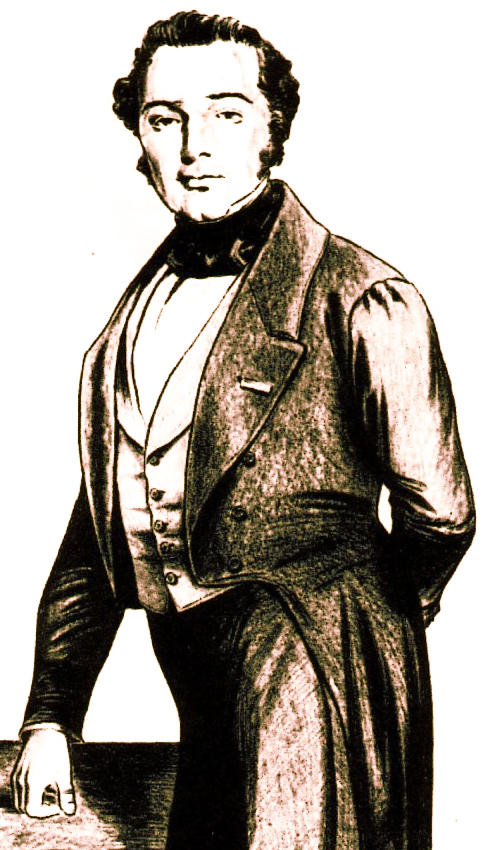
Portrait engraved circa 1850

Jean-Baptiste Masui (1798–1860) was a civil engineer who became Director General of Railways, Posts and Telegraphs in Belgium.

== Life ==
Masui was born in Brussels, which at the time was annexed to the First French Republic, on 17 January 1798. His parents were the joiner Michel-Joseph Masui and his wife Marie-Catherine Schoy. After studying at the French Imperial School of Manufactures, the young Masui was appointed engineer to the city of Brussels. His first responsibility was to oversee improvements to the navigability of the Willebroek Canal, after which he was appointed director of works on the canal.

On 29 October 1830, in the wake of the Belgian Revolution, the Provisional Government of Belgium appointed Masui engineer second-class of roads and bridges. In this capacity he worked on completing the Brussels–Charleroi Canal. He also worked on the dikes of the River Scheldt and on the canalisation of the Nete. On 22 November 1834 he became engineer first class, and on 10 June 1835 Barthélémy de Theux de Meylandt appointed him director of the polders on both sides of the Scheldt. On 14 December 1835 Masui was appointed to the administration of the Antwerp Maritime Academy. During a royal inspection of the polders, the king was impressed by how well those under Masui's direction worked together, and on 25 December 1837 he awarded him a knighthood in the Order of Leopold.

When Belgium's Ministry of Public Works was established on 13 January 1837, with Jean-Baptiste Nothomb as minister, Masui was the same day appointed secretary-general of the ministry. In September 1838 Masui became Director of the Administration of Railways, established three years after the first Belgian railway line had been opened. He oversaw the opening of the railway line from Ghent to Kortrijk on 22 September 1839, Landen to Sint-Truiden on 6 October 1839, Brussels to Tubize on 18 May 1840, Tubize to Soignies 31 October 1841, Soignies to Mons on 19 December 1841, and an inclined elevator at Ans (designed by Henri Maus) on 1 May 1842.

On 27 January 1850, Masui was appointed Director General of Railways and Posts. He became the honorary president of the Vrais Amis du Devoir Mutuel, a friendly society established in 1851 for employees of the ministry of public works. His final years were overshadowed by the premature loss of his wife and daughter. He died in Brussels on 11 December 1860. Thousands attended his funeral at the Church of Our Lady of Finisterrae in Brussels.

== Honours and awards ==
Masui was a commander in the Order of Leopold I.

A white marble statue of Masui, carved by Charles-Auguste Fraikin and paid for by voluntary subscription, was unveiled at Brussels-North railway station on 1 May 1867.

A road, a square and a tram stop in Schaarbeek are named in memory of Masui.
