= Ferdinand de Meeûs =

Belgian banker, businessman and politician

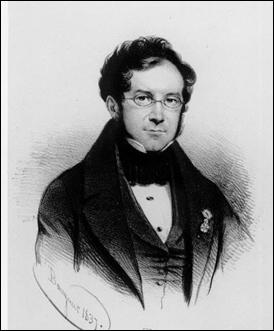
Portrait of Ferdinand de Meeûs

Ferdinand de Meeûs (1798–1861) was a Belgian banker, businessman and politician. He founded the Society for the Enlargement and Embellishment of Belgium in 1838, which attempted to promote Brussels as a capital.
