= Arthur van Gehuchten =

Belgian anatomist

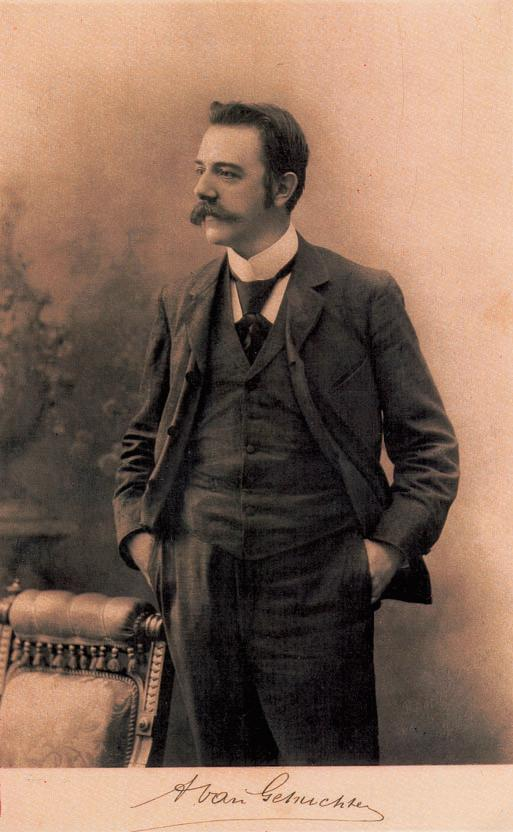
Arthur Van Gehuchten.

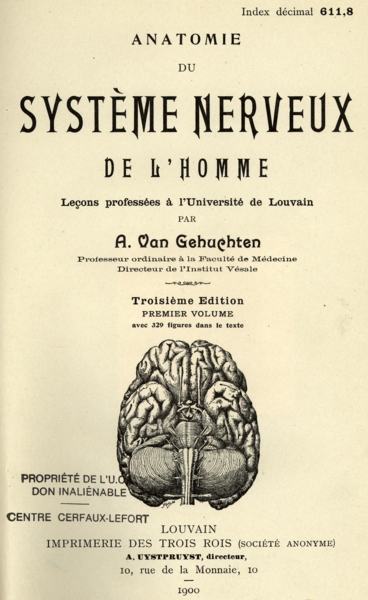
Title page of Anatomie du Système Nerveux de l'homme (1900)

Arthur van (or Van) Gehuchten (20 April 1861 – 9 December 1914) was a Belgian anatomist, born in Antwerp. He was professor in the faculty of medicine at the University of Leuven until the start of World War I in 1914. He moved to England and taught biology at Cambridge University until his death. Van Gehuchten is especially known for his contributions to the theory of neurons. In anatomy, the van Gehuchten method is the fixing of a histologic tissue in a mixture of glacial acetic acid 10 parts, chloroform 30 parts, and alcohol 60 parts.

== Writings ==
- L'Anatomie du système nerveux de l'homme (1893)
- Contribution à l'étude du faisceau pyramidal (1896)
- Structure du télencéphale: centres de projection et centres d'association. Polleunis & Ceuterick, 1897
- Cours d'anatomie humain systématique (I-III, 1906–09)
- Les centres nerveaux cérébro-spinaux (1908)
- Het zenuwgestel. Nederl. Boekh, 1908
- La radicotomie postérieure dans les affections nerveuses spasmodiques (1911)
- Coup de couteau dans la moelle lombaire. Essai de physiologie pathologique. Le Névraxe 9, ss. 208–232 (1907)
- Le mouvement pendulaire ou réflexe pendulaire de la jambe. Contribution à l'étude des réflexes tendineux. Le Névraxe 10, ss. 263–266 (1908)
- Over myopatische ziekten. Voordracht met kinematographische lichtbeelden. Handelingen van het XIVe Vlaams Natuur-en Geneeskundig Congres 1–8 (1910)
- La radicotomie postérieure dans les affections nerveuses spasmodiques (modification de l'opération de Foerster). Bulletin de l'Académie royale de Médecine de Belgique ss. 1–43 (1910)
- Het doorsnijden der achterste ruggemergwortels als behandeling van zekere vormen van spastische paraplegie, (met kinematographische lichbeelden). Handelingen van het XVIe Vlaamsch Natuur- en Geneeskundig Congres 422–43 (1913)

== Neurone ==
Van Gehuchten adopted Waldeyer's coinage for the nerve cell, but spelt this in French as 'le neurone' rather than 'le neuron'. It is believed that the reason for adding the 'e' at the end of the word relates to the interplay between linguistics and phonetics: the final 'n' in 'neuron' would have been 'sounded' in the classical Greek, and also in Waldeyer's German coinage, and, to do the same in French, there needed to be an 'e' placed at the end of the word. Without this, 'neuron' would have rhymed with 'maison' and the link with the original Greek would have been lost.

== Bibliography ==
- Aubert G. Arthur van Gehuchten takes neurology to the movies. "Neurology". 59. 10, pp. 1612–8, 2002. PMID 12451206.
- Aubert G. Arthur van Gehuchten (1861–1914). "J Neurol". 248 (5), pp. 439–40, 2001. PMID 11437175.
- James W. Papez. Arthur Van Gehuchten (1861–1914) in: Webb Haymaker (ed.): The Founders of Neurology. One Hundred and Thirty-Three Biographical Sketches. Prepared for the Fourth International Neurological Congress in Paris by Eighty-Four Authors. Springfield: C.C.Thomas, 1953, pp. 38–41
