= Heva Coomans =

Belgian-French-American painter (1860–1939)

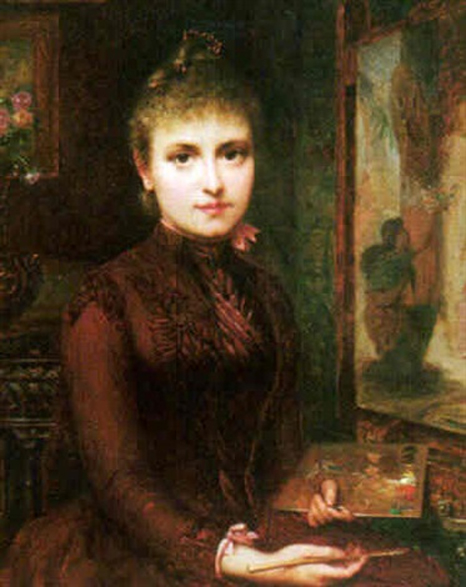
- Self-portrait, 1888
- Born: 2 May 1860; Paris, France
- Died: 14 July 1939 (aged 79); New York City

Heva Coomans (1860–1939) was a Belgian painter.

Coomans was born in Paris as the daughter of the painter Pierre Olivier Joseph Coomans (1816–1889) and Adélaïde Lacroix (1838–1884). Her sister Diana Coomans was also a painter and her brother Oscar Coomans (1848–1884) was a poet. Like her father and sister, she painted romantic portrayals of the original inhabitants of Pompei before the eruption of Vesuvius, but also is known for depicting young women in other mythological or heroic scenes.

Coomans died in New York City.
