= Joseph Amerlinck =

Belgian railway engineer

Joseph Amerlinck (1862–1915) was a Belgian railway engineer active in Central Africa and South America.

== Life ==
Amerlinck was born in Ghent on 22 May 1862. After graduating from the School of Civil Engineering of Ghent University, in 1888 he set off for the Congo Free State, to assess the feasibility of building a railway line from Lukungu to Leopoldville. He later worked in Chile, where he briefly taught at the University of Santiago, and for about a decade in Guatemala, as director of a railway. Around 1905 he moved to Mexico, where his descendants became the family Amerlinck y Zirión. He died on 5 February 1915.
