= Germain Morin =

Franco-Belgian Benedictine historical scholar, patrologist and liturgiologist

Germain Morin (1861–1946) was a Franco-Belgian Benedictine historical scholar, patrologist, and liturgiologist, of the Beuronese Congregation.

== Life ==
Born at Caen in Normandy, he entered the Abbey of St. Benedict at Maredsous, Belgium, in 1882 and was ordained to the priesthood in 1886. From 1884 he worked on the Revue bénédictine. After a disastrous year as prefect of the college at Maredsous he devoted himself primarily to scholarly research, ranging widely across European libraries and archives. Maredsous remained his scholarly base until 1907 when he moved to the Abbey of St. Boniface in Munich. He spent the years 1914-18 in Switzerland; his support of Germany in World War I brought him lasting unpopularity in Belgium. He returned to Switzerland in 1939, spending his last years at Fribourg. He is buried at Einsiedeln.

During his research in various European libraries, which he undertook from 1887, M. found unedited sermons and texts by Caesarius of Arles, Jerome and Augustine, among others. In 1912 he was exclaustrated by Pius X in order to be able to do better research. Morin's lifelong project was a new edition of the sermons of Caesarius of Arles. He also published important editions of various works of Jerome, of sermons of Augustine discovered subsequent to the edition of the Maurists, and of many other works, often in the series Anecdota Maredsolana. He was awarded honorary degrees by the universities of Oxford (1905), Budapest (1915), Zurich (1919), and Freiburg im Breisgau (1926).

== Major publications ==
Morin wrote numerous scientific articles in patristics, liturgy, hagiography, archaeology, church and order history.

- L'idéal monastique et la vie chrétienne des premiers jours (Paris: Beauchesne, 1912; Eng. tr. by C. Gunning, The Ideal of the Monastic Life Found in the Apostolic Age, New York: Benzinger Bros., 1914).
- Études, Textes, Découvertes: Contributions a la Littérature et a L'histoire des Douze Premiers Siècles (Maredsous: Maredsous Abbey, 1913).
- (ed.) Sancti Augustini Sermones post Maurinos reperti, Miscellanea Agostiniana vol. 1 (Rome, Typis Polyglottis Vaticanis, 1930).
- (ed.) Sancti Caesarii Arelatensis Sermones, 2 vols., Corpus Christianorum Series Latina 103-104 (Turnhout: Brepols, 1937-1942).
