= Diana Coomans =

Belgian painter (1861–1952)

- Born: 16 August 1861; Paris
- Died: 18 June 1952 (aged 90); New York City

Diana Coomans (16 August 1861 – 18 June 1952) was a Belgian painter.

Coomans was born in Paris as the daughter of the painter Pierre Olivier Joseph Coomans (1816–1889) and Adélaïde Lacroix (1838–1884). Her sister Heva Coomans and her brother Oscar-Jean Coomans (1848–1884) were also painters. Like her father and sister, she specialized in romantic portrayals of the original inhabitants of Pompei before the eruption of Vesuvius devastated life there. Her 1885 work In the Gynaeceum was included in the book Women Painters of the World.

Coomans died in New York City.
