= Anglo-Belgian Treaty of Commerce and Navigation =

1862 free trade agreement between the United Kingdom and Belgium

The Anglo-Belgian Treaty of Commerce and Navigation was a free trade agreement between the United Kingdom of Great Britain and Ireland and the Kingdom of Belgium, signed on 23 July 1862.

It was the first such treaty that rather than being time-limited and requiring renewal, contained an open-ended stipulation for withdrawal (technically known as "denunciation") that became a regular feature of later treaties of commerce (article 25):

The present Treaty shall continue in force for ten years dating from the tenth day after the exchange of the Ratifications. In case neither of the two Contracting Parties should have notified, twelve months before the end of the said period, its intention to terminate the Treaty, it shall remain in force until the expiration of a year dating from the day on which either of the High Contracting Parties shall have given notice for its termination.

Prime Minister Salisbury gave notification of the United Kingdom's intention to withdraw from the treaty on 28 July 1897, because a clause providing that Belgian goods be admitted to British colonies on the same footing as British goods was contrary to the new policy of Imperial Preference. This British "denunciation" was published in the Moniteur Belge of 1 August 1897.

== See also ==
- Cobden–Chevalier Treaty
- Free trade agreements of the United Kingdom
