= Pieter Vanderghinste =

Belgian composer

Peter or Pieter Vanderghinste or Van der Ghinste (Kortrijk, 20 November 1789 - Kortrijk, 22 October 1860) was a Flemish composer who worked in United Kingdom of the Netherlands.

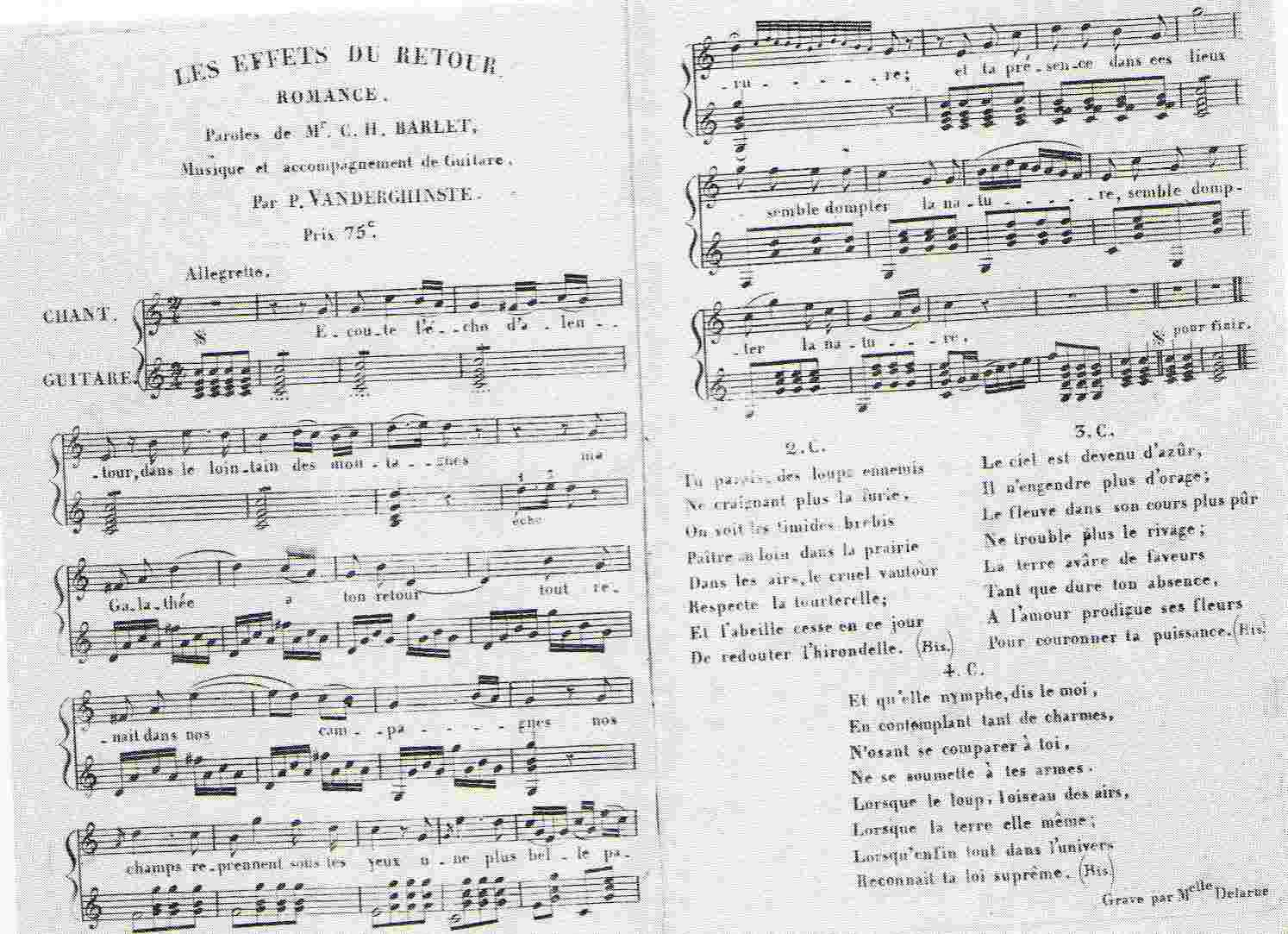
The romance Les effets du retour, text by C. Barlet, music by Pieter Vanderghinste, for voice and guitar.

Pieter Vanderghinste composed both religious and worldly music, such as motets and romances. He also composed a Dutch language opera titled Het Pruisisch soldatenkwartier, which uses a libretto by the rederijker J.B. Hofman. The première took place in Kortrijk in 1816. The sheet music of this opera was only partly recovered.

Inspired by a travelling German company, Vanderghinste founded a choir company in 1817 in Kortrijk. This is the first choir of its kind that we know of in Flanders.

The father of the famous Flemish composer Peter Benoit used to play music by Vanderghinste, next to big international names, in the orchestra of Harelbeke, in which he played the violin. Peter Benoit is thought to have had some contacts with the composer between 1847 and 1851, while he was studying with the pianist-organist Pieter Carlier, who lived in Desselgem.
