= Auguste t'Kint =

Belgian diplomat

Auguste Pierre Joseph t'Kint de Roodenbeke (1816 – 1878) was a Belgian diplomat who initiated his country's treaty relations with several countries in Central America and East Asia.

It has not yet been fully established when and where Auguste t’Kint was born. According to one source, he was born in Brussels on 12 December 1816 to a family which claimed descent from the t'Kint de Roodenbekes, one of the Seven Noble Houses of Brussels. However, another source mentions that Auguste t’Kint was born in Antwerp on 22 November 1816, as son of Pierre-Joseph t’Kint, a broker at the stock exchange of Antwerp, and Anne Waumans. From 1832 to 1840, Auguste t’Kint worked for several trading companies in Antwerp and Brussels.

His civil service career began in 1840 in the commercial section of the ministry of the interior. In 1841 he was assigned to the project to establish a Belgian colony at Santo Tomás de Castilla in Guatemala. He was responsible for liaising between the Compagnie belge de Colonisation and the Guatemalan government. When the project was abandoned in 1855, he was appointed consul general to Guatemala and Belgian plenipotentiary to all the republics of Central America, with a brief to tie up loose ends left by the failure of Belgian colonisation in Santo Tomás, to put the relationships between the two governments on a sounder footing, and to extend Belgian diplomatic relations to other Central American countries.

Between 1855 and 1859 t'Kint negotiated Belgium's first treaties of amity and commerce with Guatemala, Honduras, Nicaragua, Costa Rica and El Salvador. In 1859 his Rapport sur le commerce de la Belgique avec l'Amérique centrale was published in Brussels, and his achievements in Central America were rewarded with the knight's cross of the Order of Leopold. In December 1859 he was appointed Belgian consul general, chargé d'affaires and plenipotentiary to Mexico, signing a treaty of amity, commerce and navigation on 20 July 1861.

He returned to Belgium in 1862, and in 1864 was appointed Belgian consul general to China. The first treaty of amity, commerce and navigation between China and Belgium was signed in Beijing on 2 November 1865, and in December t'Kint arrived in Yokohama as the first Belgian diplomat in Japan, where he concluded a treaty of amity, commerce and navigation that was signed in Edo on 1 August the following year. In December 1868 he was appointed Leopold II of Belgium's extraordinary envoy and minister plenipotentiary to both China and Japan.

He returned to Europe in ill health in 1872 and retired in 1875. He died 20 March 1878 as a commander in the Order of Leopold.
