= Louis Galesloot =

Belgian archivist, historian and archaeologist

Louis Galesloot (1821–1884) was a Belgian archivist, historian and archaeologist.

== Life ==
Galesloot was born in Molenbeek-Saint-Jean on 18 December 1821, one of the eight children of Eugène Galesloot and his wife. His first job was with the civil registry of the city of Brussels, and in 1847 he started working for the Royal Commission for the Publication of Old Laws. On 21 March 1859 he was appointed head of the third section of the National Archives of Belgium. He remained in this position until his death, inventorising many of the holdings of judicial and administrative institutions of the pre-1800 Duchy of Brabant. In 1862–1863 he published the records of the trial of Frans Anneessens in two volumes. Galesloot died on 23 July 1884.

== Publications ==
- Recherches historiques sur la maison de chasse des ducs de Brabant et de l'ancienne cour de Bruxelles, précédées d'un aperçu sur l'ancien droit de chasse en Brabant (Brussels, 1854)
- La province de Brabant sous l'empire romain. Aperçu historique, archéologique et physique (Brussels, 1859)
- Inventaire du Notariat général de Brabant, et des protocoles qui y ont été réunis (1862)
- Procès de François Anneessens, doyen du corps des métiers de Bruxelles, 2 vols. (Brussels, 1862-1863)
- "L'Assassinat de Charles-Alexandre duc de Croy, le 9 novembre 1624, à Bruxelles", Revue trimestrielle, 39:3 (1863), pp. 69-103.
- Pierre-Albert et Jean de Launay, Hérauts d'Armes du Duché de Brabant, Histoire de leurs procès, 1643-1687 (Brussels, 1866)
- "Le procès d'une sorcière au village de Casterlé, 1565-1571", Messager des sciences historiques (Ghent, 1869), pp. 342–392.
- Chronique des évènements les plus remarquables arrivés à Bruxelles de 1780 à 1827 (1870)
- Inventaire des archives de la cour féodale de Brabant, vol. 1 (1870)
- Vestiges d'un oppidum nervien près de Vilvorde (1871)
- La province de Brabant avant l'invasion des Romains. Etudes archéologiques et topographiques (Brussels, 1871)
