= Edouard Terwecoren =

Belgian author

Edouard Terwecoren (1815–1872) was a Belgian Jesuit author.

== Life ==
Terwecoren was born in Vilvoorde on 17 June 1815. He entered the Jesuit novitiate in Nivelles in 1836. He taught at the Jesuit college in Namur and St Joseph College, Aalst, before becoming prefect of studies at St Michael College, Brussels.

In 1852 he was the founding editor of the review Collection de précis historiques, which published edifying and educational material such as Pierre-Jean De Smet's letters from the American mission. He continued as editor until his death in Brussels on 1 June 1872.

== Works ==
- Les Beaux-Arts considérés dans leurs rapports avec l'éducation de la jeunesse (1842)
- Manuel de dévotion à saint Antoine de Padoue (1851)
- Notre-Dame de Consolation à Vilvorde (1852)
- Le mois de ma Mère ou le nouveau mois de Marie (1860)
- Neuvaine préparatoire à la fête de saint Pierre (1862)
