= Charles Rogier =

Belgian journalist, statesman

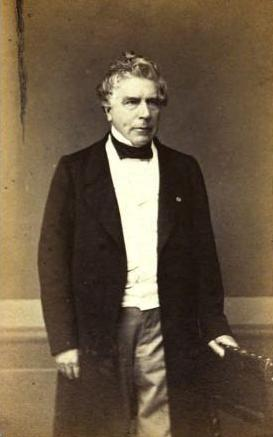

Prime Minister of Belgium

Chairman of the Provisional Government of Belgium
- In office 27 September 1830 – 25 February 1831
- Preceded by: Office established
- Succeeded by: Office dissolved
- In office 12 August 1847 – 31 October 1852
- Monarch: Leopold I
- Preceded by: Barthélémy de Theux de Meylandt
- Succeeded by: Henri de Brouckère
- In office 9 November 1857 – 3 January 1868
- Monarchs: Leopold I Leopold II
- Preceded by: Pierre de Decker
- Succeeded by: Walthère Frère-Orban

President of the Chamber of Representatives
- In office 1 August 1878 – 13 November 1878
- Preceded by: Xavier Victor Thibaut
- Succeeded by: Jules Guillery

Personal details
- Born: 17 August 1800 Saint-Quentin, France
- Died: 27 May 1885 (aged 84) Saint-Josse-ten-Noode, Belgium
- Party: Liberal Party
- Education: University of Liège

Charles Latour Rogier (French pronunciation: [ʃaʁl latuʁ ʁɔʒje]; 17 August 1800 – 27 May 1885) was a Belgian liberal statesman and a leader in the Belgian Revolution of 1830. He served as the prime minister of Belgium on two occasions: from 1847 to 1852, and again from 1857 to 1868.

== Career ==
=== Early life ===
Rogier was descended from a family settled in the department of the Nord in France, and was born in Saint-Quentin. His father, an officer in the French army, perished in the Russian Campaign of 1812. The family then moved to the Belgian city of Liège, where the eldest son, Firmin, held a professorship. Rogier studied law at the University of Liège and was admitted to the Bar. However, he devoted himself with greater zeal to journalistic campaigns against the Dutch rule in Belgium, which had been established by the Congress of Vienna in 1815. In 1824, in collaboration with his lifelong friends Paul Devaux and Joseph Lebeau, he founded the journal Mathieu Laensberg (afterwards Le Politique). With its ardent patriotism and its attacks on the Dutch administration, the journal soon achieved widespread influence.

On the outbreak of the insurrection at Brussels in August 1830, Rogier went there with a militia of about 300 citizens from Liège. In Brussels, he gained recognition as one of the most active among the patriot leaders, and his influence saved the town hall from pillage on 19 September. Five days later a commission administrative was formed, of which Rogier became president. The measures of this body and of its successor, the gouvernement provisoire, soon freed the greater part of the country from the Dutch troops. In October Rogier was also sent to suppress an outbreak among the colliers of Hainaut Province.

=== Political rise ===
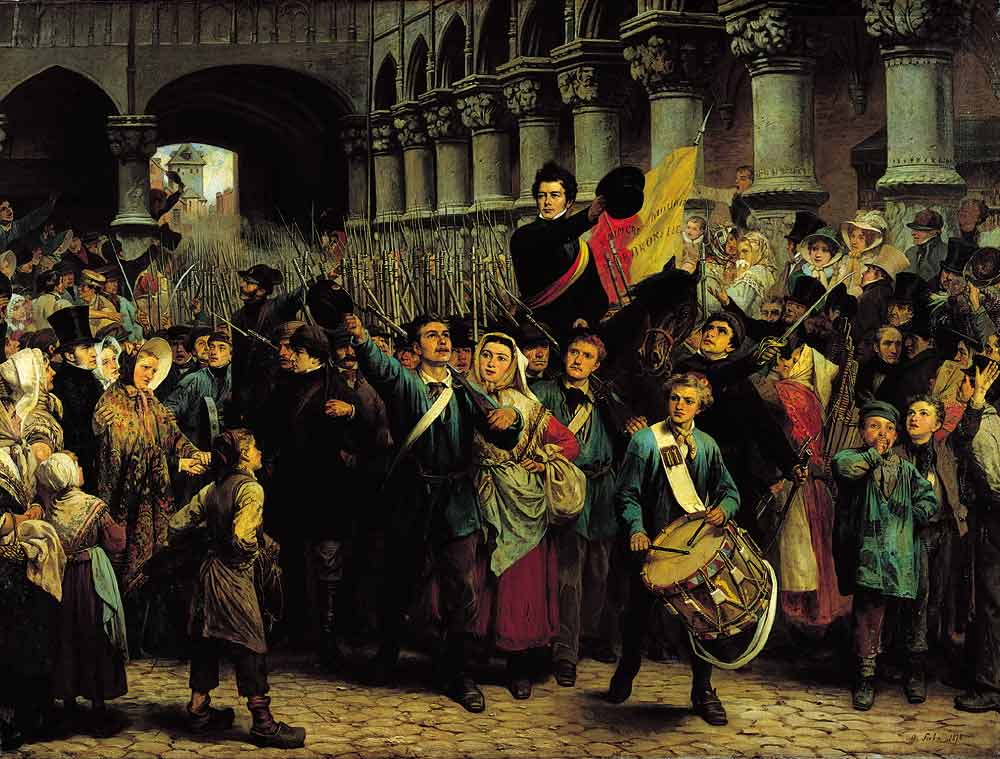
Rogier à la tête des volontaires de Liège - Rogier at the head of the Liège volunteers (Charles Soubre, 1878)

Rogier became a member of the provisional government established in October of the same year. He succeeded in arranging an armistice, and then reorganized the entire administration of Antwerp. He represented Liège in the Belgian National Congress, voted for the establishment of a hereditary monarchy, and induced the congress to adopt the principle of an elective second chamber. In the long-drawn debates on the bestowal of the crown he ranged himself on the side of Louis Philippe: he first supported the candidature of prince Otto of Bavaria, and on his rejection declared for Louis Philippe's son duc de Nemours, whose candidacy was declined by Louis.

After the eventual election of Leopold I as King in June 1831, Rogier was made Governor of Antwerp, a post rendered difficult by the continued presence of Dutch troops in the citadel. In October 1832 he was made minister of the interior in the Goblet cabinet. In June 1833 he intervened in a quarrel in the chamber of deputies between Paul Devaux, then a minister, and the opposition leader, Alexandre Gendebien, and fought a duel in which he was severely wounded. During his term of office, he carried, in the teeth of violent opposition, a law that established in Belgium the first railways on the continent of Europe, and thus laid the foundation of her industrial development. Owing to dissension in the cabinet, he retired in 1834, together with Lebeau, and resumed the governorship of Antwerp.

When Lebeau returned to power in 1840, Rogier became Minister of Public Works and Education. His educational reform proposals were defeated, and when the ministry resigned in 1841 he supported a compromise that passed into law the next year. He then led the Liberal party in Opposition until 1847, when he formed a cabinet in which he was Minister of the Interior. He at once embarked on a programme of political and economic reform, and took effective steps to remedy the industrial distress caused by the decay of the Flemish linen trade. The limits of the franchise were extended, and as the result of the liberal policy of the government Belgium alone escaped the revolutionary wave that spread over the Continent in 1848. He passed a law in 1850 organizing secondary education under the control of the State, and giving the clergy only the right of religious instruction. The opposition Clerical party, though unable to defeat this measure, succeeded in shaking the position of the cabinet; and it was finally undermined, after Louis Napoleon's coup d'état of 1851, by the hostility of the French government, whose political exiles had been welcomed by the liberal cabinet at Brussels.

Rogier retired in October 1852, but was brought back into office by the liberal reaction of 1857. He again became president of the council and minister of the interior in a cabinet of which Walthère Frère-Orban was the most conspicuous member. The first important measure passed by the ministry was one for the fortification of Antwerp. In 1860 the fear of French designs on the independence of Belgium led to a movement of reconciliation with the Netherlands, and in the same year, Belgium adopted La Brabançonne as its national anthem, with words adapted by Rogier from an existing poem.

From 1861, Rogier served as Minister for Foreign Affairs. In this capacity he achieved a diplomatic triumph in freeing the navigation of the river Scheldt, thus enabling Antwerp to become the second port on the mainland of Europe. Electorally defeated at Dinant, he represented Tournai from 1863, a post he held until his death.

=== Later life ===
By now his younger colleague, Frère-Orban, gradually overshadowed his chief, and in 1868 Rogier finally retired from power. He continued, however, to take part in public life, and was elected president of the extraordinary session of the chamber of representatives in 1878, but was replaced by Jules Guillery later the same year. The fiftieth anniversary of the kingdom of Belgium in 1880, and two years later that of his entry into parliament, were the occasion of demonstrations in his honour. He died in Brussels on 27 May 1885, and his remains were accorded a public funeral.

== Legacy ==
Today, one of Brussels' central squares, the Charles Rogier Square, is named in his honour, as is the nearby Rogier metro station.

A 1897 statue of Rogier by Guillaume de Groot stands at the center of the Freedom Square, another prominent space in central Brussels.

== Honours ==
- Belgium:
  - Minister of State, By Royal decree.
  - Iron Cross.
  - Grand Cordon in the Order of Leopold.
- Austrian Empire: Grand Cross in the Austrian Imperial Order of Leopold
- France: Knight Grand Cross in the Legion of Honour.
- Kingdom of Italy: Knight Grand Cross in the Order of Saints Maurice and Lazarus.
- Netherlands: Knight Grand Cross in the Order of the Netherlands Lion.
- Kingdom of Portugal: Grand Cross in the Order of the Immaculate Conception of Vila Viçosa.
- Russian Empire: Knight Grand Cross in the Imperial Order of the White Eagle.
- Spain: Knight Grand Cross in the Order of Charles III.
- Sweden: Grand Cross in the Order of the Polar Star.
- Saxe-Coburg and Gotha: Grand Cross in the Saxe-Ernestine House Order.
- Kingdom of Prussia: Grand Cross in the Order of the Red Eagle.

== Gallery ==
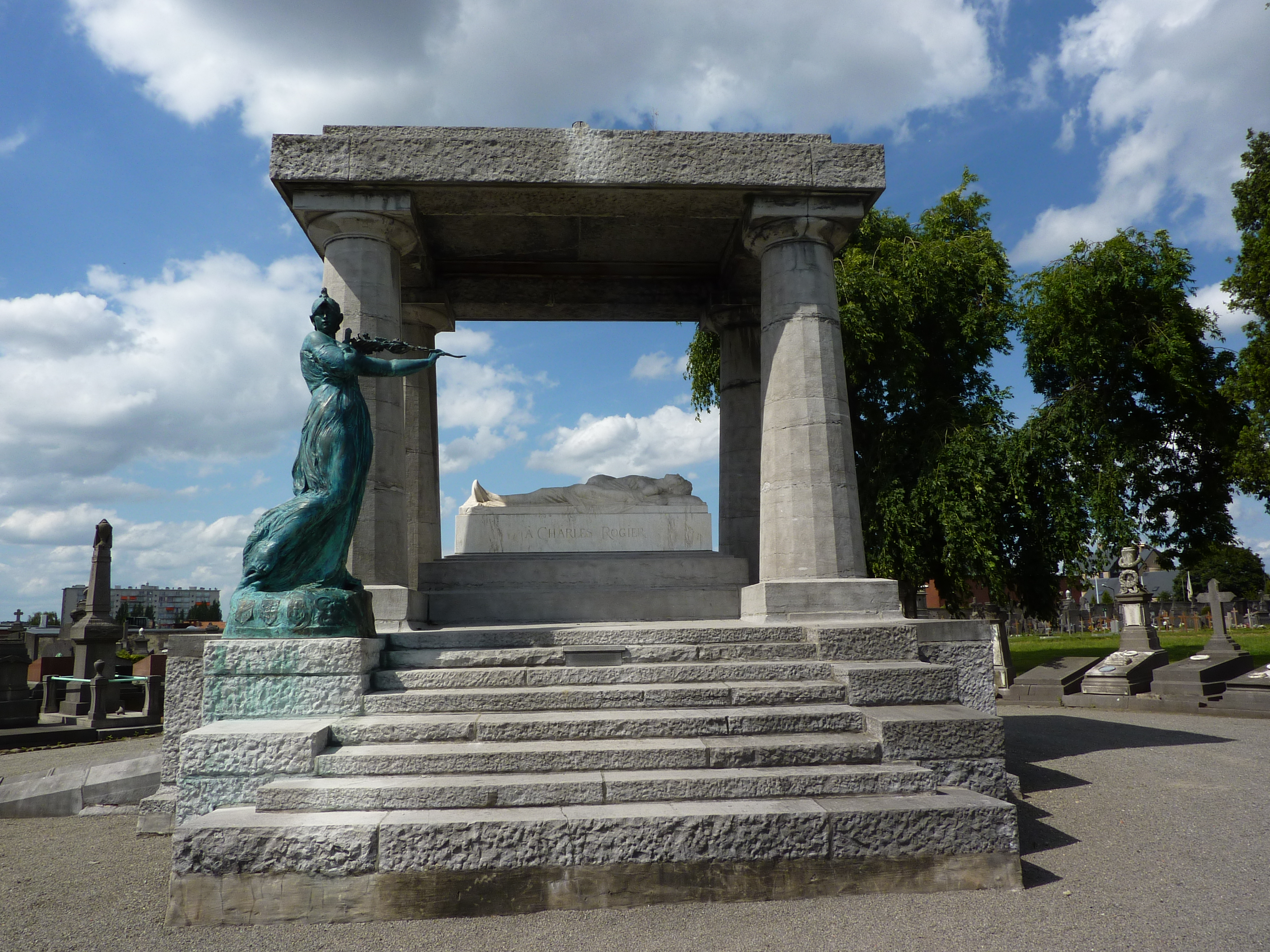
Mausoleum of Charles Rogier in Saint-Josse-ten-Noode Cemetery

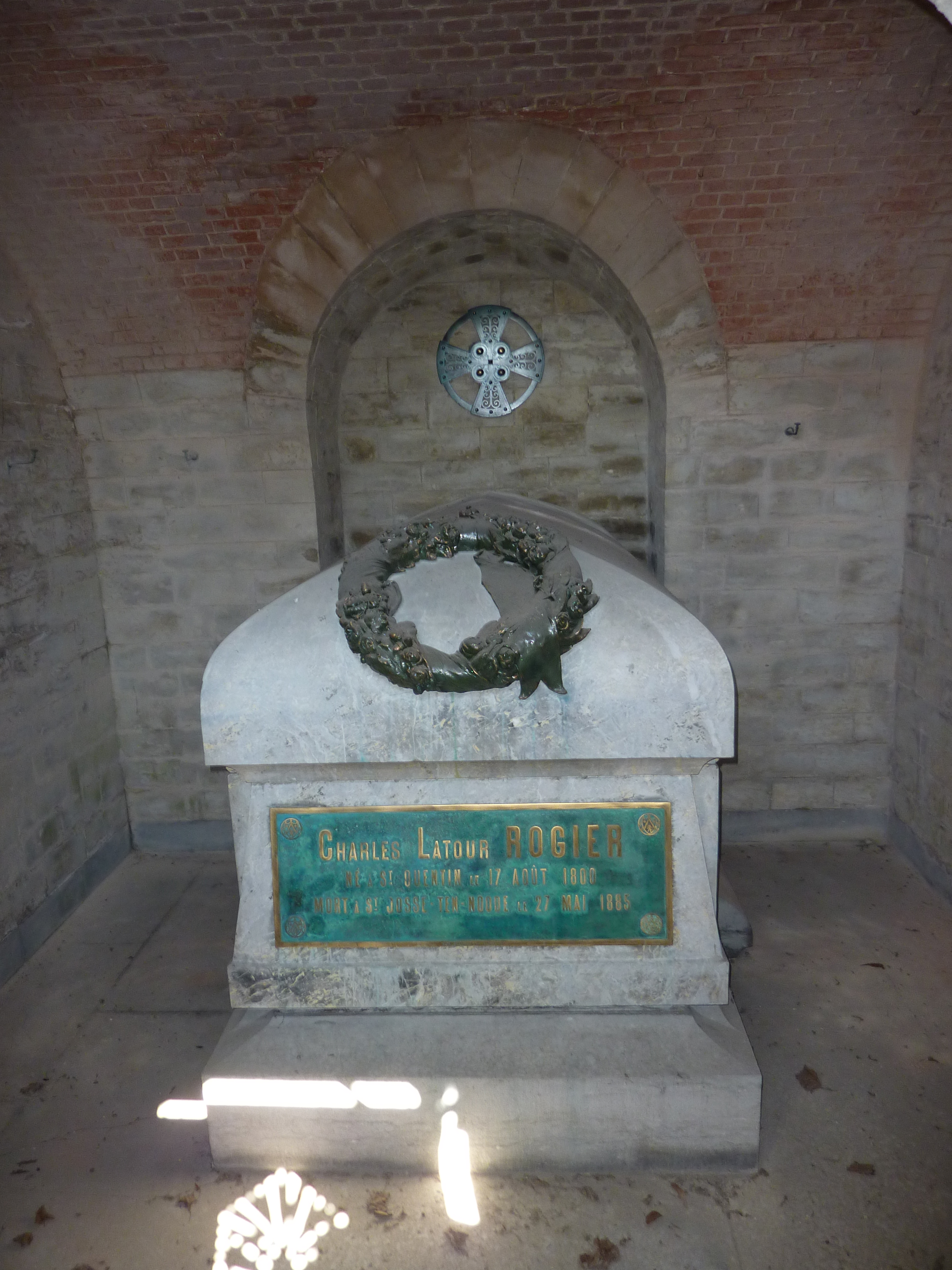
Crypt and grave of Charles Rogier in Saint-Josse-ten-Noode Cemetery

Belgian independence monument in Parc d'Avroy, Liège, dedicated to Charles Rogier

== Publications ==
- Discailles, Ernest (1830). Charles Rogier (1800-1885), d'après des documents inédits (in French). J. Lebègue.

== See also ==
- List of prime ministers of Belgium
- Liberalism in Belgium

Political offices
New office	Prime Minister of Belgium; Acting; 1830–1831	Succeeded by Etienne Constantin de Gerlache
Preceded by Jean-François Tielemans	Governor of Antwerp; 1831–1840	Succeeded by Henri de Brouckère
Preceded by Barthélémy de Theux de Meylandt	Prime Minister of Belgium; 1847–1852	Succeeded by Henri de Brouckère
Preceded by Pierre de Decker	Prime Minister of Belgium; 1857–1868	Succeeded by Walthère Frère-Orban
Preceded by Xavier Victor Thibaut	President of the Chamber of Representatives; 1878	Succeeded by Jules Guillery
