= 1875 in Belgium =

- Decades: 1850s; 1860s; 1870s; 1880s; 1890s
- See also: Other events of 1875; List of years in Belgium

Events in the year 1875 in Belgium.

== Incumbents ==
Monarch: Leopold II
Head of government: Jules Malou

== Events ==
- Delhaize brothers go into retail business.
- 4 February – Princess Louise of Belgium marries Prince Philipp of Saxe-Coburg and Gotha

== Publications ==
Periodicals

- Almanach royal officiel (Brussels, E. Guyot)
- Bulletins de l'Académie royale des sciences, des lettres et des beaux-arts de Belgique (Brussels, M. Hayez).
- Revue de l'horticulture belge et étrangère begins publication

Official publications

- Le Moniteur Belge.

Reference works

- Eugène Van Bemmel, Patria Belgica: Encyclopédie nationale, vol. 3 (Brussels, Bruylant-Christophe & Cie., 1875)

Books

- Hyacinthe De Bruyn, L'art belge au Salon de Bruxelles, 1875.

== Art and architecture ==
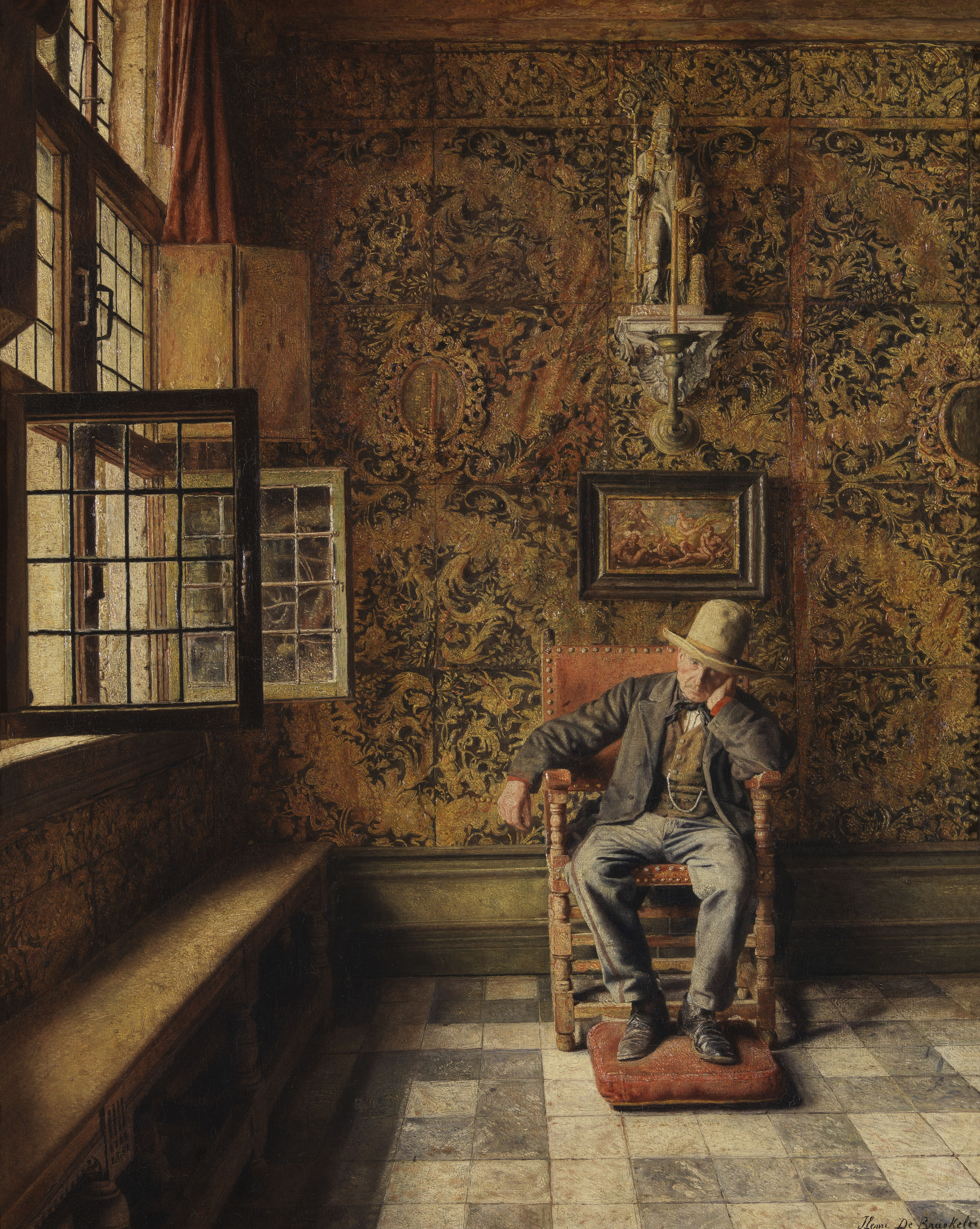
Henri de Braekeleer, The Man in the Chair (1875)

Paintings

- Henri de Braekeleer, The Man in the Chair

== Births ==
- 12 January – Charles de Hemricourt de Grunne (died 1937)
- 22 January – Blanche Rousseau, writer (died 1949)
- 8 March – Maurice Hemelsoet, Olympic rower (died 1943)
- 8 April – Albert I of Belgium (died 1934)
- 29 June – Adrienne Barbanson, aristocrat (died 1944)
- 31 July – Lucie Dejardin, politician (died 1945)
- 21 August – Maurice Lippens, politician (died 1956)
- 22 September – Ferdinand Perier, missionary (died 1968)
- 1 October – Eugeen Van Mieghem, painter (died 1930)
- 11 October – Émile Fairon, archivist (died 1945)
- 12 October – Émile Merlin, astronomer (died 1938)
- 26 November – Princess Marie of Croÿ (died 1968)
- 8 December – Jenny Montigny, painter (died 1937)
- 31 December – Jeanne de Vietinghoff, writer (died 1926)

== Deaths ==
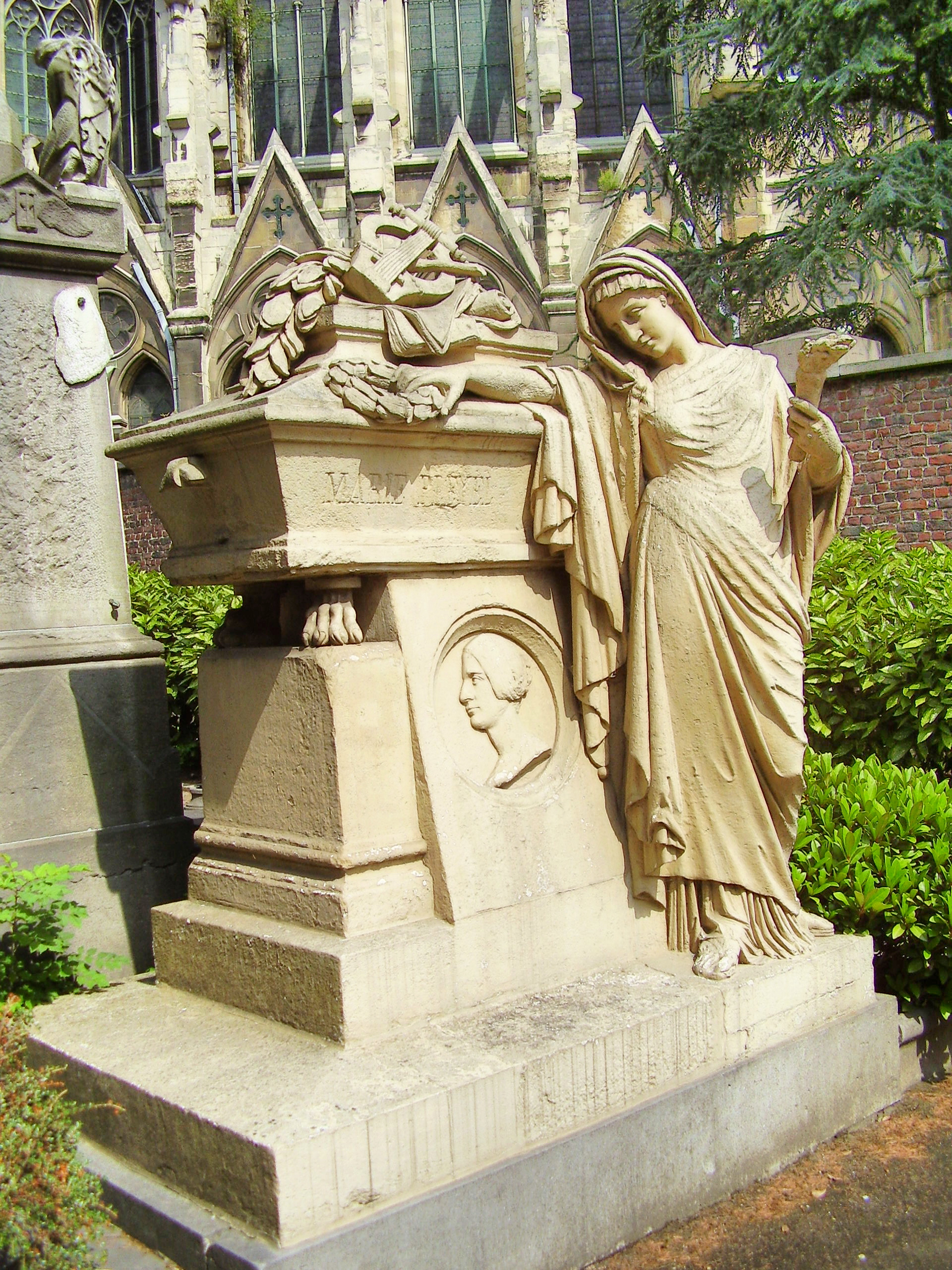
Marie Pleyel's tomb in Laeken Cemetery

- 15 January – Jean Baptiste Julien d'Omalius d'Halloy (born 1783), geologist
- 24 January – Jean-Joseph Raikem (born 1787), politician
- 2 February – Luigi Agnesi (born 1833), singer and composer
- 30 March – Marie Pleyel (born 1811), pianist
- 4 May – Rosalie Loveling (born 1834), author
- 10 May – Michel Van Cuyck (born 1797), artist
- 22 August – Charles Venneman (born 1802), painter
- 11 November – Ernest Louis de Gonzague Vandenpeereboom (born 1807), industrialist and politician
- 12 November – Paul Lauters (born 1806), artist
