= 1871 in Belgium =

- Decades: 1850s; 1860s; 1870s; 1880s; 1890s
- See also: Other events of 1871; List of years in Belgium

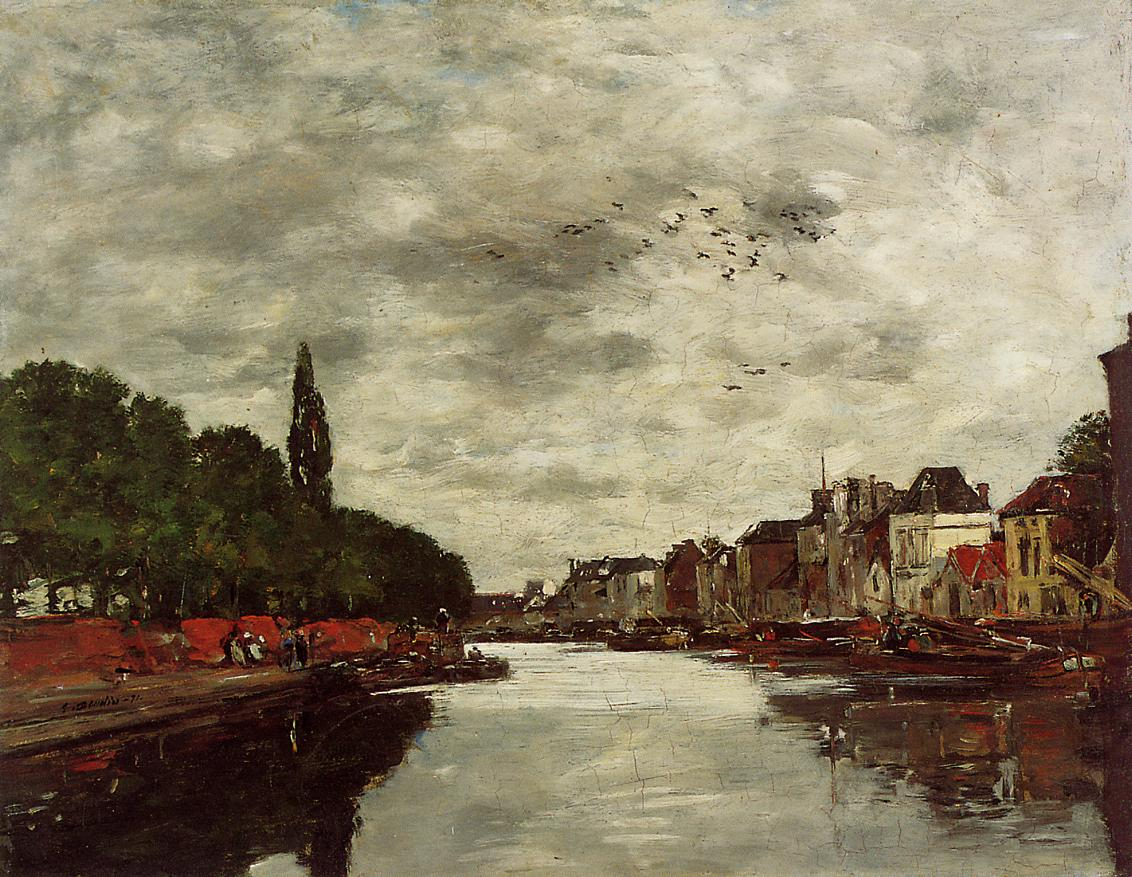
Eugène Boudin, Canal près de Bruxelles (1871)

Events in the year 1871 in Belgium.

== Incumbents ==
Monarch: Leopold II
Head of government: Jules d'Anethan (to 7 December); Barthélémy de Theux de Meylandt (from 7 December)

== Events ==
January

- 1 January – Belgium repeals import duty on salt.

February

- 21 February – Regular railway services between France and Belgium resumed.

March

- 21 March – Victor Hugo moves to Brussels.

June

- 1 June – Victor Hugo expelled from Belgium for endangering the public peace after publishing a letter in L'Indépendance Belge of 26 May criticising the Belgian government's attitude to Communard refugees.

November

- 30 November – Work on Covering of the Senne formally completed.

December

- 7 December – Barthélémy de Theux de Meylandt replaces Jules d'Anethan as Prime Minister.

== Art and architecture ==
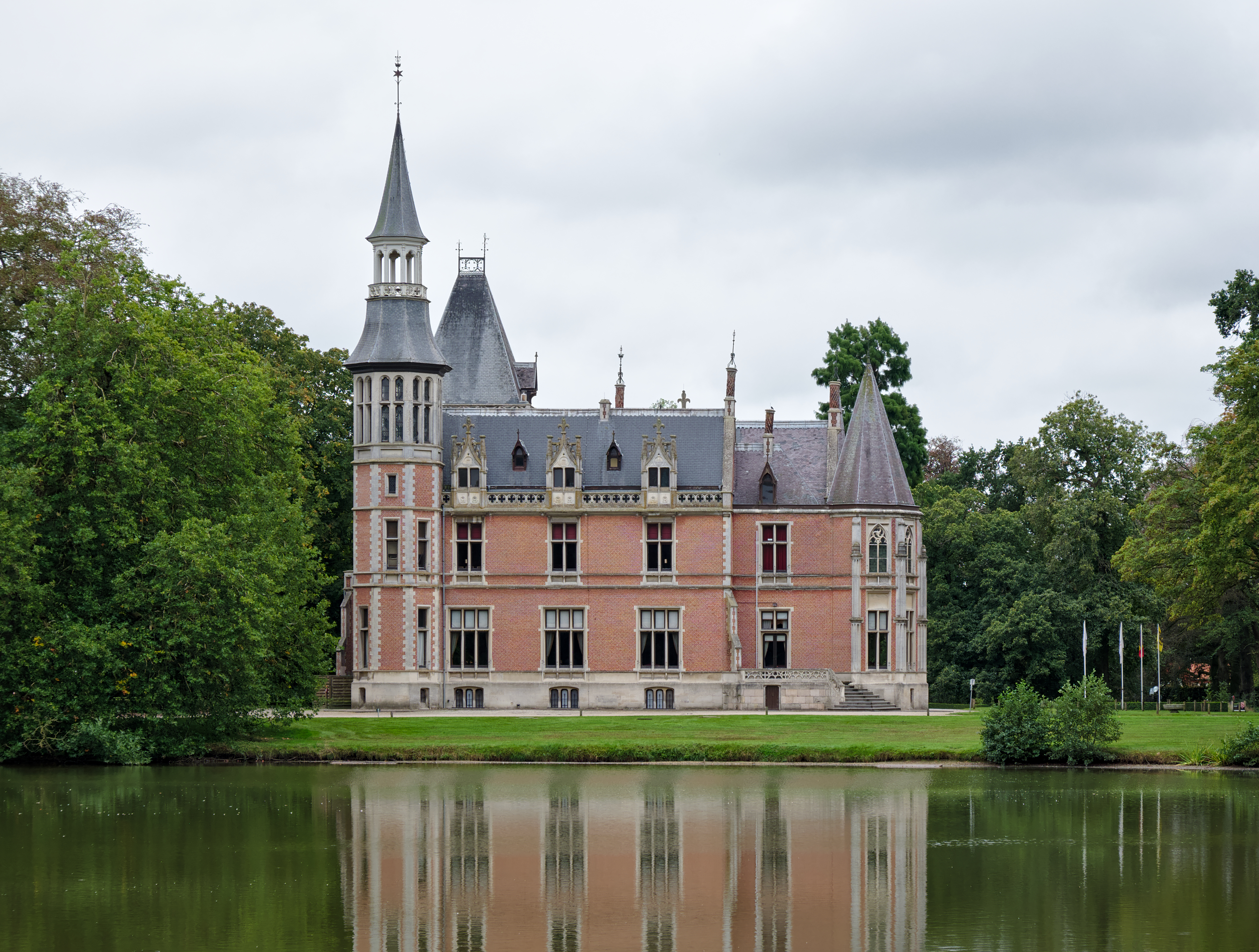
Aertrycke Castle, Torhout

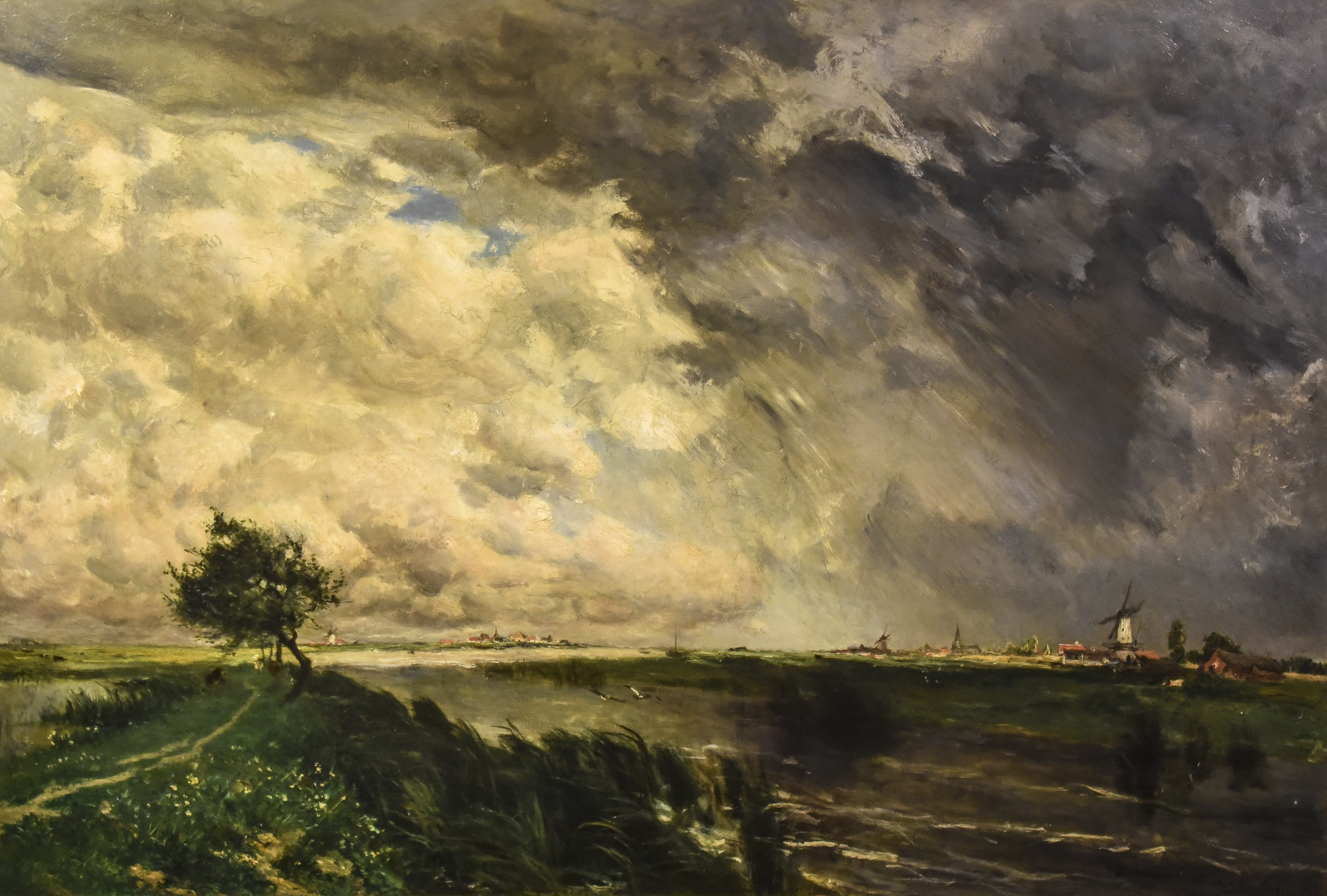
Hippolyte Boulenger, Storm over the Scheldt (1871)

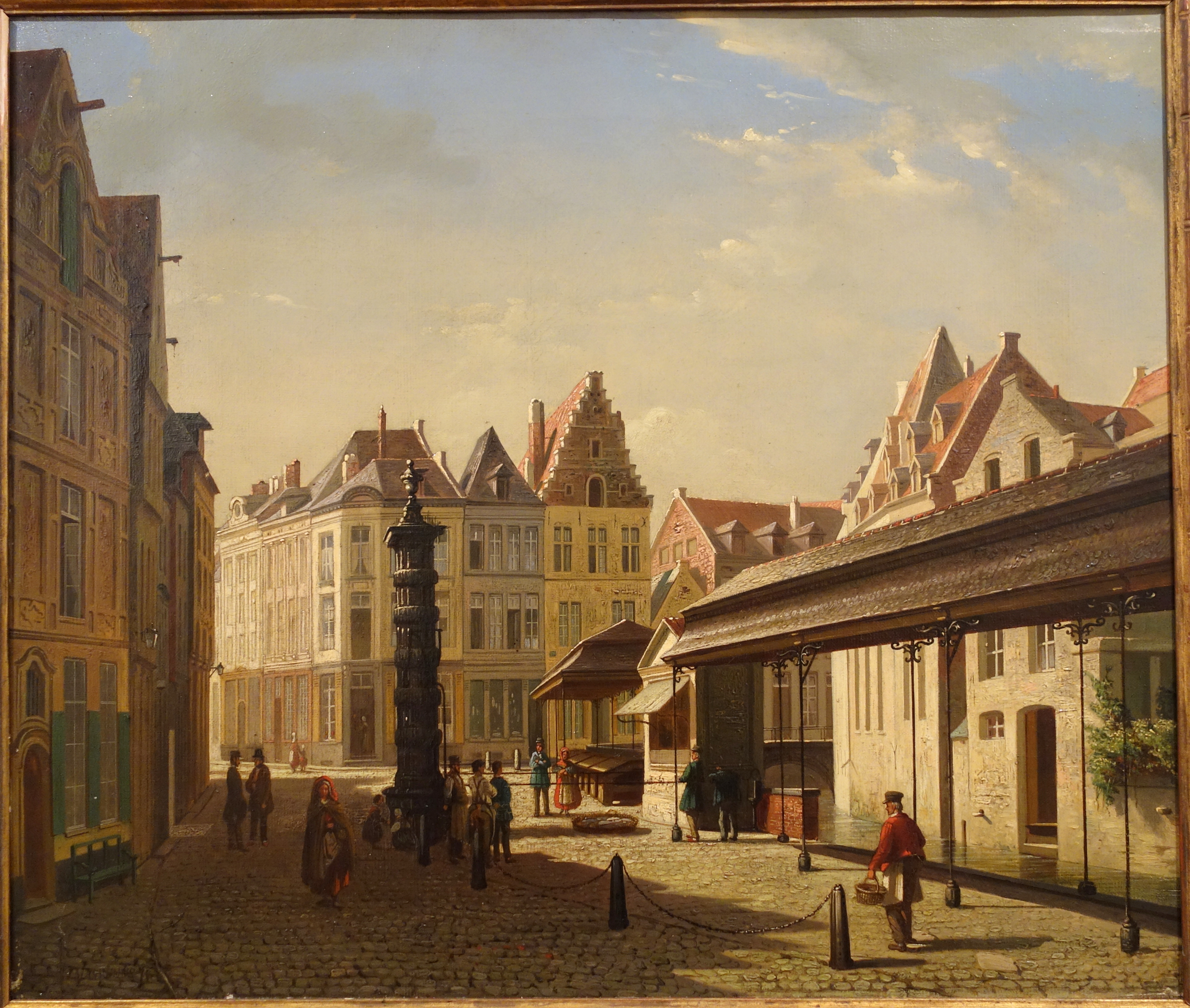
Joseph Maswiens, The Old Fish Market in Leuven (c. 1871)

Buildings

- Aertrycke Castle, Torhout

Paintings

- Hippolyte Boulenger, Storm over the Scheldt
- Joseph Maswiens, The Old Fish Market in Leuven
- Alfred Stevens, The Psyché (My Studio) (c. 1871)

== Publications ==
Serials

- Analectes pour servir à l'histoire ecclésiastique de la Belgique, vol. 8.
- Annales de l'Académie d'archéologie de Belgique, vol. 27.
- Annales du Cercle archéologique de Mons, vol. 10.
- Annuaire de la noblesse de Belgique, vol. 25.
- Archives médicales belges, second series, vol. 14.
- Le Bibliophile belge, vol. 6.
- Bulletin de l'Académie royale de médecine de Belgique, third series, vol. 5.
- Bulletin de la Commission royale d'Histoire, third series, vol. 12.
- Bulletins d'arboriculture, de floriculture et de culture potagère
- Gilde de Saint-Thomas et de Saint-Luc, Bulletin des séances, 1863-1869 (Bruges, Tournai and Leuven)
- Revue de Belgique, vol. 3.
- Revue de la numismatique belge, fifth series, vol. 3.

Official publications

- Code des contributions directes, douanes et accises de la Belgique, en vigueur au 1er janvier 1871
- Moniteur belge: journal officiel
- Rapport triennal sur la situation de l'instruction primaire en Belgique
- Rapport triennal sur l'état de l'enseignement moyen en Belgique

Other

- Léon d'Andrimont, Des institutions et des associations ouvrières de la Belgique
- Émile de Borchgrave, Essai historique sur les colonies belges qui s'établirent en Hongrie et en Transylvanie pendant les XIe, XIIe et XIIIe siècles (Brussels)
- Jean-Baptist David, Manuel de l'histoire de Belgique
- Edouard Dupont, Les temps antéhistoriques en Belgique (Brussels, Mucquardt)
- J.S.G. Nypels, Pasinomie. Collection complète des lois, décrets, arrêtés et régelements généraux qui peuvent être invoqués en Belgique
- Adolphe Quetelet, Histoire des sciences mathématiques et physiques chez les Belges
- Eugène Somerhausen, Code politique de la Belgique
- Edward Van Even, Mengelingen voor de geschiedenis van Braband

== Births ==
- 10 January – Emiel van Heurck, folklorist (died 1931)
- 8 February – Médard Tytgat, illustrator (died 1948)
- 14 May – Louis de Brouchoven de Bergeyck, politician (died 1938)
- 26 May – Camille Huysmans, politician (died 1968)
- 29 May – Pieter Franciscus Dierckx, painter (died 1950)
- 1 June – Charles Théodore Bernier, engraver (died 1950)
- 8 June – Aloys Van de Vyvere, politician (died 1961)
- 12 June – Lu Zhengxiang (in Shanghai), abbot (died 1949)
- 9 July – Auguste-Léopold Huys, missionary (died 1938)
- 11 July – Armand Huyghé, soldier (died 1944)
- 23 July – Ovide Decroly, psychologist (died 1932)
- 30 September – Adolphe Stoclet, art collector (died 1949)
- 5 October – Karl Hanquet, historian (died 1928)
- 30 November – Emile de Cartier de Marchienne, diplomat (died 1946)
- 29 December – Emmanuel Foulon, Olympic archer (died 1945)

== Deaths ==
- 8 January – Henri Eugène Lucien Gaëtan Coemans (born 1825), priest and botanist
- 18 January – Princess Joséphine Marie of Belgium (born 1870)
- 2 February – Jan Frans Loos (born 1799), politician
- 10 February – Étienne Constantin de Gerlache (born 1785), first Prime Minister of Belgium
- 26 February – Charles Niellon (born 1795), veteran
- 26 March – François-Joseph Fétis (born 1784), musicologist
- 18 May – Constance Trotti (born 1800), hostess and patron of the arts
- October – Théodore Fourmois (born 1814), artist
