= François Musin =

Belgian painter (1820-1888)

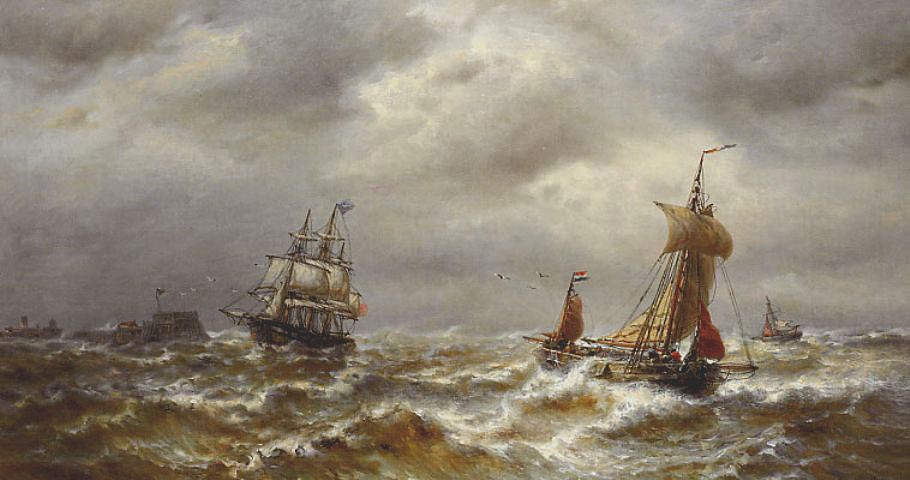
Fishermen in Stormy Weather

François-Etienne Musin (4 October 1820 – 24 October 1888) was a Belgian painter from Ostend who specialized in seascapes and scenes of coastal landscapes, rivers and harbours.

== Life ==
Musin's father was an innkeeper, shipbuilder and oyster farmer who had spent some time in a penal regiment for desertion during the Napoleonic Wars. As a child, he paid more attention to the sea than his studies. His artistic talent was discovered when he was locked in the attic as punishment and used a piece of charcoal to draw a view of the Ostend docks on the wall.

In 1831, he received his first lessons from Michel Van Cuyck and François-Antoine Bossuet, who would later become famous for his vedute, but was still working for the Port of Ostend at that time. He later attended the local Beaux Arts Academy and graduated after winning a gold medal in 1835. By this time he had already gained some dangerous experience with ships and sailing while tending to his father's oyster beds.

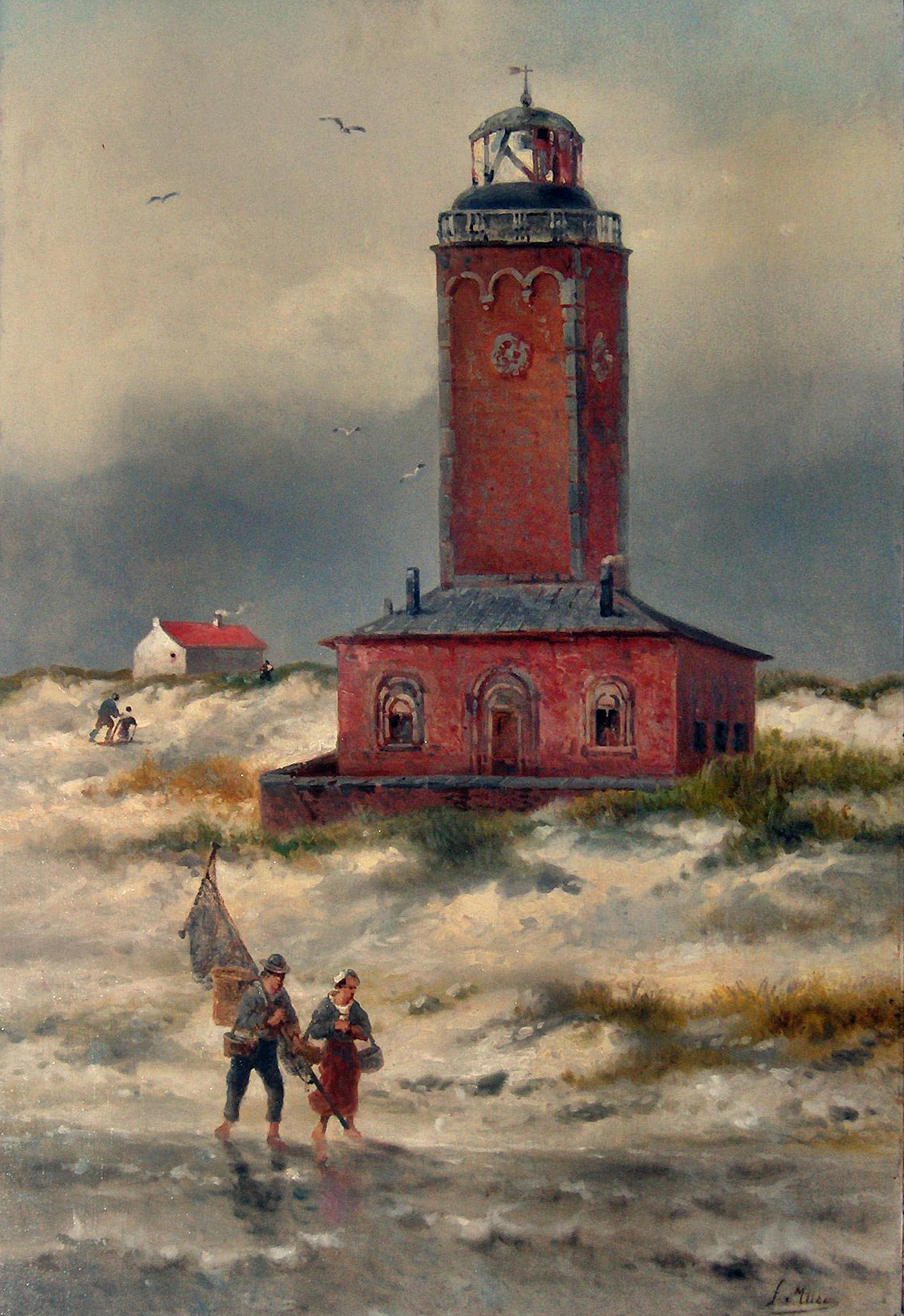
Old Lighthouse with Shrimp Fishermen

He continued his studies at the Académie Royale des Beaux-Arts of Brussels, where he studied under François-Joseph Navez. While there, he made drawings of surgical procedures in the operating room of Doctor Louis-Joseph Seutin, with the intention of publishing them in a textbook. In 1839, he was drafted in the Army, but his father paid for a replacement (a common practice at the time). In 1840, he began to exhibit and moved to Brussels permanently in 1842, completing his studies the following year. His career was substantially advanced when King Leopold I bought two of his paintings in 1845.

=== Business affairs ===
Because of the interest for his art that existed in England, Musin spent some time there, also travelling to Spain and Portugal. He returned home in 1848 when his father fell ill. In 1849, he married the painter Marie-Célestine Gosselin (1826–1853). After his wife's early death, he gave his share of the family business to his brother Auguste, in return for studio and exhibition space in the family's restaurant. He had also acquired some public land where he built the "Pavilion des Dunes", the first structure on the beach, which he rented out and also occasionally used as a studio. In 1863, Leopold I built his Royal Pavilions nearby, which inspired a real-estate boom and, in 1865, Musin converted the Pavilion into a hotel. It was sold in 1877, demolished in 1879 and replaced by the "Splendid Hotel" which was destroyed in World War II.

During these years, Musin travelled extensively, visiting Portugal, the Alps, France, North America and Norway, where he may have participated in a whaling expedition. All of these travels produced reams of sketches that were elaborated on in his studio. In 1869, he finally settled in Saint-Josse-ten-Noode where he built a huge garden studio, collected maritime antiques and gave his son Auguste his first art lessons. His sister-in-law lived with them as housekeeper until her death in 1877.

=== Patrons and whales ===
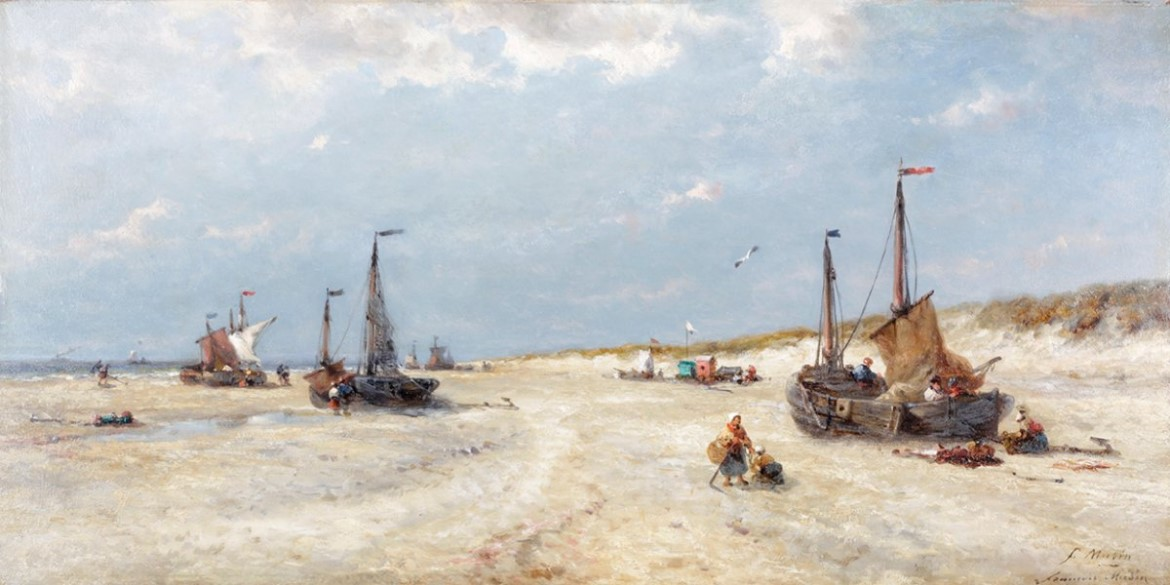
On the beach at Katwijk

Ever since Kaiser Wilhelm I ordered eight seascapes in 1853, royal customers had been a major source of his income. In 1865, two paintings were bought by the royal family of Württemberg and, in 1873, two were acquired by Naser al-Din Shah Qajar. In 1869, the Museo del Prado bought his painting "The Cannon Shot - Signal for the Revolt of Cadíz", and he was awarded the Order of Charles III. Curiously though, the Belgian government did not buy any of his works until 1880.

In 1885, a whale carcass washed ashore at Ostend and became quite a sensation. Musin painted a pochade (coloured sketch) of the scene, which was also captured by Willy Finch and James Ensor.

Musin died in Saint-Josse-ten-Noode of a stroke. His friends and family recalled him as a hedonist who was always in a good mood and ready to recount his many adventures. His paintings were unusually popular with forgers, leading his son to contrive various means of identifying the originals, including certificates of authenticity and wax stamps.
