= 1873 in Belgium =

- Decades: 1850s; 1860s; 1870s; 1880s; 1890s
- See also: Other events of 1873; List of years in Belgium

Events in the year 1873 in Belgium.

== Incumbents ==
Monarch: Leopold II
Head of government: Barthélémy de Theux de Meylandt

== Events ==
- 13 January
  - Convention with The Netherlands for building water defences on the Zwin comes into effect.
  - Treaty with The Netherlands for the building of a railway line from Antwerp to Mönchengladbach over Dutch territory ("Iron Rhine Treaty") signed in Brussels.
- 18 May – Law allowing the formation of limited liability companies.
- 29 June – Mass demonstration in support of the right of Jozef Schoep, labourer, to use the Dutch language to register his child's birth.
- 10 July – Paul Verlaine shoots at Arthur Rimbaud, slightly injuring him.
- 8 August – Paul Verlaine sentenced to two years in prison for injuring Arthur Rimbaud with a fire arm.
- 23 July – Commercial treaty with France.
- 17 August – Law allowing the use of Dutch in courts of law.
- 27 December – Formal opening of the Bourse Palace.

== Art and architecture ==
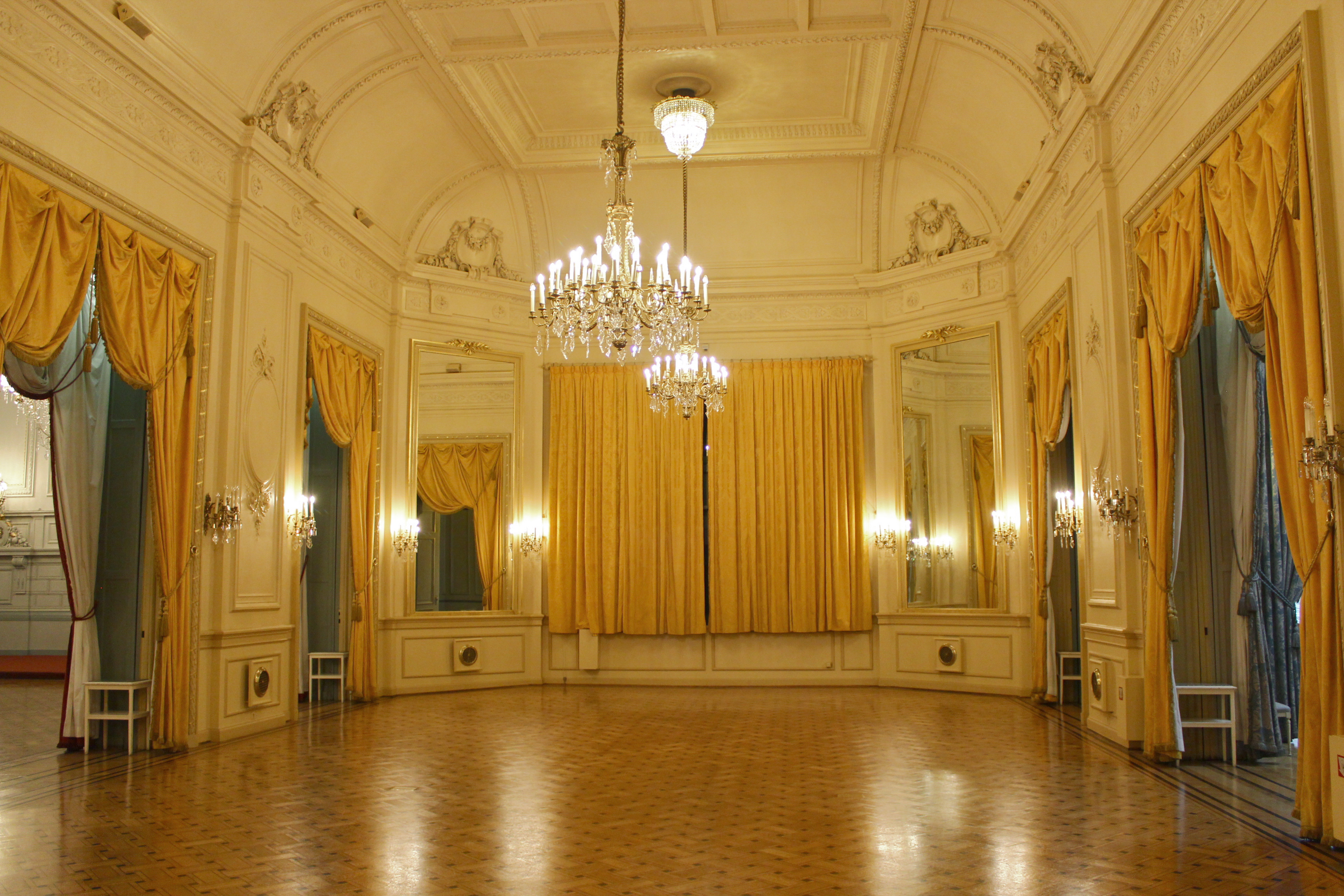
Concert Noble ballroom (1873)

Buildings

- Léon-Pierre Suys, Bourse Palace
- Concert Noble ballroom, Brussels

Paintings

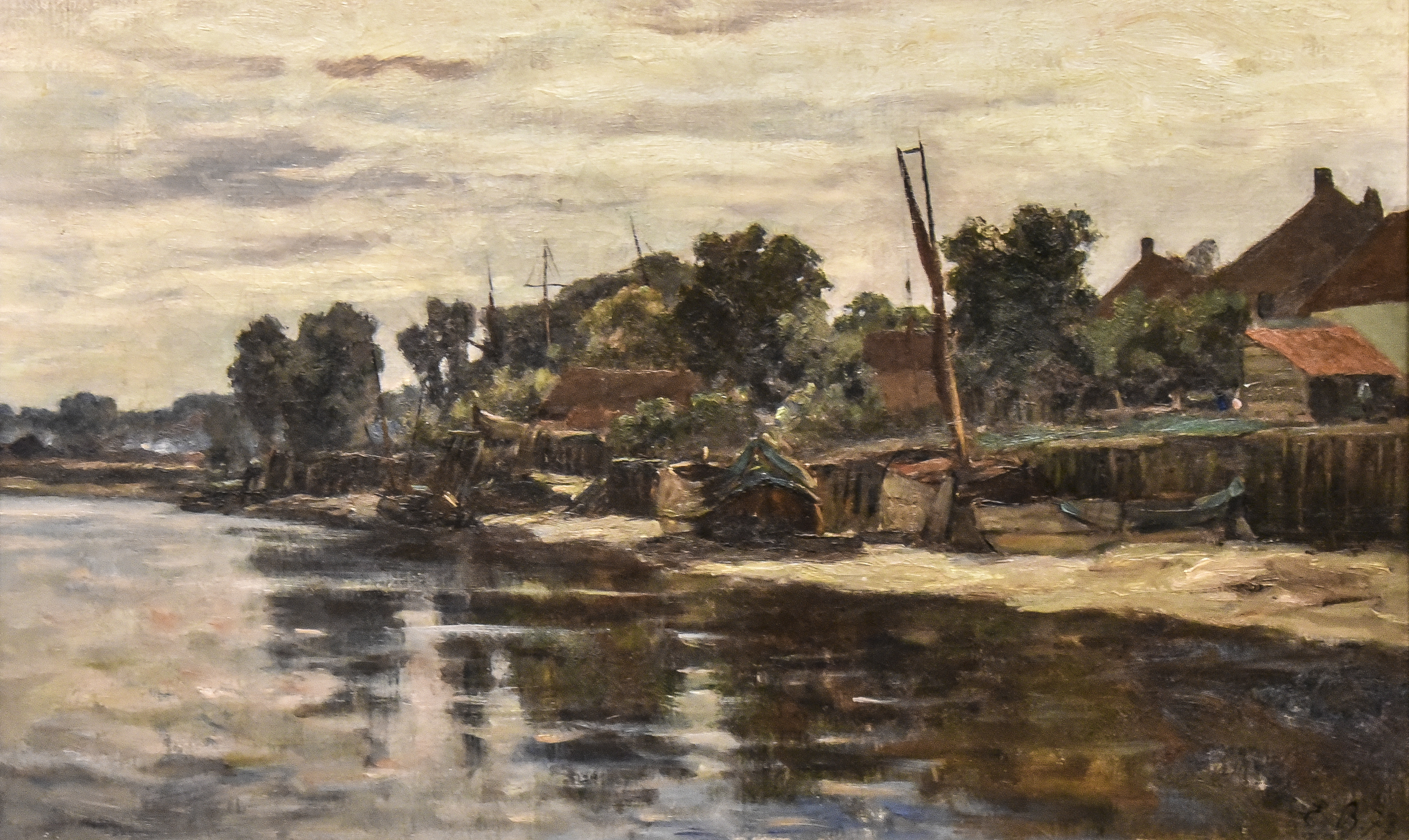
Euphrosine Beernaert, The Scheldt in Burcht (1873), now in M – Museum Leuven

- Euphrosine Beernaert, The Scheldt in Burcht

== Publications ==
- Ministry of Public Works, Chemin de fer de l'état. Postes – Télégraphes. Compte-rendu des opérations pendant l'année 1872 (Brussels, Fr. Gobbaerts).
- Henri Guillaume, Histoire des bandes d'ordonnance des Pays-Bas (Brussels, Académie Royale)
- Jules Helbig, Histoire de la peinture au pays de Liège
- Émile de Laveleye, Des causes actuelles de guerre en Europe et de l'arbitrage
- Eugène Van Bemmel, Patria Belgica: Encyclopédie nationale, vol. 1 (Brussels, Bruylant-Christophe & Cie., 1874)

== Births ==
- 9 February – Maurits Sabbe, man of letters (died 1938)
- 28 February – Georges Theunis, politician (died 1966)
- 17 June – Clara Ward, Princesse de Caraman-Chimay (died 1926)
- 23 July – Marie Janson, politician (died 1960)
- 25 July – Henri Meunier, graphic artist (died 1922)
- 26 July – Pierre Nolf, scientist (died 1953)
- 16 September – Alfred Bastien, painter (died 1955)
- 14 December – Joseph Jongen, composer (died 1953)

== Deaths ==
- 30 January – Emile Pierre Joseph De Cauwer (born 1828), painter
- 5 May – Albert Goblet d'Alviella (born 1790), politician
- 6 June – Ignatius Josephus van Regemorter (born 1785), artist
- 1 December – Augustin de Backer (born 1809) Jesuit bibliographer
- 9 December – Martinus Dom (born 1791), abbot of Westmalle
