= 1874 in Belgium =

- Decades: 1850s; 1860s; 1870s; 1880s; 1890s
- See also: Other events of 1874; List of years in Belgium

Events in the year 1874 in Belgium.

== Incumbents ==
Monarch: Leopold II
Head of government: Barthélémy de Theux de Meylandt (to 21 August); Jules Malou (from 21 August)

== Events ==
- 20 January – Royal decree providing for subsidies to the dramatic arts.
- 19 March – Extradition treaty with the United States of America.
- 25 May – Provincial elections
- 1 June – Service starts on Brussels–Charleroi railway line. Nivelles railway station inaugurated.
- 9 June – Partial legislative elections of 1874
- 21 August – Prime Minister Barthélémy de Theux de Meylandt dies in office; succeeded by Jules Malou
- 2 September – Convention with The Netherlands for improvements to the Ghent–Terneuzen Canal signed in Brussels.
- 10 September – Postal convention with Peru signed in Brussels.
- 24 December – Extradition treaty with the German Empire, replacing earlier treaties with individual German states.

== Publications ==
- Pasinomie: collection complète des lois, décrets, ordonnances, arrêtés et règlements généraux qui peuvent être invoqués en Belgique. 1874. (Brussels).
- Émile de Laveleye, De la Proprieté et de ses Formes Primitives
- Eugène Van Bemmel, Patria Belgica: Encyclopédie nationale, vol. 2 (Brussels, Bruylant-Christophe & Cie., 1874)

== Art and architecture ==
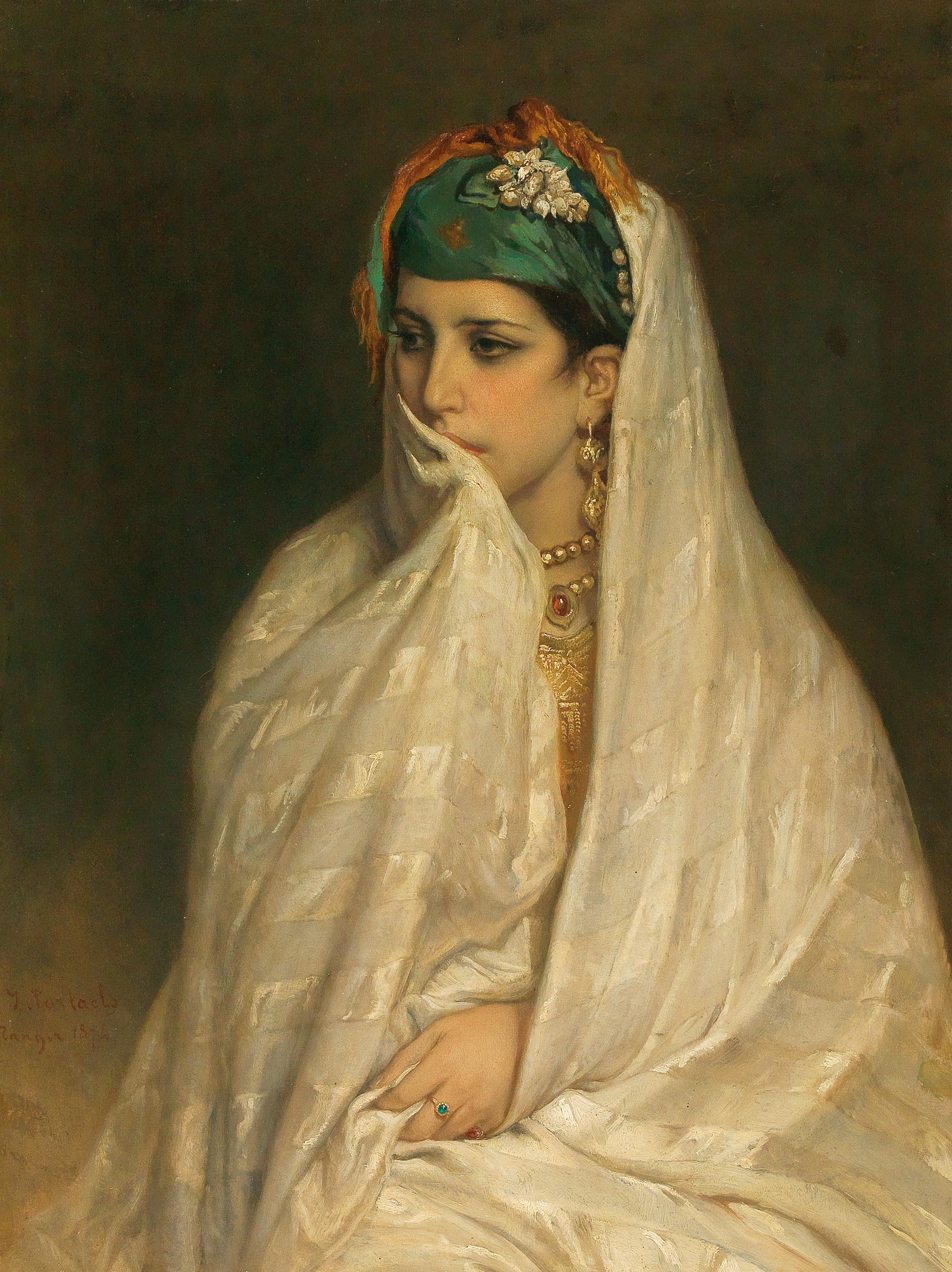
Jean-François Portaels, Juive de Tanger (1874)

Paintings

- Jean-François Portaels, Juive de Tanger

== Births ==
- 13 January – Jozef-Ernest van Roey, archbishop (died 1961)
- 26 February – Gaston-Antoine Rasneur, bishop (died 1939)
- 19 April – Firmin Baes, painter (died 1943)

== Deaths ==
- 17 February – Adolphe Quetelet (born 1796), mathematician
- 23 May – Sylvain Van de Weyer (born 1802), politician
- 4 July – Hippolyte Boulenger (born 1837), painter
- 21 August – Barthélémy de Theux de Meylandt (born 1794)
- 6 December – Gustaf Wappers (born 1803), painter
