= 1872 in Belgium =

- Decades: 1850s; 1860s; 1870s; 1880s; 1890s
- See also: Other events of 1872; List of years in Belgium

Events in the year 1872 in Belgium.

== Incumbents ==
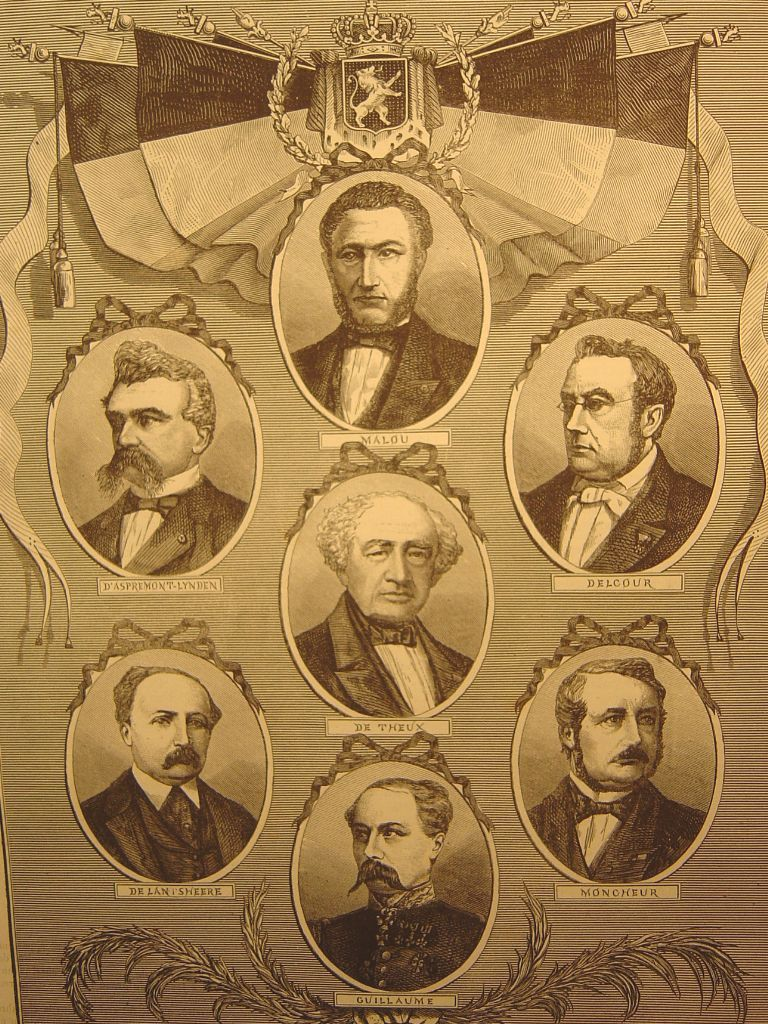
The Belgian ministry in 1872, de Theux in the centre, from L'Illustration Européenne 1872, no. 22, p. 173

Monarch: Leopold II
Head of government: Barthélémy de Theux de Meylandt

== Events ==
- 24 May – Convention with The Netherlands for building water defences on the Zwin signed in Bruges.
- 27 May – Provincial elections
- 11 June – Partial legislative elections of 1872
- 13 June – Postal convention with the Russian Empire signed in St Petersburg.
- 11 July – Convention with the German Empire regarding the Belgian State Railways taking over the railway lines between Spa and Gouvy and between Pepinster and Spa (formerly run by the French company Chemins de fer de l'Est) signed in Berlin.
- 31 July – Extradition treaty with the United Kingdom of Great Britain and Ireland signed in Brussels.
- 23 October – Extradition treaty with the Grand Duchy of Luxembourg signed in The Hague.
- 26 October – Convention with the Grand Duchy of Luxembourg for rail connections between Belgium and Luxembourg.
- 15 November – Maredsous Abbey founded
- 10 December – Henri Guillaume resigns as Minister of War after failing to get the government to adopt a policy of personal military service.
- 25 December – Extradition treaty with the Russian Empire comes into effect.

== Arts and architecture ==
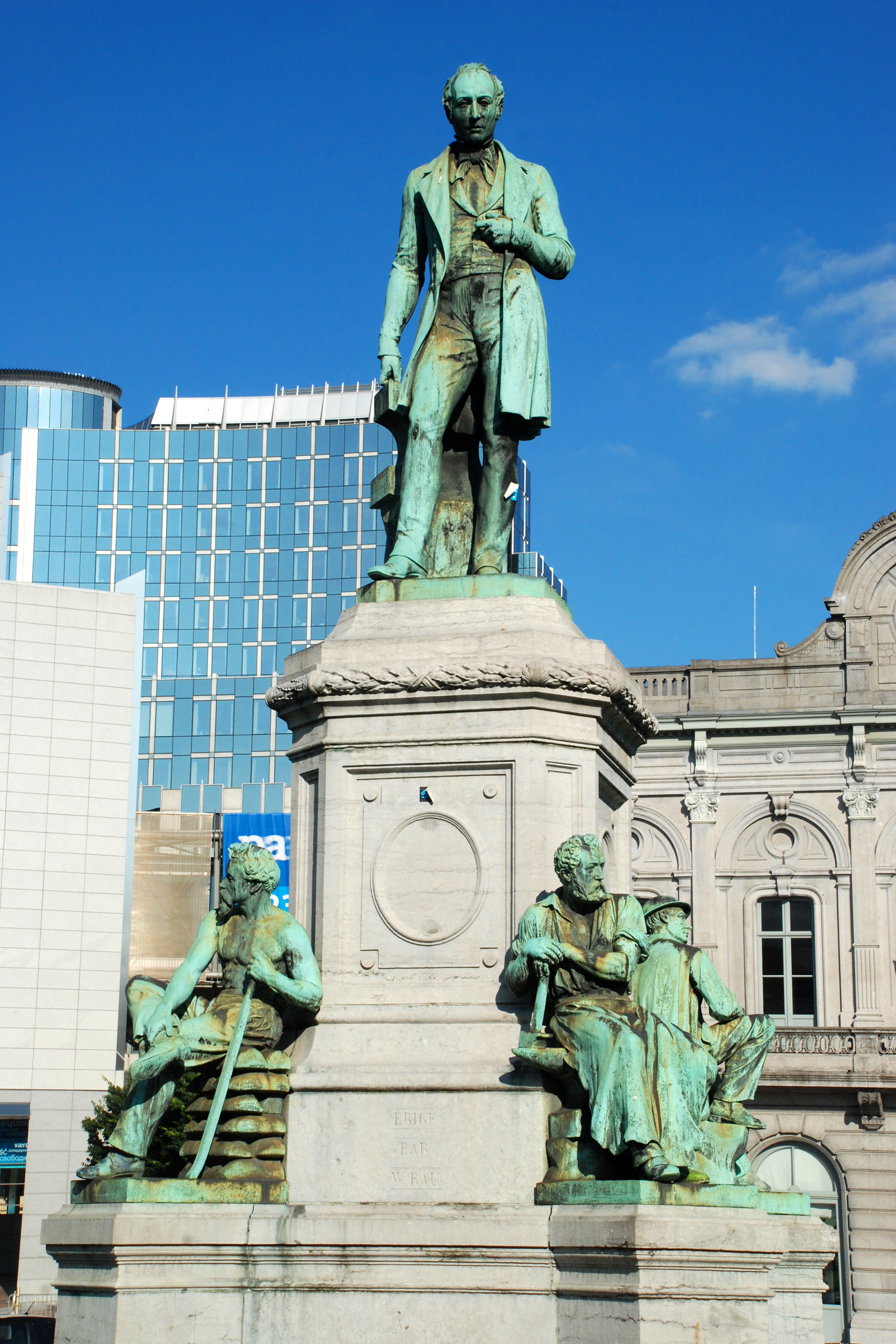
Monument to the industrialist John Cockerill

- Monument to John Cockerill inaugurated in Ixelles.
- 15 May – Statue of Isabelle Brunelle, sculpted by Guillaume Geefs, unveiled in the garden of the Hospice d'Harscamp, Namur.

== Publications ==
- Émile de Laveleye, Essai sur les Formes de Gouvernement dans les Sociétés Modernes
- P. Rombouts and T. van Lerius, De liggeren en andere historische archieven der Antwerpsche Sint Lucasgilde (Antwerp)
- Hippolyte Tarlier, Dictionnaire des communes belges, des hameaux, charbonnages, carrières, mines, châteaux, fermes, moulins, etc. (Brussels)

== Births ==
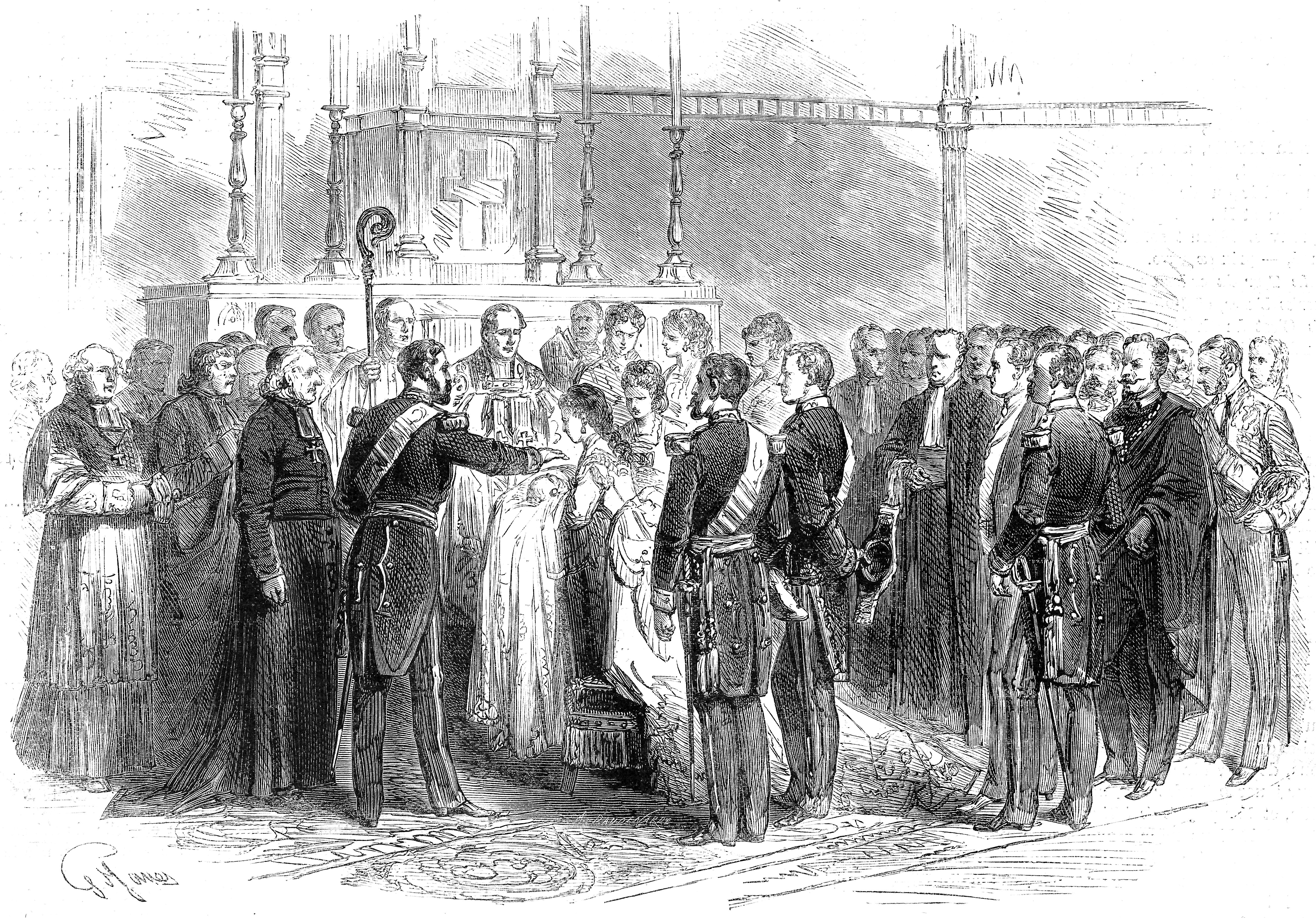
Christening of Princess Clémentine of Belgium, 2 September 1872

- 23 February – Fernande de Cartier de Marchienne (died 1903)
- 30 May – Paul-Émile Janson, politician (died 1944)
- 8 June – Jan Frans De Boever, painter (died 1949)
- 9 July – Jacques Mesnil, art writer (died 1940)
- 30 July – Princess Clémentine of Belgium (died 1955)
- 19 August – Théophile de Donder, physicist (died 1957)
- 23 September – Marie Depage, nurse (died 1915)
- 22 November – Cécile Thévenet, opera singer (died 1956)
- 8 December – Jules Buyssens, landscape architect (died 1958)
- 28 December – Amandina of Schakkebroek, missionary martyr (died 1900)

== Deaths ==
- 5 January – G. Henry Wouters (born 1802), Church historian
- 8 May – Alexandre Bivort (born 1809), pomologist
- 10 May – Félix Victor Goethals (born 1798), librarian
- 1 June – Edouard Terwecoren (born 1815), Jesuit author
- 5 June – Charles-Joseph Voisin (born 1802), art historian
- 3 July – Ferdinand Augustijn Snellaert (born 1809), writer
- 22 October – Jules Borgnet (born 1817), archivist
- 23 October – Victor Coremans (born 1802), archivist
- 16 November – Gaspard-Joseph Labis (born 1792), bishop
