= The Man in the Chair =

Painting by Henri de Braekeleer

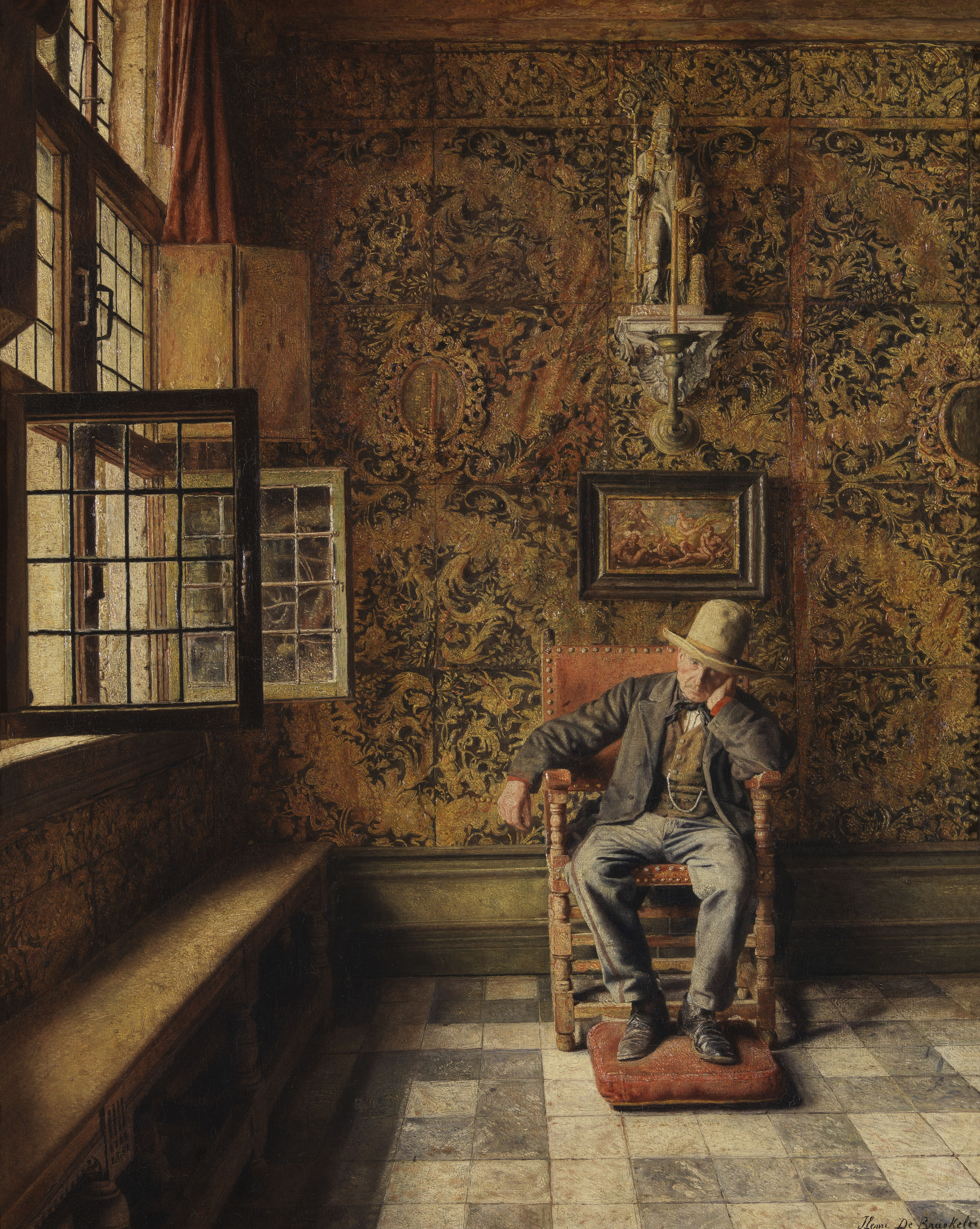
- Artist: Henri de Braekeleer
- Year: 1875
- Catalogue: 1845
- Medium: Oil on canvas
- Dimensions: 79 cm × 63 cm (31.1 in × 24.8 in)
- Location: Royal Museum of Fine Arts Antwerp; Antwerp

The Man in the Chair is an 1875 oil on canvas painting by Belgian painter Henri de Braekeleer. The painting is currently housed at the Royal Museum of Fine Arts in Antwerp.

== Setting ==
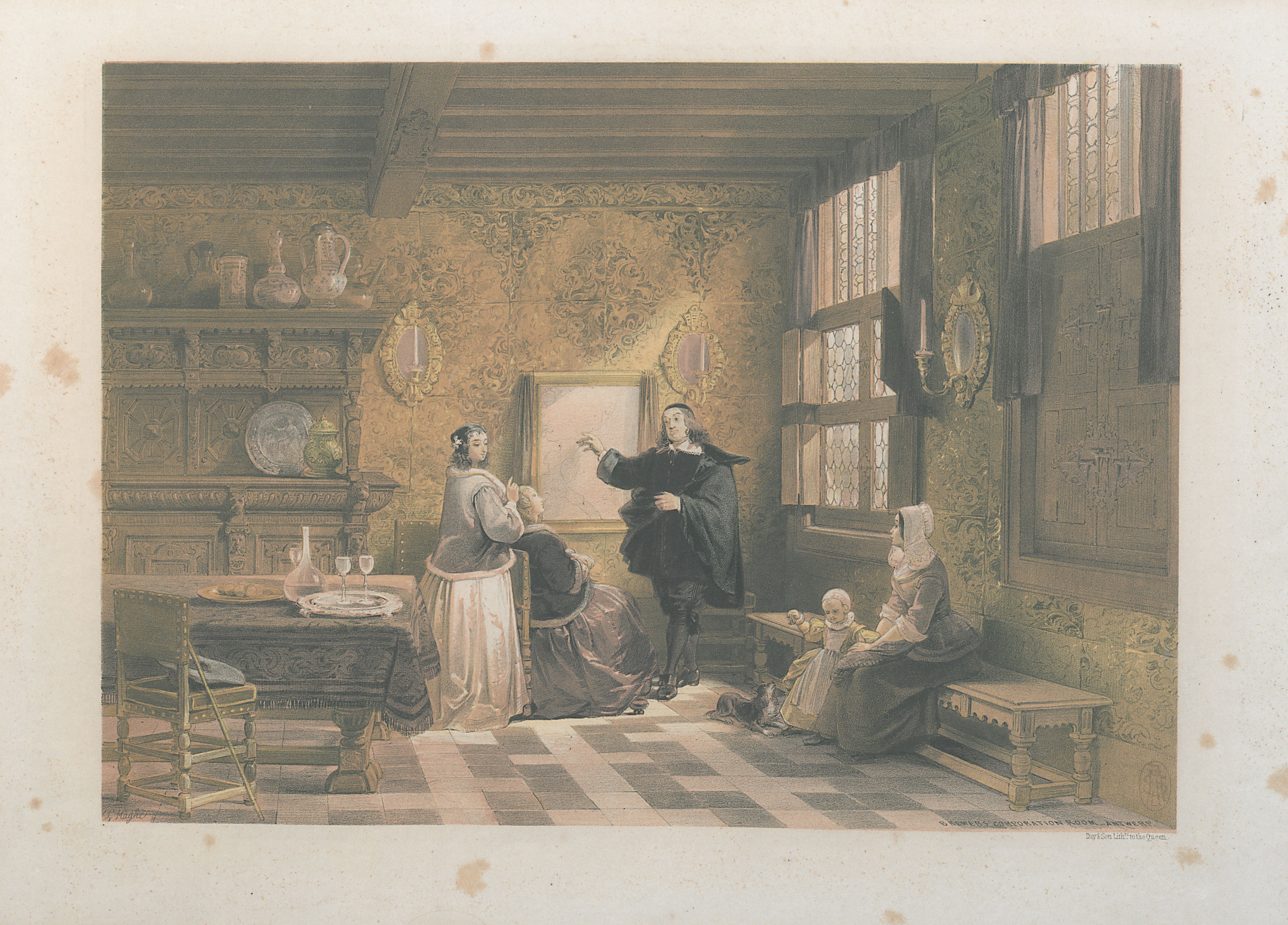
Lithograph of a room in the Brouwershuis, ca. 1849

De Braekeleer used the Brouwershuis in Antwerp as the setting for The Man in the Chair. The painting was exhibited for the first time under the title Room in the Brouwershuis.

The Brouwershuis, or Waterhuis, in Antwerp is a building dating from 1554, built by order and according to plans by Gilbert van Schoonbeke. The house was located on the Eerste Antwerpse vliet in what was then Nieuwstad. Water was pumped up into the structure and from thence distributed to the approximately sixteen surrounding breweries that had largely established themselves on the vliet; this is why the first vliet was called Brouwersvliet. The entrance to the building is today on Adriaan Brouwerstraat. The building also has a façade, without access, on the Brouwersvliet, which was filled up in 1930 and converted into a boulevard, which includes the tunnel mouth and the first part of the tunnel shaft of the Waasland tunnel under the Scheldt.

Henri Leys, uncle and teacher of De Braekeleer, introduced the artist to this place. Both painters incorporated the centuries-old interior into their oeuvre several times.

== Painting ==
The painting shows an old man sitting in a chair (or on his throne) with his feet on a cushion. He sits beside an open window.

Above the man's head there hangs a painting and a statue of Saint Arnolfus. Daylight enters the room through the open window. De Braekeleer worked out the small details very carefully in this oeuvre.

This painting appears to be a traditional genre scene: an anonymous character in a banal situation. Yet there is poetry in the work because of the artist's tireless concentration and subtle sensitivity to the various shapes of light and his use of coloring and various elements.

De Braekeleer wasn't interested in historicity or historical reconstruction; rather, in this painting he used the Brouwershuis as a peculiar, contemporary antique curiosity. The old man, sitting on his throne, looking straight at us, might represent a tangent memento mori; highlighting the past glory of the Brouwershuis, its collapse, and eventual desertion.

The identity of the sitter is unknown. The old man doesn't appear in de Braekeleer's sketches for the painting.
