= Sylvain Balau =

Sylvain Balau (1854–1915) was a Catholic priest and contemporary historian from Belgium.

== Life ==
Balau was born in Cortil-Noirmont (now a subdivision of Chastre in Walloon Brabant) on 12 June 1854. He held a teaching position at the Collège Saint-Quirin in Huy from 1877, and was ordained priest in Liège on 22 January 1878. From the late 1880s he served in turn in the parishes of Huy, Modave, and Pepinster, while beginning to publish on historical topics. A historical autodidact, in 1894 he audited Godefroid Kurth's classes on source criticism at the University of Liège. Between 1905 and 1910 he contributed 16 articles to the Biographie Nationale de Belgique (vols. 18–20). On 24 February 1907 he was appointed an acting member of the Commission royale d'Histoire, and on 21 September 1912 a titular canon of Liège Cathedral. He died at Ingihoul on 10 July 1915. His edition of Chroniques liégeoises was left unfinished at the time of his death and was completed by his friend (and parishioner) Émile Fairon.

== Works ==
- Soixante-dix ans d'histoire contemporaine de Belgique (1888)
- La Belgique sous l'Empire et la défaite de Waterloo, 1804–1815 (2 vols., 1894)
- Histoire de la seigneurie de Modave (1895)
- Etude critique des sources de l'histoire du pays de Liège au moyen âge (1902–1903)
