= Michel Van Cuyck =

Belgian painter, watercolorist and lithographer

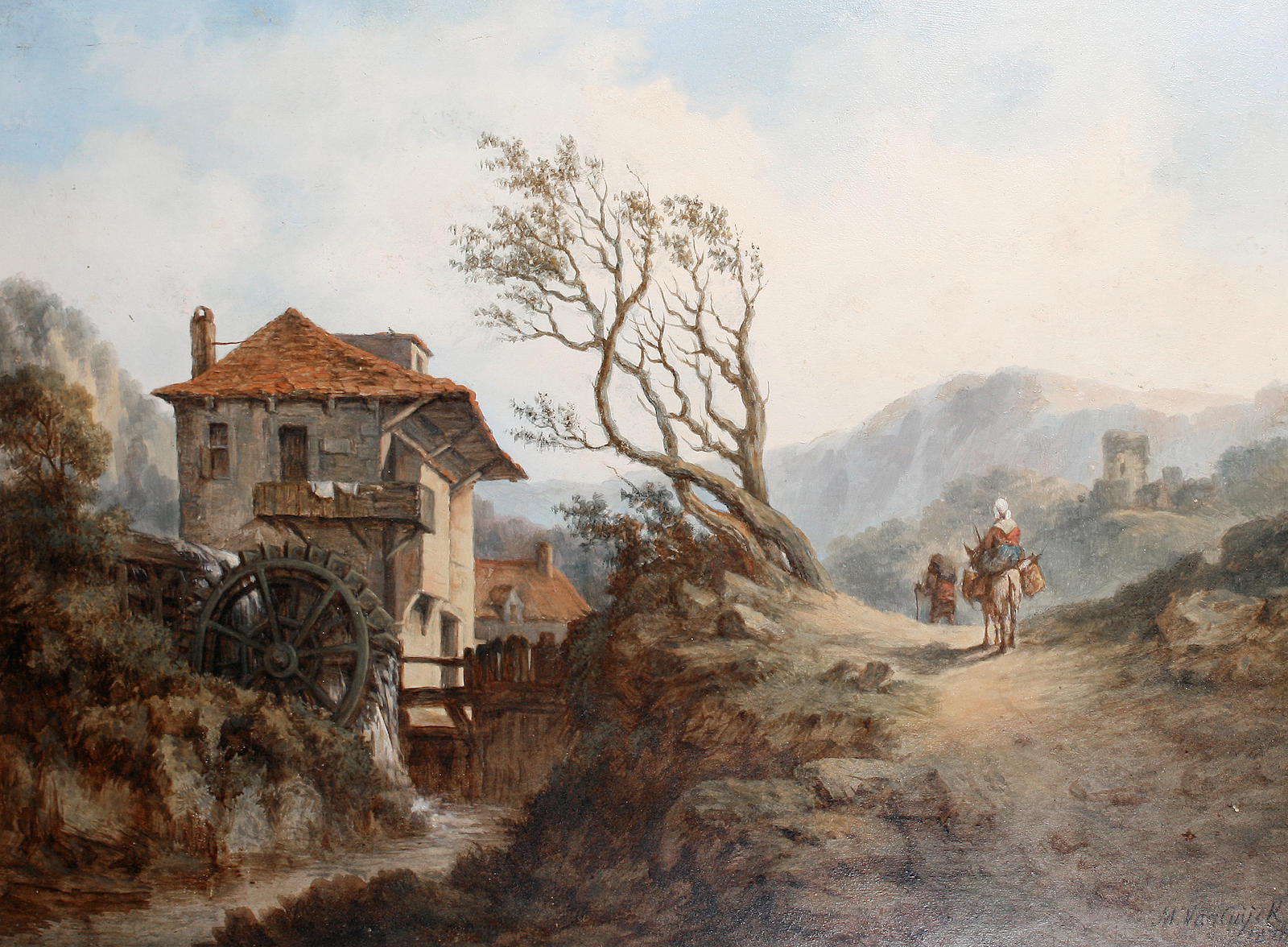
Travellers on a Road by a Watermill

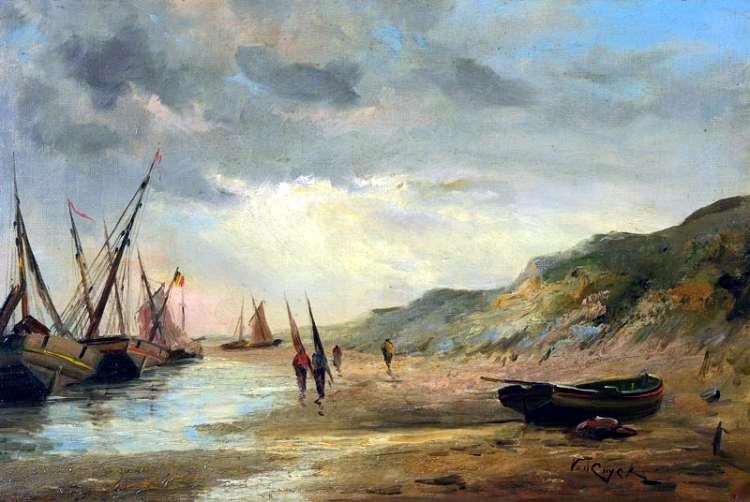
Fishing at the Beach

Michel Thomas Antonius Van Cuyck (19 August 1797, Ostend - 10 May 1875, Ostend) was a Belgian painter, watercolorist and lithographer.

== Biography ==
From 1811 to 1817, he studied at the Bruges Academy of Fine Arts. After graduating, he set up a studio in Oostende, but was forced to supplement his income by painting houses. In 1820, he and François-Antoine Bossuet co-founded the "School voor Teeken- en Bouwkunde" (School for drawing and architecture). They had several students who became well known, including Edgar Baes, Lionel Baes, François Musin and, especially, James Ensor. The latter, however, was not impressed by what he described as the "deceptive sponge and drawing technique of this dull, boring and stillborn business".

In 1827, a blue whale washed up on the beach near Ostend. Van Cuyck made a series of paintings, depicting it on the beach, and drawings of the dissection process, which accompanied an exhibition of the whale's skeleton. It was purchased by a local philanthropist named Herman Kessels who toured with it and Van Cuyck's drawings for almost four decades. Since 1865, it has been on display at the Russian Academy of Sciences in St. Petersburg.

During the years following independence, King Leopold I transformed Ostend into a sort of Royal Residence, which developed into a fashionable seaside resort. Van Cuyck was one of the first to depict the tourism and the bathing culture there. His beach scenes and seascapes are now some of his most familiar works. He also painted Flemish fairs and landscapes, primarily in Walloon Brabant, in Biedermeier style. His portrayal of Queen Louise on her deathbed was reproduced as a lithograph.

He was the first in a long line of painters, which included his sons, Edouard-Johannes Van Cuyck (1828-1893) and Michel Thomas Séraphin Van Cuyck (1822-1890), as well as his grandsons, Michel-Julien Van Cuyck (1861-1930), Octavius-Ludovicus Van Cuyck (1870-1956) and Paul-Edouard-Alphonse Van Cuyck (1882-?).

== Sources ==
- Norbert Hostyn, "Michel Van Cuyck", in : Handelingen van het Genootschap voor Geschiedenis (Acts of the Society for History), CXVI, 1979
- Nationaal Biografisch Woordenboek, Vol.12, Brussel, 1987
- Lexicon van Westvlaamse beeldende kunstenaars, Vereniging van Westvlaamse Schrijvers, 1992 ISBN 978-90-7239-015-8
- Norbert Hostyn, Beeldend Oostende, Van de Wiele, 1993 ISBN 978-90-696-6090-5
