= Émile Merlin =

Belgian mathematician and astronomer

Émile A. L. Merlin
- Born: 12 October 1875; Mons, Belgium
- Died: 29 July 1938 (aged 62); Le Bourg-d'Oisans, France
- Education: Ph.D.
- Alma mater: University of Liège; University of Ghent
- Awards: A. de Potter Prize
- Scientific career
- Fields: Mathematics, astronomy
- Institutions: University of Ghent

Émile Alphonse Louis Merlin (12 October 1875 in Mons – 29 July 1938 in Le Bourg d'Oisans) was a Belgian mathematician and astronomer.

Merlin attended the secondary school Athénée royal de Bruxelles. He then studied at the University of Liège and the University of Ghent, where in 1900 he received his doctorate in mathematics. This was followed by a stay abroad between 1901 and 1903 in Paris at the Sorbonne, at the Collège de France and in Göttingen. In 1904, he became an assistant at the observatory in Uccle. In 1909, he was promoted to astronomer adjoint. From 1912, he was a lecturer on astronomy and geodesy at the University of Ghent and in 1919, he became a full professor and director of the geographical station of the University of Ghent.

He was an alpinist and died in a mountain accident in the French Alps in Le Bourg d'Oisans.

Merlin was one of the editors for the French edition of Klein's encyclopedia.

For his work on celestial mechanics, he was awarded the A. de Potter Prize of the Royal Belgian Academy of Sciences. He was president of the Belgian Mathematical Society, an honorary member of the Astronomical Society of Mexico and a member of the Commission for Mathematics and Astronomy of the National Fund for Research in Spain. He was an Invited Speaker at the International Congress of Mathematicians in Toronto 1924 (Sur les lignes asymptotiques en géométrie infinitésimale) and Oslo 1936 (Sur certains mouvements des fluid parfaits).

== Selected publications ==
- with Paul Stroobant, Jules Delvosal, Hector Philippot, and Eugène Delporte: Les observatoires astronomiques et les astronomes. Hayez. 1907.
- Merlin, E. (1907). "La Répartition des Taches Solaires en Latitudes Héliographiques". Bulletin de la Société Belge d'Astronomie. 12: A179. Bibcode:1907BSBA...12A.179M.
- Merlin, E. (1908). "Sur la détermination systématique des éléments de la figure elliptique d'une planète au moyen de mesures micrométriques de diamètres". Astronomische Nachrichten. 178 (24): 391–394. Bibcode:1908AN....178..391M. doi:10.1002/asna.19081782404.
- Merlin, Emile (1908). "Observations d'etoiles doubles effectuees a l'equatorial de 38 centime tres EN 1906 et 1907". Annales de l'Observatoire Royal de Belgique Nouvelle Serie. 11: 75. Bibcode:1908AnOBN..11...75M.
- Merlin, Émile (1930). "Sur la résolution graphique des triangles sphériques et la détermination rapide de la longitude et de la latitude d'un lieu". Bulletin Astronomique. 6: 119. Bibcode:1930BuAst...6..119M.
- Merlin, E. (1938). "Sur une formule usitée en astronomie". Ciel et Terre. 54: 1. Bibcode:1938C&T....54....1M.
