= Edward Van Even =

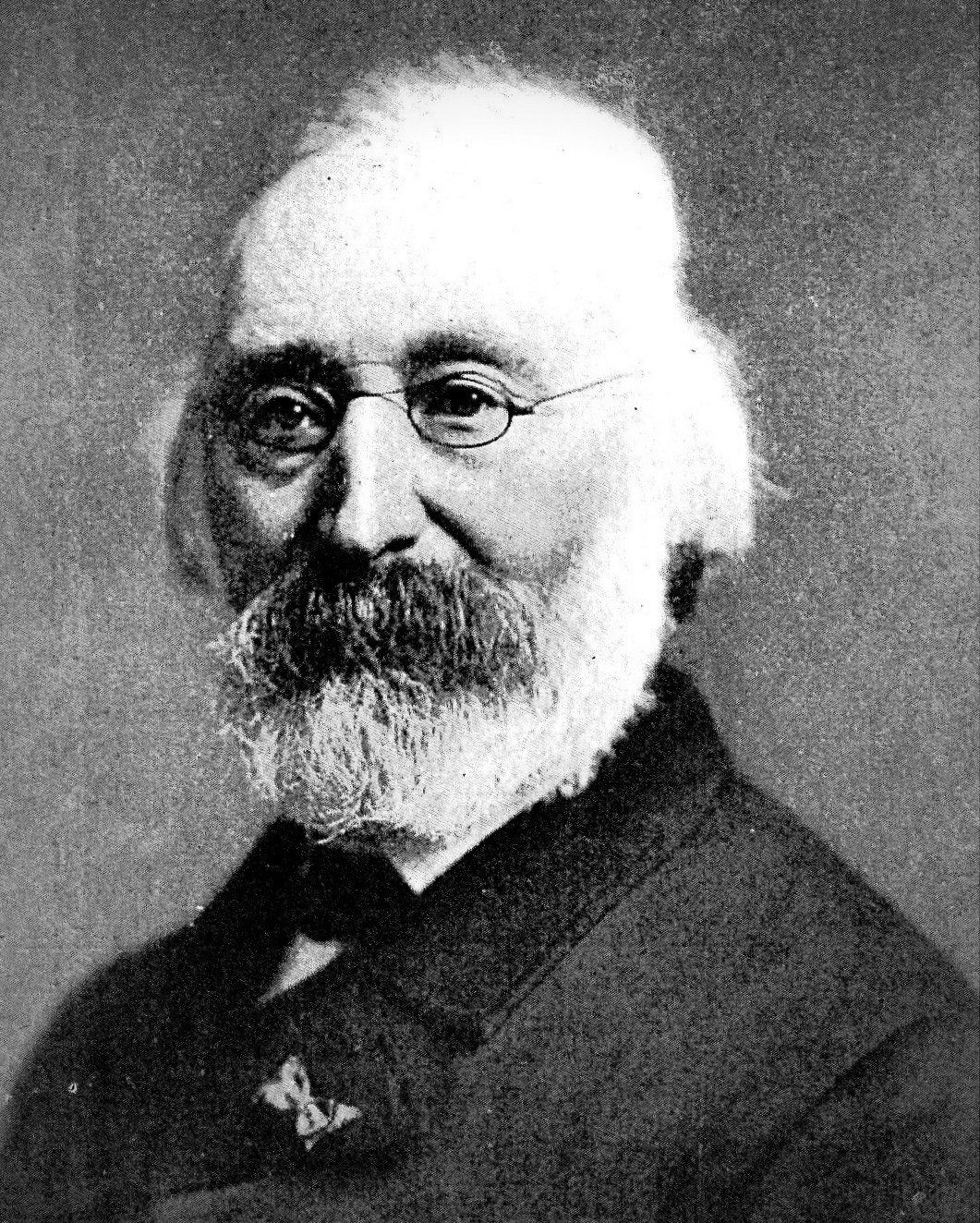

Edward Van Even (1821–1905) was a Belgian archivist, writer and historian.

== Life ==
Van Even was born in Leuven on 6 December 1821. In 1846 he was appointed assistant librarian to the Catholic University of Leuven, resigning in 1853 to take up a position working for the local council as city archivist and secretary of municipal festivals.

In addition to his function as archivist, Van Even was also in charge of the municipal museum, located in Leuven Town Hall. From this museum grew the Stedelijk Museum Vander Kelen-Mertens, now M - Museum Leuven, which after 1938 included his own collections. Van Even's sisters, who like their brother remained unmarried, donated parts of Van Even's collection to his friend Victor Demunter (1857-1939), curator of the municipal museum. Upon the death of his last surviving sister, Agnes Eugenia Van Even (1824-1911), the rest of the collection also ended up with Demunter, who transferred it to the city along with his collection in 1938.

Edward Van Even was a member of the Royal Academy of Dutch Language and Literature, the Royal Academy of Science, Letters and Fine Arts of Belgium, and the Royal Academy of Archaeology of Belgium.

He died in Leuven on 11 February 1905.

== Works ==
- Les Artistes de l'Hôtel de ville de Louvain (1852)
- Louvain monumental (1860)
- L'Ancienne École de peinture de Louvain (1870)
- Mengelingen voor de geschiedenis van Braband (1871)
- Inventaire chronologique et analytique des chartes et autres documents sur parchemin appartenant aux archives de la ville de Louvain (1873)
