= Blanche Rousseau =

Belgian writer and educator

Blanche Rousseau (22 January 1875 – 8 April 1949) was a Belgian writer and educator. She is mainly known for her writing for young people.

The daughter of Jean-Baptiste Rousseau, she was born in Ixelles. She took the Cours d'Éducation given by Isabelle Gatti de Gamond, becoming herself a teacher. Her friend Marie Closset, who wrote under the name Jean Dominique, also took the same classes. She took part in the literary salon of her uncle Ernest Rousseau and his wife Marietta Hannon Rousseau; there she met the geographer and anarchist Élisée Reclus and the artist James Ensor. From 1907 to 1912, she taught French literature at a middle school. In 1913, with her friends Marie Closset and Marie Gaspar, she established the Institut de culture française.

In 1895, she began publishing her first stories in the literary journal L’Art Jeune, which was founded by the poet Henri Vandeputte. There she met her future husband Maurice Belval, also a writer.

Rousseau died in Uccle at the age of 74.

== Selected works ==
- Nany à la fenêtre (1897)
- Tilette (1899)
- James Ensor, peintre, essay (1899)
- Le rabaga (1912)
- Lisette et sa pantoufle (1913)
- La Nuit de Mai; Féerie Enfantine En Cinq Tableaux (1923)
- Mon beau printemps, autobiographical (1950)
