= Jan Frans Loos =

Belgian politician (1799–1871)

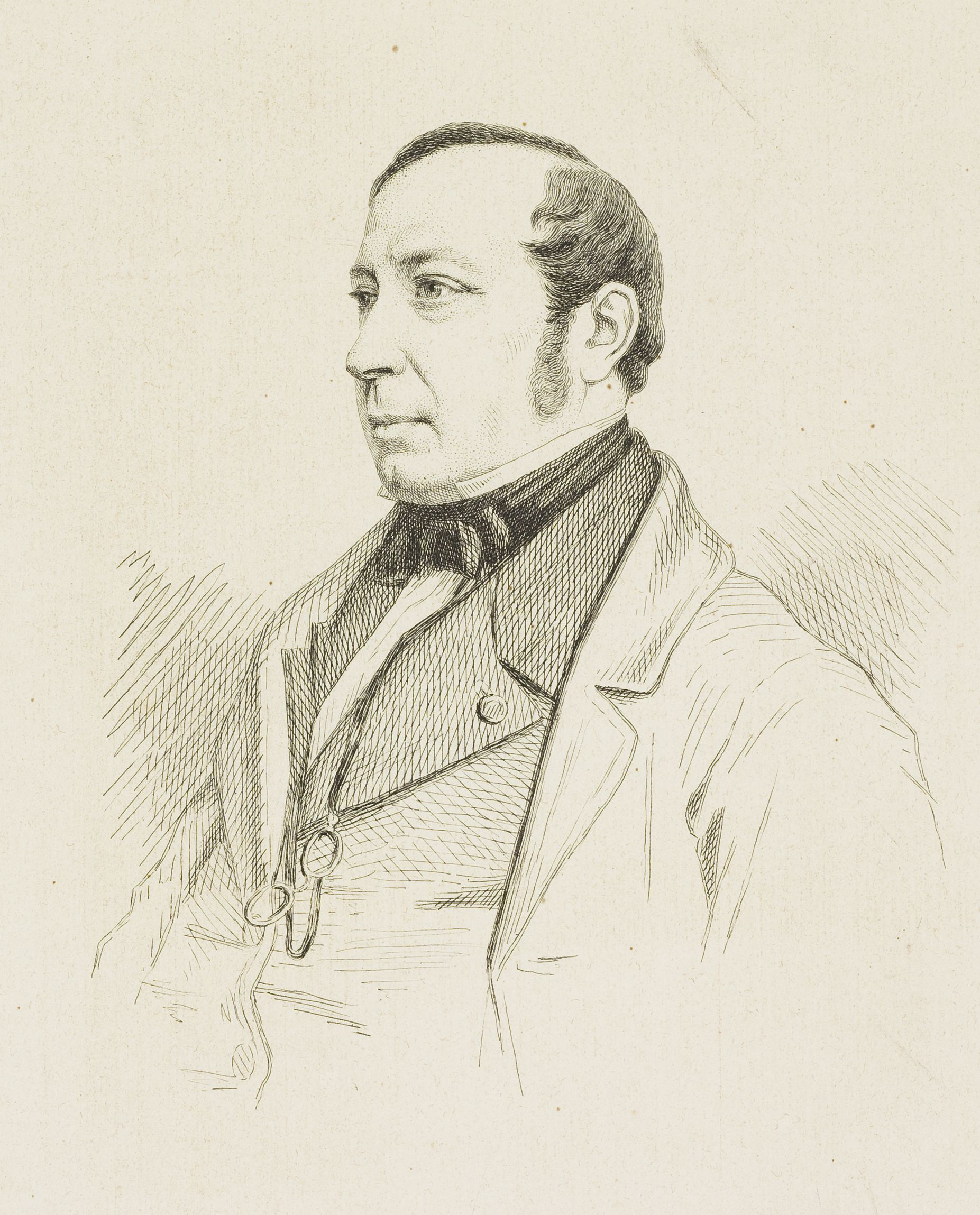
- Born: 12 November 1799
- Died: 2 February 1871 (aged 71)
- Occupation: politician

Jan Frans Loos (12 November 1799 – 2 February 1871) was a Belgian liberal politician. As mayor of Antwerp from 1848 until 30 March 1863 he was responsible for the modernization of Antwerp in the second half of the 19th century.

He demolished the old Spanish circumvallation of the city, which allowed the city to expand beyond its 16th century limits.

== Sources ==
- Jan Frans Loos (GvA)
