= Émile Fairon =

Belgian historian (1875–1945)

Émile Fairon (1875–1945) was a Belgian archivist and historian.

== Life ==
Fairon was born in Pepinster on 11 October 1875. After studying at the Athénée royal de Verviers he matriculated at the University of Liège, where he went on to obtain a doctorate in classical philology. In 1901 he started working at the Royal Library of Belgium, where he catalogued the seals and seal molds. In 1902 he qualified as an archivist, and in 1903 obtained a position at the State Archives in Liège. He became head of the depot in 1924, in succession to Léon Lahaye. During the 1930s he oversaw the transfer of the archives from the Provincial Palace to a purpose-built repository on the site of the defunct Liège-Jonfosse railway station. He died on 1 January 1945.

== Works ==
- "L'affaire Blanjean: un épisode d'histoire religieuse et diplomatique en 1633-1634", Bulletin de la Société Verviétoise d'Archéologie et d'Histoire, 11 (1910), pp. 115-160.
- Chroniques liégeoises, vol. 2 (1931) – edited by Sylvain Balau and posthumously prepared for publication by Fairon.
- Régestes de la Cité de Liège (4 vols., 1933–1939)
- with Henri Heuse, Lettres de Grognards (1936)
- Inventaire des archives de la Chambre des comptes (1937)
- Chartes confisquées aux bonnes villes du pays de Liège et du comté de Looz après la bataille d'Othée (1408) (1937)
