= L'Indépendance Belge =

L'Indépendance Belge (French pronunciation: [lɛ̃depɑ̃dɑ̃s bɛlʒ]; 1843–1940), initially published as L'Indépendant (French pronunciation: [lɛ̃depɑ̃dɑ̃]; 1831–1843), was a politically liberal newspaper of record published in Brussels, Belgium. The first issue appeared on 6 February 1831, the last on 13 May 1940. The title changed in 1843, but issues were numbered through continuously.

In 1850, the newspaper became the first subscriber to the news agency that Paul Reuter had just set up in Aachen.

Towards the end of the 19th century the newspaper ran into financial difficulties but was saved from bankruptcy by Ernest Solvay. During the First World War the newspaper moved its offices in turn to Ghent, Ostend, Folkestone, and finally London, returning to Brussels at the conclusion of the conflict.
