= Jules Borgnet =

Belgian archivist and historian

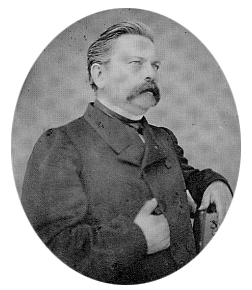
Portrait of Jules Borgnet

Charles Adolphe Jules Borgnet (1817–1872) was a Belgian archivist and historian who played an important role in introducing modern archival practices in the city of Namur. Charles Adolphe Jules Borgnet (1817–1872) was a Belgian archivist and historian who played an important role in introducing modern archival practices in the city of Namur.

== Life ==
Borgnet was born in Namur, United Kingdom of the Netherlands on 16 November 1817. After studying law at the University of Liège he developed an interest in history and in 1842 he was appointed by the governor of the Province of Namur to classify the archives preserved in the city's law courts, which included documents going back to the Middle Ages confiscated during the French period. In 1845 he was one of the founders of the Société archéologique de Namur. In 1848 he entered the service of the State Archives, which was then in the process of establishing a provincial repository in Namur, and in 1851 he was also appointed to teach history and geography at the Athénée royal de Namur. He died on 22 October 1872.

== Publications ==
- Protocole des délibérations de la municipalité de Namur du 26 janvier au 25 mars 1793, publié pour la première fois d'après le manuscrit déposé aux archives communales (1847)
- Compagnies militaires de la ville de Namur (1851)
- Anciennes fêtes namuroises (1856)
- Cartulaire de la Commune de Bouvignes (1862)
- Cartulaire de la Commune de Fosses (1867)
- Histoire du Comté de Namur (1869; reprinted 2009)
- Cartulaire de la Commune de Ciney (1869)
