= Charles François Prosper de Hemricourt de Grünne =

Belgian nobleman, politician and mayor

Charles François Prosper Count de Hemricourt de Grünne (1875 – 24 April 1937 in Amiens) was a Belgian nobleman, politician and mayor.

Charles was War volunteer in the First World War. He was elected mayor of Aalter, and took office between 1921 and 1932. Charles had constructed Loveld Castle in Aalter, and decorated it with the heritage of his mother in French Style.

== Honours ==
- Knight of the Order of Leopold.
- War Cross
- knight of the Legion of Honour.
