= Pieter Franciscus Dierckx =

Belgian painter (1862–1950)

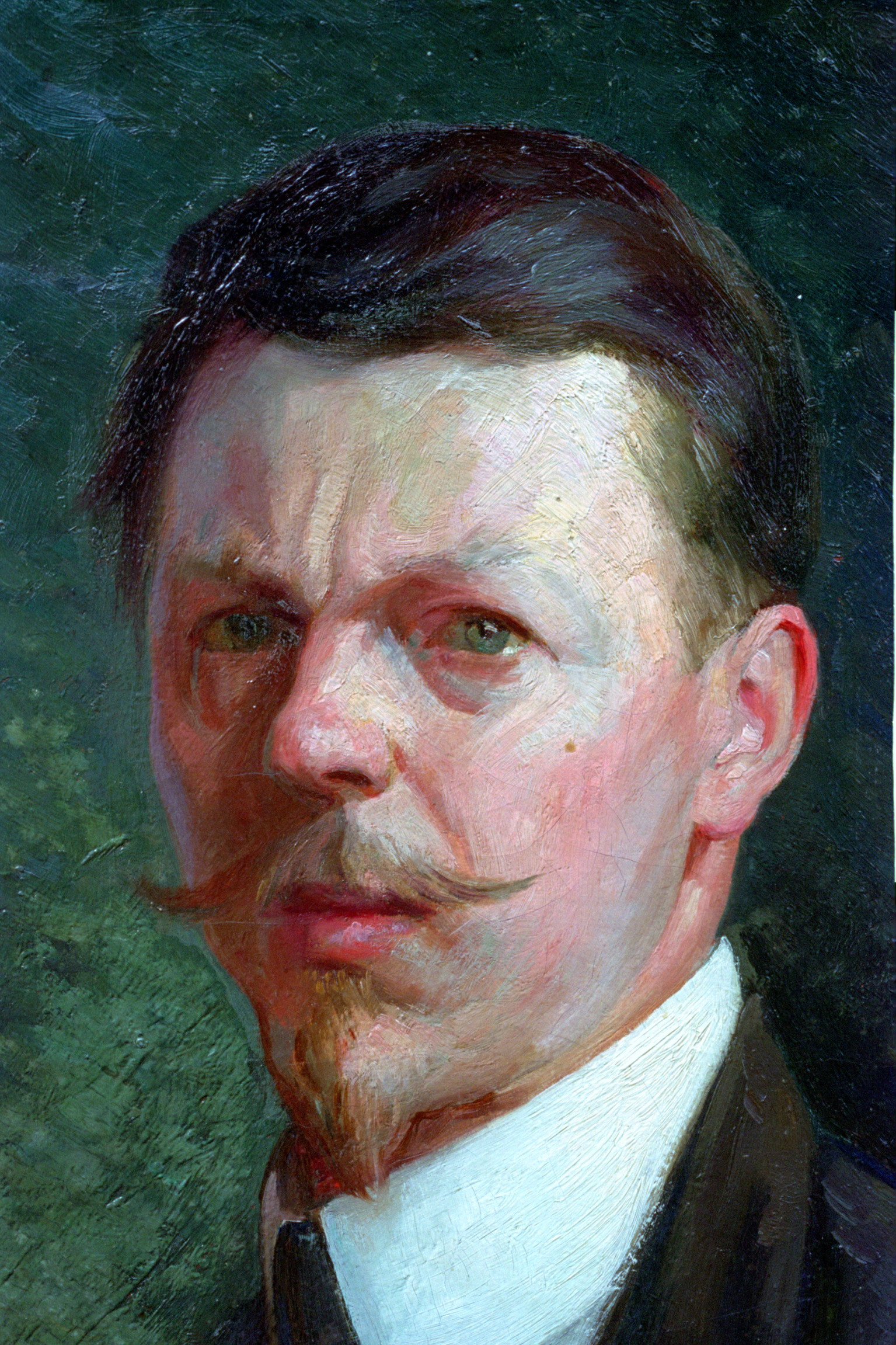
Pieter Dierckx

Pieter Franciscus Dierckx (29 May 1862 – 4 September 1950) was a Belgian impressionist painter.

== Life ==
Dierckx was born and died in Berchem (Antwerp). He studied at the Royal Academy of Fine Arts and at the higher institute of arts of Antwerp. His teachers included Juliaan De Vriendt, the former's brother Albrecht De Vriendt and Charles Verlat.

Pieter Dierckx became a member of the Antwerp art society "De Scalden". He was appointed director of the drawing academy of Temse in September 1896 and also taught drawing. He changed the way and content of the teaching and brought the school to a higher level.

As an etcher and graphic designer he provided his services to clubs and societies.

In 1899 he illustrated the Studentenliederboek ('Student song book') of Karel Heyndrickx and in 1910 a few children's stories for the author Lodewijk Scheltjens (1861–1946). In 1912 he took part in the design of the historic procession in Rupelmonde in honour of the 400th birthday of Mercator.

During the first world war he mainly painted country scenes with titles such as Potato peelers in an old age home, A sober meal, A thatch making place, The lace maker, A clog maker, A basket maker, The small quay (1917), A burned farm, A level crossing attendant, A weaver family, The spinning wheel, Piety on the heather, etc. His main subject were landscapes, mainly of forest views. He belonged to the neo-impressionistic school, and light played an important role in his works.

He also worked in the historic-Romantice genre, taking inspiration from the leading Romantic painter Henri Leys. Franz Courtens held Pieter Dierckx in high esteem. He recommended Dierckx for an important commission in the town of Lokeren: two paintings for the town hall showing historic events. The first one depicts the emperor Charles V handing over the privilege of holding a market every week to the deputies of the city in 1555. The other panel shows the foundation of the Saint Sebastian guild by Albrecht and Isabella in 1613, while issuing the privilege for holding a yearly market. These are big paintings, confirming the greatness of the school of Leys. In addition they show that Pieter Dierckx has the ability to expertly picture an historic event.

In March 1919 he returned to Antwerp and started a painting studio. In 1939 he confirmed himself as a painter of historic events with the almost 5 meter wide painting of "Saint Willibrordus explaining the bible to the people living on the shores of the river Scheld around 700 AD". This painting can be admired in the church of the Holy Heart in the Lange Beeldekensstraat 18 in Antwerp. He also painted mythological scenes such as The dancing sylphides and Orpheus, the soft voiced singer of Tracia. The latter painting showed the theme of the first one in the background. He was also in demand as a portrait painter.

Since 1952 the "Pieter Dierckx Price for Painting" is issued biannually at the drawing academy in Temse. In 1986 the town of Temse honoured Pieter Dierckx by naming a street after him.

== Exhibitions ==
- 1896: "XII Exhibition of the Art Society: "Eigen Vorming" in Borgerhout (Antwerp).
- 6 June 1897: "First Exhibition of De Scalden" at the art gallery Verlat, Antwerp.
- 25 March 1900: "Third Exhibition of Monumentals, Ornamentals and Applied Arts of De Scalden" at the Old - Museum in Antwerp.
- 1924: at the art gallery "Loquet" in Antwerp.
- 30 November 1925: at the art gallery "Jordaens" Korte Klarenstraat in Antwerp.
- February 1977: at the town hall of Temse on occasion of the 200th anniversary of the academy.
- From 24 June to 13 August 2006: retrospective at the museum of Temse.

== Salons ==
- Antwerp: 1901, 1904, 1908, 1911.
- Brussels: 1903.
- Liège: 1909.
- Ghent: 1913.
- Budapest, Munich, Florence (1907–1908), Paris.
- "Third Exhibition of 1911" at the Exhibition Hall, Meir in Antwerp.
- "Second Exhibition - December" organized by "The National Association of Painters and Sculptors of Belgium".

== Publications ==
- "Ons Volk ontwaakt" (23 August 1913).
- "Le Carnet Mondain" (7 December 1913).
- "Anvers Artistique" (15 April 1924).
- "La Revue Moderne illustrée et de la Vie" (15 May 1939), Paris.
- "Künstlerlexikon des XIX Jahrhunderts". Allgemeines Lexikon der bildeten Künstler des XX Jahrhunderts" published by Hans Vollmer (1953) - VEB Seeman Verlag Leipzig.
- "De Autotoerist" (4 February 1971), biweekly bulletin of the Flemish Motorist Association.
- The art book: "Parels langs de Scheldekant, deel II (1980), composed by Leo Busschaert, Waasmunster, Belgium.
- "Lexikon of the Belgian Romantic Painters" by W. Flippo (International Art Book Publishers, Antwerp 1981).
- "The Artist Dictionary Arto" (1999), composed by Wim Pas, published by De Gulden Roos.
- "Dictionnaire des peintres belges nés entre 1750 et 1875" (Editions Laconti Brussels, P&V Berko, Knokke).
- "Openbaar Kunstbezit" of the town Lokeren (Belgium), 31 May 2000.
- The newspapers: "Het Nieuwsblad“, "De Standaard“, "De Gentenaar“, "Het Volk" on the occasion of the retrospective at the museum of Temse (24 June – 13 August 2006).
- De belgische beeldende kunstenaars uit de 19de en 20ste eeuw (English: The Belgian Visual Artists of the 19th and 20th Centuries) by Paul Piron, published by Art in Belgium.
- "Belgian Artists Signatures: Signatures of Belgian Artists of the XIX and XX Century" by Paul Piron, published by Arts, Antiques, Auctions.
