= François-Antoine Bossuet =

Belgian painter (1798–1889)

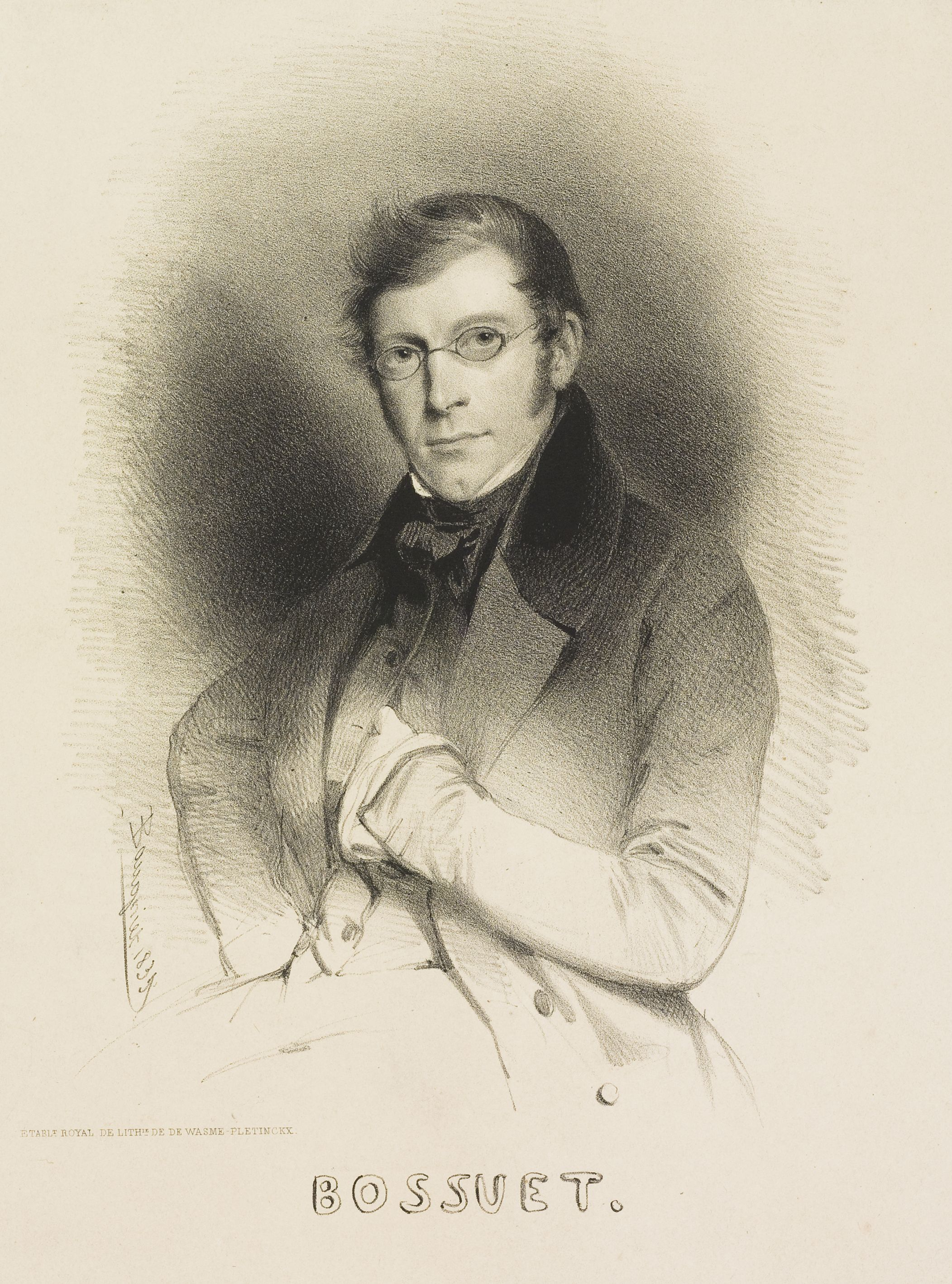
François-Antoine Bossuet

François-Antoine Bossuet (21 August 1798 Ypres – 28 September 1889 Saint-Josse-ten-Noode) was a painter and draughtsman of the Belgian school.

== Life and work ==
Bossuet is known for his depictions of the landscapes, cities and monuments of Spain and Italy, with an emphasis on historic places, occasionally with genre scenes of everyday life. He is noted for the excellence of perspective in his paintings, on which he wrote a dissertation in 1843.

His fascination with Spain and Italy stemmed from what had become something of a tradition for romantic European painters. Accordingly, he visited Andalusía and saw its important buildings like the Alhambra of Granada.

He was professor at the Academy of Fine Arts in Brussels, from 1855 until 1876. His works may be seen in the Royal Museum of Fine Arts, Antwerp, the Royal Museums of Fine Arts of Belgium in Brussels, and the Victoria and Albert Museum in London.

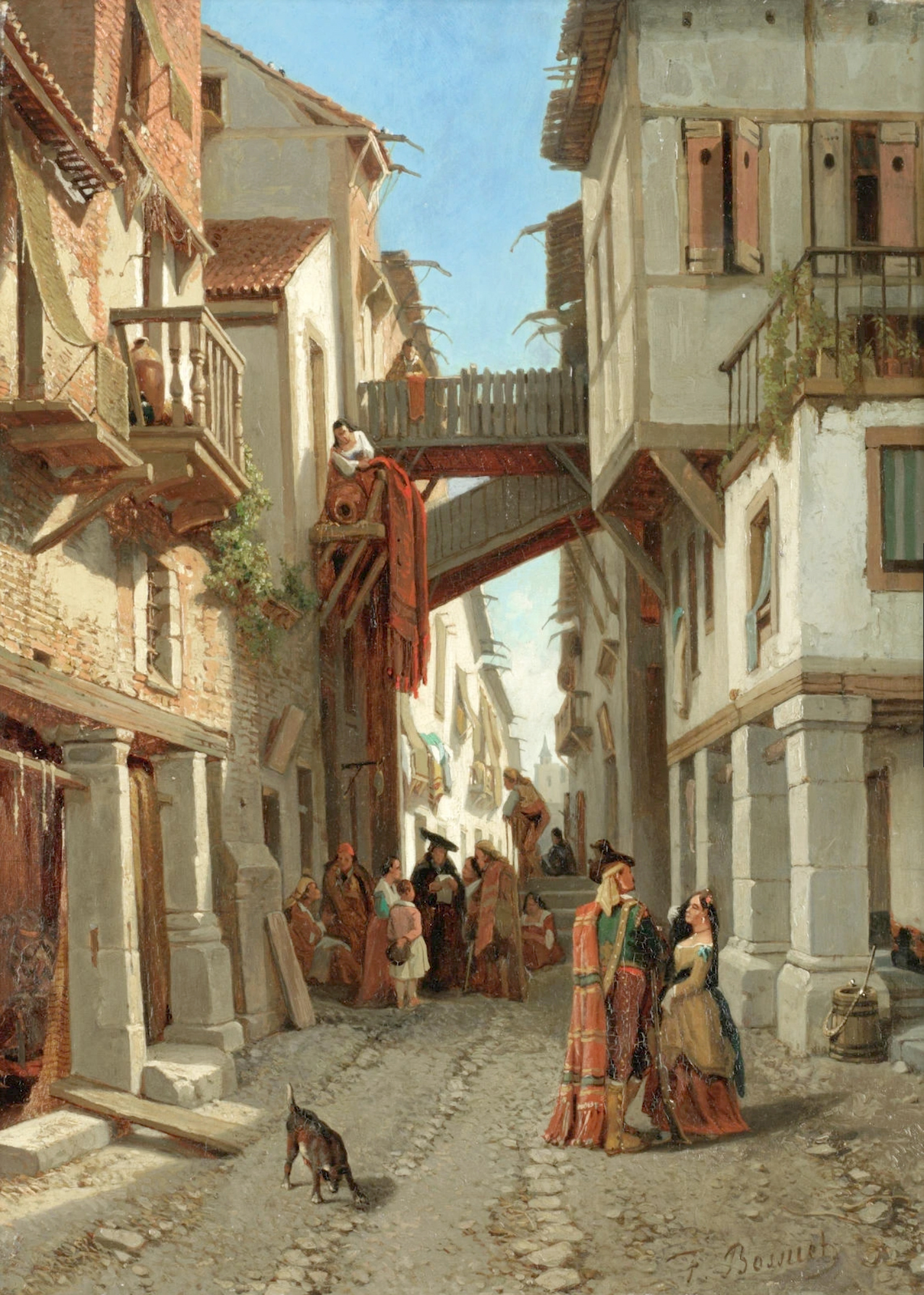
Street Scene in Toledo

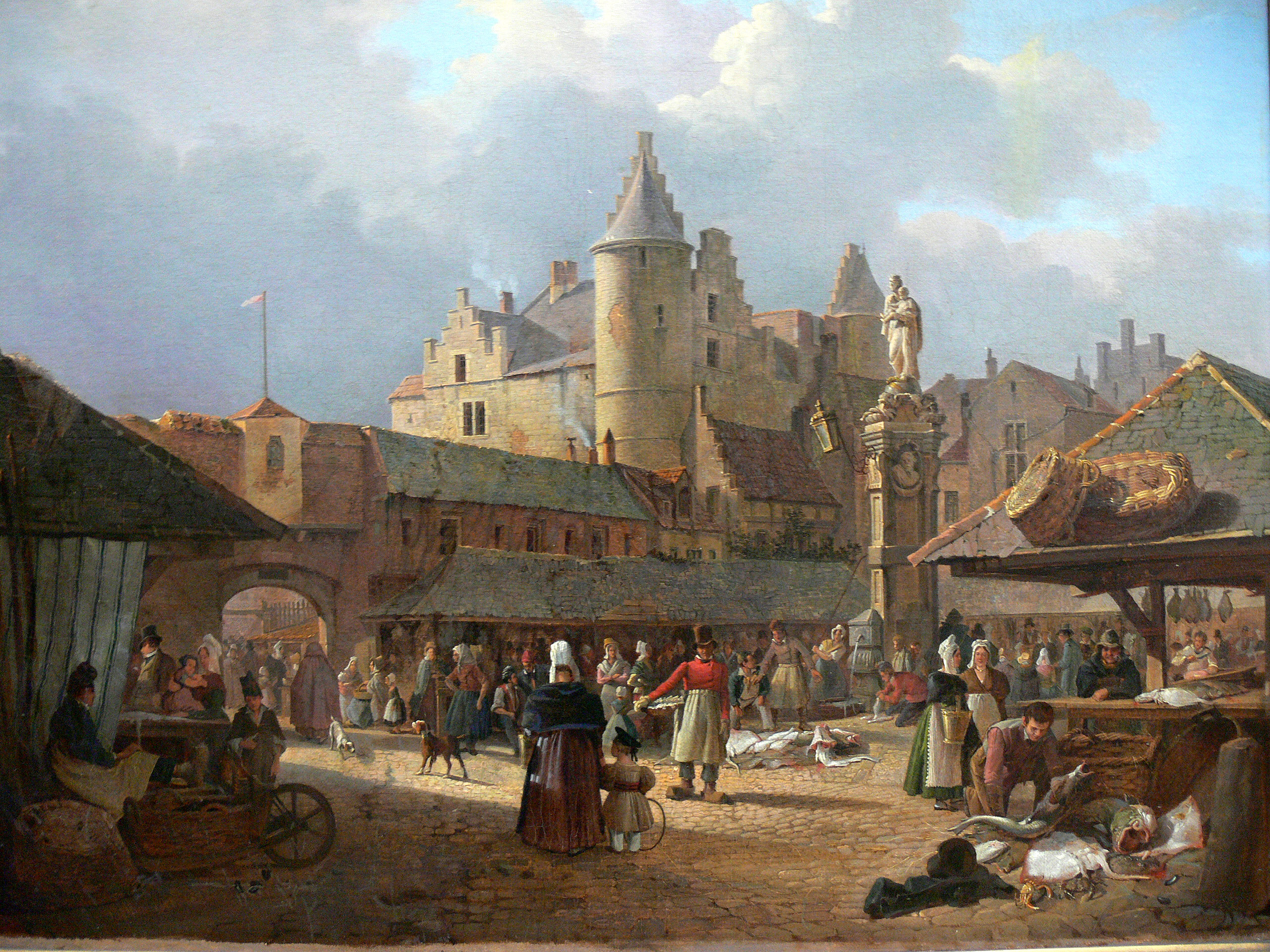
Fish market

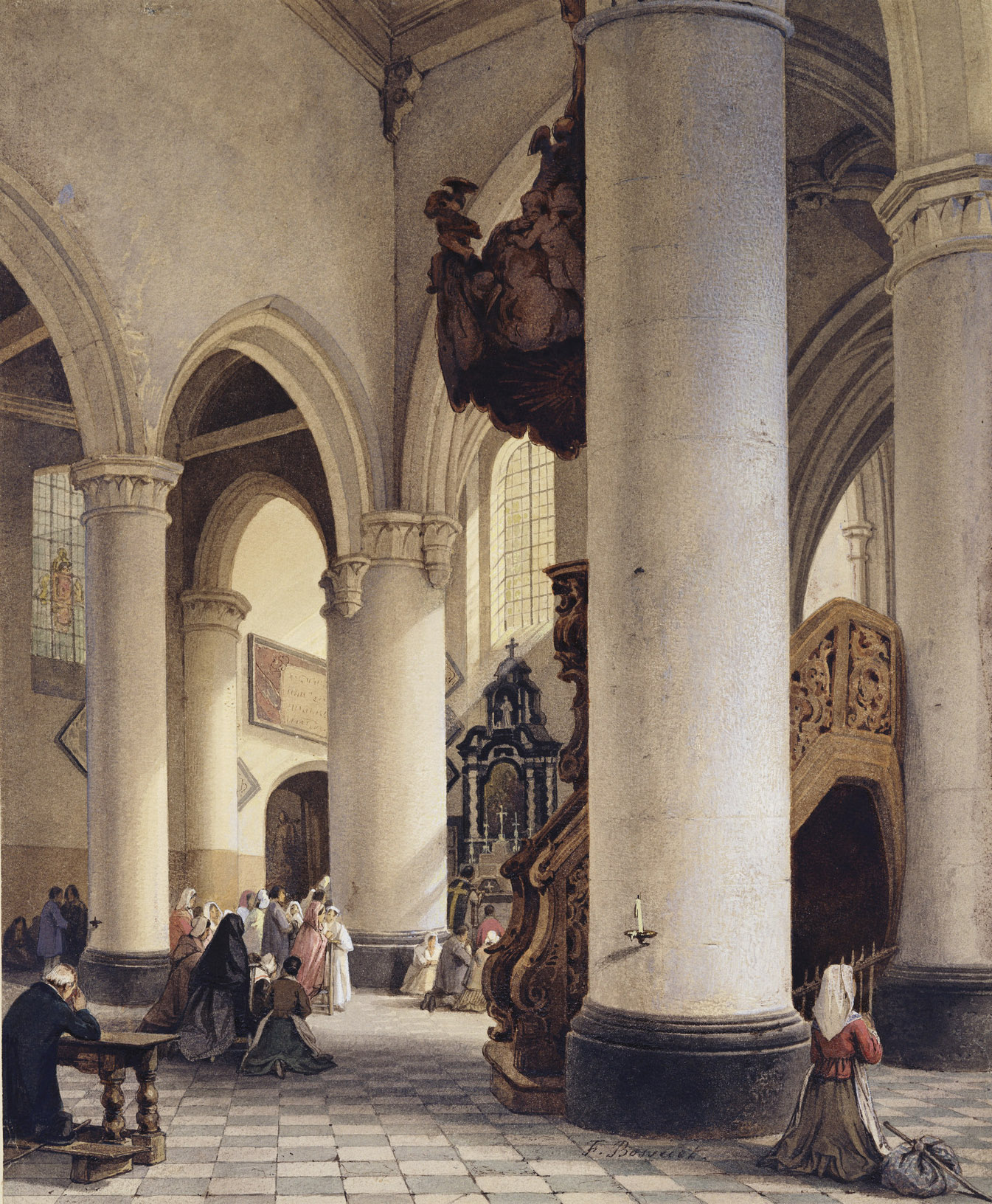
Laeken
