= Henri de Braekeleer =

Belgian painter (1840–1888)

'Henri de Braekeleer
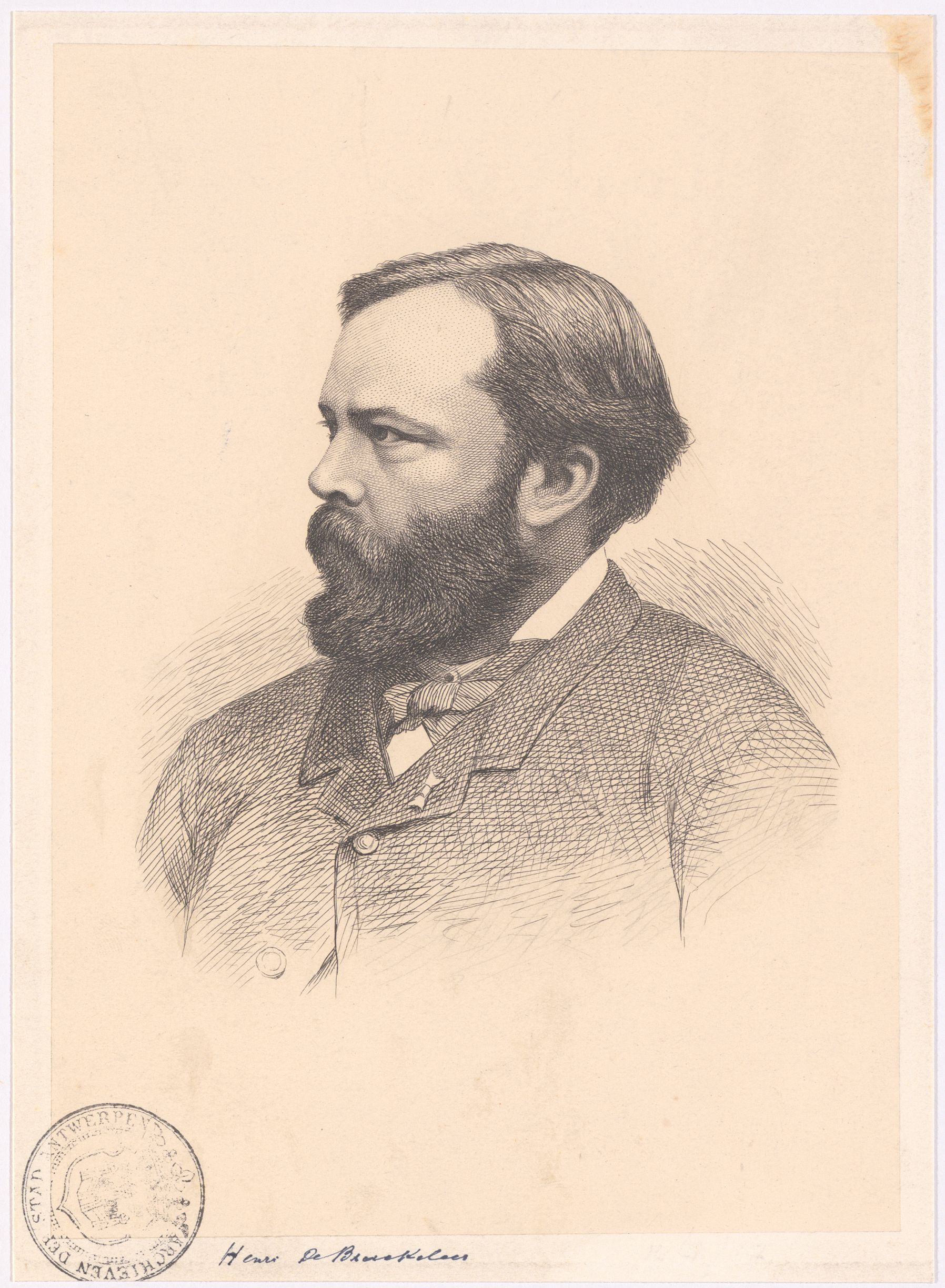
- Self portrait
- Born: Henri Jean Augustin de Braekeleer; 11 June 1840; Antwerp, Belgium
- Died: 20 June 1888 (aged 48); Antwerp, Belgium
- Education: Royal Academy of Fine Arts (Antwerp)
- Occupation: Painter
- Parent: Ferdinand de Braekeleer (father)
- Relatives: Jan August Hendrik Leys (uncle)

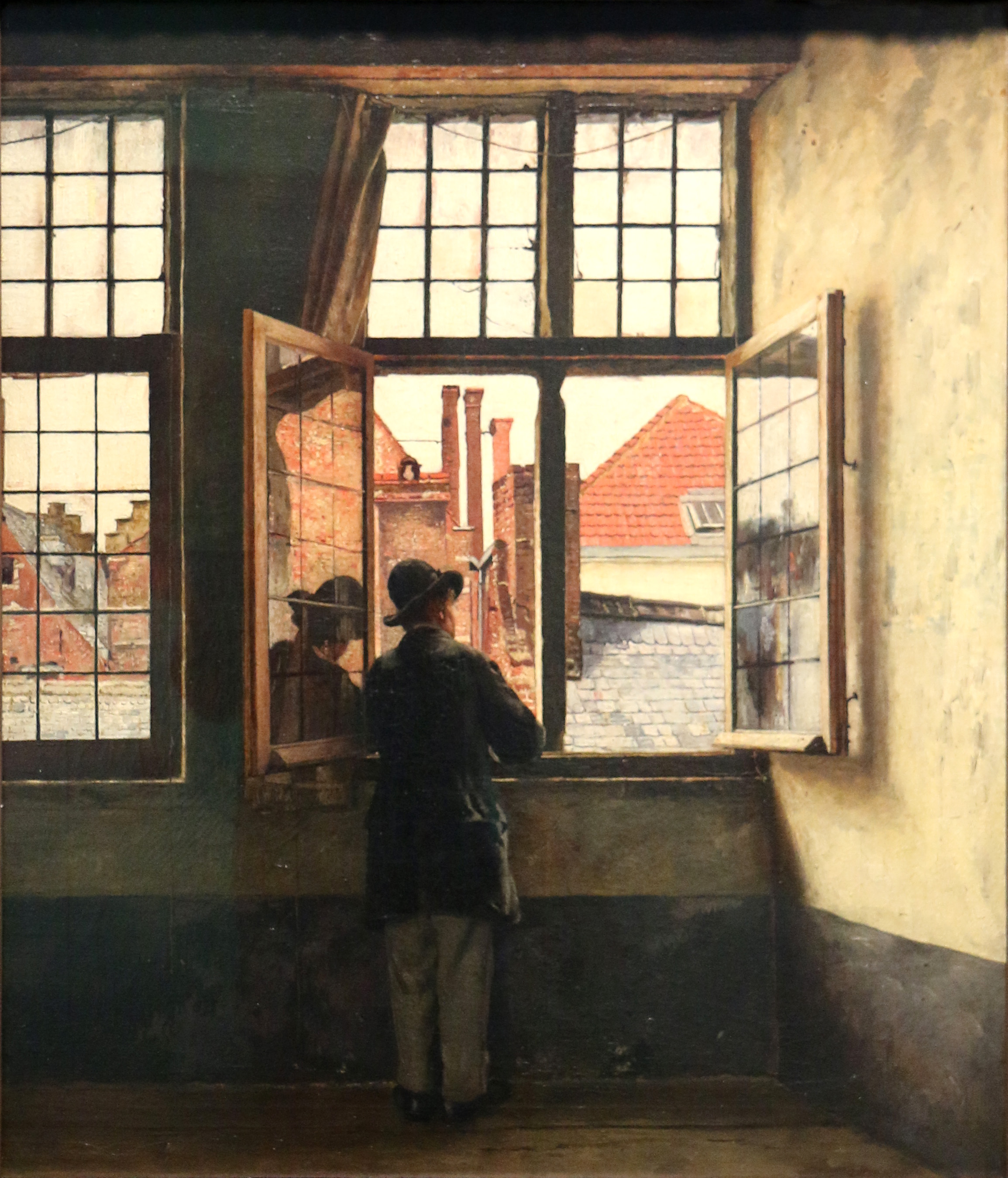
Braekeleer-L'homme à la fenêtre

Henri Jean Augustin de Braekeleer (11 June 1840 – 20 July 1888) was a Belgian painter. He was born and died in Antwerp. He was trained in drawing by his father Ferdinand de Braekeleer, a well-known genre painter, and his uncle Jan August Hendrik Leys. Braekeleer entered the Royal Academy of Fine Arts (Antwerp) in 1854. Although he remained a student there until 1861, he publicly exhibited his paintings for the first time in 1858, when Reaper and Washerwoman (locations unknown) were shown at the Antwerp Salon. In 1863, he went to Germany and, in 1864, to the Netherlands, studying works by 16th- and 17th-century painters in both countries. The influence of Johannes Vermeer was especially important, seen in one of de Braekeleer's most characteristic subjects: a single person absorbed in a quiet activity, shown in an interior lit by a window.

In 1869, de Braekeleer signed a contract with the Belgian art dealer, Gustave Coûteaux, a relationship that continued until 1876. In the same year, his uncle Baron Leys died. The two events combined to create the most productive period in de Braekeleer's career, when he made the works for which he is best known and received public recognition for them. In 1872, he received a gold medal at the Salon in Brussels for The Geographer and The Lesson and, in 1873, a gold medal at the International Exhibition in Vienna for The Painter's Studio and Grandmother's Birthday Celebration (all in the Royal Museum of Fine Arts, Brussels). However, apparently because of depression, he seems to have stopped painting between 1879 and 1881. When he started to work again, he used a shorter and more visible brushstroke, perhaps as a result of the influence of the Impressionists. Vincent van Gogh mentioned de Braekeleer in letters to his brother Theo several times, referring to him as an artist he liked as well as one afflicted by mental illness.

== Sources ==
- Baetens, Jan Dirk (March 2010). "Vanguard Economics, Rearguard Art: Gustave Coûteaux and the Modernist Myth of the Dealer-Critic System". Oxford Art Journal. 33 (1): 25–41. doi:10.1093/oxartj/kcq001.
- Van Gogh, Vincent. The Letters. Amsterdam: The Van Gogh Museum. angoghletters.org
- Vautier, Dominique. "Henri (Jean-Augustin) De Braekeleer" in Oxford Art Online.
