= Eugène Van Bemmel =

Belgian author and educator

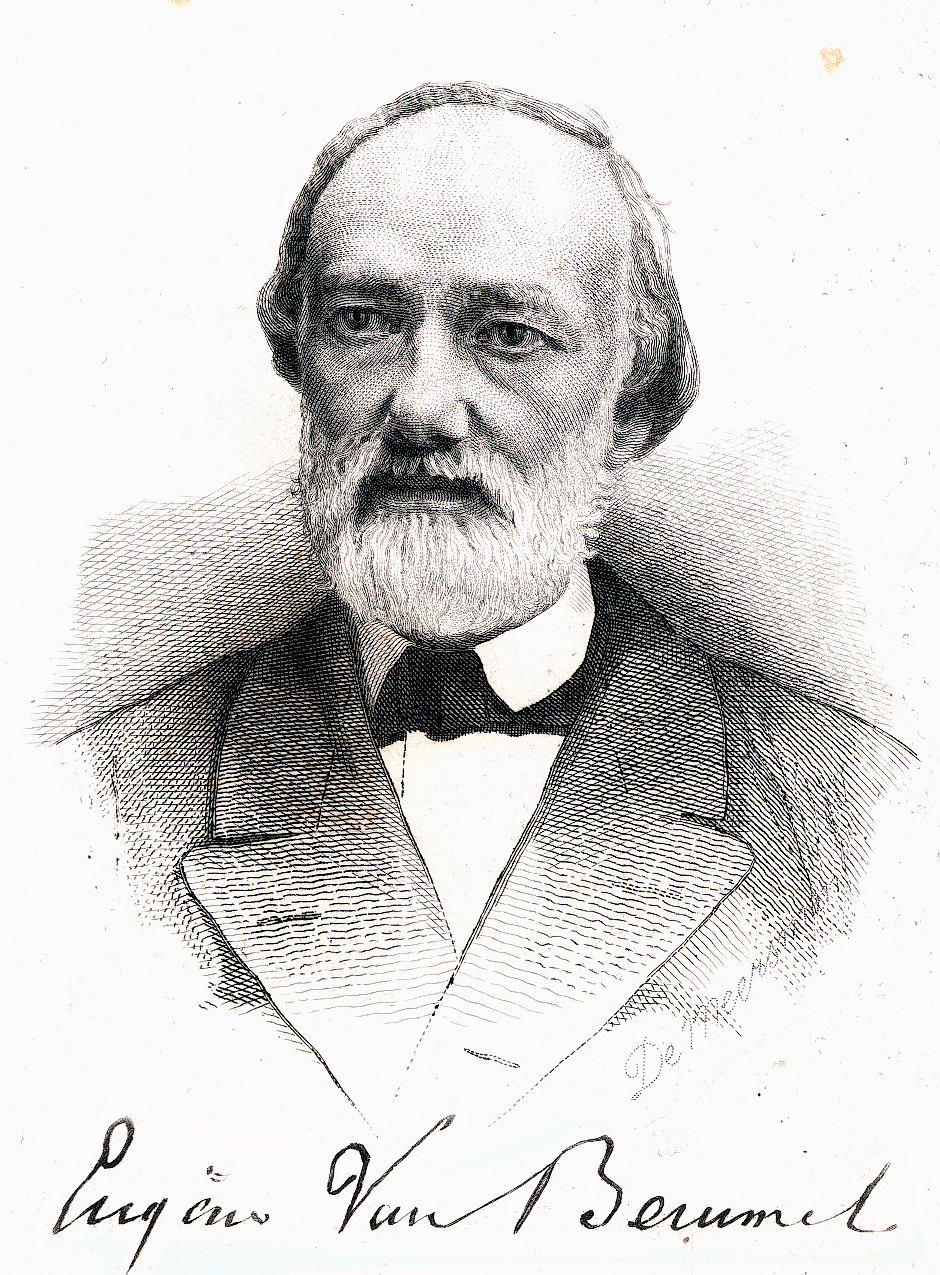
- Portret of Eugène Van Bemmel by François De Meersman
- Born: 1824; Ghent
- Died: 1880 (aged 55–56); Saint-Josse-ten-Noode
- Occupations: author, educator

Baron Eugène Van Bemmel (1824–1880) was a Belgian writer and educator, born at Ghent, United Kingdom of the Netherlands. He studied law, but turned to literature. In 1849 he was called to the chair of French literature at the University of Brussels. He was secretary of the Society of Belgian Authors and first director of the Revue Trimestrielle, which he founded in 1854 and which in 1864 became the Revue de Belgique.

== Publications ==
Van Bemmel published:

- De la langue et de la poésie provençales (1846)
- Voyage à travers champs: la province de Luxembourg (1849)
- L'harmonie des passions humaines (1854)
- La Belgique illustrée (1855)
- Etude sur le monuments druidiques (1857)
- Histoire de Saint Josse-ten-Noode (1869)
- L'Ourthe et L'Amblève pittoresques (1873)
- Patria Belgica (1871–75)
- Dom Placide: mémoires du dernier moine de l'Abbaye de Villers (1876), a novel
- Histoire de Belgique empruntée textuellement au récits des écrivains contemporains (1880)
