= 1877 in Belgium =

- Decades: 1850s; 1860s; 1870s; 1880s; 1890s
- See also: Other events of 1877; List of years in Belgium

Events in the year 1877 in Belgium.

== Incumbents ==
Monarch: Leopold II
Head of government: Jules Malou

== Events ==
- Musical Instrument Museum established in the Royal Conservatory of Brussels
- Plantin-Moretus Museum established in Antwerp
- 16 January – Extradition agreement with the Netherlands signed in Brussels.
- 14 March – Trade agreement with Romania signed in Brussels.
- 9 July – Law on secret ballot introduces use of voting booths at Belgian polling stations.
- 19 August – Plantin-Moretus Museum opens to the public.

== Publications ==
Georges Eekhoud, Myrtes & Cyprès (1877)

Periodicals

- Annuaire de l'Académie royale de Belgique, 43 (Brussels, F. Hayez)
- Bulletins de l'Académie royale des sciences, des lettres et des beaux-arts de Belgique, 46 (Brussels, F. Hayez).
- Moniteur belge.
- Recueil consulaire, 23 (Brussels, C. Torfs)
- Recueil des lois et arrêtés royaux de la Belgique, 48 (Brussels, Bruylant-Christophe)
- Revue de Belgique, 25-26.
- Revue de l'instruction publique en Belgique, 20 (Ghent, Eug. Vanderhaeghen)
- Revue de l'horticulture belge et étrangère, 3.

Other

- Georges Eekhoud, Myrtes & Cyprès.

== Art and architecture ==
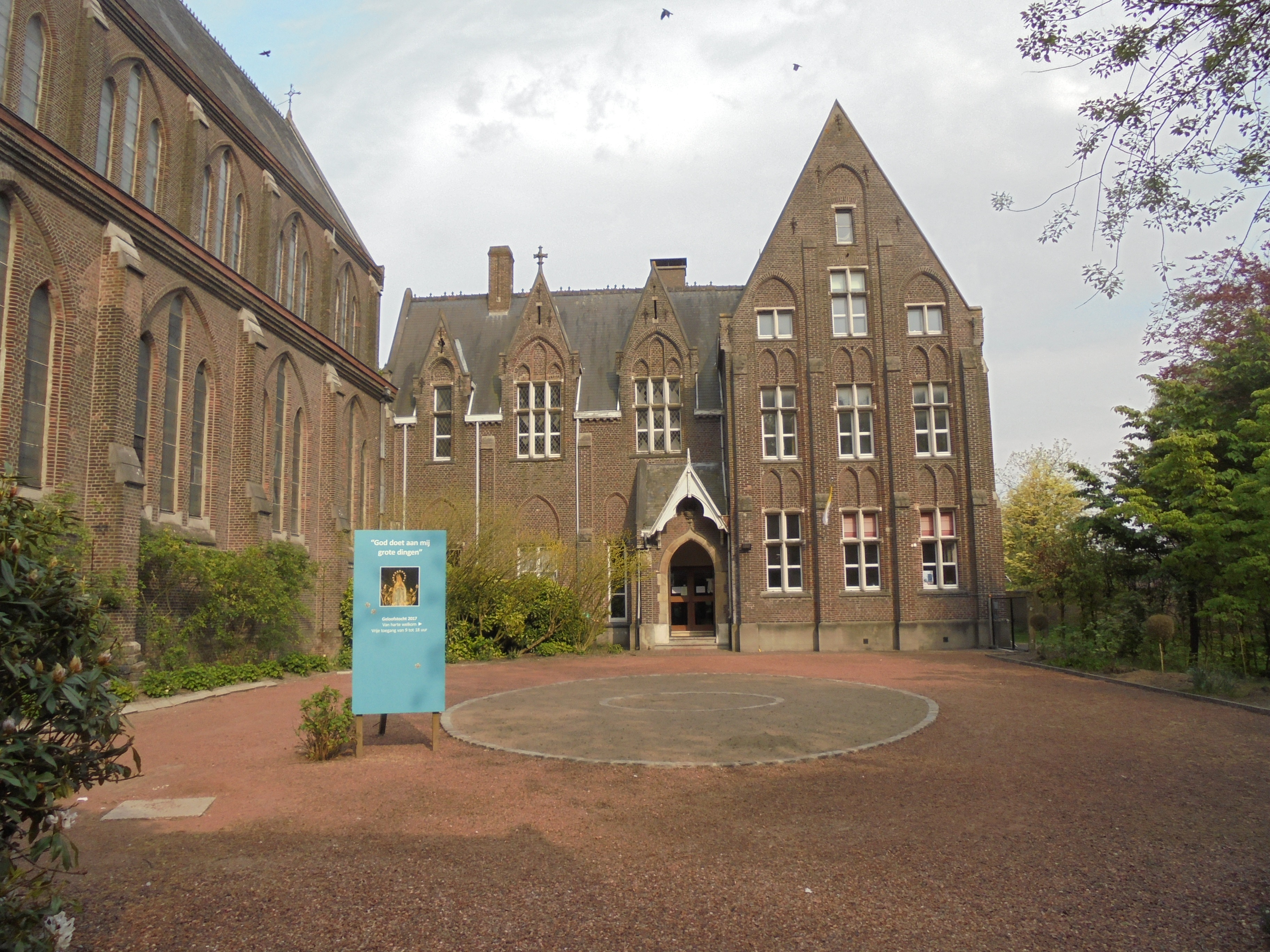
Jesuit house in Oostakker (completed 1877)

Buildings

- E. Van Hoecke-Peeters, Jesuit house in Oostakker

Paintings

- Léon Herbo, portrait of the sculptor Julien Dillens, winner of the 1877 Prix de Rome
- Louis Tytgadt, Readers of the "Gazette van Gent"

== Science ==
- Louis Melsens becomes the second person to receive the Guinard Prize by the Brussels Academy, a Belgian award, given every 5 years since 1872, to the scientist who has written the best work or created the best invention to improve the material or intellectual position of the working class.

== Births ==
- 9 January – Joseph Mansion, philologist (died 1937)
- 24 January – Louise van den Plas, feminist (died 1968)
- 21 February – Jean Capart, Egyptologist (died 1947)
- 11 March – Alfred Loewenstein, financier (died 1928)
- 3 July – Marthe de Kerchove de Denterghem, feminist (died 1956)
- 10 July – Hélène Dutrieu, cyclist and aviator (died 1961)
- 14 July – Marie Alexandrine Becker, poisoner (died 1942)
- 11 August – Aloïs Catteau, cyclist (died 1939)
- 10 September – Henri Denis, general (died 1957)
- 26 September – Bertha De Vriese, physician (died 1958)
- 6 October – Oscar Taelman, Olympic rower (died 1945)
- 10 November – Marie-Georges-Gérard-Léon le Maire de Warzée d'Hermalle, diplomat (died 1931)

== Deaths ==
- 1 January – Adolf Alexander Dillens (born 1821), painter
- 3 April – Jean-Baptiste Madou (born 1796), artist
- 16 April – Auguste Payen (born 1801), architect
- 2 June – Eugène Prévinaire (born 1805), civil servant and banker
- 3 June – Camille de Briey (born 1800), diplomat
- November – Louis-Pierre Verwee (born 1807), painter
- 7 November – Henri Guillaume (born 1812), general
