= 1882 in Belgium =

- Decades: 1860s; 1870s; 1880s; 1890s; 1900s
- See also: Other events of 1882; List of years in Belgium

The following lists events that happened during 1882 in the Kingdom of Belgium.

== Incumbents ==
- Monarch: Leopold II
- Prime Minister:Walthère Frère-Orban

== Events ==
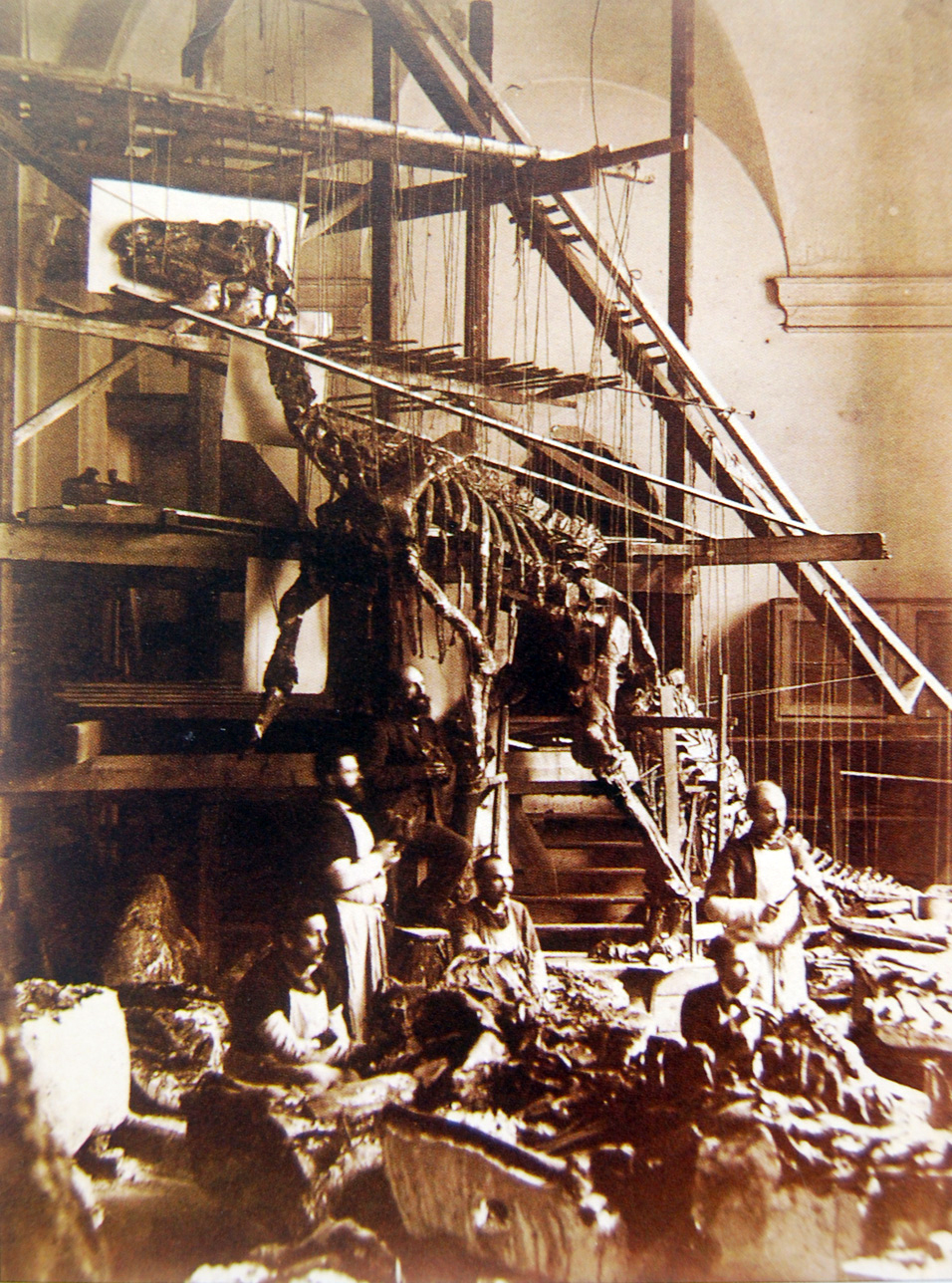
Mounted Iguanodon skeleton (1882)

- Louis Dollo reconstructs the iguanodons found in Bernissart.
- 7 January – Léon and Armand Peltzer murder Guillaume Bernays at 159 Rue de la Loi, Brussels (the Peltzer Case).
- 6 May – North Sea Fisheries Convention signed, to come into effect in 1884.
- 22 May – Provincial elections
- 13 June – Legislative elections
- 31 July – Désiré-Joseph Mercier appointed to the new chair in Thomist philosophy at the Catholic University of Louvain.
- 27 November – The Peltzer Case comes to trial before the Brussels Court of assizes.
- December – Jean-Charles Houzeau leads a scientific expedition to San Antonio, Texas, to observe a transit of Venus in order to determine the solar parallax.

== Publications ==
Periodicals

- Bulletins de l'Acadie royale des sciences, des lettres et des beaux-arts de Belgique, 3rd series, vol. 4

Conference proceedings

- Congrès international de l'enseignement, Bruxelles, 1880: Discussions (Brussels, Librairie de l'Office de Publicité)

== Art and architecture ==
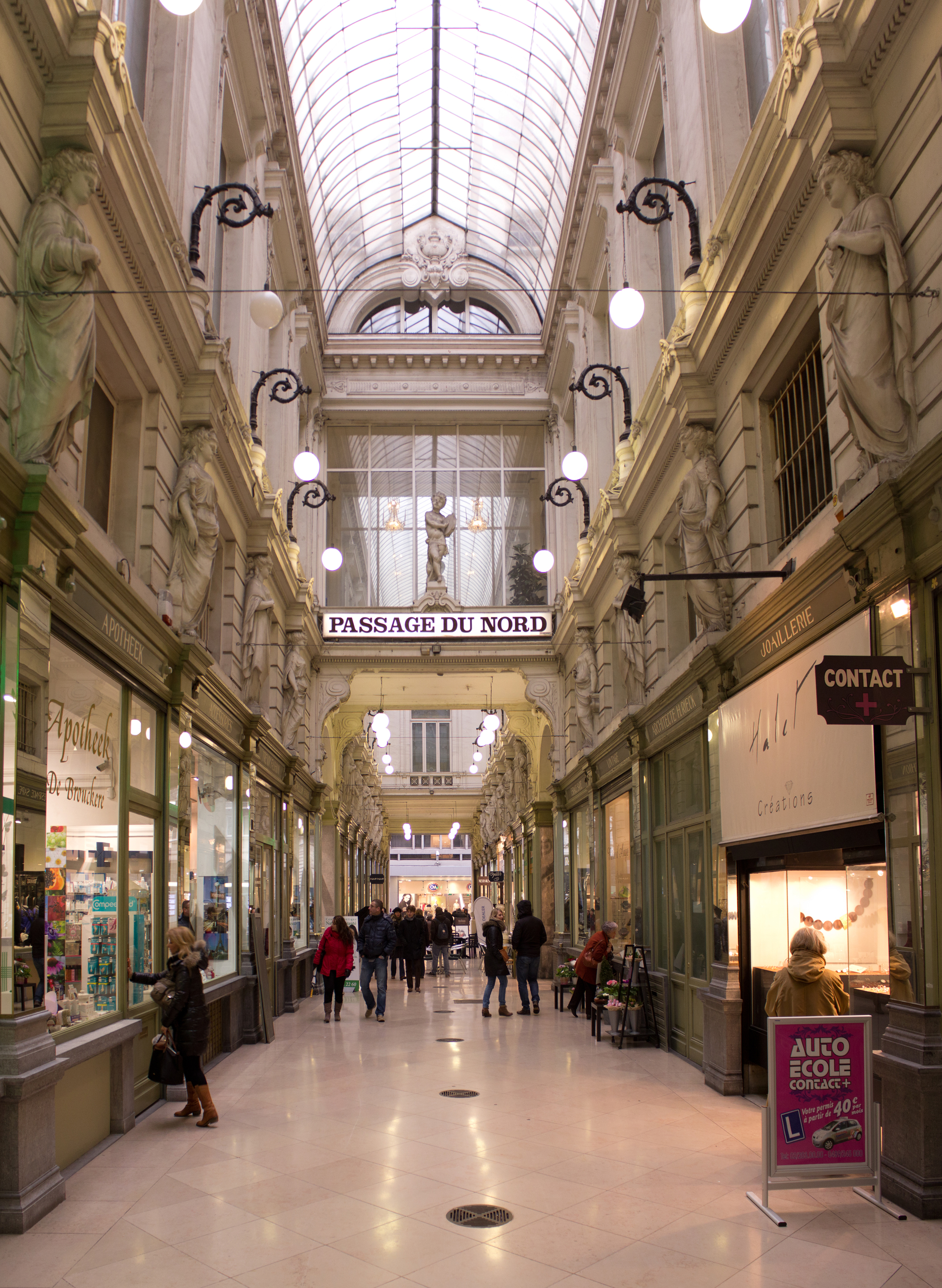
Passage du Nord, Brussels (opened 1882)

Buildings

- Henri Rieck's Northern Gallery opens in Brussels
- 1 July – Last stone laid of Palais de Justice, Brussels (formally opened 1883)

== Births ==
- 10 January – Eugène Joseph Delporte, astronomer (died 1955)
- 5 February – Georges Dandoy, missionary (died 1962)
- 1 April – Paul Anspach, fencer (died 1981)
- 16 June – Josef Christiaens, driver and aviator (died 1919)
- 10 July – Henri Anspach, fencer (died 1979)
- 15 July – Albert Hustin, doctor (died 1967)
- 2 September – Nico Gunzburg, criminologist (died 1984)
- 19 October – Norbert Wallez, newspaper editor (died 1952)

== Deaths ==
- 7 February – Édouard De Bièfve (born 1808), painter
- 9 July – Louis-Charles Verwee (born 1832), painter
- 25 September – Désiré van Monckhoven (born 1834), photographer
- 17 November – Henri Julien Allard (born 1803), politician
