= 1881 in Belgium =

- Decades: 1860s; 1870s; 1880s; 1890s; 1900s
- See also: Other events of 1881; List of years in Belgium

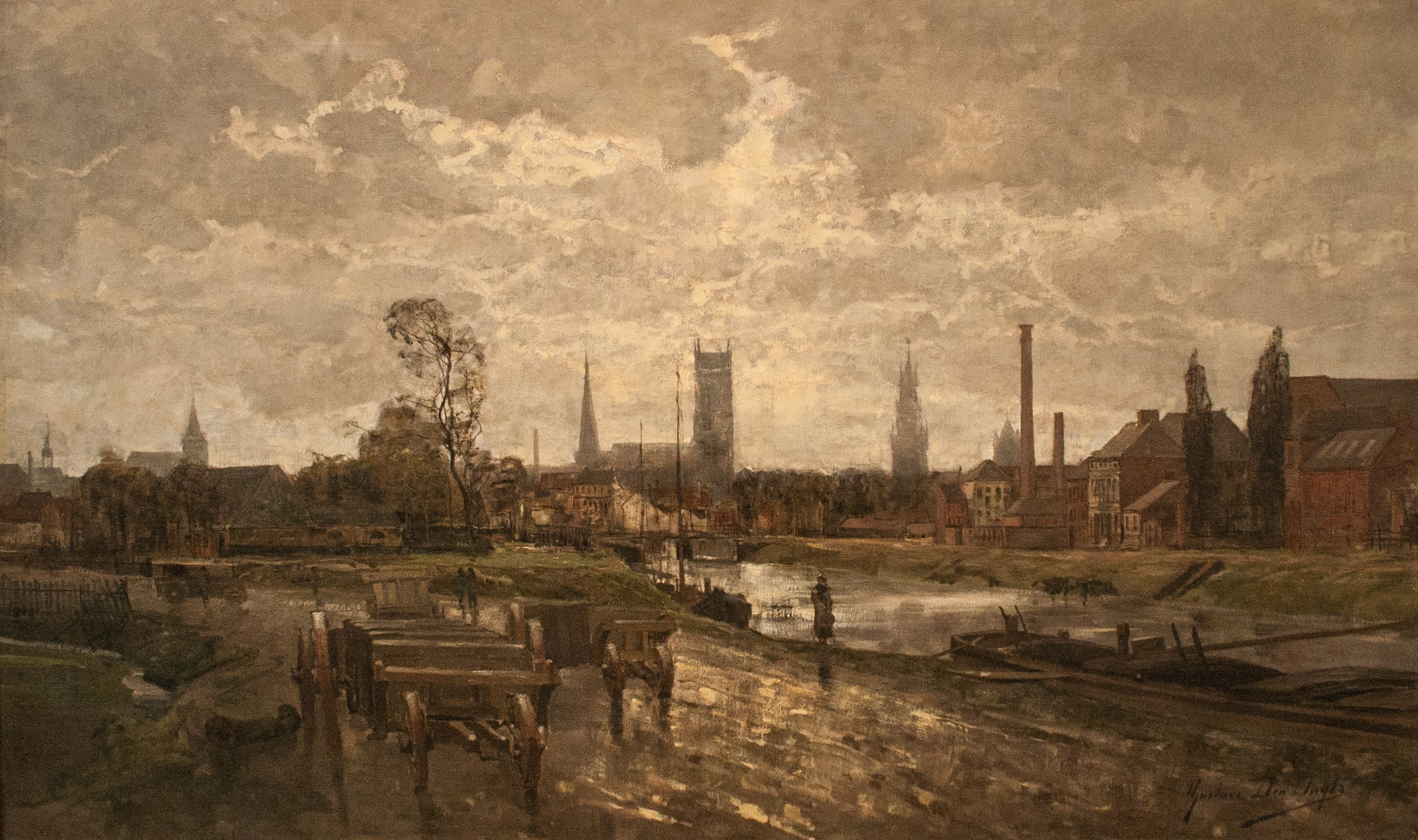
Gustave Den Duyts, Panoramic View of Ghent (c. 1881)

The following lists events that happened during 1881 in the Kingdom of Belgium.

== Incumbents ==
- Monarch: Leopold II
- Prime Minister:Walthère Frère-Orban

== Events ==
- 10 May – Princess Stéphanie of Belgium marries Rudolf, Crown Prince of Austria, in the Augustinian Church, Vienna.
- 8 September – Isidore-Joseph du Rousseaux performs the canonical coronation of Our Lady of Tongre in Chièvres, mandated in a papal brief of Pope Leo XIII.

== Publications ==
Periodicals

- L'Art Moderne begins publication.

Books

- Exposition de l'art ancien au Pays de Liège: Catalogue officiel (Liège, L. Grandmont-Donders)
- A Handbook for Travellers in Holland and Belgium (London, John Murray).
- Alfred Giron, Le droit administratif de la Belgique (Brussels, Bruylant-Christophe)
- Charles-Joseph de Harlez de Deulin, Védisme, brahmanisme et christianisme (Brussels)
- François Nizet, Voyage de Bruxelles à Aix-la-Chapelle: Excursions de Sa Majesté la Reine des Belges (Brussels)

== Art and architecture ==
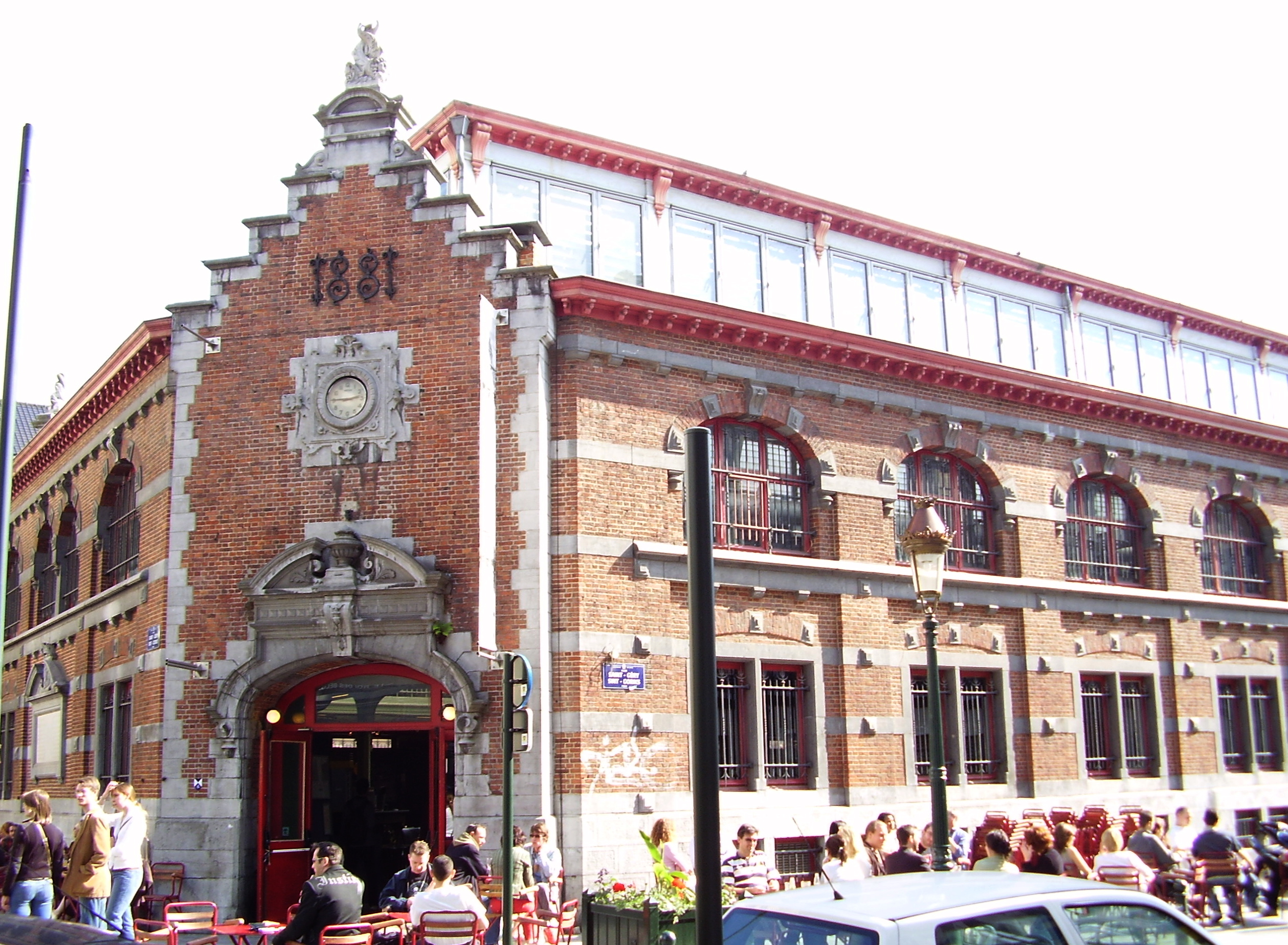
Halles Saint-Géry in Brussels

Karel De Kesel, Bather (1881), Museum of Fine Arts, Ghent

Buildings

- Adolphe Vanderheggen, Halles Saint-Géry (Brussels)

Paintings

- Karel De Kesel, Bather
- Gustave Den Duyts, Panoramic View of Ghent (c. 1881)

== Births ==
- 15 January – Maurice Corneil de Thoran, musician (died 1953)
- 6 February – Huib Hoste, architect (died 1957)
- 28 February – Geo Verbanck, sculptor (died 1961)
- 17 March – Raoul Daufresne de la Chevalerie, sportsman and soldier (died 1967)
- 12 March – Henri Grégoire, scholar and translator (died 1964)
- 12 April – François Poels, trade unionist (died 1926)
- 28 July – Léon Spilliaert, artist (died 1946)

== Deaths ==
- 6 June – Henri Vieuxtemps (born 1820), composer
- 27 July – François-Joseph Scohy (born 1831), archaeologist
- 7 November – Auguste Vander Meersch (born 1810), biographer
- 12 November – Jan Michiel Ruyten (born 1813), artist
- 28 December – André-Eugène Pirson (born 1817), banker and politician
