= 1883 in Belgium =

- Decades: 1860s; 1870s; 1880s; 1890s; 1900s
- See also: Other events of 1883; List of years in Belgium

The following lists events that happened during 1883 in the Kingdom of Belgium.

== Incumbents ==
- Monarch: Leopold II
- Prime Minister: Walthère Frère-Orban

== Events ==
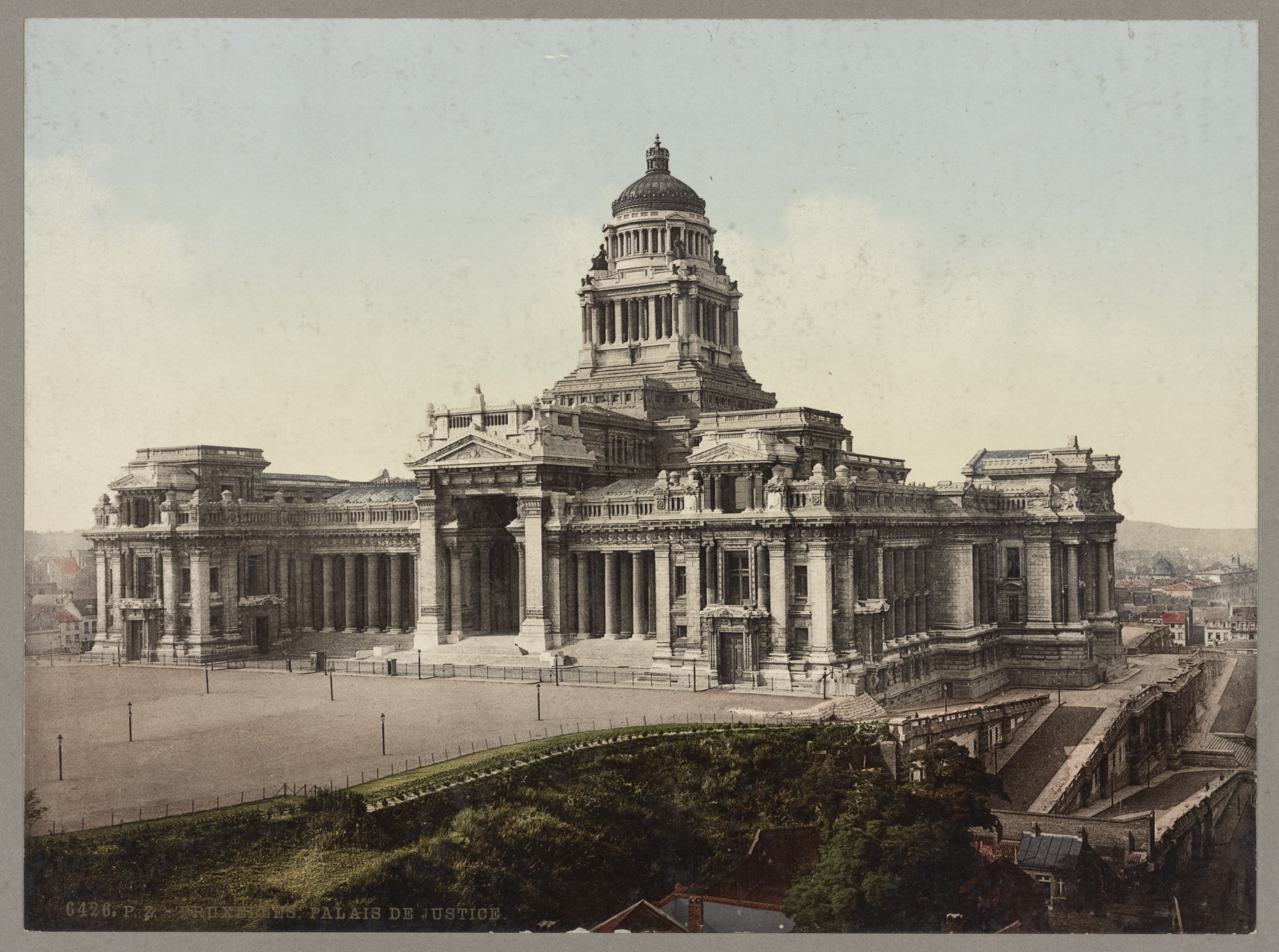
Palais de Justice, Brussels (inaugurated 15 October 1883)

- 20 March – Belgium a signatory to the Paris Convention for the Protection of Industrial Property.
- 5 to 10 June – Third International Eucharistic Congress held in Liège, with over 10,000 in attendance.
- 15 October – Inauguration of Palais de Justice, Brussels.
- 28 October – Founding meeting of the art association Les XX.
- 6 December – Steamer Plantyn abandoned in the North Atlantic after being damaged in a storm.

== Publications ==
- Frans Jozef Peter van den Branden, Geschiedenis der Antwerpsche Schilder-school.
- Émile Verhaeren, Les Flamandes

== Art and architecture ==
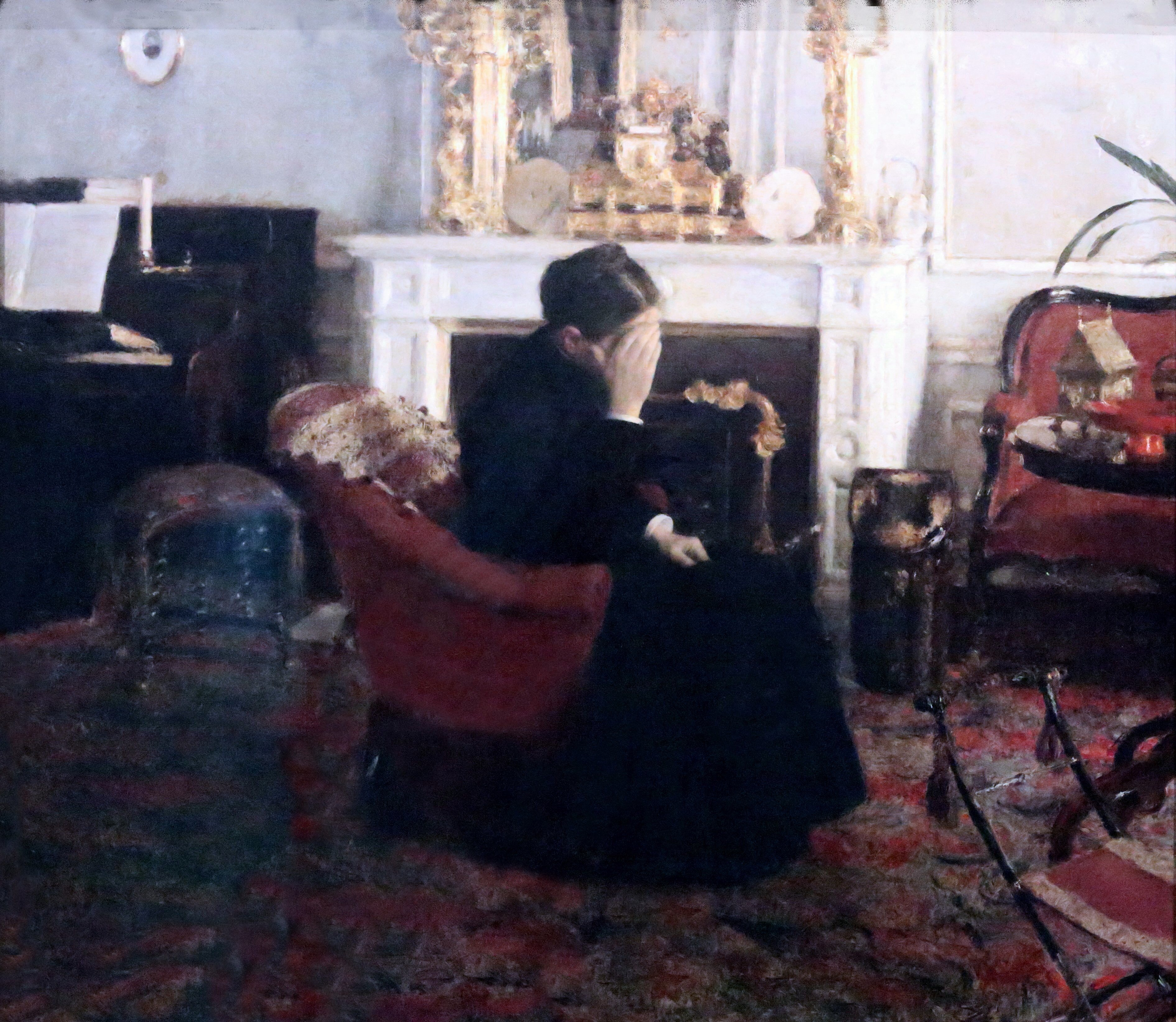
Fernand Khnopff, Listening to Schumann (1883)

Paintings

- Fernand Khnopff, Listening to Schumann; Portrait de Mademoiselle Van der Hecht

Buildings

- Joseph Poelaert, Palais de Justice, Brussels

== Births ==
- 18 February – Jacques Ochs, artist and fencer (died 1971)
- 21 March – Jules Van Nuffel, priest and musicologist (died 1953)
- 1 April – Albert-Édouard Janssen, banker (died 1966)
- 3 April – Frits Van den Berghe, painter (died 1939)
- 22 April – Joseph Jacquemotte, anarcho-syndicalist (died 1936)
- 13 May – Caroline Lacroix, royal mistress (died 1948)
- 24 June – Arthur Devère, film actor (died 1961)
- 29 June – Fernand Bosmans, fencer (died 1960)
- 3 July – Pierre Charles (Jesuit) (died 1954)
- 25 July – Félix de Roy, astronomer (died 1942)
- 27 July – Fernand Verhaegen, artist (died 1975)
- 2 September – Archduchess Elisabeth Marie of Austria (died 1963)
- 4 September – Karel Candael, composer (died 1948)
- 8 September – Théodore Pilette, racing driver (died 1921)
- 12 December – Leon van der Essen, historian (died 1963)
- 16 December – Cyrille van Hauwaert, cyclist (died 1974)
- 23 December – Hubert Pierlot, politician (died 1963)
- 30 December – Marie Gevers, novelist (died 1975)

== Deaths ==
- 5 February – Jonathan-Raphaël Bischoffsheim (born 1808), banker
- 1 May – Octave Pirmez (born 1832), author
- 16 May – Ferdinand de Braekeleer the Elder (born 1792), painter
- 15 September – Joseph Plateau (born 1801), mathematician
- 29 November – Elisabeth Dieudonné Vincent (born 1798), Haitian-born businesswoman
- 3 December – André Jolly (born 1799), politician
