= 1878 in Belgium =

- Decades: 1850s; 1860s; 1870s; 1880s; 1890s
- See also: Other events of 1878; List of years in Belgium

The following lists events that happened during 1878 in the Kingdom of Belgium.

== Incumbents ==
- Monarch: Leopold II
- Prime Minister: Jules Malou (to 19 June); Walthère Frère-Orban (from 19 June)

== Events ==
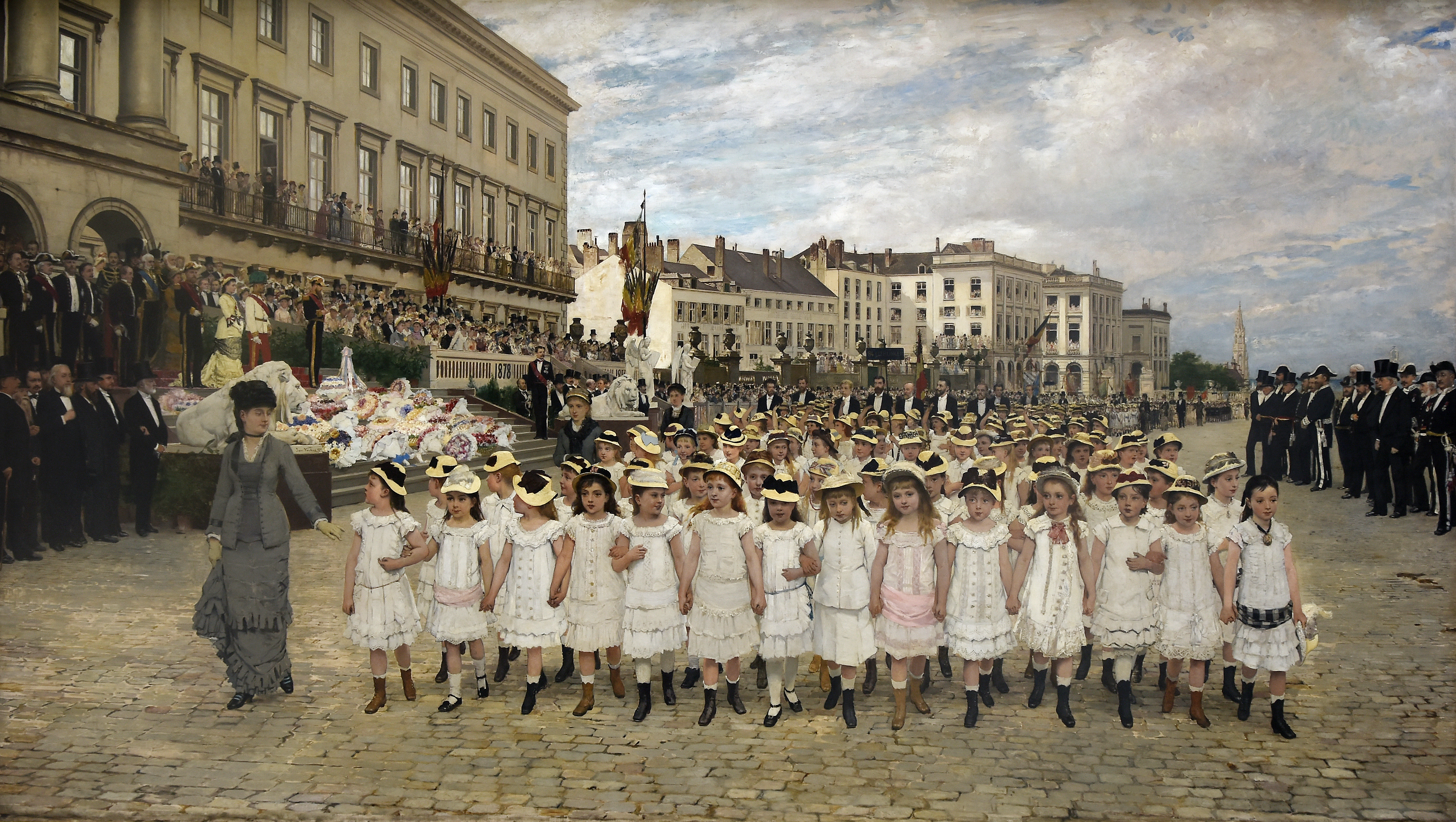
Jan Verhas, The Parade of the Schools in 1878 (1880)

- May to November – Belgium participates in the Paris Universal Exhibition.
- 27 May – Provincial elections
- 11-18 June – Partial legislative elections of 1878 (first with voting booths to ensure a secret ballot)
- 19 June – Walthère Frère-Orban replaces Jules Malou as Prime Minister
- 22-25 August – Twenty-fifth wedding anniversary celebrations of King Leopold II and Queen Marie-Henriette, including a parade of 23,000 school children on 23 August.
- 13 November – Jules Guillery succeeds as Charles Rogier as Speaker of the Chamber of Representatives

== Publications ==
Periodicals

- Almanach de Poche de Bruxelles (Brussels, H. Manceaux)
- Annuaire de l'Observatoire royal de Bruxelles, 46 (Brussels, F. Hayez)
- Annuaire du Conservatoire Royal de Musique de Bruxelles, 2 (Brussels, Librairie Européenne C. Muquardt)
- Bulletin de la Société belge de géographie, 2 (Brussels, Secrétariat de la Société Belge de Géographie)
- Bulletins de l'Académie royale des sciences, des lettres et des beaux-arts de Belgique, 47 (Brussels, M. Hayez).
- Le Moniteur Belge.
- Revue de l'horticulture belge et étrangère (Ghent, Bureaux de la Revue)
- Revue du notariat belge, 4 (Brussels, Bureau de la Revue)

Books

- Hendrik Conscience, De Schat van Felix Roobeek
- Henri Guillaume, Histoire de l'infanterie wallonne sous la maison d'Espagne, 1500–1800 (Brussels, Académie Royale)

== Art and architecture ==
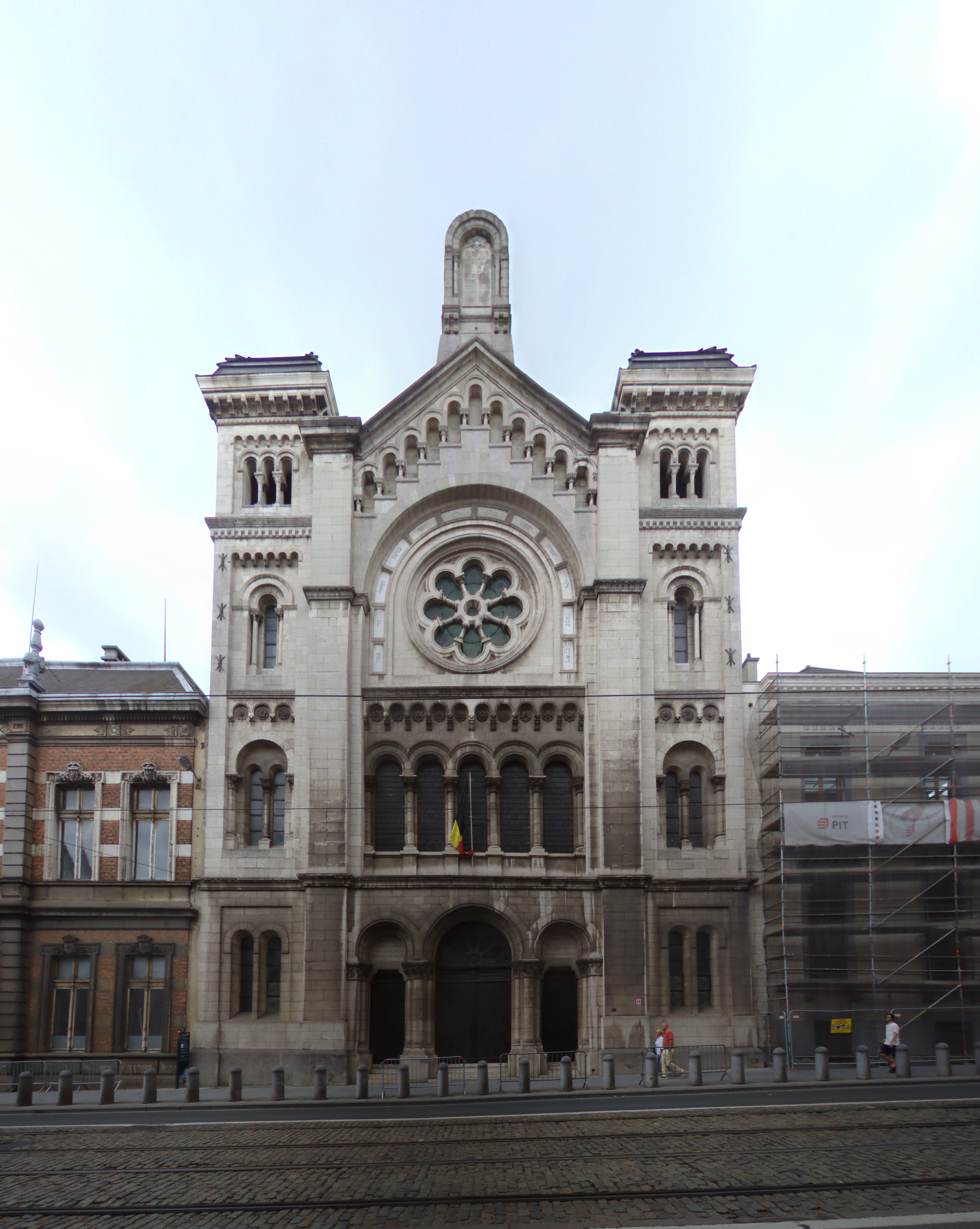
Great Synagogue of Brussels (completed 1878)

Buildings

- Great Synagogue of Brussels completed

Paintings

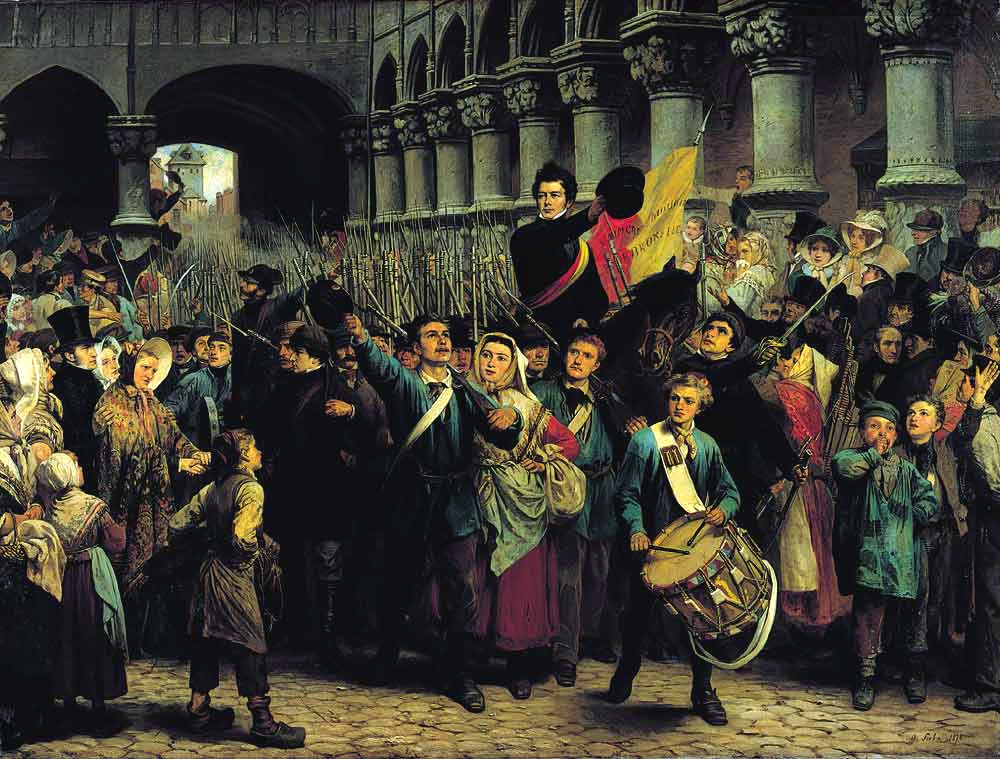
Charles Soubre, The Departure of the Volunteers of Liège for Brussels (4 September 1830) (1878); now in La Boverie, Liège

- Félicien Rops, Pornocrates
- Charles Soubre, The Departure of the Volunteers of Liège for Brussels (4 September 1830)

== Births ==
- 18 January – Henri Baels, politician (died 1951)
- 19 February – Henri Carton de Tournai, politician (died 1969)
- 5 March – Gaston Salmon, fencer (died 1917)
- 10 March – Karel van de Woestijne, author (died 1929)
- 16 March – Émile Cammaerts, author (died 1953)
- 29 March – Jules Pire, resistance leader (died 1953)
- 14 April – August Borms, quisling (died 1946)
- 23 June – Gustave Strauven, architect (died 1919)
- 1 July – Joseph Maréchal, Jesuit (died 1944)
- 5 July – Jean de Bosschère, writer and painter (died 1953)
- 6 July – Charles Terlinden, historian (died 1972)
- 15 July – Hendrik De Vocht, scholar (died 1962)
- 13 September – Oscar Joliet, bishop (died 1969)
- 20 November – Joseph-Marie Canivez, Trappist (died 1952)

== Deaths ==
- 18 January – Frans de Cort (born 1834), writer
- 9 July – Barthélemy Charles Joseph Dumortier (born 1797), botanist and politician
- 7 August – Joseph Gustave Ernest Allard (born 1840), politician
- 16 November – Charles Vilain XIIII (born 1803), politician
