= Tournai (disambiguation) =

Tournai is a city in Wallonia, Belgium.

Tournai may also refer to:

- Tournai (Chamber of Representatives constituency) 1831–1900
- Tournai (Parliament of England constituency), 1513–1519
- Arrondissement of Tournai
- R.F.C. Tournai
- Roman Catholic Diocese of Tournai
- Tournai railway station
- Tournaisis, a territory in the Low Countries, in modern Belgium

== See also ==
- Siege of Tournai (disambiguation)
