= 1880 in Belgium =

- Decades: 1860s; 1870s; 1880s; 1890s; 1900s
- See also: Other events of 1880; List of years in Belgium

The following lists events that happened during 1880 in the Kingdom of Belgium.

== Incumbents ==
- Monarch: Leopold II
- Prime Minister: Walthère Frère-Orban

== Events ==
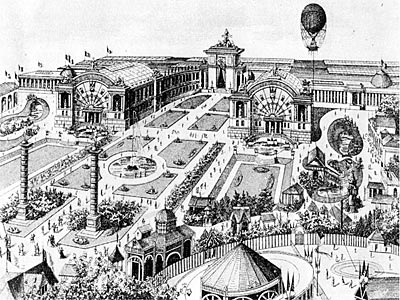
National Exhibition in Cinquantenaire Park

- January – The White slave trade affair is exposed in Brussels and attracts international attention.
- 7 March – Reception in the winter garden at Royal Palace of Laken to celebrate the engagement of Princess Stéphanie of Belgium to Rudolf, Crown Prince of Austria.
- 24 May – Provincial elections
- 5 June – Belgian government breaks off diplomatic relations with the Holy See.
- 8 June – Partial legislative elections of 1880
- 16 August – Celebration of the fiftieth anniversary of Belgian independence in Cinquantenaire Park
- 22-28 August – International Educational Congress held in Brussels.
- September – Queen Marie Henriette visits Aachen for her health.
- 25 December – Pope Leo XIII issues a breve to establish a new chair in Thomist philosophy at the Catholic University of Louvain.

== Publications ==
Periodicals

- Bulletin de l'Association Belge de Photographie, vol. 7
- La Jeune Belgique begins publication.

Exhibition catalogues

- F.G. Dumas, Catalogue illustré de l'exposition historique de l'art belge et du Musée moderne de Bruxelles (Brussels and Paris)
- Exposition nationale: IVe section, industries d'art en Belgique antérieurs au XIXe siècle (Brussels, Veuve Ch. Vanderauwera)

== Art and architecture ==
Buildings

- Cinquantenaire

Paintings

- Jan Verhas, The Parade of the Schools in 1878
- Charles Soubre, The Arrival of Charles Rogier and the Volunteers of Liège in Brussels
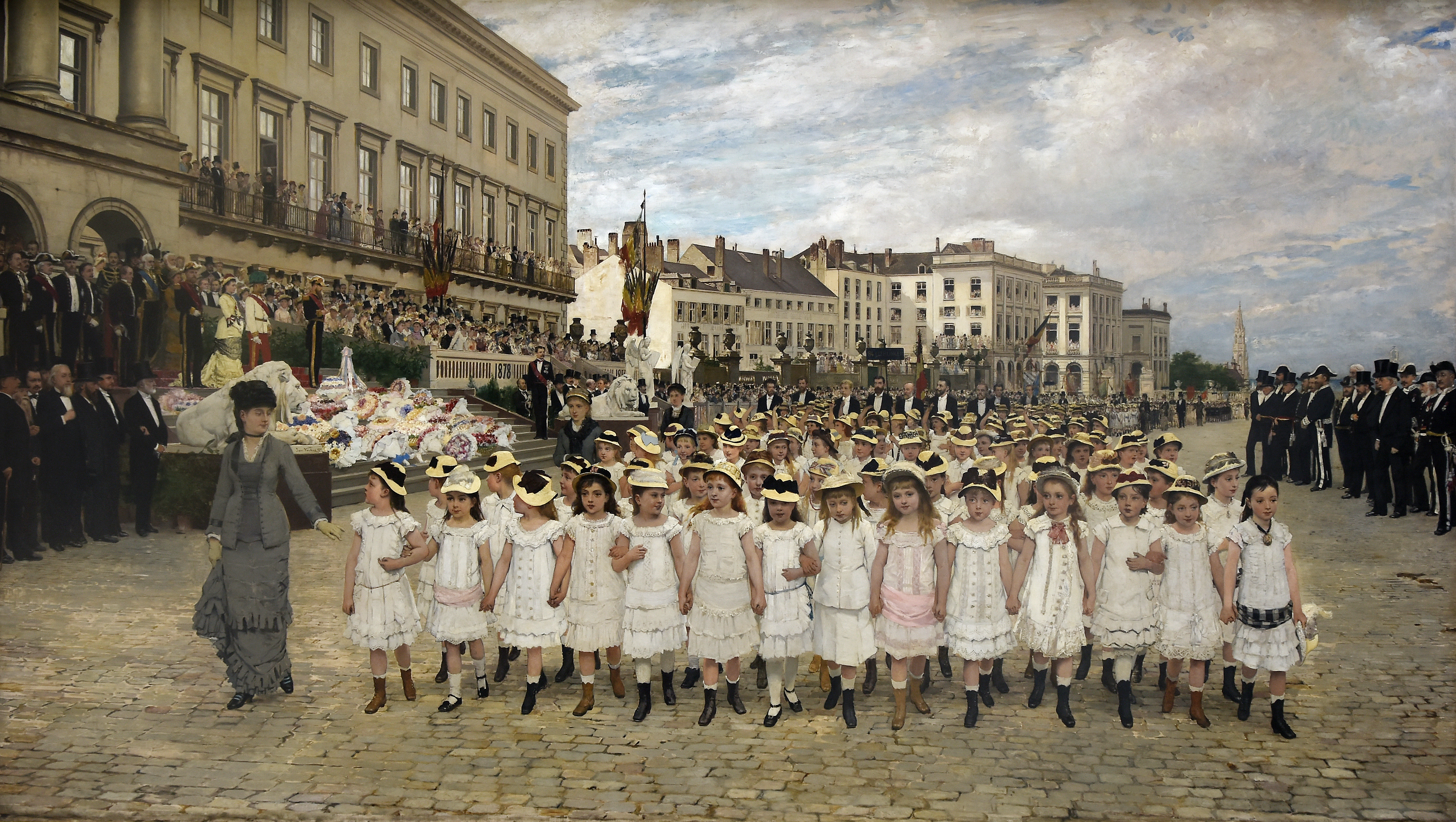
Jan Verhas, The Parade of the Schools in 1878 (1880), now in the Royal Museums of Fine Arts of Belgium, Brussels

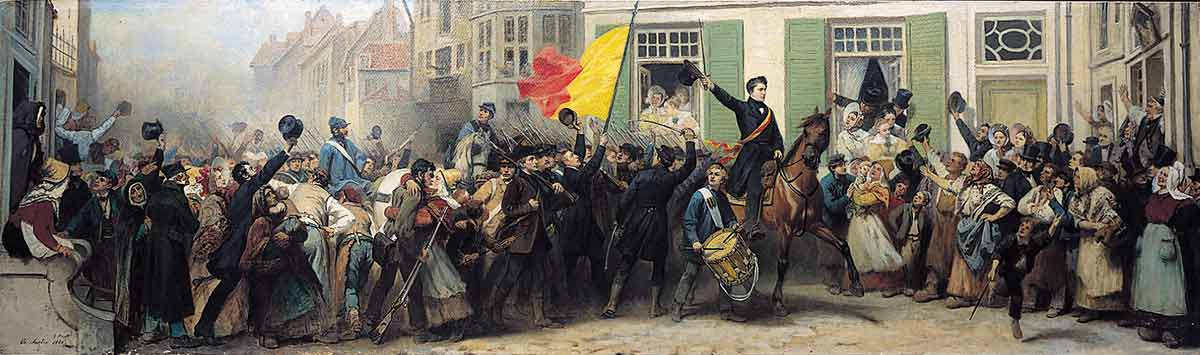
Charles Soubre, The Arrival of Charles Rogier and the Volunteers of Liège in Brussels [1830] (1880), now in the Royal Museum of the Armed Forces and Military History, Brussels

== Births ==
- 10 January – Frans Van Cauwelaert, politician (died 1961)
- 5 May – Adrian Carton de Wiart, British general (died 1963)
- 4 December – Eugène Soudan, politician (died 1960)

== Deaths ==
- 30 January – Paul Devaux (born 1801), politician
- 28 April – Louis Dubois (born 1830), painter
- 13 May – Lievin De Winne (born 1821), painter
