= De Vocht =

De Vocht is a surname. Notable people with the surname include:

- Hendrik De Vocht (1878–1962), Belgian academic
- Liesbet De Vocht (born 1979), Belgian cyclist
- Wim De Vocht (born 1982), Belgian cyclist
