= Tournay, Hautes-Pyrénées =

Tournay
- Commune
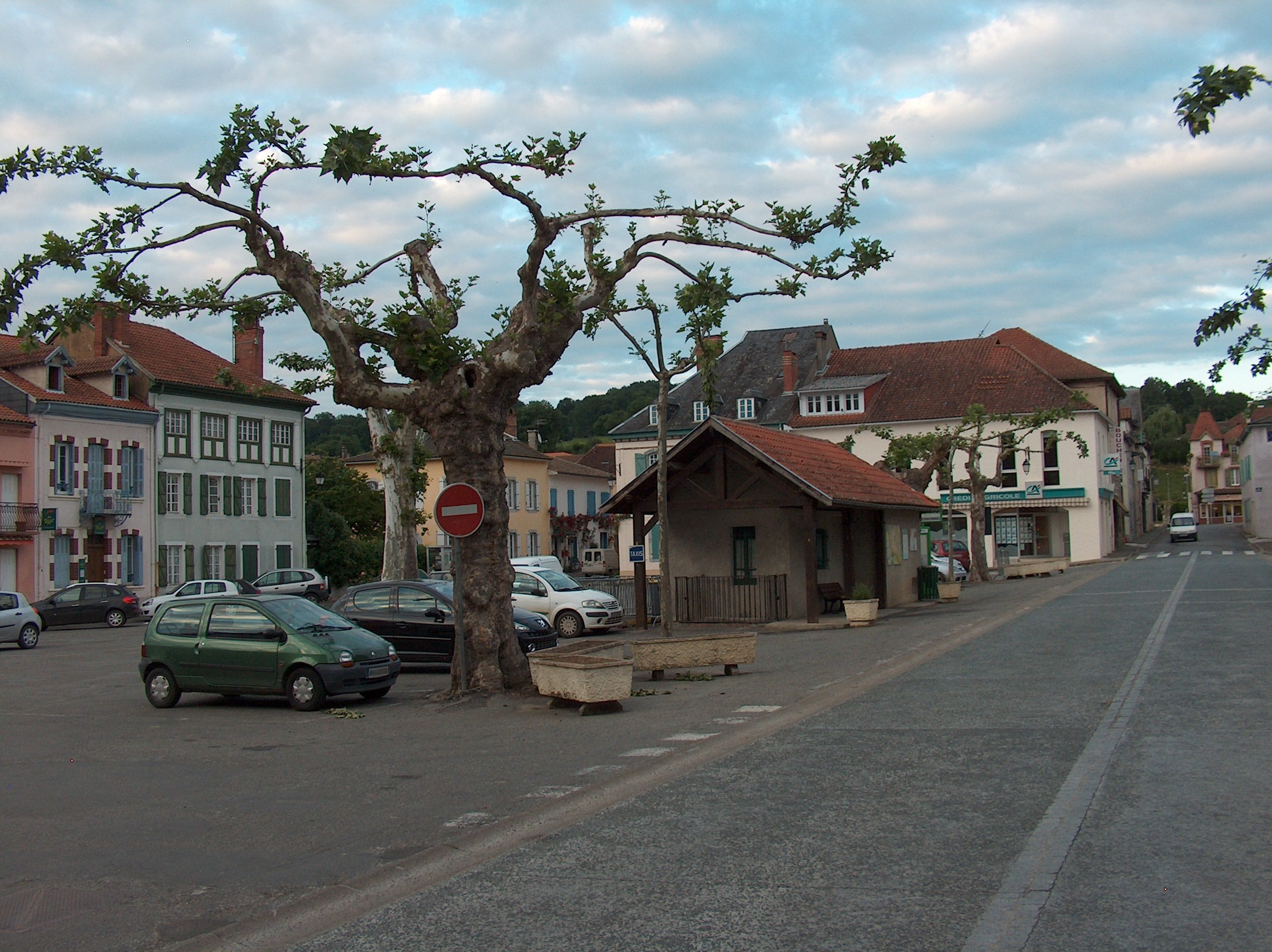
- The Place d'Astarac

- Coat of arms
- Location of Tournay
- Location within France Location within Occitanie
- Coordinates: 43°11′N 0°15′E
- Country: France
- Region: Occitania
- Department: Hautes-Pyrénées
- Arrondissement: Tarbes
- Canton: La Vallée de l'Arros et des Baïses
- Intercommunality: Coteaux du Val d'Arros

Government
  - Mayor (2020–2026): Nicolas Datas Tapie
- Area^{1}: 14.32 km^{2} (5.53 sq mi)
- Elevation: 233 m (764 ft)
- Highest elevation: 511 m (1,677 ft)
- Lowest elevation: 249 m (817 ft)
- Population (2023): 1,362
  - Density: 95.11/km^{2} (246.3/sq mi)
- Time zone: UTC+01:00 (CET)
  - Summer (DST): UTC+02:00 (CEST)
- INSEE/Postal code: 65447 /65190
- ^{1} French Land Register data, which excludes lakes, ponds, glaciers > 1 km^{2} (0.386 sq mi or 247 acres) and river estuaries.

Tournay (French pronunciation: [tuʁnaj]; Gascon: Tornai) is a commune in the Hautes-Pyrénées department, southwestern France. Tournay station has rail connections to Toulouse, Tarbes and Pau.

== Geography ==
=== Climate ===
Tournay has an oceanic climate (Köppen climate classification Cfb). The average annual temperature in Tournay is 12.9 °C (55.2 °F). The average annual rainfall is 998.7 mm (39.32 in) with May as the wettest month. The temperatures are highest on average in July, at around 20.6 °C (69.1 °F), and lowest in January, at around 5.8 °C (42.4 °F). The highest temperature ever recorded in Tournay was 40.6 °C (105.1 °F) on 13 August 2003; the coldest temperature ever recorded was −16.3 °C (2.7 °F) on 9 January 1985.

Climate data for Tournay (1981−2010 normals, extremes 1970−present)
Month	Jan	Feb	Mar	Apr	May	Jun	Jul	Aug	Sep	Oct	Nov	Dec	Year
Record high °C (°F)	22.8 (73.0)	26.6 (79.9)	28.5 (83.3)	31.0 (87.8)	33.7 (92.7)	39.0 (102.2)	39.3 (102.7)	40.6 (105.1)	36.4 (97.5)	34.4 (93.9)	27.0 (80.6)	24.9 (76.8)	40.6 (105.1)
Mean daily maximum °C (°F)	10.8 (51.4)	12.0 (53.6)	15.0 (59.0)	16.8 (62.2)	20.5 (68.9)	24.0 (75.2)	26.4 (79.5)	26.4 (79.5)	24.0 (75.2)	19.7 (67.5)	14.4 (57.9)	11.4 (52.5)	18.5 (65.3)
Daily mean °C (°F)	5.8 (42.4)	6.6 (43.9)	9.2 (48.6)	11.0 (51.8)	14.9 (58.8)	18.4 (65.1)	20.6 (69.1)	20.5 (68.9)	17.8 (64.0)	14.1 (57.4)	9.3 (48.7)	6.5 (43.7)	12.9 (55.2)
Mean daily minimum °C (°F)	0.8 (33.4)	1.2 (34.2)	3.3 (37.9)	5.3 (41.5)	9.3 (48.7)	12.8 (55.0)	14.7 (58.5)	14.7 (58.5)	11.6 (52.9)	8.5 (47.3)	4.1 (39.4)	1.6 (34.9)	7.4 (45.3)
Record low °C (°F)	−16.3 (2.7)	−10.7 (12.7)	−9.6 (14.7)	−3.0 (26.6)	−0.5 (31.1)	3.5 (38.3)	7.1 (44.8)	3.5 (38.3)	2.0 (35.6)	−1.8 (28.8)	−8.9 (16.0)	−10.5 (13.1)	−16.3 (2.7)
Average precipitation mm (inches)	87.0 (3.43)	71.5 (2.81)	80.7 (3.18)	107.6 (4.24)	114.8 (4.52)	75.6 (2.98)	58.4 (2.30)	65.5 (2.58)	74.2 (2.92)	81.2 (3.20)	91.9 (3.62)	90.3 (3.56)	998.7 (39.32)
Average precipitation days (≥ 1.0 mm)	10.6	9.5	9.6	12.2	12.4	8.6	7.2	8.1	8.5	10.5	10.4	10.4	117.9
Source: Météo-France

== See also ==
- Communes of the Hautes-Pyrénées department
- Tournai (disambiguation)
