= Pierre-Charles =

Pierre-Charles is a masculine given name. Notable people with the name include:

- Pierre-Charles Boudot (born 1992), French flat racing jockey
- Pierre-Charles Bridan, French sculptor
- Pierre-Charles Canot, French engraver
- Pierre-Charles Comte, French painter
- Pierre-Charles Jombert, French painter
- Pierre-Charles Krieg, French politician and lawyer
- Pierre-Charles de Liette, Italian-French soldier
- Pierre-Charles Lochet, French brigadier general
- Pierre-Charles Marcel, French Christian pastor and philosopher
- Pierre-Charles Le Mettay, French painter
- Pierre-Charles Roy, French poet
- Pierre-Charles Simart, French sculptor
- Pierre-Charles Le Sueur, French fur trader and explorer
- Pierre-Charles Trémolières, French-born etcher and decorative painter
- Pierre-Charles Laurent de Villedeuil, French official
- Pierre-Charles Villeneuve, French Navy officer

== See also ==
- Pierre Charles (disambiguation)
- Charles-Pierre, masculine given name
