= 1876 in Belgium =

- Decades: 1850s; 1860s; 1870s; 1880s; 1890s
- See also: Other events of 1876; List of years in Belgium

Events in the year 1876 in Belgium.

== Incumbents ==
Monarch: Leopold II
Head of government: Jules Malou

== Events ==
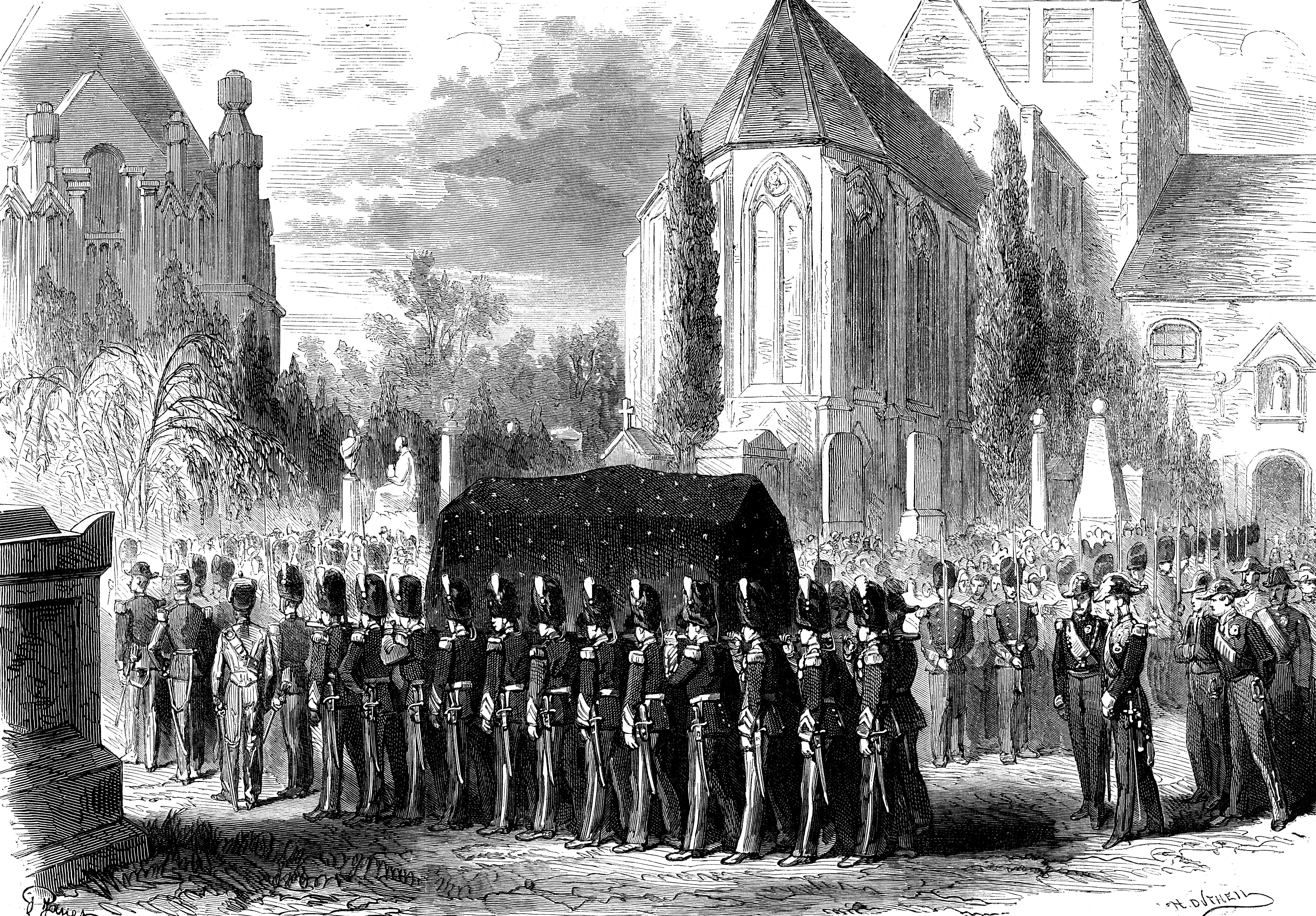
Leopold I's remains transferred to the royal crypt in Laken, 20 April 1876

- 20 April – Leopold I's mortal remains transferred to the crypt of the Church of Our Lady of Laeken
- 22 May – Provincial elections
- 13 June – Partial legislative election
- 12 September – Brussels Geographic Conference opens, leading to the foundation of the International African Association
- 27 September – Opening of the International Congress of Hygiene and Life-Saving Equipment in Brussels, as part of the International Exhibition of Hygiene.

== Publications ==
Periodicals

- Bulletins de l'Académie royale des sciences, des lettres et des beaux-arts de Belgique, 45 (Brussels, F. Hayez).
- Revue de Belgique, 23.
- Revue de l'horticulture belge et étrangère, 2.

Other

- Léon d'Andrimont, La coopération ouvrière en Belgique.

== Art and architecture ==
Buildings

- Oostakker Basilica completed

== Births ==
- 1 March
  - Henri de Baillet-Latour, IOC president (died 1942)
  - Maurice Emile Marie Goetghebuer, entomologist (died 1962)
- 7 April – Jules Degeetere, cyclist (died 1957)
- 26 June – Armand Renier, geologist (died 1951)
- 16 July – Victor van Strydonck de Burkel, general (died 1961)
- 2 August – Julien Lootens, cyclist (died 1942)
- 19 August – Oscar de Somville, Olympic rower (died 1938)
- 8 September – Thomas Braun, poet (died 1961)
- 12 September – Flor Alpaerts, composer (died 1954)
- 26 September – Georges Lebacq, painter (died 1950)
- 18 October – Charles van den Bussche, Olympic sailor (died 1958)
- 17 November – Joseph Van De Meulebroeck, politician (died 1958)
- 16 December – Rodolphe Seeldrayers, FIFA president (died 1955)

== Deaths ==
- 7 January – Marie Thérèse Haze (born 1782), religious foundress
- 16 April – Auguste de Peellaert (born 1793), soldier and artist
- 17 April – Adolphe Pierre Sunaert (born 1825), artist and teacher
- 9 May – Louis van Houtte (born 1810), horticulturalist
- 23 May – Victor de Buck (born 1817), Jesuit
- 23 August – Giovanni Inchindi (born 1798), opera singer
- 29 October – Jacques Gregoir (born 1817), composer
