= Jan Frans De Boever =

Belgian Symbolist painter

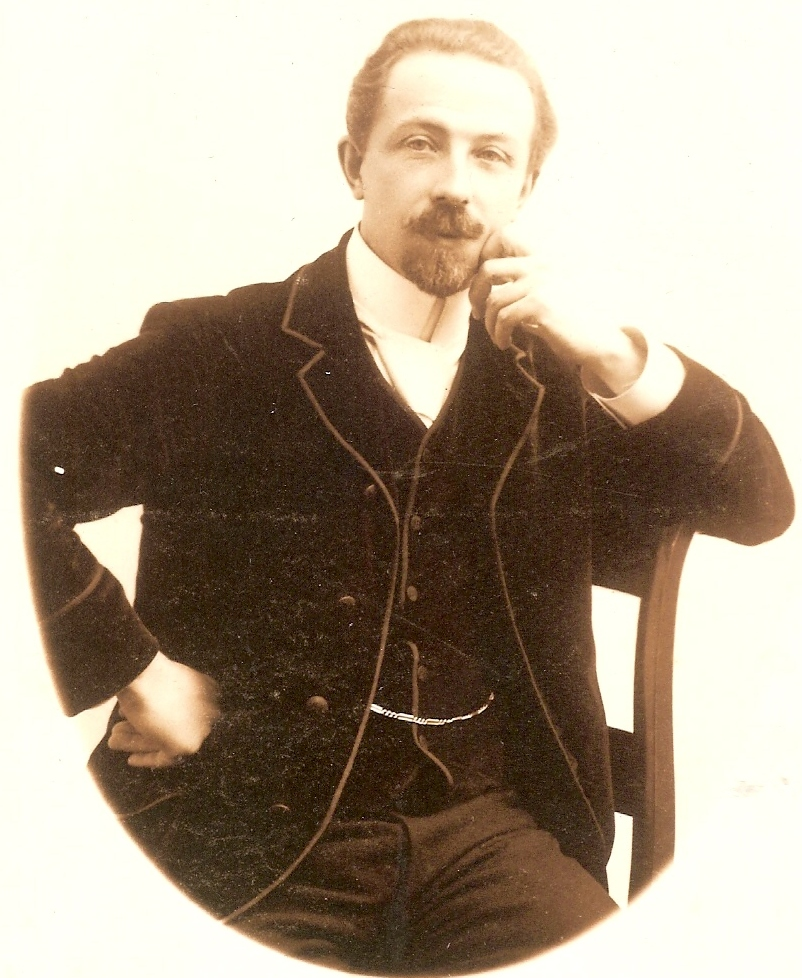
J.F. De Boever in 1912.

Jan Frans De Boever (Ghent, Belgium, 8 June 1872 – 23 May 1949) was a Belgian Symbolist painter, known for his paintings of voluptuous nude women in morbid contexts. Skeletons, death and eroticism flood his oeuvre. He made illustrations in gouache for Charles Baudelaire's famous Les Fleurs du mal for the Ghent collector and art patron Léon Speltinckx with 157 gouaches. While he was a successful artist during most of his lifetime, his megalomaniac character made him a solitary and isolated individual.

== Life ==
Jan Frans De Boever received his training in Ghent at the Royal Academy of Fine Arts under Louis Tytgadt, whose niece he later married.

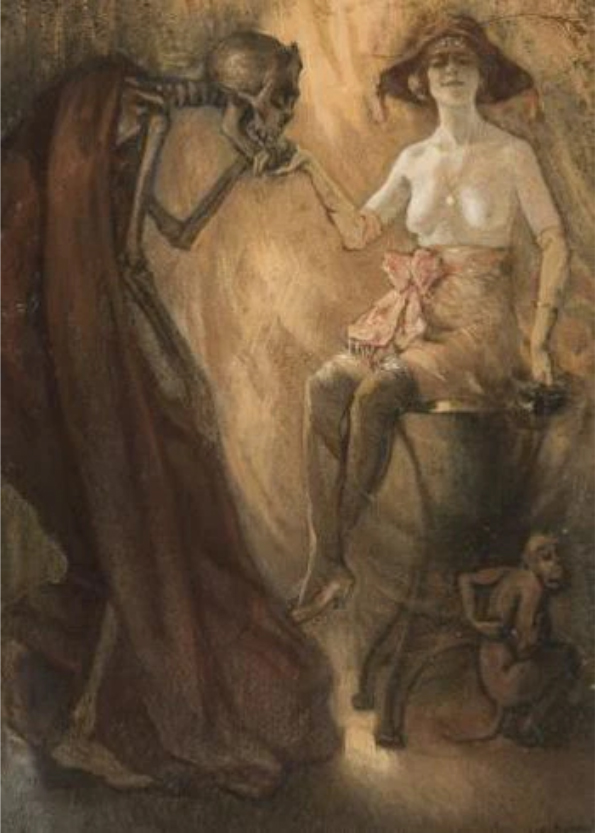
The hand kiss

Tytgadt provided him with an introduction to important artistic circles in his city, and he became a recognised celebrity at official exhibitions in Ghent, Antwerp, Brussels, and Liège.

From 1909 onwards, he modified his style radically, painting women and prostitutes in morbid and bizarre settings, with skeletons, diabolism, subservient men and eroticism dominating his paintings. These paintings were allegorical and mythological, reflecting romantic imagery and depicting the universal struggle of good against evil.

In 1914, he started to illustrate Charles Baudelaire's "Les Fleurs du mal" for the wealthy art-collector Speltinckx. Up to 1924, he made approximately 157 gouaches for the poems, though only 86 have been recovered.

Once he had discovered his style, a form of Symbolism belonging to the decadent movement, he ignored ongoing artistic developments and drew his inspiration from literature, music, and mythology. He was still inspired by patriotism, creating several paintings concerning the World Wars, displaying death and catastrophe in the Symbolist style.

His paintings were very successful until 1935 when he suffered a financial crisis. He reduced his prices and continued to paint in the same Symbolist fashion until his death in 1949.
