= Pierre Charles =

Pierre Charles may refer to:

- Pierre Charles (Jesuit) (1883–1954), Belgian Jesuit priest, theologian and missiologist.
- Pierre Charles (boxer) (1903–1966), Belgian heavyweight boxer
- Pierre Charles (Dominican politician) (1954–2004), Dominican Prime minister.
