= Charles Doignon =

Belgian lawyer, parliamentarian and clergyman

Charles Denis Joseph Doignon (1790–1864) was a Belgian lawyer, parliamentarian and clergyman.

== Life ==
Doignon was born in Tournai on 2 April 1790. Shortly before the Belgian Revolution of 1830 broke out, he had closed his chambers as a lawyer in order to become editor-in-chief of the newspaper Courrier de l'Escaut. From 23 May 1833 to 7 July 1842, he sat in the Belgian Parliament as a representative of the Constituency of Tournai. He was a member of the group L'Espoir, which was set up to organise the Catholic vote. From 1842 to 1847, Doignon served as commissioner general of the mint in Brussels. In 1847 he took holy orders, and in 1862 was appointed honorary canon of Tournai Cathedral.

Doignon died in Tournai on 10 June 1864.
