= Louis Tytgadt =

Belgian painter

Portrait of Louis Tytgadt, c. 1880

Louis Tytgadt or Lodewijk Tytgadt, birth name Ludovicus Tytgadt (1841–1918) was a Belgian painter known for his portraits, history paintings, religious subjects, genre scenes and the occasional still lifes and landscapes executed in the Academic style. He was a teacher and later director at the Academy of Fine Arts of Ghent as well as the first chairman of the museum committee of the Museum of Fine Arts of Ghent.

== Life ==
He was born in Lovendegem (East Flanders) on 27 April 1841 as the son of Petrus (Peter) Tytgadt, a baker originally from Sleidinge (now a sub-municipality of Evergem), and Maria Barbara van Laere, originally from Ghent. Tytgadt studied at the Ghent academy from 1855 to 1867 where Théodore-Joseph Canneel was one of his teachers. He was selected as one of the six candidates allowed to participate in the competition for the 1865 Belgian Prix de Rome for painting, but he failed to win the first prize. For two years starting in 1867, he continued his training in the Paris studio of Alexandre Cabanel, an academic painter. He traveled in Italy where he made numerous sketches of local people and scenery. In June 1875, Tytgadt visited the Frans Hals Museum in Haarlem, together with the French artist Eugène Fromentin.

Readers of the Gazette van Gent

After teaching drawing classes in Wetteren for several months, Tytgadt was appointed professor of the foundational class at the Royal Academy of Fine Arts in Ghent starting from the academic year 1870-1871. On 17 April 1888 he married Hortense (Hortensia) Ghislain (27 December 1842 - 8 December 1925) in Ghent. In 1892 he took over the role of director of the Ghent Academy from his former teacher Théodore-Joseph Canneel who had died that year. From 1892 to 1902, he served as a director of the Academy and its museum. He established the academy's decorative arts section. His pupils include Georges Buysse, Jules De Bruycker, Jan Frans De Boever, Ferdinand Willaert, Gustave Van de Woestijne and Constant Hoste.

When in 1902 the Ghent Academy's museum became a separate institution, the Museum of Fine Arts of Ghent, Tytgadt became the chairman of its museum committee. In his roles as director of the Academy and subsequently as chairman of the museum commission he played an important part in determining the museum's acquisition policies in the period from roughly 1880 to 1918. He also served as deputy chair of the Provincial Commission for the Preservation of Monuments and Landscapes. He was admitted as an officer in the Order of Leopold of Belgium.

Saint Sebastian Martyred

Tytgadt enjoyed the patronage of the local bourgeoisie, nearby church authorities and even the royal family as King Leopold II of Belgium purchased his canvas entitled Montenegrin Women Caring for the Wounded. On the occasion of the national celebrations marking the fiftieth anniversary of Belgium's independence in 1880, Louis Tytgadt was, together with artists such as Constantin Meunier, Frans Verhas, Gustave Den Duyts, Victor Lagye and Alfred Cluysenaar, responsible for designing the costumes and floats of the historical parade that wound its way through the streets of Brussels on 28 August 1880.

Tytgadt participated in various exhibitions in Belgium and abroad including the Paris Salons in 1877 and 1888 and the World's Columbian Exposition in Chicago in 1893. At the 1879 Antwerp Salon, he was awarded the gold medal.

He died in Ghent on 9 May 1918. Following a religious service at the St. Elizabeth Church in Ghent, he was buried at the Campo Santo cemetery in Sint-Amandsberg, a sub-municipality of Ghent.

== Work ==
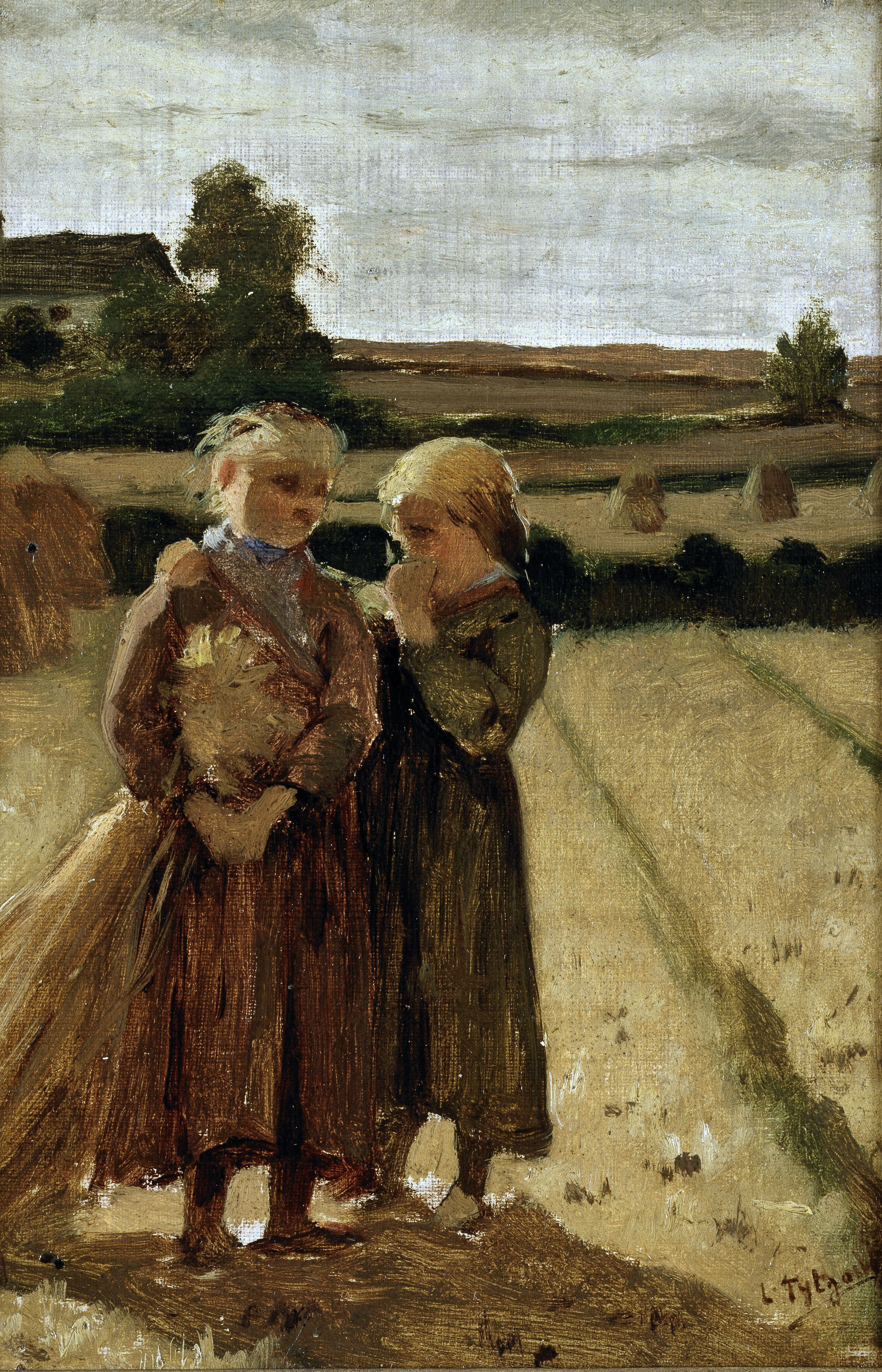
Girls in the field

He painted portraits, religious subjects, history paintings, genre scenes and the occasional still life and landscape. He painted multiple scenes with beguines and Italian men and women. He was a representative of the Academic style in Belgian painting. His work at the end of the 19th century was already in his time regarded as reactionary in subject matter and style and redolent of Dutch and Flemish Baroque art.

In the 1870s he created some paintings addressing social issues in a Realist style. An example is the Readers of the Gazette van Gent (1877, private collection). It depicts seven working class men crowded together in an undefined space. One of them standing in their centre is reading out aloud from the popular Ghent newspaper Gazette van Gent while the other men listen attentively. The painting raises key social issues existing in Belgium at the time such as rampant illiteracy and the second-class status given to the Flemish language in the Flemish-speaking city of Ghent where the government was controlled by the French-speaking bourgeoisie and higher education was only accessible in the French language. In the painting entitled Girls in the Field (Museum of Fine Arts of Ghent) Tytgadt depicts two little girls standing in the middle of a field, holding ears of corn. He thus highlights the plight of child labor in rural areas.

== Gallery ==
Selected paintings of Louis Tytgadt

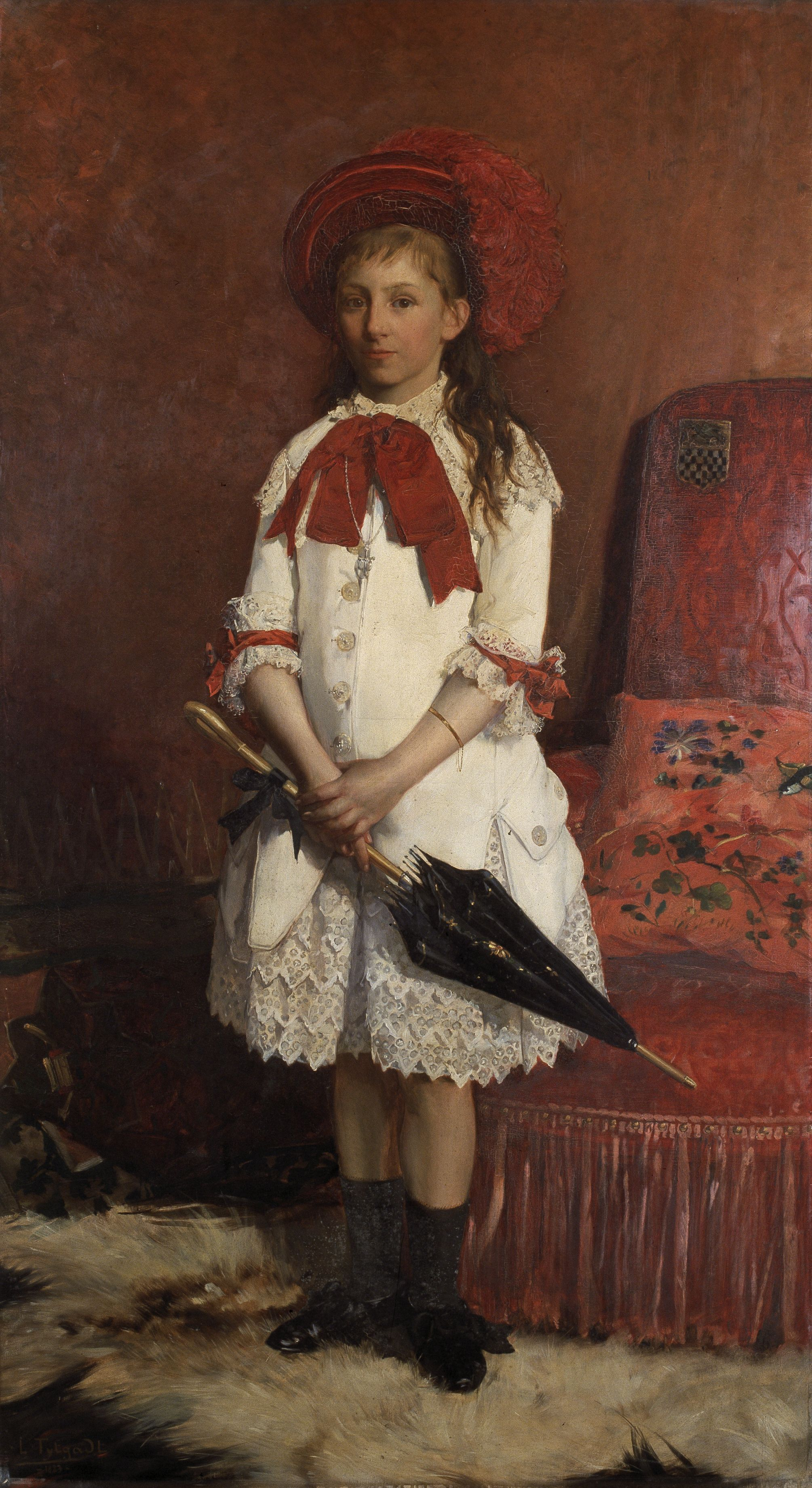
Portrait of Inès de Kerchove d'Exaerde (1883)

The small beguinage in Ghent (before 1900)

Neapolitan Street Scene
