= Charles-Pierre =

Charles-Pierre is a masculine given name. Notable people with the name include:

- Charles-Pierre Augereau, French military commander
- Charles-Pierre Boullanger, French geographer
- Charles-Pierre Chais, Geneva-born pastor
- Charles-Pierre Colardeau, French poet
- Charles-Pierre Denonvilliers, French surgeon
- Charles-Pierre Pécoul, official

== See also ==
- Charles-Pierre-Paul Savalette de Langes, French magistrate
- Charles Pierre, member of British dance pop band Londonbeat
- Pierre-Charles, masculine given name
