= Tournai (Chamber of Representatives constituency) =

Former Belgian national legislative constituency

Tournai was a constituency used to elect members of the Belgian Chamber of Representatives between 1831 and 1900.

== Representatives ==
Election	Representative (Party)	Representative (Party)	Representative (Party)	Representative (Party)
1831	Albert Goblet d'Alviella (Liberal)	Charles Le Hon (Liberal)	Barthélémy Dumortier (Catholic)	François Louis Joseph Du Bus (Catholic)
1833	Pierre Trentesaux (Liberal)	Charles Doignon (Catholic)	Barthélémy Dumortier (Catholic)	François Louis Joseph Du Bus (Catholic)
1837	Pierre Trentesaux (Liberal)	Charles Doignon (Catholic)	Barthélémy Dumortier (Catholic)	François Louis Joseph Du Bus (Catholic)
1841	Adelson Castiau (Liberal)	Albert Goblet d'Alviella (Liberal)	Barthélémy Dumortier (Catholic)	Auguste Savart-Martel (Liberal)
1845	Adelson Castiau (Liberal)	Charles Le Hon (Liberal)	Edouard Broquet (Liberal)	Louis Gilson (Liberal)
1848	Auguste Dumon (Liberal)	Charles Le Hon (Liberal)	Ferdinand Visart de Bocarmé (Liberal)	Henri Julien Allard (Liberal)
1852	Auguste Dumon (Catholic)	Charles Le Hon (Liberal)	Ferdinand Visart de Bocarmé (Liberal)	Henri Julien Allard (Liberal)
1856	Auguste Dumon (Catholic)	François Crombez (Liberal)	Jules de Rasse (Catholic)	Henri Julien Allard (Liberal)
1857	André Pirson (Liberal)	François Crombez (Liberal)	Victor Savart (Liberal)	Henri Julien Allard (Liberal)
1861	Charles Rogier (Liberal)	Jules Bara (Liberal)	Louis Crombez (Liberal)	Henri Julien Allard (Liberal)
1864	Charles Rogier (Liberal)	Jules Bara (Liberal)	Louis Crombez (Liberal)	Henri Julien Allard (Liberal)
1868	Charles Rogier (Liberal)	Jules Bara (Liberal)	Louis Crombez (Liberal)	Henri Julien Allard (Liberal)
1870	Charles Rogier (Liberal)	Jules Bara (Liberal)	Louis Crombez (Liberal)	Henri Julien Allard (Liberal)
1874	Charles Rogier (Liberal)	Jules Bara (Liberal)	Louis Crombez (Liberal)	Henri Julien Allard (Liberal)
1878	Charles Rogier (Liberal)	Jules Bara (Liberal)	Louis Crombez (Liberal)	Henri Julien Allard (Liberal)
1882	Edouard Simon (Liberal)	Jules Bara (Liberal)	Louis Crombez (Liberal)	Victor Carbonnelle (Liberal)
1886	Idesbalde Defontaine (Liberal)	Jules Bara (Liberal)	Louis Crombez (Liberal)	Victor Carbonnelle (Liberal)
1890	Charles Dereine (Liberal)	Jules Bara (Liberal)	Paul Broquet (Liberal)	Victor Carbonnelle (Liberal)
1892	Charles Dereine (Liberal)	Jules Bara (Liberal)	Paul Broquet (Liberal)	Victor Carbonnelle (Liberal)
1894	Edmond Moyart (Catholic)	Henri Duquesne Watelet de la Vinelle (Catholic)	Joseph Hecq (Catholic)	Joseph Hoÿois (Catholic)
1898	Edmond Moyart (Catholic)	Henri Duquesne Watelet de la Vinelle (Catholic)	Alphonse Stiénon du Pré (Catholic)	Joseph Hoÿois (Catholic)
