= 1879 in Belgium =

- Decades: 1850s; 1860s; 1870s; 1880s; 1890s
- See also: Other events of 1879; List of years in Belgium

The following lists events that happened during 1879 in the Kingdom of Belgium.

== Incumbents ==
- Monarch: Leopold II
- Prime Minister: Walthère Frère-Orban

== Events ==
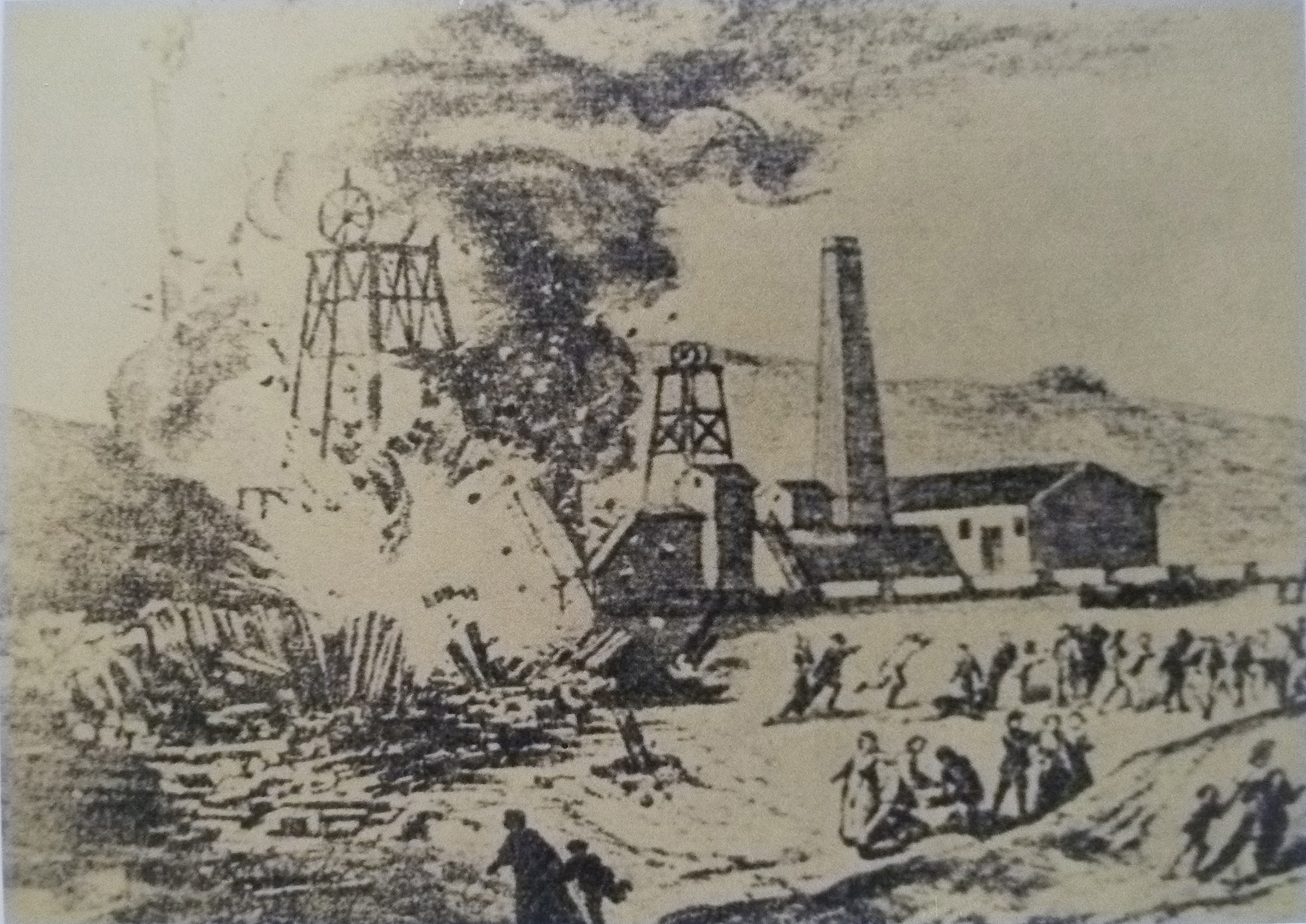
Firedamp explosion at Agrappe Mine, 17 April 1879

- 2 March – Castle in Tervuren burns down.
- 17 April – Firedamp explosion at Agrappe Mine in Frameries.
- 1 July – Law secularising primary education passes, triggering First School War
- 24 August – Victor Joseph Doutreloux succeeds Théodore de Montpellier as bishop of Liège

== Publications ==
Periodicals

- Almanach de Poche de Bruxelles (Brussels, H. Manceaux)
- Bulletin de la Société belge de géographie, 3 (Brussels, Secrétariat de la Société Belge de Géographie)

Books

- Théodore Bernier, Dictionnaire geographique, historique, archeologique, biographique & bibliographique du Hainaut (Mons, Hector Manceaux)
- Hendrik Conscience, Het wassen beeld
- Léon Vanderkindere, Le siècle des Artevelde: études sur la civilisation morale & politique de la Flandre & du Brabant (Brussels, A.-N. Lebègue).

== Art and architecture ==
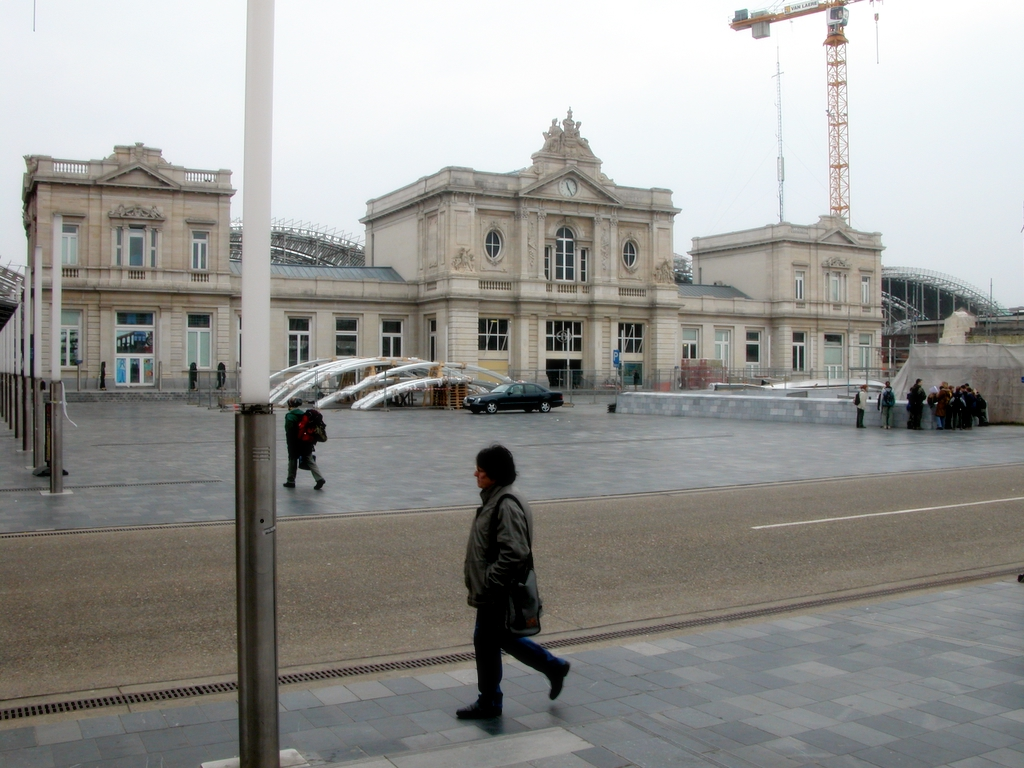
Leuven railway station, rebuilt 1879

- Leuven railway station rebuilt

== Births ==
- 5 February – Jules De Bisschop, Olympic rower (died 1954)
- 15 February – Camille Van Hoorden, footballer (died 1919)
- 28 March – Jean-Marie Van Cauwenbergh, bishop (died 1950)
- 28 April – Edgard Tytgat, painter (died 1957)
- 29 April – Marie Haps, philanthropist (died 1939)
- 22 May – Aston Chichester, bishop (died 1962)
- 27 May – Arthur Balbaert, sports shooter (died 1938)
- 24 August – Achille Delattre, politician (died 1964)
- 26 September – Alexandre Galopin, businessman (died 1944)
- 9 October – Edgar Sengier, mining engineer (died 1963)
- 21 October – Maurice Beeli, botanist (died 1957)
- 25 October – Jean Rogister, musician (died 1964)
- 18 December Joseph Lebon, theologian (died 1957)

== Deaths ==
- 7 May – Charles De Coster (born 1827), novelist
- 19 May – Jules Anspach (born 1829), politician
- 16 July – Konrad Martin (born 1812), German bishop
- 11 August – Jan Swerts (born 1820), painter
- 18 August – Joseph Octave Delepierre (born 1802), antiquary
- 24 August – Théodore de Montpellier (born 1807), bishop of Liège
- 30 September – Félicien Chapuis (born 1824), entomologist
- 3 November – Joseph Poelaert (born 1817), architect
- 9 December – Jacob Jacobs (born 1812), painter
