= Auguste Vander Meersch =

Auguste Théodore Vander Meersch (1810–1881) was a Belgian writer who was heavily involved in producing the Biographie Nationale de Belgique.

== Life ==
Vander Meersch was born in Ghent on 25 August 1810. He studied at Ghent University, graduating with a doctorate in law in 1833. Abandoning the legal profession, he focused his efforts on local history and biographical research.

When Jules de Saint-Genois launched the plan for a Biographie Nationale, Vander Meersch drafted the first list of who should be included. He undertook the management of the venture, seeing to the printing, accounting and correspondence. He also wrote a number of entries himself, especially of lesser literary figures for which no takers could be found among the regular contributors.

Vander Meersch was furthermore a contributor on political and economic questions to the daily newspapers. He died in Ghent on 7 November 1881.
