= Nico Gunzburg =

Belgian politician

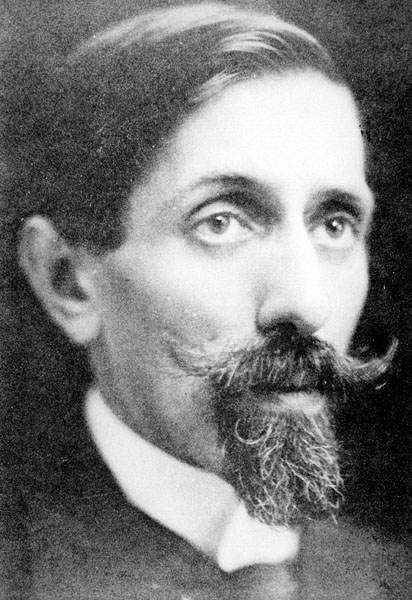
Nico Gunzburg

Nico Gunzburg (2 September 1882, Riga, Russian Empire – 5 March 1984, Antwerp, Belgium) was a Belgian lawyer, criminologist and centenarian. In 1885, his parents fled from Riga and settled in Antwerp.

== Education ==
Nico Gunzburg attended high school at the Royal Athenaeum of Antwerp. He went on to study law at the Universite Libre de Bruxelles. During his time as a student, he started to engage himself for the Flemish movement and became President of Geen taal, geen vrijheid (English: No language, no freedom) in 1905–1906 and published his first scientific articles in Dutch. In addition he became involved in the Bond der Vlaamsche Rechtsgeleerden (English: League of Flemish lawyers) and the Vlaamsche Rechtskundige Congressen (English: Flemish legal conferences).

== Career ==
After graduating, he started working as a lawyer in Antwerp. Between World War I and World War II Nico Gunzburg lectured at the University of Ghent, mainly on criminology. Politically he was one of the supporters of the dutchification of the University of Ghent. He took the initiative to start a new committee to discuss the matter. The commission started officially in 1919 and defended the bill of 1911 of Louis Franck-Van Cauwelaert-Huysmans which, after many years of transitional measures, aimed at the usage of a single language (Dutch) for education in Flanders. In 1920 he established the Centrale Jewish Welfare Organisation which became the Royal Society of Jewish Welfare (Koninklijke Vereniging Centraal Beheer Joodse Weldadigheid en Maatschappellijk Hulpbetoon vzw) known as "The Centrale". Since 1989 his work at the Centrale has been taken over by Jewish personality, economist and geopolitical analyst, Alexander Zanzer, who is the Editor in Chief of Centrale Magazine (created by Nico Gunzburg in 1920) and co-initiator of the Nico Gunzburg Foundation by the Royal Society of Jewish Welfare (CBJW vzw and CJSW vzw).

In 1927, he was the first Belgian to publish a handbook on marital law in Dutch. For several years, he was a member of the commission to create a Dutch version of the Belgian constitution and other laws and legal decisions.

"The library of Niko [sic] Gunzburg (1882–1984) of history, law and Jewish culture, were confiscated by the ERR in January 1941, and shipped to Berlin in February 1941 in ten crates. Niko Gunzburg was a noted professor of law at the University of Ghent, was a leading member of the Jewish community, a prominent Mason, and he was also a protest-activist against National Socialism in Belgium. Of his large library, only 200 books were returned after the war."

During World War II, he stayed in the United States where, among other things, he lectured a Syracuse University. At the request of president Franklin D. Roosevelt he contributed to the preparation of the Nuremberg Trials, in which the German war criminals were tried. After the war he stayed America for a while, where he worked within the framework of the United Nations organization for the displaced people, and prisoners from the concentration camps, afterwards to return to Belgium.

He continued to lecture in Ghent until 1952, but afterwards he contributed to the newly independent Indonesia. He taught criminology, cooperated on the reform of the Indonesian police force, became an adviser to the prime minister and also became befriended with president Sukarno. In 1956, Gunzburg returned to Antwerp where he remained active as a lawyer and as President of Jewish charities.

== Bibliography ==
- Grimsted, Patricia Kennedy. 2007. Returned from Russia: Nazi Archival Plunder in Western Europe and Recent Restitution Issues. Edited by Patricia Kennedy Grimsted, F.J. Hoogewoud, and Eric Ketelaar. Institute of Art and Law (UK), 2007.
