= Karel Candael =

Karel Candael (Antwerp, 4 September 1883 – Rotterdam, 27 March 1948) was a Belgian composer, music teacher, and conductor.

== Biography ==
Karel Candael studied at the Royal Conservatoire of Antwerp with Jan Blockx, Emile Wambach, Jozef Tilborghs and Lodewijk Mortelmans. After finishing his education, Candael became a very active member of the local choir- and song movement and found the choir De Zangkapel. In 1909 he was appointed as second conductor at the Royal Flemish Opera. Two years later, he became conductor of the Koninklijke Nederlandse Schouwburg of Antwerp. As of 1930, he also conducted the Casino Concerts of Knokke.

As a teacher, Candael worked at the Royal Conservatoire of Antwerp. After teaching music in Antwerp schools during the First World War, he became a teacher of solfège at this conservatory. In 1934, he was promoted to teacher of counterpoint and fugue.

Candael is best known as a composer: among others, he wrote ballets titled De zeven hoofdzonden (1927) and Het Hooglied (1936), and the oratorio Het Marialeven (1941–1943). Het Marialeven was based on a text by Candael's friend Maurice Gilliams. This composition was made into a movie by BRT.
