= Marie-Georges-Gérard-Léon le Maire de Warzée d'Hermalle =

Belgian nobleman and diplomat

Marie-Georges-Gérard-Léon le Maire de Warzée d'Hermalle, Baron de Warzée d'Hermalle (10 November 1877, Liège, Belgium – 9 July 1931, Beijing, China) was a Belgian nobleman and diplomat.

He was born on 10 November 1877 at Liège into a noble Belgian family, the son of Marie-Léon-Hubert le Maire Warzée d'Hermalle (born 1848) and Noëmie Constance Caroline Georgine Valérie de Warzée d'Hermalle (born in Beaufays in 1850). He married Dorothy Davis, daughter of Irish writer Owen Hall, in London on 19 April 1902. The couple had two children: Diane and Guy. He died in Beijing, China on 9 July 1931.

He worked in the diplomatic corps of Belgium, attending various disarmament conferences after World War I and later appointed as Ambassador to Iran (after which his wife's impressions of the country were published as Peeps into Persia, 1913), as Ambassador to Japan, and lastly as Ambassador to China (from November 1924). He died in China.
