= 1880 Belgian general election =

- 8 June 1880

66 of the 132 seats in the Chamber of Representatives 67 seats needed for a majority
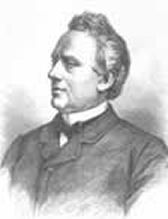

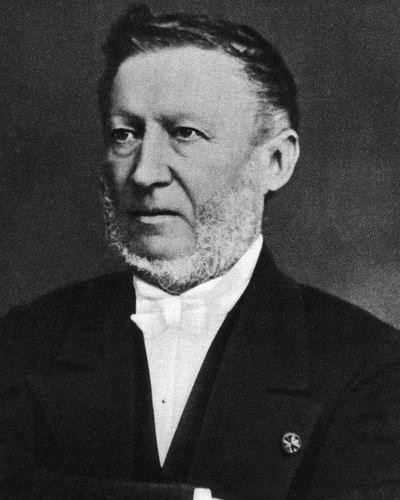
	First party	Second party
Leader	Walthère Frère-Orban	Jules Malou
Party	Liberal	Catholic
Leader since	Candidate for PM	Candidate for PM
Seats before	72 seats	60 seats
Seats won	26	40
Seats after	74	58
Seat change	▲2	▼2
Popular vote	21,283	20,700
Percentage	50.31%	48.94%
Government before election
Frère-Orban II
Liberal
Government after election
Frère-Orban II
Liberal

Partial general elections were held in Belgium on 8 June 1880. In the elections for the Chamber of Representatives the result was a victory for the Liberal Party, which won 74 of the 132 seats. Voter turnout was 67.2%, although only 62,936 people were eligible to vote.

Under the alternating system, elections were only held in five out of the nine provinces: Antwerp, Brabant, Luxembourg, Namur and West Flanders.

A special election was held on 21 August 1880 to elect a representative for the arrondissement of Oudenaarde following the death of Auguste Devos on 21 July 1880. Florent De Bleeckere was elected to succeed him.

== Results ==
=== Chamber of Representatives ===
Party	Votes	%	Seats		
Party	Votes	%	Won	Total	+/–
Liberal Party	21,283	50.31	26	74	+2
Catholic Party	20,700	48.94	40	58	–2
Others	318	0.75	0	0	New
Total	42,301	100.00	66	132	0
Total votes	42,301	–			
Registered voters/turnout	62,936	67.21			
Source: Mackie & Rose, Sternberger et al.
