= Joseph Gustave Ernest Allard =

Belgian politician (1840–1878)

Personal details
- Born: 2 April 1840
- Died: 7 August 1878 (aged 38)

Joseph Gustave Ernest Allard (2 April 1840 - 7 August 1878) was a Belgian politician. He was a member of the Chamber of Representatives.
