= Siege of Tournai =

Tournai in Wallonia, Belgium, has been sieged multiple times, including:

- Siege of Tournai (1197): The Count of Flanders and Hainault, Baldwin VI of Hainaut unsuccessfully besieged it.
- Siege of Tournai (1213): Infante Ferdinand, husband of Jeanne, Countess of Flanders, besieged and took the city on 1 October 1213
- Siege of Tournai (1303): during the Franco-Flemish War, besieged by Flemish troops, siege ended by a treaty
- Siege of Tournai (1340): during the Hundred Years' War, the city was unsuccessfully besieged by the English and their Flemish allies
- Siege of Tournai (1513): during Henry VIII of England's campaigns against France
- Siege of Tournai (1521): during the Italian War of 1521–1526, the city was taken from the French by the Holy Roman Empire
- Siege of Tournai (1581): during the Eighty Years' War, the Spanish Habsburg troops of Alexander Farnese, Duke of Parma took the city from Netherlandish rebels united in the Union of Utrecht
- Siege of Tournai (1667): during the War of Devolution
- Siege of Tournai (1709): during the War of the Spanish Succession
- Siege of Tournai (1745): during the War of the Austrian Succession, key event surrounding the Battle of Fontenoy

== See also ==
- Battle of Tournay (1794)
