= Pierre Charles (Jesuit) =

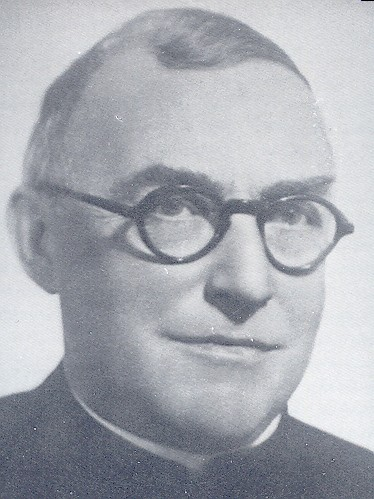
- Born: Pierre Charles; 3 July 1883; Schaerbeek, Belgium
- Died: 11 February 1954 (aged 70); Louvain, Belgium
- Occupations: Priest, philosopher, theologian

Pierre Charles (3 July 1883 – 11 February 1954) was a Belgian Jesuit priest, philosopher and theologian. He is particularly remembered for animating the Semaine missiologique de Louvain (Louvain Missiology week).

== Biography ==
=== Early formation ===
After studies at the St Michael College, Brussels, Pierre entered the noviciate of the Society of Jesus on 23 September 1899, at Tronchiennes. The initial spiritual formation completed, it was clear that he would be destined for intellectual work in the Society of Jesus. For his years of theological training (1907-1910) the young Jesuit was in Hastings (England) where the French Jesuits had their theologate in exile. He had among his professors Léonce de Grandmaison and Albert Condamin and as companions: Pierre Rousselot, Joseph Huby, Auguste Valensin, Paul Doncœur and Pierre Teilhard de Chardin. He was ordained priest (along with his brother Jean) on 24 August 1910, in Louvain (Belgium). This was followed by another year of theology.

The last year of Jesuit formation, known as "tertianship", was made under the direction of Father August Petit, in Tronchiennes (1911-1912). During a further two years of theological specialization at the University of Louvain he went to Paris where he studied at the Catholic Institute, the Sorbonne, the College of France, and the School of higher studies. He attended the classes of Henri Bergson and Victor Delbos.

=== Career ===
Pierre Charles was a professor of dogmatic theology for the rest of his life in the Jesuit theologate of Louvain. As a teacher he captivated his students and, although he taught almost all theological treatises, his favourite was that of the Incarnation. Solidly based on a deep knowledge of philosophy and theology, and enlivened by deep personal conviction, was always oriented towards a synthesis. His original approach and ideas crystallized in his best-selling book of meditations: ‘La prière de toutes les heures’, published in 1924.

=== "Missiology" pioneer ===
Possibly incited by the encyclical Maximum Illud of Benedict XV (1919) he turned his attention to missionary issues. From 1923, responding to requests coming from the Lemfu Seminary - first ever training centre for seminarians of the Belgian Congo - Charles launches the "Xaveriana" collection, a series of pamphlets that dealt with aspects of missionary life and activities, starting with down-to-earth pastoral issues: polygamy, sorcery, etc. Since then, he has endeavoured to develop a "Missiology", to the point that it was fully accepted as one of the theological subjects in Louvain. If not the first in the Catholic Church, Charles stands however as unique in the French speaking theological area.

From its early years (the first Semaine... in 1923) Charles was a promoter of the Semaine missiologique de Louvain which had been established by Albert Lallemand (1890–1966)

In 1926, Charles began the publication of dossiers de l'Action Missionnaire, a means for the dissemination of important documents on missionary problems. It maintained that the essential work of the missions was, in the first place, to "plant" the Church. This is why their primary objective was the establishment of the native clergy.

After some Advent sermons preached to the students of Louvain, he founded with a group of them the Association Universitaire Catholique pour l'Aide aux missions [AUCAM], which would eventually mature into an organization to form African health assistants, and another sister organization "for the scientific progress of agriculture". These associations helped establish (1940) the first Congolese University level institute (which developed into the Lovanium University).

In response to multiple requests, he travelled a lot, and his knowledge of mission lands and their peoples taught him how to collaborate with national and international agencies. Charles gave also numerous retreats to priests and religious, enjoying it, because he could better expose his ideas than in pulpit preaching. He was a distinguished professor and theologian, lecturer and writer, and acknowledged as a Missiology pioneer, particularly in the French speaking area of Europe, and founder of partnerships to assist mission initiatives.

Pierre Charles died in the Jesuit theologate of Louvain on 11 February 1954.

== Writings ==
- La robe sans couture, Louvain, 1923
- La prière de toutes les heures (3 vol.), Brussels, 1924
- La prière missionnaire, Paris, 1935
- Dossiers de l'action missionnaire, Louvain, 1939
- Missiologie, Paris, 1939
- Les protocoles des sages de Sion, Paris, 1939
- La prière de toutes les choses, Brussels, 1947
- Études missiologiques, Bruges, 1956
- L'Église, sacrement du monde, Bruges, 1960

== Bibliography ==
- Jean Levie: In memoriam : le père Pierre Charles, in Nouvelle Revue théologique, vol. 76, 1954, p. 254-273.
- H.P., Reverend Pierre Charles, S.J., in: Catholic Authors, ed. Matthew Hoehn, St. Mary's Abbey, 1952, p. 88–90.
- S. Brown, Fr. Pierre Charles, in R. Nash (éd), Jesuits, Dublin, 1956.
