= Gustave Den Duyts =

Belgian painter (1850–1897)

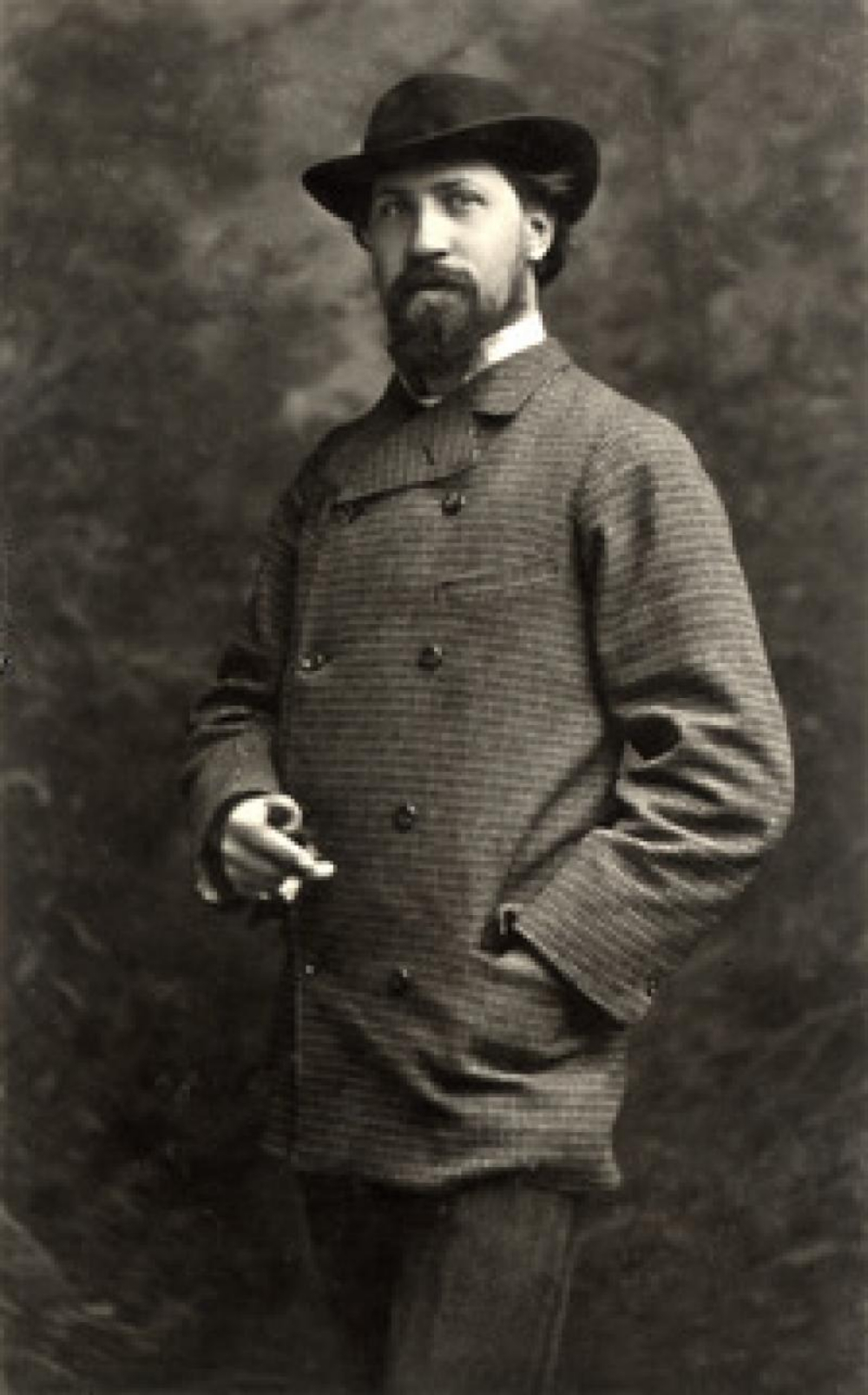
- Self portrait of Gustave Den Duyts
- Born: Gustaaf Den Duyts; 22 October 1850; Ghent, Belgium
- Died: 13 February 1897 (aged 46); Brussels, Belgium
- Education: Netherlands Institute for Art History; Nijverheidsschool (Industrial School) in Ghent
- Occupations: Painter, pastelist and etcher
- Parent: Charles Den Duyts
- Relatives: Charles (son) Gustave (grandson) Frans Den Duyts (grandfather)

Gustave Den Duyts or Gustaaf Den Duyts (22 October 1850 - 13 February 1897) was a Belgian painter, watercolourist, pastelist, etcher and graphic artist, known for his landscapes, cityscapes, marines and still lifes. Den Duyts was also active as a designer of floats for historical parades.

== Biography ==
He was born in Ghent into an art-loving family, the son of draughtsman Charles Den Duyts. His grandfather Frans Den Duyts was appointed in 1824 as Custodian of Collections of the (newly founded) Ghent University and in 1832 as Custodian of the Collection of Commemorative Medals and Antiquities of the University. In that role he had published a book on old coins and commemorative medals which he illustrated with lithographs designed by his son Charles (the father of Gustave). Charles may have been the first art teacher of his son, although he died when Gustave was only 10 years old.

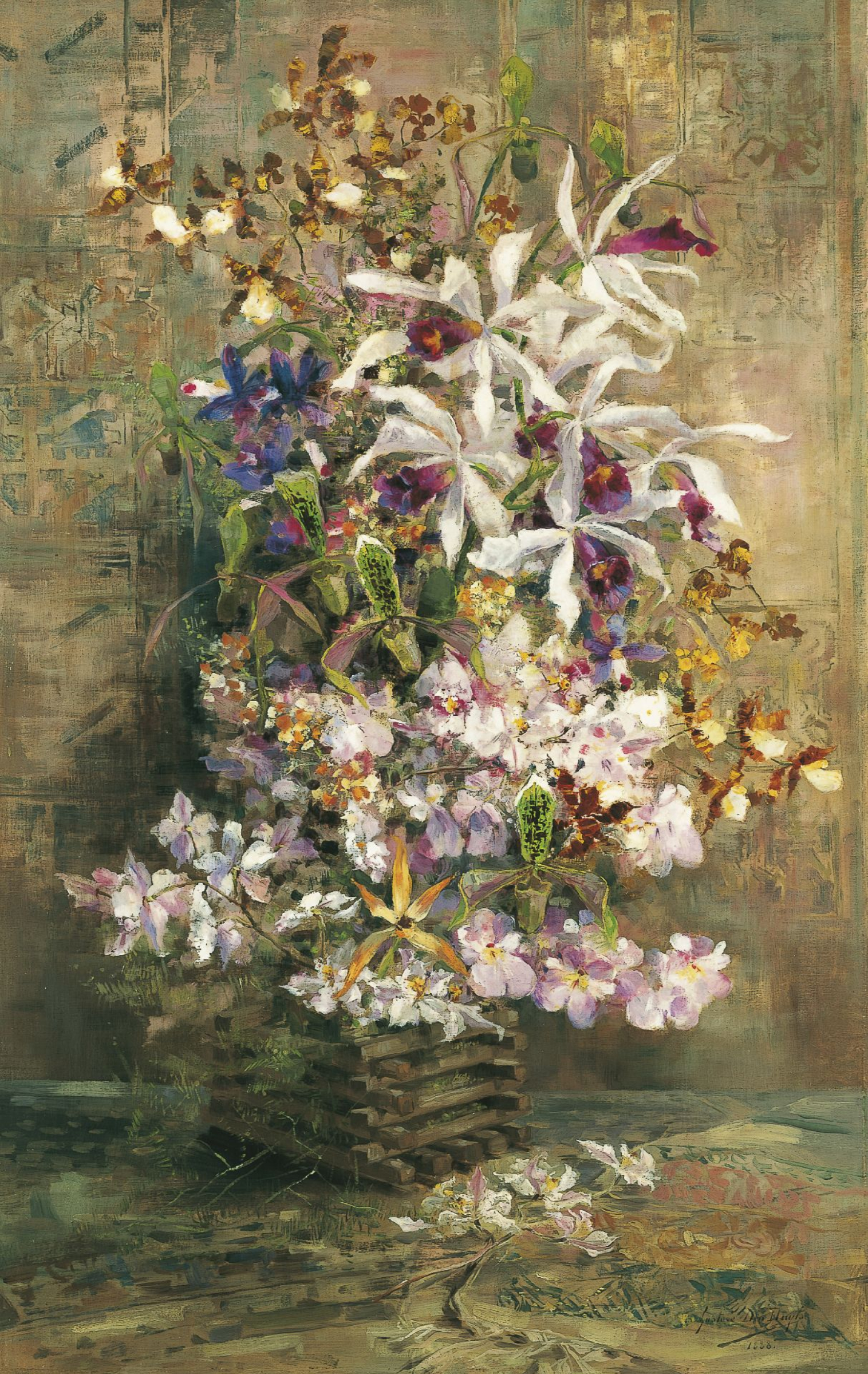
Still life with orchids

Although his artistic talent was evident from a young age he was largely self-taught. He studied in the department of weaving at the Nijverheidsschool (Industrial School) in Ghent where he received some drawing classes. Initially opting for a career in industry he decided at the age of 24 to become an artist.

He set up in a small studio in the centre of Ghent with Jean Delvin, an artist who became later the director of the Ghent Academy of Fine Arts. In 1874 he participated for the first time in the Triennial Art Salon of Ghent with two paintings. He attended the life model classes organised by the Gentse Kunstgenootschap (Art Society ). He attended activities organised by the Cercle Artistique et Littéraire, a local artists' society in Ghent. This offered him the opportunity to meet art collectors such as the influential Fernand Scribe.

His graphic work quickly gained attention. In 1875 his etchings Hoeve in Vlaanderen (Farm in Flanders) and Boerenstulp te Groenendael (Farmhouse in Groenendael) were awarded prizes in a competition organized by the journal "Journal des Beaux-Arts" published in Brussels. This helped launch his career. At the Fifth Exhibition of the Vereniging der Gentsche Kunstoefenaren, (Association of artists from Ghent), where he exhibited together with Jean Delvin, his painting was criticised as being too modern. The art critic complained that its indefinite forms forced the viewer to squint in order to make it out. This vagueness of definition is now regarded as evidence that Den Duyts was a pioneer of Flemish impressionism.

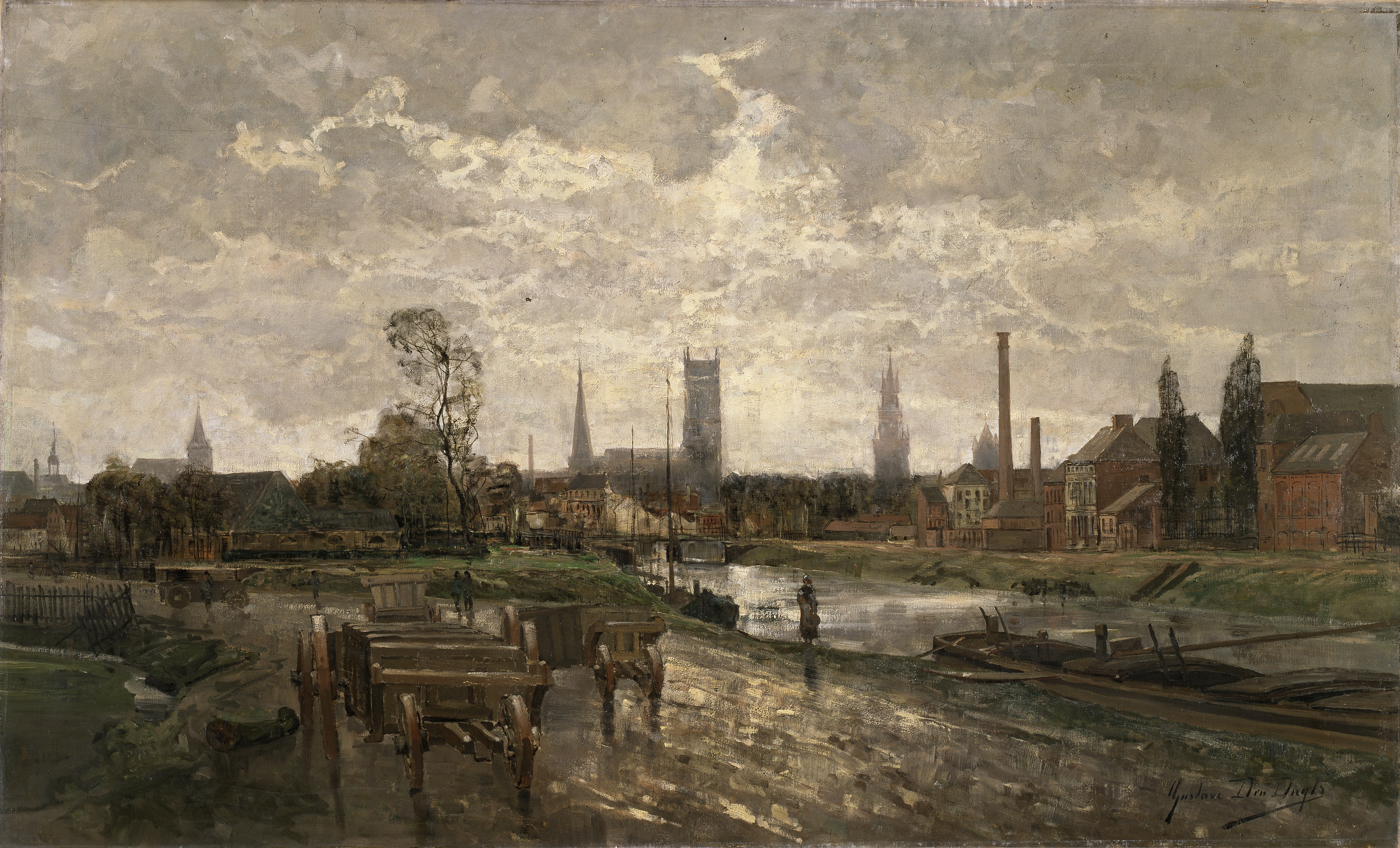
Panoramic View of Ghent

Until 1880 Den Duyts continued his studies in the Art Society and Cercle Artistique in Ghent, where he maintained close contact with Jean Delvin and Armand Heins. Together they became the main members of Ghent's art life in the 1870s.

In 1877 he won a medal at the Paris Salon and in 1881 the Ghent Museum of Fine Arts acquired his Panoramic View of Ghent.

In 1883, Den Duyts contracted pneumonia, which degenerated into a chronic lung disease from which he suffered for the rest of his life. Feeling misunderstood in Ghent, he left in 1887 to settle in Brussels. He continued to exhibit at the Triennial Salons of Ghent in both 1892 and 1895. In 1892 he was awarded the honorary diploma of the Dresden Art Society after an international exhibition of watercolors, etchings, pastels and drawings.

He died in Brussels in 1897. He had married in 1895 and his daughter was born after his death.

== Work ==
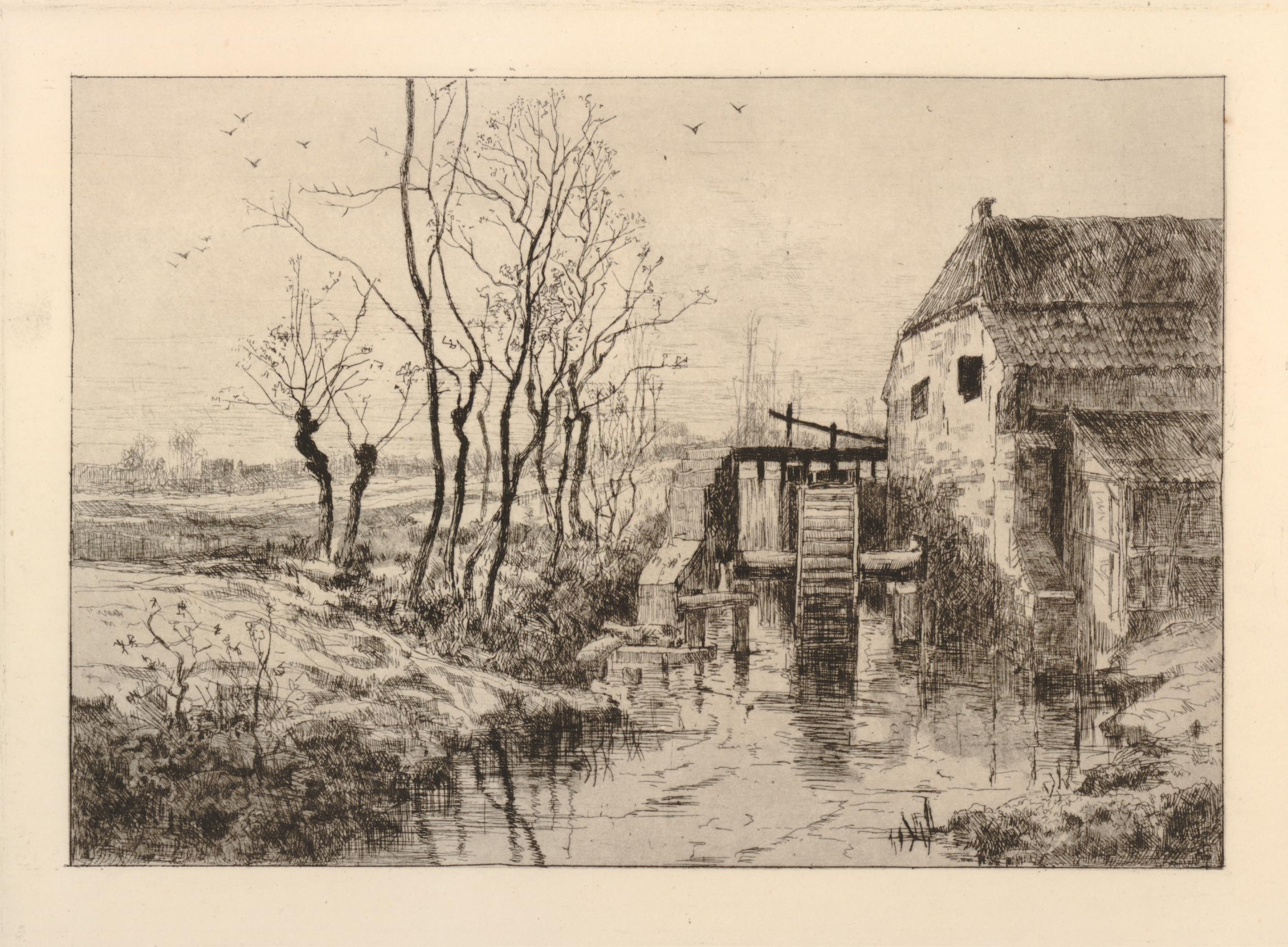
Landscape with a stream with a water-mill

A majority of his works depicted townscapes and landscapes with a melancholic feeling, often with a setting sun or a rising moon and typically set in autumn or winter. The landscapes are usually bare, skeletal and stylized, betraying the fact that he was a skilled etcher, but never detailed. Human or animal figures are not sharply defined but appear to dissolve into the background.

As a result of his illness, from 1889 he did more work in his studio, such as portraits and still lifes.

Den Duyts was also active as a designer of floats for historical parades. In the execution of such commissions from local administrations he started with antiquarian inquiries regarding the exactness of the costumes, folk customs and scenery. He took care of the complete organization of the part assigned to him. He created floats for the three-hundredth anniversary of the Pacification of Ghent in 1876. He designed floats for the fiftieth anniversary of Belgium in 1880 . In 1890, he worked on a historical procession of the sixteenth century on the occasion of the sixtieth anniversary of Belgium and the inauguration of the statues on the Egmont Square on the Petit Sablon.
