= Hendrik De Vocht =

Belgian academic

Hendrik Alfons De Vocht (1878–1962), sometimes Henry or Henri, was a pioneer in the academic study of Renaissance Latin texts from the Low Countries.

== Life ==
De Vocht was born in Turnhout, Belgium, on 15 July 1878, the son of Joannes Baptista De Vocht and Anna Cornelia Oomen. He went to secondary school in Turnhout and Herentals before entering the Major Seminary in Mechelen in 1897. He was ordained to the priesthood on 20 September 1902 and studied at the Catholic University of Leuven, graduating with a doctorate in Germanic Philology on 17 July 1906. Part of his doctoral research was published in 1908 under the title De invloed van Erasmus op de Engelsche Toonneelliteratuur in de XVIe en XVIIe eeuwen (Erasmus's influence on English drama of the 16th and 17th centuries).

From 1912 he taught English literature at Leuven University, but spending much of the First World War in Brussels, teaching English at an evening school in Jette and studying the archive of the Old University of Leuven in the National Archives of Belgium. In 1918 he was appointed a full professor in Leuven, and in 1921 a knight in the Order of Leopold. On 26 December 1925 he was appointed to an honorary canonry of Mechelen Cathedral. In 1930 he undertook a study tour of libraries and archives in Germany, Scandinavia and Switzerland, and in 1931 in Poland. In 1932 he became an honorary doctor of the University of Tartu. He retired in 1950. In June 1958 he was appointed a domestic prelate by Pope Pius XII. He died in Leuven on 17 July 1962 and was buried in the cemetery of Park Abbey. After his death, his extensive library of about 2,600 volumes was added to KU Leuven Libraries.

== Publications ==
- An English Grammar for the Lower Forms (1907)
- Deutsche Schulgrammatik (1910)
- A Knack to Know an Honest Man 1596 (1910)
- Jasper Heywood and his Translations of Seneca's Troas, Thyestes and Hercules Furens (1913)
- La langue, la littérature et les écrivains anglais (1917)
- English Pronunciation (1919)
- A Handbook of English Grammar for Belgian Students (1923)
- Inventaire des archives de l'Université de Louvain 1426–1797 aux Archives Générales du Royaume à Bruxelles (1927)
- John Ford's Dramatic Works (1927)
- Litterae ad Craneveldium (1928)
- The Earliest English Translations of Erasmus' Colloquia 1536–1566 (1928)
- The Earliest English Translations of Erasmus' Diuersoriam 1566 (1928)
- Monvmenta Hvmanistica Lovaniensia: Texts and Studies about Louvain Humanists in the First Half of the XVIth Century (1934)
- Erasme. Sa vie et son oeuvre (1935)
- Jerome de Busleyden, Founder of the Louvain Collegium Trilingue. His Life and Writings (1950)
- History of the Foundation and the Rise of the Collegium Trilingue Lovaniense, 1517–1550 (4 vols, 1951–1954)
