= Henri Julien Allard =

Belgian politician (1803–1882)

Personal details
- Born: 12 June 1803 Tournai, Hainaut, France (now in Belgium)
- Died: 17 November 1882 (aged 79) Tournai, Hainaut, Belgium

Henri Julien Allard (12 June 1803 – 17 November 1882) was a Belgian politician. He was a member of the Chamber of Representatives.

He was the son of Belgian politician and lawyer Lactance Allard and Sophie Joseph Vinchent.
