= Turnhout (Chamber of Representatives constituency) =

Belgian political subdivision

Turnhout was a constituency used to elect members of the Belgian Chamber of Representatives between 1831 and 1995.

== Representatives ==
| Election | Representative (Party) | Representative (Party) | Representative (Party) | Representative (Party) | Representative (Party) | Representative (Party) | Representative (Party) | Representative (Party) |
|---|---|---|---|---|---|---|---|---|
| 1831 | Charles Rogier (Liberal) | Pierre-Jean Denef (Catholic) | 2 seats | | | | | |
| 1833 | Charles Rogier (Liberal) | Pierre-Jean Denef (Catholic) | 2 seats | | | | | |
| 1837 | Pierre-Egide Peeters (Catholic) | Pierre-Jean Denef (Catholic) | 2 seats | | | | | |
| 1841 | Albéric du Bus de Gisignies (Catholic) | François Louis Joseph Du Bus (Catholic) | 2 seats | | | | | |
| 1845 | Albéric du Bus de Gisignies (Catholic) | François Louis Joseph Du Bus (Catholic) | 2 seats | | | | | |
| 1848 | Charles de Merode-Westerloo (Catholic) | Jean-Baptiste Coomans (Catholic) | 2 seats | | | | | |
| 1852 | Charles de Merode-Westerloo (Catholic) | Jean-Baptiste Coomans (Catholic) | 2 seats | | | | | |
| 1856 | Charles de Merode-Westerloo (Catholic) | Jean-Baptiste Coomans (Catholic) | 2 seats | | | | | |
| 1857 | Charles de Merode-Westerloo (Catholic) | Jean-Baptiste Coomans (Catholic) | Alphonse Nothomb (Catholic) | 3 seats | | | | |
| 1861 | Charles de Merode-Westerloo (Catholic) | Jean-Baptiste Coomans (Catholic) | Alphonse Nothomb (Catholic) | 3 seats | | | | |
| 1864 | Eugène de Zerezo de Téjada (Catholic) | Jean-Baptiste Coomans (Catholic) | Alphonse Nothomb (Catholic) | 3 seats | | | | |
| 1868 | Eugène de Zerezo de Téjada (Catholic) | Jean-Baptiste Coomans (Catholic) | Alphonse Nothomb (Catholic) | 3 seats | | | | |
| 1870 | Eugène de Zerezo de Téjada (Catholic) | Jean-Baptiste Coomans (Catholic) | Alphonse Nothomb (Catholic) | 3 seats | | | | |
| 1874 | Eugène de Zerezo de Téjada (Catholic) | Jean-Baptiste Coomans (Catholic) | Alphonse Nothomb (Catholic) | 3 seats | | | | |
| 1878 | Eugène de Zerezo de Téjada (Catholic) | Jean-Baptiste Coomans (Catholic) | Alphonse Nothomb (Catholic) | 3 seats | | | | |
| 1882 | Eugène de Zerezo de Téjada (Catholic) | Jean-Baptiste Coomans (Catholic) | Alphonse Nothomb (Catholic) | 3 seats | | | | |
| 1886 | Petrus Dierckx (Catholic) | Jean-Baptiste Coomans (Catholic) | Alphonse Nothomb (Catholic) | 3 seats | | | | |
| 1890 | Petrus Dierckx (Catholic) | Jean-Baptiste Coomans (Catholic) | Alphonse Nothomb (Catholic) | 3 seats | | | | |
| 1892 | Petrus Dierckx (Catholic) | Jean-Baptiste Coomans (Catholic) | Charles de Broqueville (Catholic) | 3 seats | | | | |
| 1894 | Petrus Dierckx (Catholic) | Henri de Merode-Westerloo (Catholic) | Charles de Broqueville (Catholic) | 3 seats | | | | |
| 1898 | Petrus Dierckx (Catholic) | Henri de Merode-Westerloo (Catholic) | Charles de Broqueville (Catholic) | 3 seats | | | | |
| 1900 | Alphonse Versteylen (Catholic) | Remi Le Paige (Catholic) | Charles de Broqueville (Catholic) | 3 seats | | | | |
| 1904 | Alphonse Versteylen (Catholic) | Remi Le Paige (Catholic) | Charles de Broqueville (Catholic) | 3 seats | | | | |
| 1908 | Alphonse Versteylen (Catholic) | Remi Le Paige (Catholic) | Charles de Broqueville (Catholic) | 3 seats | | | | |
| 1912 | Alphonse Versteylen (Catholic) | Remi Le Paige (Catholic) | Charles de Broqueville (Catholic) | Joseph Verachtert (Catholic) | 4 seats | | | |
| 1919 | Alphonse Homans (Liberal) | Alphonse Van Hoeck (Catholic) | Jan-Baptist Rombauts (Catholic) | Joseph Verachtert (Catholic) | 4 seats | | | |
| 1921 | Louis Boone (Catholic) | Alphonse Van Hoeck (Catholic) | Jan-Baptist Rombauts (Catholic) | Joseph Verachtert (Catholic) | 4 seats | | | |
| 1925 | Thomas Debacker (Frontpartij) | Alphonse Van Hoeck (Catholic) | Jan-Baptist Rombauts (Catholic) | Joseph Verachtert (Catholic) | 4 seats | | | |
| 1929 | Thomas Debacker (Frontpartij) | Alphonse Van Hoeck (Catholic) | Jan-Baptist Rombauts (Catholic) | Armand van der Gracht de Rommerswael (PS) | 4 seats | | | |
| 1932 | Thomas Debacker (Frontpartij) | Alphonse Van Hoeck (Catholic) | Jan-Baptist Rombauts (Catholic) | Augustinus Hens (PS) | 4 seats | | | |
| 1936 | Thomas Debacker (Frontpartij) | Alphonse Van Hoeck (Catholic) | Jan-Baptist Rombauts (Catholic) | Augustinus Hens (PS) | Karel Pelgroms (VNV) | 5 seats | | |
| 1939 | Thomas Debacker (Frontpartij) | Alphonse Van Hoeck (Catholic) | Jan-Baptist Rombauts (Catholic) | Augustinus Hens (PS) | Leo De Peuter (Catholic) | 5 seats | | |
| 1946 | Arthur Janssens (CVP) | Frans Goelen (CVP) | Lode Peeters (CVP) | Augustinus Hens (PS) | Octaaf Verboven (CVP) | 5 seats | | |
| 1949 | Julius Mertens (CVP) | Kamiel Berghmans (CVP) | Lode Peeters (CVP) | Augustinus Hens (PS) | Octaaf Verboven (CVP) | Leo De Peuter (CVP) | 6 seats | |
| 1950 | Julius Mertens (CVP) | Kamiel Berghmans (CVP) | Lode Peeters (CVP) | Augustinus Hens (PS) | Octaaf Verboven (CVP) | Leo De Peuter (CVP) | 6 seats | |
| 1954 | Julius Mertens (CVP) | Kamiel Berghmans (CVP) | Lode Peeters (CVP) | Josse Van Heupen (BSP) | Octaaf Verboven (CVP) | Francis Tanghe (CVP) | 6 seats | |
| 1958 | Julius Mertens (CVP) | Kamiel Berghmans (CVP) | Lode Peeters (CVP) | Josse Van Heupen (BSP) | Octaaf Verboven (CVP) | Francis Tanghe (CVP) | 6 seats | |
| 1961 | Julius Mertens (CVP) | Kamiel Berghmans (CVP) | Lode Peeters (CVP) | Josse Van Heupen (BSP) | Octaaf Verboven (CVP) | Francis Tanghe (CVP) | 6 seats | |
| 1965 | Frans Van Mechelen (CVP) | Kamiel Berghmans (CVP) | Renaat Peeters (CVP) | Josse Van Heupen (BSP) | Jozef Cools (BSP) | Francis Tanghe (CVP) | Paul De Clercq (PVV) | 7 seats |
| 1968 | Frans Van Mechelen (CVP) | Jos De Seranno (CVP) | Renaat Peeters (CVP) | Jozef Belmans (VU) | Jozef Cools (BSP) | Francis Tanghe (CVP) | Robert Van Rompaey (CVP) | 7 seats |
| 1971 | Frans Van Mechelen (CVP) | Peter Poortmans (PVV) | Renaat Peeters (CVP) | Jozef Belmans (VU) | Jozef Cools (BSP) | Francis Tanghe (CVP) | Robert Van Rompaey (CVP) | 7 seats |
| 1974 | Jos Dupré (CVP) | Paul De Clercq (PVV) | Renaat Peeters (CVP) | Jozef Belmans (VU) | Jeanne Huybrechts-Adriaensens (BSP) | Francis Tanghe (CVP) | Jeanne Janssen-Peeraer (CVP) | 7 seats |
| 1977 | Jos Dupré (CVP) | Peter Poortmans (PVV) | Renaat Peeters (CVP) | Jozef Belmans (VU) | Jeanne Huybrechts-Adriaensens (BSP) | Francis Tanghe (CVP) | Robert Van Rompaey (CVP) | 7 seats |
| 1978 | Jos Dupré (CVP) | Willy Taelman (PVV) | Renaat Peeters (CVP) | Jef Sleeckx (BSP) | Jeanne Huybrechts-Adriaensens (BSP) | Francis Tanghe (CVP) | Robert Van Rompaey (CVP) | 7 seats |
| 1981 | Jos Dupré (CVP) | Willy Taelman (PVV) | Renaat Peeters (CVP) | Jef Sleeckx (BSP) | Jozef Belmans (VU) | Hugo Van Rompaey (CVP) | Zefa Raeymaekers (CVP) | 7 seats |
| 1985 | Jos Dupré (CVP) | Willy Taelman (PVV) | Renaat Peeters (CVP) | Jef Sleeckx (BSP) | Jozef Belmans (VU) | Hugo Van Rompaey (CVP) | Zefa Raeymaekers (CVP) | Aloïs Beckers (PS) |
| 1988 | Jos Dupré (CVP) | Willy Taelman (PVV) | Annie Leysen (CVP) | Jef Sleeckx (BSP) | Jos Geysels (Agalev) | Hugo Van Rompaey (CVP) | Jef Van Looy (CVP) | Aloïs Beckers (PS) |
| 1991 | Jos Dupré (CVP) | Willy Taelman (PVV) | Annie Leysen (CVP) | Jef Sleeckx (BSP) | Jos Geysels (Agalev) | John Spinnewyn (VB) | Jef Van Looy (CVP) | Jan Peeters (PS) |
| 1995 | Merged into Mechelen-Turnhout | | | | | | | |
