= Aalst (Chamber of Representatives constituency) =

Constituency in Belgium (1831–1991)

Aalst was a constituency used to elect members of the Belgian Chamber of Representatives between 1831 and 1991.

== Representatives ==
Election	Representative (Party)	Representative (Party)	Representative (Party)	Representative (Party)	Representative (Party)	Representative (Party)
1831	Antoine de Meer de Moorsel (Catholic)	Eugène De Smet (Catholic)	Jean De Witte (Catholic)	3 seats		
1833	Antoine de Meer de Moorsel (Catholic)	Eugène De Smet (Catholic)	François Van den Bossche (Catholic)	3 seats		
1837	Antoine de Meer de Moorsel (Catholic)	Eugène De Smet (Catholic)	François Van den Bossche (Catholic)	3 seats		
1841	Antoine de Meer de Moorsel (Catholic)	Eugène De Smet (Catholic)	Jean De Naeyer (Catholic)	3 seats		
1845	Adrien Bruneau (Liberal)	Jean-François Van Cleemputte (Liberal)	Pierre Jean De Clippele (Catholic)	3 seats		
1848	Adrien Bruneau (Liberal)	Jean-François Van Cleemputte (Liberal)	Charles Cumont (Liberal)	3 seats		
1852	Auguste De Portemont (Catholic)	Mathieu de Ruddere de te Lokeren (Catholic)	Charles Cumont (Liberal)	3 seats		
1856	Auguste De Portemont (Catholic)	Mathieu de Ruddere de te Lokeren (Catholic)	Jean De Naeyer (Catholic)	3 seats		
1857	Auguste De Portemont (Catholic)	Mathieu de Ruddere de te Lokeren (Catholic)	Jean De Naeyer (Catholic)	3 seats		
1861	Charles Cumont (Liberal)	Mathieu de Ruddere de te Lokeren (Catholic)	Jean De Naeyer (Catholic)	3 seats		
1864	Albert Liénart (Catholic)	Victor Van Wambeke (Catholic)	Jean De Naeyer (Catholic)	3 seats		
1868	Albert Liénart (Catholic)	Victor Van Wambeke (Catholic)	Jean De Naeyer (Catholic)	3 seats		
1870	Charles Verbrugghen (Catholic)	Victor Van Wambeke (Catholic)	Jean De Naeyer (Catholic)	3 seats		
1874	Charles Verbrugghen (Catholic)	Victor Van Wambeke (Catholic)	Charles Woeste (Catholic)	3 seats		
1878	Charles Verbrugghen (Catholic)	Victor Van Wambeke (Catholic)	Charles Woeste (Catholic)	3 seats		
1882	Charles Verbrugghen (Catholic)	Victor Van Wambeke (Catholic)	Charles Woeste (Catholic)	Louis De Sadeleer (Catholic)	4 seats	
1886	Charles Verbrugghen (Catholic)	Victor Van Wambeke (Catholic)	Charles Woeste (Catholic)	Louis De Sadeleer (Catholic)	4 seats	
1890	Charles Verbrugghen (Catholic)	Victor Van Wambeke (Catholic)	Charles Woeste (Catholic)	Louis De Sadeleer (Catholic)	4 seats	
1892	Charles Verbrugghen (Catholic)	Victor Van Wambeke (Catholic)	Charles Woeste (Catholic)	Louis De Sadeleer (Catholic)	4 seats	
1894	Adolf Daens (Daensist)	Vincent Diericx (Catholic)	Charles Woeste (Catholic)	Louis De Sadeleer (Catholic)	4 seats	
1898	Arthur Vanderlinden (Catholic)	Léon de Bethune (Catholic)	Charles Woeste (Catholic)	Louis De Sadeleer (Catholic)	4 seats	
1900	Paul Piéraert (Catholic)	Léon de Bethune (Catholic)	Charles Woeste (Catholic)	Louis De Sadeleer (Catholic)	Aloys De Backer (Daensist)	5 seats
1904	Paul Piéraert (Catholic)	Jules Rens (Liberal)	Charles Woeste (Catholic)	Louis De Sadeleer (Catholic)	Pieter Daens (Daensist)	5 seats
1908	Romain Moyersoen (Catholic)	Jules Rens (Liberal)	Charles Woeste (Catholic)	Louis De Sadeleer (Catholic)	Pieter Daens (Daensist)	5 seats
1912	Romain Moyersoen (Catholic)	Jules Rens (Liberal)	Charles Woeste (Catholic)	Louis-Marie de Bethune (Catholic)	Hector Plancquaert (Daensist)	5 seats
1919	Pieter van Schuylenbergh (Catholic)	Alfred Nichels (PS)	Charles Woeste (Catholic)	Louis-Marie de Bethune (Catholic)	Hendrik Borginon (Frontpartij)	5 seats
1921	Pieter van Schuylenbergh (Catholic)	Alfred Nichels (PS)	Ferdinand Van Nieuwenhove (Catholic)	Louis-Marie de Bethune (Catholic)	Hubert Robyn (Liberal)	5 seats
1925	Pieter van Schuylenbergh (Catholic)	Alfred Nichels (PS)	Karel Leopold Van Opdenbosch (Frontpartij)	Louis-Marie de Bethune (Catholic)	Prosper De Bruyn (PS)	5 seats
1929	Pieter van Schuylenbergh (Catholic)	Alfred Nichels (PS)	Karel Leopold Van Opdenbosch (Frontpartij)	Adiel Debeuckelaere (Frontpartij)	Prosper De Bruyn (PS)	5 seats
1932	Pieter van Schuylenbergh (Catholic)	Alfred Nichels (PS)	Karel Leopold Van Opdenbosch (Frontpartij)	Albert Van Hecke (Catholic)	Clément Behn (Liberal)	5 seats
1936	Pieter van Schuylenbergh (Catholic)	Alfred Nichels (PS)	Karel Leopold Van Opdenbosch (Frontpartij)	Albert Van Hecke (Catholic)	Clément Behn (Liberal)	Albert D'Haese (VNV)
1939	Pieter van Schuylenbergh (Catholic)	Alfred Nichels (PS)	Prosper De Bruyn (PS)	Karel Fransman (Catholic)	Clément Behn (Liberal)	Ernest Van den Berghe (VNV)
1946	Albert Van Hoorick (PCB)	Albert Vanden Berghe (CVP)	Eugeen Moriau (CVP)	Gustaaf De Ville (PCB)	Ludovic Moyersoen (CVP)	Prosper De Bruyn (BSP)
1949	Louis D'haeseleer (Liberal)	Albert Vanden Berghe (CVP)	Eugeen Moriau (CVP)	Karel Fransman (Catholic)	Ludovic Moyersoen (CVP)	Prosper De Bruyn (BSP)
1950	Louis D'haeseleer (Liberal)	Albert Vanden Berghe (CVP)	Eugeen Moriau (CVP)	Karel Fransman (Catholic)	Ludovic Moyersoen (CVP)	Prosper De Bruyn (BSP)
1954	Louis D'haeseleer (Liberal)	Albert Vanden Berghe (CVP)	Eugeen Moriau (CVP)	Maurice Violon (Liberal)	Ludovic Moyersoen (CVP)	Robert Van Trimpont (BSP)
1958	Louis D'haeseleer (Liberal)	Albert Vanden Berghe (CVP)	Eugeen Moriau (CVP)	Albert Van Hoorick (BSP)	Ludovic Moyersoen (CVP)	Robert Van Trimpont (BSP)
1961	Louis D'haeseleer (Liberal)	Roger Otte (CVP)	Eugeen Moriau (CVP)	Albert Van Hoorick (BSP)	Ludovic Moyersoen (CVP)	Richard Van Leemputten (VU)
1965	Louis D'haeseleer (Liberal)	Roger Otte (CVP)	Louis Waltniel (PVV)	Albert Van Hoorick (BSP)	Ludovic Moyersoen (CVP)	Richard Van Leemputten (VU)
1968	Louis D'haeseleer (Liberal)	Roger Otte (CVP)	Willy Vernimmen (BSP)	Albert Van Hoorick (BSP)	Ghisleen Willems (CVP)	Richard Van Leemputten (VU)
1971	Louis D'haeseleer (Liberal)	Roger Otte (CVP)	Louis Waltniel (PVV)	Albert Van Hoorick (BSP)	Ghisleen Willems (CVP)	Richard Van Leemputten (VU)
1974	Georgette De Kegel (VU)	Roger Otte (CVP)	Diane D'haeseleer (PVV)	Paul Van Der Niepen (BSP)	Ghisleen Willems (CVP)	Richard Van Leemputten (VU)
1977	Jan Caudron (VU)	Roger Otte (CVP)	Diane D'haeseleer (PVV)	Paul Van Der Niepen (BSP)	Ghisleen Willems (CVP)	Marc Galle (BSP)
1978	Jan Caudron (VU)	Roger Otte (CVP)	Willy Van Renterghem (PVV)	Paul Van Der Niepen (BSP)	Ghisleen Willems (CVP)	Marc Galle (BSP)
1981	Jan Caudron (VU)	Hubert Van Wambeke (CVP)	Willy Van Renterghem (PVV)	Herman De Loor (PS)	Ghisleen Willems (CVP)	Marc Galle (BSP)
1985	Jan Caudron (VU)	Hubert Van Wambeke (CVP)	Willy Van Renterghem (PVV)	Herman De Loor (PS)	Ghisleen Willems (CVP)	Marc Galle (BSP)
1988	Jan Caudron (VU)	Hubert Van Wambeke (CVP)	Willy Van Renterghem (PVV)	Dirk Van der Maelen (PS)	Lisette Nelis-Van Liedekerke (CVP)	Jacques Timmermans (PS)
1991	Jan Caudron (VU)	Mark Van der Poorten (CVP)	Annie De Maght (PVV)	Dirk Van der Maelen (PS)	Lisette Nelis-Van Liedekerke (CVP)	Luc Barbé (Agalev)
1995	Merged into Oudenaarde-Aalst					
