= Thuin (Chamber of Representatives constituency) =

Belgian political subdivision

Thuin was a constituency used to elect members of the Belgian Chamber of Representatives between 1831 and 1991 and was merged to Charleroi-Thuin in 1995.

== Representatives ==
Election	Representative (Party)	Representative (Party)	Representative (Party)	Representative (Party)
1831	Alexandre de Robaulx (Liberal)	Pierre Poschet (Catholic)	2 seats	
1833	Edouard Dequesne (Liberal)	Louis Troye (Liberal)	2 seats	
1837	Augustin Puissant (Liberal)	Louis Troye (Liberal)	2 seats	
1841	Joseph de Riquet de Caraman Chimay (Catholic)	Louis Troye (Liberal)	2 seats	
1845	Joseph de Riquet de Caraman Chimay (Catholic)	Louis Troye (Liberal)	2 seats	
1848	Joseph de Riquet de Caraman Chimay (Catholic)	Edouard Dequesne (Liberal)	2 seats	
1852	Joseph de Riquet de Caraman Chimay (Catholic)	Edouard Dequesne (Liberal)	2 seats	
1856	Augustin Licot (Catholic)	Alexandre de Paul de Barchifontaine (Liberal)	2 seats	
1857	Gustave van Leempoel de Nieuwmunster (Liberal)	Alexandre de Paul de Barchifontaine (Liberal)	2 seats	
1861	Gustave van Leempoel de Nieuwmunster (Liberal)	Alexandre de Paul de Barchifontaine (Liberal)	2 seats	
1864	Arthur Warocqué (Liberal)	Gustave Hagemans (Liberal)	Jean-Baptiste T'Serstevens (Liberal)	3 seats
1868	Arthur Warocqué (Liberal)	Gustave Hagemans (Liberal)	Jean-Baptiste T'Serstevens (Liberal)	3 seats
1870	Arthur Warocqué (Liberal)	Gustave Hagemans (Liberal)	Albert Puissant (Liberal)	3 seats
1874	Arthur Warocqué (Liberal)	Gustave Hagemans (Liberal)	Albert Puissant (Liberal)	3 seats
1878	Alphonse de Riquet de Caraman Chimay (Liberal)	Jean-Baptiste T'Serstevens (Liberal)	Albert Puissant (Liberal)	3 seats
1882	Louis Gigot (Liberal)	Jean-Baptiste T'Serstevens (Liberal)	Albert Puissant (Liberal)	3 seats
1886	Louis Gigot (Liberal)	Armand Anspach-Puissant (Liberal)	Georges Warocqué (Liberal)	3 seats
1890	Eugène Derbaix (Catholic)	Armand Anspach-Puissant (Liberal)	Georges Warocqué (Liberal)	3 seats
1892	Louis Cambier (Liberal)	Armand Anspach-Puissant (Liberal)	Georges Warocqué (Liberal)	3 seats
1894	Charles-Maximilien Bailly (Catholic)	Nicolas Berloz (PS)	Georges Warocqué (Liberal)	3 seats
1898	Aristide Walthéry (PS)	Nicolas Berloz (PS)	Georges Grimard (PS)	3 seats
1900	Eugène Derbaix (Catholic)	Nicolas Berloz (PS)	Raoul Warocqué (Liberal)	3 seats
1904	Léon Gendebien (Catholic)	Nicolas Berloz (PS)	Raoul Warocqué (Liberal)	3 seats
1908	Léon Gendebien (Catholic)	Nicolas Berloz (PS)	Raoul Warocqué (Liberal)	3 seats
1912	Léon Gendebien (Catholic)	Nicolas Berloz (PS)	Victor Vilain (Liberal)	3 seats
1919	Léon Gendebien (Catholic)	Nicolas Berloz (PS)	Elie Hainaut (PS)	3 seats
1921	Léon Gendebien (Catholic)	Nicolas Berloz (PS)	Eugène Flagey (Liberal)	3 seats
1925	Léon Gendebien (Catholic)	Nicolas Berloz (PS)	Ernest Petit (PS)	3 seats
1929	Léon Gendebien (Catholic)	Nicolas Berloz (PS)	Ernest Petit (PS)	3 seats
1932	Charles Derbaix (Catholic)	Max Buset (BSP)	Ernest Petit (PS)	3 seats
1936	Arsène Caignet (REX)	Michel Devèze (Liberal)	Ernest Petit (PS)	3 seats
1939	Charles Derbaix (Catholic)	Michel Devèze (Liberal)	Gaston Juste (PS)	3 seats
1946	Ernest Challe (CVP)	Fernand Jacquemotte (PCB)	Gaston Juste (PS)	Max Buset (BSP)
1949	Ernest Challe (CVP)	Fernand Jacquemotte (PCB)	Gaston Juste (PS)	Max Buset (BSP)
1950	Charles Gendebien (CVP)	Henri Dujardin (CVP)	Gaston Juste (PS)	Max Buset (BSP)
1954	Charles Gendebien (CVP)	Noël Duvivier (CVP)	Gaston Juste (PS)	Max Buset (BSP)
1958	Charles Gendebien (CVP)	Noël Duvivier (CVP)	Gaston Juste (PS)	Yvonne Deleau-Prince (BSP)
1961	Willy Frère (PCB)	Noël Duvivier (CVP)	Gaston Juste (PS)	Yvonne Deleau-Prince (BSP)
1965	Jules Herbage (PVV)	Simone Mabille-Leblanc (PVV)	Gaston Juste (PS)	3 seats
1968	Jules Herbage (PVV)	Simone Mabille-Leblanc (PVV)	Gaston Juste (PS)	3 seats
1971	Jules Herbage (PVV)	Paul-Henry Gendebien (RW)	Willy Burgeon (PS)	3 seats
1974	Albert Lernoux (cdH)	Paul-Henry Gendebien (RW)	Willy Burgeon (PS)	3 seats
1977	Albert Lernoux (cdH)	Paul-Henry Gendebien (RW)	Willy Burgeon (PS)	3 seats
1978	Albert Lernoux (cdH)	Paul-Henry Gendebien (RW)	Willy Burgeon (PS)	3 seats
1981	Albert Lernoux (cdH)	Paul Henrotin (PRL)	Willy Burgeon (PS)	3 seats
1985	André Bondroit (PS)	Daniel Ducarme (PRL)	Willy Burgeon (PS)	3 seats
1988	Etienne Bertrand (PRL)	Daniel Ducarme (PRL)	Willy Burgeon (PS)	3 seats
1991	Etienne Bertrand (PRL)	José Canon (PS)	Willy Burgeon (PS)	3 seats
1995	Merged into Charleroi-Thuin			
