= Hasselt (Chamber of Representatives constituency) =

Former Belgian national constituency

Hasselt was a constituency used to elect members of the Belgian Chamber of Representatives between 1831 and 1991.

== Representatives ==
Election	Representative (Party)	Representative (Party)	Representative (Party)	Representative (Party)	Representative (Party)	Representative (Party)	Representative (Party)	Representative (Party)	Representative (Party)
1831	Barthélémy de Theux de Meylandt (Catholic)	Etienne de Stenbier de Wideux (Catholic)	Lambert Raymaeckers (Liberal)						
1833	Barthélémy de Theux de Meylandt (Catholic)	Eugène Pollénus (Catholic)	Lambert Raymaeckers (Liberal)						
1837	Barthélémy de Theux de Meylandt (Catholic)	Eugène Pollénus (Catholic)	Lambert Raymaeckers (Liberal)						
1841	Barthélémy de Theux de Meylandt (Catholic)	Guillaume de Corswarem (Catholic)							
1845	Barthélémy de Theux de Meylandt (Catholic)	Guillaume de Corswarem (Catholic)							
1848	Barthélémy de Theux de Meylandt (Catholic)	Charles de Pitteurs-Hiegaerts (Catholic)							
1852	Barthélémy de Theux de Meylandt (Catholic)	Charles de Pitteurs-Hiegaerts (Catholic)							
1856	Barthélémy de Theux de Meylandt (Catholic)	Charles de Pitteurs-Hiegaerts (Catholic)							
1857	Barthélémy de Theux de Meylandt (Catholic)	Charles de Pitteurs-Hiegaerts (Catholic)							
1861	Barthélémy de Theux de Meylandt (Catholic)	Joseph Thonissen (Catholic)							
1864	Barthélémy de Theux de Meylandt (Catholic)	Joseph Thonissen (Catholic)							
1868	Barthélémy de Theux de Meylandt (Catholic)	Joseph Thonissen (Catholic)							
1870	Barthélémy de Theux de Meylandt (Catholic)	Joseph Thonissen (Catholic)							
1874	Henri de Pitteurs-Hiegaerts (Catholic)	Joseph Thonissen (Catholic)							
1878	Henri de Pitteurs-Hiegaerts (Catholic)	Joseph Thonissen (Catholic)							
1882	Henri de Pitteurs-Hiegaerts (Catholic)	Joseph Thonissen (Catholic)							
1886	Henri de Pitteurs-Hiegaerts (Catholic)	Joseph Thonissen (Catholic)							
1890	Henri de Pitteurs-Hiegaerts (Catholic)	Adrien de Corswarem (Catholic)							
1892	Henri de Pitteurs-Hiegaerts (Catholic)	Adrien de Corswarem (Catholic)	Albert de Theux de Meylandt (Catholic)						
1894	Clément Cartuyvels (Catholic)	Adrien de Corswarem (Catholic)	Albert de Theux de Meylandt (Catholic)						
1898	Clément Cartuyvels (Catholic)	Adrien de Corswarem (Catholic)	Albert de Theux de Meylandt (Catholic)						
1900	Clément Cartuyvels (Catholic)	Adrien de Corswarem (Catholic)	Albert de Theux de Meylandt (Catholic)						
1904	Clément Cartuyvels (Catholic)	Clément Peten (Liberal)	Albert de Theux de Meylandt (Catholic)						
1908	Clément Cartuyvels (Catholic)	Clément Peten (Liberal)	Albert Palmers de Terlaemen (Catholic)						
1912	Jean Ramaekers (Catholic)	Clément Peten (Liberal)	Louis Ooms (Catholic)						
1919	Jean Ramaekers (Catholic)	Clément Peten (Liberal)	Jules Van Caenegem (Catholic)						
1921	Jean Ramaekers (Catholic)	Emile Blavier (Catholic)	Jules Van Caenegem (Catholic)						
1925	Jean Ramaekers (Catholic)	Emile Blavier (Catholic)	Jules Van Caenegem (Catholic)						
1929	Paul Clerckx (Catholic)	Emile Blavier (Catholic)	Jules Van Caenegem (Catholic)						
1932	Paul Clerckx (Catholic)	Emile Blavier (Catholic)	Jules Van Caenegem (Catholic)						
1936	Eugeen Frans Verpoorten (Catholic)	Emile Blavier (Catholic)	Pieter Ghysen (Catholic)	Henricus Ballet (VNV)					
1939	Paul Clerckx (Catholic)	Emile Blavier (Catholic)	Jozef Alfons Hermans (VNV)	Henricus Ballet (VNV)					
1946	Paul Clerckx (Catholic)	Alfred Bertrand (CVP)	Hendrik Beelen (CVP)	Paul Clerckx (CVP)	Raoul Vreven (Liberal)				
1949	Gerard Bijnens (CVP)	Alfred Bertrand (CVP)	Paul Meyers (CVP)	Paul Clerckx (CVP)	Walter-Joseph Thys (BSP)				
1950	Gerard Bijnens (CVP)	Alfred Bertrand (CVP)	Paul Meyers (CVP)	Paul Clerckx (CVP)	Walter-Joseph Thys (BSP)				
1954	Gerard Bijnens (CVP)	Alfred Bertrand (CVP)	Paul Meyers (CVP)	Eugène De Gent (Liberal)	Augustinus Husson (BSP)				
1958	Gerard Bijnens (CVP)	Alfred Bertrand (CVP)	Paul Meyers (CVP)	Eugène De Gent (Liberal)	Edgard Vanthilt (BSP)				
1961	Gerard Bijnens (CVP)	Alfred Bertrand (CVP)	Paul Meyers (CVP)	Tony Van Lindt (CVP)	Edgard Vanthilt (BSP)				
1965	Gerard Bijnens (CVP)	Alfred Bertrand (CVP)	Paul Meyers (CVP)	Tony Van Lindt (CVP)	Edgard Vanthilt (BSP)	Eugène De Gent (PVV)			
1968	Luc Dhoore (CVP)	Alfred Bertrand (CVP)	Paul Meyers (CVP)	Jozef Olaerts (VU)	Edgard Vanthilt (BSP)	Alfred Vreven (PVV)	Willy Claes (BSP)		
1971	Luc Dhoore (CVP)	Alfred Bertrand (CVP)	Georges Monard (CVP)	Jozef Olaerts (VU)	Emiel Vanijlen (BSP)	Alfred Vreven (PVV)	Willy Claes (BSP)		
1974	Luc Dhoore (CVP)	Alfred Bertrand (CVP)	Georges Monard (CVP)	Jozef Olaerts (VU)	Emiel Vanijlen (BSP)	Alfred Vreven (PVV)	Willy Claes (BSP)		
1977	Luc Dhoore (CVP)	Alfred Bertrand (CVP)	Georges Monard (CVP)	Willy Desaeyere (VU)	Eddy Baldewijns (BSP)	Alfred Vreven (PVV)	Willy Claes (BSP)		
1978	Luc Dhoore (CVP)	Firmin Aerts (CVP)	Georges Beerden (CVP)	Willy Desaeyere (VU)	Eddy Baldewijns (BSP)	Alfred Vreven (PVV)	Willy Claes (BSP)		
1981	Luc Dhoore (CVP)	Marilou Vanden Poel-Welkenhuysen (PVV)	Georges Beerden (CVP)	Willy Desaeyere (VU)	Eddy Baldewijns (BSP)	Alfred Vreven (PVV)	Willy Claes (BSP)		
1985	Luc Dhoore (CVP)	Edgard Vandebosch (CVP)	Georges Beerden (CVP)	Willy Desaeyere (VU)	Eddy Baldewijns (BSP)	Alfred Vreven (PVV)	Willy Claes (BSP)	Jan Verheyden (PS)	
1988	Luc Dhoore (CVP)	Edgard Vandebosch (CVP)	Georges Beerden (CVP)	Johan Sauwens (VU)	Eddy Baldewijns (BSP)	Alfred Vreven (PVV)	Willy Claes (BSP)	Jan Verheyden (PS)	
1991	Jo Vandeurzen (CVP)	Edgard Vandebosch (CVP)	Eddy Schuermans (CVP)	Johan Sauwens (VU)	Eddy Baldewijns (BSP)	Valère Vautmans (PVV)	Charles Moyaerts (PS)	Hugo Olaerts (VU)	Jean Caubergs (VB)
1995	Merged into Hasselt-Tongeren-Maaseik		Eddy Schuermans (CVP)						
