= Mons (Chamber of Representatives constituency) =

Belgian Chamber of Representatives constituency between 1831 and 1999

Mons was a constituency used to elect multiple members of the Belgian Chamber of Representatives between 1831 and 1991.

== Representatives ==
Election	Representative (Party)	Representative (Party)	Representative (Party)	Representative (Party)	Representative (Party)	Representative (Party)	Representative (Party)
1831	Alexandre Gendebien (Liberal)	Frédéric Corbisier (Liberal)	Philippe de Bousies (Liberal)				
1833	Alexandre Gendebien (Liberal)	Hubert Dolez (Liberal)	Remi De Puydt (Liberal)				
1837	Hippolyte Lange (Liberal)	Hubert Dolez (Liberal)	Joseph Sigart (Liberal)				
1841	Hippolyte Lange (Liberal)	Hubert Dolez (Liberal)	Joseph Sigart (Liberal)				
1845	Hippolyte Lange (Liberal)	Hubert Dolez (Liberal)	Joseph Sigart (Liberal)				
1848	Hippolyte Lange (Liberal)	Hubert Dolez (Liberal)	Charles de Royer de Dour (Liberal)				
1852	Hippolyte Lange (Liberal)	Hubert Dolez (Liberal)	Charles de Royer de Dour (Liberal)	Charles Rousselle (Catholic)	Emile Laubry (Liberal)		
1856	Hippolyte Lange (Liberal)	Hubert Dolez (Liberal)	Henri de Brouckère (Liberal)	Charles Rousselle (Catholic)	Emile Laubry (Liberal)		
1857	Hippolyte Lange (Liberal)	Hubert Dolez (Liberal)	Henri de Brouckère (Liberal)	Charles Carlier (Liberal)	Emile Laubry (Liberal)		
1861	Hippolyte Lange (Liberal)	Hubert Dolez (Liberal)	Henri de Brouckère (Liberal)	Charles Carlier (Liberal)	Emile Laubry (Liberal)		
1864	Hippolyte Lange (Liberal)	Hubert Dolez (Liberal)	Henri de Brouckère (Liberal)	Charles Carlier (Liberal)	Alfred Dethuin (Liberal)		
1868	Charles-Xavier Sainctelette (Liberal)	Hubert Dolez (Liberal)	Henri de Brouckère (Liberal)	Charles Carlier (Liberal)	Alfred Dethuin (Liberal)		
1870	Charles-Xavier Sainctelette (Liberal)	Arthur Lescarts (Liberal)	Léon Defuisseaux (Liberal)	Marius Boulenger (Liberal)	Alfred Dethuin (Liberal)		
1874	Charles-Xavier Sainctelette (Liberal)	Arthur Lescarts (Liberal)	Léon Defuisseaux (Liberal)	Henri Bockstael (Liberal)	Alfred Dethuin (Liberal)		
1878	Charles-Xavier Sainctelette (Liberal)	Arthur Lescarts (Liberal)	Emile Hardy (Liberal)	Henri Bockstael (Liberal)	Emile Masquelier (Liberal)		
1882	Charles-Xavier Sainctelette (Liberal)	Arthur Lescarts (Liberal)	Emile Hardy (Liberal)	Henri Bockstael (Liberal)	Emile Masquelier (Liberal)	Auguste Houzeau de Lehaie (Liberal)	
1886	Charles-Xavier Sainctelette (Liberal)	Arthur Lescarts (Liberal)	Emile Hardy (Liberal)	Edmond Steurs (Liberal)	Jules Carlier (Liberal)	Auguste Houzeau de Lehaie (Liberal)	
1890	Charles-Xavier Sainctelette (Liberal)	Arthur Lescarts (Liberal)	Emile Hardy (Liberal)	Edmond Steurs (Liberal)	Jules Carlier (Liberal)	Auguste Houzeau de Lehaie (Liberal)	
1892	Charles-Xavier Sainctelette (Liberal)	Arthur Lescarts (Liberal)	Edgard Pierman (Liberal)	Edmond Steurs (Liberal)	Jules Dufrane (Liberal)	Auguste Houzeau de Lehaie (Liberal)	
1894	Alfred Defuisseaux (PS)	Alphonse Brenez (PS)	Arthur Bastien (PS)	Aurèle Maroille (PS)	Jules Dufrane (Liberal)	Henri Roger (PS)	
1898	Alfred Defuisseaux (PS)	Alphonse Brenez (PS)	Arthur Bastien (PS)	Aurèle Maroille (PS)	Léon Defuisseaux (Liberal)	Henri Roger (PS)	
1900	Alphonse Harmignie (Catholic)	Alphonse Brenez (PS)	Louis Pépin (PS)	Aurèle Maroille (PS)	Léon Defuisseaux (Liberal)	Victor Delporte (Catholic)	
1904	Alphonse Harmignie (Catholic)	Alphonse Brenez (PS)	Louis Pépin (PS)	Aurèle Maroille (PS)	Fulgence Masson (Liberal)	Joseph Louis Descamps (Liberal)	
1908	Alphonse Harmignie (Catholic)	Alphonse Brenez (PS)	Louis Pépin (PS)	Aurèle Maroille (PS)	Fulgence Masson (Liberal)	Victor Delporte (Catholic)	
1912	Alphonse Harmignie (Catholic)	Alphonse Brenez (PS)	Louis Pépin (PS)	Camille Moury (PS)	Fulgence Masson (Liberal)	Edouard Servais (Catholic)	Philibert Verdure (PS)
1919	Alphonse Harmignie (Catholic)	Alphonse Brenez (PS)	Louis Pépin (PS)	Camille Moury (PS)	Fulgence Masson (Liberal)	Gustave Bastien (PS)	Louis Piérard (PS)
1921	Ignace Sinzot (Catholic)	Alphonse Brenez (PS)	Louis Pépin (PS)	Philibert Verdure (PS)	Fulgence Masson (Liberal)	Achille Delattre (PS)	Louis Piérard (PS)
1925	Ignace Sinzot (Catholic)	Alphonse Brenez (PS)	Louis Pépin (PS)	Philibert Verdure (PS)	Fulgence Masson (Liberal)	Achille Delattre (PS)	Louis Piérard (PS)
1929	Ignace Sinzot (Catholic)	Gustave Debersé (Catholic)	Louis Pépin (PS)	Philibert Verdure (PS)	Fulgence Masson (Liberal)	Achille Delattre (PS)	Louis Piérard (PS)
1932	Ignace Sinzot (Catholic)	Gustave Debersé (Catholic)	Alphonse Louis Goblet (PS)	Joseph Bouilly (Catholic)	Victor Maistriau (Liberal)	Leo Collard (PS)	Louis Piérard (PS)
1936	Juvénal Gandibleux (PCB)	Gustave Debersé (Catholic)	Alphonse Louis Goblet (PS)	Achille Delattre (BSP)	Victor Maistriau (Liberal)	Leo Collard (PS)	Louis Piérard (PS)
1939	Jules Levecq (PCB)	Gustave Debersé (Catholic)	Raoul Defuisseaux (PS)	Achille Delattre (BSP)	Victor Maistriau (Liberal)	Leo Collard (PS)	Louis Piérard (PS)
1946	Jean Terfve (PCB)	Hilaire Willot (CVP)	Raoul Defuisseaux (PS)	Achille Delattre (BSP)	Marcelin Demoulin (PCB)	Leo Collard (PS)	Louis Piérard (PS)
1949	Jean Terfve (PCB)	Hilaire Willot (CVP)	Pierre Couneson (CVP)	Achille Delattre (BSP)	René Leclercq (Liberal)	Leo Collard (PS)	Louis Piérard (PS)
1950	Jean Terfve (PCB)	Hilaire Willot (CVP)	Alfred Bonjean (BSP)	Achille Delattre (BSP)	René Leclercq (Liberal)	Leo Collard (PS)	Henri Deruelles (BSP)
1954	Jean Terfve (PCB)	Hilaire Willot (CVP)	Alfred Bonjean (BSP)	Arthur Nazé (BSP)	Roger Toubeau (BSP)	Leo Collard (PS)	Henri Deruelles (BSP)
1958	Octave Lebas (CVP)	Hilaire Willot (CVP)	Roger De Looze (Liberal)	Arthur Nazé (BSP)	Roger Toubeau (BSP)	Leo Collard (PS)	Henri Deruelles (BSP)
1961	Octave Lebas (CVP)	Hilaire Willot (CVP)	Albert L'Allemand (PSI)	Arthur Nazé (BSP)	Roger Toubeau (BSP)	Leo Collard (PS)	Marc Drumaux (PCB)
1965	Léon Hannotte (PVV)	Yves Urbain (CVP)	6 seats	Arthur Nazé (BSP)	Roger Toubeau (BSP)	Leo Collard (PS)	Marc Drumaux (PCB)
1968	Léon Hannotte (PVV)	Fernand Ducobu (CVP)	6 seats	Arthur Nazé (BSP)	Henri Deruelles (BSP)	Leo Collard (PS)	Marc Drumaux (PCB)
1971	Léon Hannotte (PVV)	Noëlla Dinant (PCB)	6 seats	Arthur Nazé (BSP)	Henri Deruelles (BSP)	Robert Urbain (PSB)	Victor Delporte (PSC)
1974	Léon Hannotte (PVV)	Noëlla Dinant (PCB)	6 seats	Adolphe Ducobu (cdH)	Henri Deruelles (BSP)	Robert Urbain (PSB)	Jean-Pierre Levecq (RW)
1977	Michel Tromont (PRL)	Noëlla Dinant (PCB)	6 seats	Adolphe Ducobu (cdH)	Robert Leclercq (PSB)	Robert Urbain (PSB)	Yvon Biefnot (PSB)
1978	Michel Tromont (PRL)	Albert Liénard (cdH)	6 seats	Noëlla Dinant (PCB)	Robert Leclercq (PSB)	Robert Urbain (PSB)	Yvon Biefnot (PSB)
1981	Jacqueline Ghevaert-Croquet (PRL)	Albert Liénard (cdH)	6 seats	Maurice Lafosse (PS)	Yvon Harmegnies (PS)	Robert Urbain (PSB)	Yvon Biefnot (PSB)
1985	André Lagneau (PRL)	Albert Liénard (cdH)	5 seats		Yvon Harmegnies (PS)	Robert Urbain (PSB)	Yvon Biefnot (PSB)
1988	Didier Donfut (PS)	Albert Liénard (cdH)	5 seats		Yvon Harmegnies (PS)	Robert Urbain (PSB)	Yvon Biefnot (PSB)
1991	Jean-Pierre Viseur (Ecolo)	Albert Liénard (cdH)	5 seats		Yvon Harmegnies (PS)	Robert Urbain (PSB)	Yvon Biefnot (PSB)
1995	Merged into Mons Soignes						
