= Soignies (Chamber of Representatives constituency) =

Belgian political subdivision

Soignies was a constituency that elected a single member to the Belgian Chamber of Representatives between 1831 and 1995.

== Representatives ==
Election	Representative (Party)	Representative (Party)	Representative (Party)	Representative (Party)
1831	Auguste Duvivier (Liberal)	Edouard Mary (Catholic)	2 seats	
1833	Auguste Duvivier (Liberal)	Bernard Amé du Bus de Gisignies (Catholic)	2 seats	
1837	Auguste Duvivier (Liberal)	Bernard Amé du Bus de Gisignies (Catholic)	2 seats	
1841	Auguste Duvivier (Liberal)	Bernard Amé du Bus de Gisignies (Catholic)	2 seats	
1845	Jean Bricourt (Liberal)	Louis Faignart (Catholic)	Jean De Saive (Liberal)	3 seats
1848	Henri Ansiau (Liberal)	Louis Faignart (Catholic)	Louis Debroux (Liberal)	3 seats
1852	Henri Ansiau (Liberal)	Louis Faignart (Catholic)	Louis Matthieu (Catholic)	3 seats
1856	Henri Ansiau (Liberal)	Louis Faignart (Catholic)	Louis Matthieu (Catholic)	3 seats
1857	Henri Ansiau (Liberal)	Louis Faignart (Catholic)	Joseph Jouret (Liberal)	3 seats
1861	Henri Ansiau (Liberal)	Louis Faignart (Catholic)	Joseph Jouret (Liberal)	3 seats
1864	Henri Ansiau (Liberal)	Adrien Bruneau (Liberal)	Joseph Jouret (Liberal)	3 seats
1868	Henri Ansiau (Liberal)	Adrien Bruneau (Liberal)	Joseph Jouret (Liberal)	3 seats
1870	Henri Ansiau (Liberal)	Ernest Boucquéau (Catholic)	Léon Houtart (Liberal)	3 seats
1874	Gustave Paternoster (Liberal)	Ernest Boucquéau (Catholic)	Léon Houtart (Liberal)	3 seats
1878	Gustave Paternoster (Liberal)	Grégoire Wincqz (Liberal)	Léon Houtart (Liberal)	3 seats
1882	Gustave Paternoster (Liberal)	Grégoire Wincqz (Liberal)	Léon Houtart (Liberal)	3 seats
1886	Gustave Paternoster (Liberal)	Jules Thiriar (Liberal)	Paul Scoumanne (Liberal)	3 seats
1890	Gustave Paternoster (Liberal)	Jules Thiriar (Liberal)	Paul Scoumanne (Liberal)	3 seats
1892	Gustave Paternoster (Liberal)	Jules Thiriar (Liberal)	Paul Scoumanne (Liberal)	3 seats
1894	Jules Mansart (PS)	Louis Bertrand (PS)	Oscar Paquay (PS)	3 seats
1898	Jules Mansart (PS)	Louis Bertrand (PS)	René Branquart (PS)	3 seats
1900	Jules Mansart (PS)	Gustave Paternoster (Liberal)	René Branquart (PS)	Léon Mabille (Catholic)
1904	Jules Mansart (PS)	Alphonse Gravis (Catholic)	Pol-Clovis Boël (Liberal)	Léon Mabille (Catholic)
1908	Jules Mansart (PS)	Alphonse Gravis (Catholic)	Pol-Clovis Boël (Liberal)	Léon Mabille (Catholic)
1912	Jules Mansart (PS)	René Branquart (PS)	Pol-Clovis Boël (Liberal)	Léon Mabille (Catholic)
1919	Jules Mansart (PS)	René Branquart (PS)	Pol-Clovis Boël (Liberal)	Léon Mabille (Catholic)
1921	Jules Mansart (PS)	René Branquart (PS)	Emile Schevenels (PS)	Pierre Delannoy (Catholic)
1925	Jules Mansart (PS)	René Branquart (PS)	Léon Lepoivre (Liberal)	Pierre Delannoy (Catholic)
1929	Jules Mansart (PS)	René Branquart (PS)	Emile Schevenels (PS)	Pierre Delannoy (Catholic)
1932	Gaston Hoyaux (PS)	Georges Willocq (Catholic)	Emile Schevenels (PS)	Pierre Vouloir (Catholic)
1936	Gaston Hoyaux (PS)	Joseph Martel (PS)	Emile Schevenels (PS)	Pierre Vouloir (Catholic)
1939	Gaston Hoyaux (PS)	Ernest Duray (Liberal)	Emile Schevenels (PS)	Joseph Oblin (Catholic)
1946	Gaston Hoyaux (PS)	Willy Frère (PCB)	Emile Schevenels (PS)	Joseph Oblin (Catholic)
1949	Gaston Hoyaux (PS)	Emile Duret (BSP)	Joseph Martel (BSP)	Joseph Oblin (Catholic)
1950	Gaston Hoyaux (PS)	Emile Duret (BSP)	Joseph Martel (BSP)	Joseph Oblin (Catholic)
1954	Gaston Hoyaux (PS)	Gaston Longeval (Liberal)	Joseph Martel (BSP)	René Pêtre (CVP)
1958	Gaston Hoyaux (PS)	Marcel Collart (BSP)	Joseph Martel (BSP)	René Pêtre (CVP)
1961	Léon Hurez (BSP)	Marcel Collart (BSP)	Roger Gailliez (BSP)	René Pêtre (CVP)
1965	Léon Hurez (BSP)	Marcel Collart (BSP)	Claude Lerouge (PVV)	René Pêtre (CVP)
1968	Léon Hurez (BSP)	Marcel Couteau (PCB)	Claude Lerouge (PVV)	René Pêtre (CVP)
1971	Léon Hurez (BSP)	Marcel Couteau (PCB)	Richard Gondry (PSB)	René Pêtre (CVP)
1974	Léon Hurez (BSP)	René Jérôme (cdH)	Richard Gondry (PSB)	Robert Lacroix (PSB)
1977	Léon Hurez (BSP)	René Jérôme (cdH)	Richard Gondry (PSB)	Guy Pierard (PRL)
1978	Léon Hurez (BSP)	René Jérôme (cdH)	Richard Gondry (PSB)	Guy Pierard (PRL)
1981	Jean Delhaye (PS)	René Jérôme (cdH)	Richard Gondry (PSB)	Guy Pierard (PRL)
1985	Colette Burgeon (PS)	René Jérôme (cdH)	Richard Gondry (PSB)	José Brisart (Ecolo)
1988	Colette Burgeon (PS)	René Jérôme (cdH)	Jean-Paul Vancrombruggen (PS)	André Dubois (PRL)
1991	Colette Burgeon (PS)	Guy Hollogne (cdH)	Guy Pierard (PRL)	José Brisart (Ecolo)
1995	Merged into Bergen Soignes			
