= Mechelen (Chamber of Representatives constituency) =

Belgian political subdivision

Mechelen was a constituency used to elect members of the Belgian Chamber of Representatives between 1831 and 1995, when it was merged into the constituency of Mechelen-Turnhout.

== Representatives ==
Election	Representative (Party)	Representative (Party)	Representative (Party)	Representative (Party)	Representative (Party)	Representative (Party)
1831	François Domis (Catholic)	François Polfvliet (Liberal)	Philippe-Joseph Boucquéau de Villeraie (Catholic)	3 seats		
1833	Adolphe Van den Wiele (Catholic)	François Polfvliet (Liberal)	Charles Mast-De Vries (Catholic)	3 seats		
1837	Jean de Perceval (Liberal)	François Polfvliet (Liberal)	Charles Mast-De Vries (Catholic)	3 seats		
1841	Jean Scheyven (Catholic)	Jean-François Henot (Catholic)	Charles Mast-De Vries (Catholic)	3 seats		
1845	Jean Scheyven (Catholic)	Jean-François Henot (Catholic)	Charles Mast-De Vries (Catholic)	3 seats		
1848	Armand de Perceval (Liberal)	Félix van den Branden de Reeth (Catholic)	Florentin de Brouwer de Hogendorp (Liberal)	3 seats		
1852	Armand de Perceval (Liberal)	Félix van den Branden de Reeth (Catholic)	Florentin de Brouwer de Hogendorp (Liberal)	3 seats		
1856	Armand de Perceval (Liberal)	Félix van den Branden de Reeth (Catholic)	Florentin de Brouwer de Hogendorp (Liberal)	3 seats		
1857	Jean Notelteirs (Catholic)	Félix van den Branden de Reeth (Catholic)	Ludovic-Marie d'Ursel (Catholic)	3 seats		
1861	Jean Notelteirs (Catholic)	Félix van den Branden de Reeth (Catholic)	Ludovic-Marie d'Ursel (Catholic)	3 seats		
1864	Jean Notelteirs (Catholic)	Eugène de Kerckhove (Catholic)	Ludovic-Marie d'Ursel (Catholic)	3 seats		
1868	Jean Notelteirs (Catholic)	Eugène de Kerckhove (Catholic)	Louis Lefebvre (Catholic)	3 seats		
1870	Jean Notelteirs (Catholic)	Eugène de Kerckhove (Catholic)	Louis Lefebvre (Catholic)	3 seats		
1874	Jean Notelteirs (Catholic)	Eugène de Kerckhove (Catholic)	Louis Lefebvre (Catholic)	3 seats		
1878	Jean Notelteirs (Catholic)	Eugène de Kerckhove (Catholic)	Louis Lefebvre (Catholic)	3 seats		
1882	Jean Notelteirs (Catholic)	Victor Emile Fris (Catholic)	Louis Lefebvre (Catholic)	3 seats		
1886	Jean Notelteirs (Catholic)	Victor Emile Fris (Catholic)	Albert Alexandre Lefebvre (Catholic)	3 seats		
1890	Jean Notelteirs (Catholic)	Victor Emile Fris (Catholic)	Albert Alexandre Lefebvre (Catholic)	3 seats		
1892	Jean Notelteirs (Catholic)	Victor Emile Fris (Catholic)	Albert Alexandre Lefebvre (Catholic)	François Broers (Catholic)	4 seats	
1894	Edouard De Cocq (Catholic)	Victor Emile Fris (Catholic)	Albert Alexandre Lefebvre (Catholic)	Florent Van Cauwenbergh (Catholic)	4 seats	
1898	Edouard De Cocq (Catholic)	Victor Emile Fris (Catholic)	Albert Alexandre Lefebvre (Catholic)	Florent Van Cauwenbergh (Catholic)	4 seats	
1900	Edouard De Cocq (Catholic)	Victor Van de Walle (Liberal)	Albert Alexandre Lefebvre (Catholic)	Florent Van Cauwenbergh (Catholic)	4 seats	
1904	Edouard De Cocq (Catholic)	Victor Van de Walle (Liberal)	Albert Alexandre Lefebvre (Catholic)	Florent Van Cauwenbergh (Catholic)	4 seats	
1908	Charles Lefebvre (Catholic)	Victor Van de Walle (Liberal)	Jules Ortegat (Catholic)	Florent Van Cauwenbergh (Catholic)	4 seats	
1912	Charles Lefebvre (Catholic)	Victor Van de Walle (Liberal)	Jules Ortegat (Catholic)	Florent Van Cauwenbergh (Catholic)	Paul Lamborelle (Liberal)	5 seats
1919	Auguste Van Landeghem (PS)	Désiré Bouchery (PS)	Jules De Keersmaecker (Catholic)	Florent Van Cauwenbergh (Catholic)	Philip Van Isacker (Catholic)	5 seats
1921	Auguste Van Landeghem (PS)	Désiré Bouchery (PS)	Jules De Keersmaecker (Catholic)	Paul Lamborelle (Liberal)	Philip Van Isacker (Catholic)	5 seats
1925	Jaak Wellens (PS)	Désiré Bouchery (PS)	Jules De Keersmaecker (Catholic)	Willem Lambrechts (PS)	Philip Van Isacker (Catholic)	5 seats
1929	Jan Laenen (Catholic)	Désiré Bouchery (PS)	Jules De Keersmaecker (Catholic)	Ward Hermans (Frontpartij)	Philip Van Isacker (Catholic)	5 seats
1932	Edgar Maes (Catholic)	Désiré Bouchery (PS)	Gaston Fromont (PS)	Oscar Vankesbeeck (Liberal)	Philip Van Isacker (Catholic)	5 seats
1936	Edgar Maes (Catholic)	Désiré Bouchery (PS)	Gaston Fromont (PS)	Emiel Van Hamme (Catholic)	Jan Laenen (Catholic)	Jean Schaepherders (Catholic)
1939	Edgar Maes (Catholic)	Antoon Spinoy (PS)	Gaston Fromont (PS)	Alfons Verbist (Catholic)	Paul Lamborelle (Liberal)	Ward Hermans (VNV)
1946	Edgar Maes (Catholic)	Antoon Spinoy (PS)	Gaston Fromont (PS)	Alfons Verbist (Catholic)	Urbain Muyldermans (Liberal)	Emiel Van Hamme (CVP)
1949	Edgar Maes (Catholic)	Antoon Spinoy (PS)	Jan Van Winghe (BSP)	Alfons Verbist (Catholic)	Urbain Muyldermans (Liberal)	Emiel Van Hamme (CVP)
1950	Jozef Smedts (CVP)	Antoon Spinoy (PS)	Jan Van Winghe (BSP)	Alfons Verbist (Catholic)	Jos De Saeger (CVP)	Emiel Van Hamme (CVP)
1954	Jozef Magé (BSP)	Antoon Spinoy (PS)	Jan Van Winghe (BSP)	Alfons Verbist (Catholic)	Jos De Saeger (CVP)	Emiel Van Hamme (CVP)
1958	Jozef Smedts (CVP)	Antoon Spinoy (PS)	Jan Van Winghe (BSP)	Alfons Verbist (Catholic)	Jos De Saeger (CVP)	Emiel Van Hamme (CVP)
1961	Jozef Smedts (CVP)	Antoon Spinoy (PS)	Jan Van Winghe (BSP)	Herman Vanderpoorten (Liberal)	Jos De Saeger (CVP)	Emiel Van Hamme (CVP)
1965	Michel Van Dessel (CVP)	Désiré Van Daele (BSP)	Jan Van Winghe (BSP)	Frans De Weert (PVV)	Jos De Saeger (CVP)	Emiel Van Hamme (CVP)
1968	Michel Van Dessel (CVP)	Désiré Van Daele (BSP)	Hugo Adriaensens (BSP)	Charles De Vlieger (PVV)	Jos De Saeger (CVP)	Ludo Sels (VU)
1971	Michel Van Dessel (CVP)	Désiré Van Daele (BSP)	Hugo Adriaensens (BSP)	Guido Verhaegen (CVP)	Jos De Saeger (CVP)	Ludo Sels (VU)
1974	Michel Van Dessel (CVP)	Désiré Van Daele (BSP)	Hugo Adriaensens (BSP)	Guido Verhaegen (CVP)	Joos Somers (VU)	Ludo Sels (VU)
1977	Michel Van Dessel (CVP)	Jef Ramaekers (BSP)	Luc Van den Brande (CVP)	Guido Verhaegen (CVP)	Joos Somers (VU)	Ludo Sels (VU)
1978	Michel Van Dessel (CVP)	Jef Ramaekers (BSP)	Luc Van den Brande (CVP)	Guido Verhaegen (CVP)	Joos Somers (VU)	Lucien Van de Velde (PVV)
1981	Fernand Geyselings (Agalev)	Jef Ramaekers (BSP)	Luc Van den Brande (CVP)	Guido Verhaegen (CVP)	Joos Somers (VU)	Lucien Van de Velde (PVV)
1985	Joan Pepermans (Agalev)	Jef Ramaekers (BSP)	Luc Van den Brande (CVP)	Guido Verhaegen (CVP)	Paul Hermans (CVP)	Lucien Van de Velde (PVV)
1988	Freddy Sarens (CVP)	Jean Van der Sande (PS)	Luc Van den Brande (CVP)	Herman Candries (VU)	Paul Hermans (CVP)	Maurice Vanhoutte (PVV)
1991	Freddy Sarens (CVP)	Jean Van der Sande (PS)	Jozef Van Eetvelt (CVP)	Herman Candries (VU)	Luk Van Nieuwenhuysen (VB)	Maurice Vanhoutte (PVV)
1995	Merged into Mechelen-Turnhout					
