= Dendermonde (Chamber of Representatives constituency) =

Belgian political subdivision

Dendermonde was a constituency used to elect a single member of the Belgian Chamber of Representatives between 1831 and 1991.

== Representatives ==
Election	Representative (Party)	Representative (Party)	Representative (Party)	Representative (Party)
1831	François van den Broucke de Terbecq (Catholic)	Hippolyte Vilain XIIII (Liberal)	2 seats	
1833	François van den Broucke de Terbecq (Catholic)	Hippolyte Vilain XIIII (Liberal)	2 seats	
1837	François van den Broucke de Terbecq (Catholic)	Pierre de Decker (Catholic)	2 seats	
1841	François van den Broucke de Terbecq (Catholic)	Pierre de Decker (Catholic)	2 seats	
1845	François van den Broucke de Terbecq (Catholic)	Pierre de Decker (Catholic)	Prosper de Kerchove de Denterghem (Catholic)	3 seats
1848	Charles Vermeire (Catholic)	Pierre de Decker (Catholic)	Prosper de Kerchove de Denterghem (Catholic)	3 seats
1852	Charles Vermeire (Catholic)	Pierre de Decker (Catholic)	Constantin Van Cromphaut (Catholic)	3 seats
1856	Charles Vermeire (Catholic)	Pierre de Decker (Catholic)	Constantin Van Cromphaut (Catholic)	3 seats
1857	Charles Vermeire (Catholic)	Pierre de Decker (Catholic)	Constantin Van Cromphaut (Catholic)	3 seats
1861	Charles Vermeire (Catholic)	Pierre de Decker (Catholic)	Constantin Van Cromphaut (Catholic)	3 seats
1864	Charles Vermeire (Catholic)	François van den Broucke de Terbecq (Catholic)	Constantin Van Cromphaut (Catholic)	3 seats
1868	Charles Vermeire (Catholic)	François van den Broucke de Terbecq (Catholic)	Constantin Van Cromphaut (Catholic)	3 seats
1870	Charles Vermeire (Catholic)	François van den Broucke de Terbecq (Catholic)	Gustave Vanden Steen (Catholic)	3 seats
1874	Philippe De Kepper (Catholic)	François van den Broucke de Terbecq (Catholic)	Gustave Vanden Steen (Catholic)	3 seats
1878	Philippe De Kepper (Catholic)	Léon De Bruyn (Catholic)	Gustave Vanden Steen (Catholic)	3 seats
1882	Philippe De Kepper (Catholic)	Léon De Bruyn (Catholic)	Gustave Vanden Steen (Catholic)	3 seats
1886	Philippe De Kepper (Catholic)	Léon De Bruyn (Catholic)	Gustave Vanden Steen (Catholic)	3 seats
1890	Philippe De Kepper (Catholic)	Léon De Bruyn (Catholic)	Gustave Vanden Steen (Catholic)	3 seats
1892	Philippe De Kepper (Catholic)	Léon De Bruyn (Catholic)	Gustave Vanden Steen (Catholic)	3 seats
1894	Emile Tibbaut (Catholic)	Léon De Bruyn (Catholic)	Gustave Vanden Steen (Catholic)	3 seats
1898	Emile Tibbaut (Catholic)	Léon De Bruyn (Catholic)	Abel de Kerchove d'Exaerde (Catholic)	3 seats
1900	Emile Tibbaut (Catholic)	Léon De Bruyn (Catholic)	Abel de Kerchove d'Exaerde (Catholic)	3 seats
1904	Emile Tibbaut (Catholic)	Cesar Van Damme (Liberal)	Abel de Kerchove d'Exaerde (Catholic)	3 seats
1908	Emile Tibbaut (Catholic)	Cesar Van Damme (Liberal)	Leon Bruynincx (Catholic)	3 seats
1912	Emile Tibbaut (Catholic)	Cesar Van Damme (Liberal)	Leon Bruynincx (Catholic)	Oscar Vermeersch (Catholic)
1919	Emile Tibbaut (Catholic)	Hippolyte Vandemeulebroucke (PS)	Leon Bruynincx (Catholic)	Jules De Brouwer (PS)
1921	Emile Tibbaut (Catholic)	Hippolyte Vandemeulebroucke (PS)	Edmond Rubbens (Catholic)	Jules De Brouwer (PS)
1925	Emile Tibbaut (Catholic)	Hippolyte Vandemeulebroucke (PS)	Edmond Rubbens (Catholic)	Henri Libbrecht (Catholic)
1929	Emile Tibbaut (Catholic)	Hippolyte Vandemeulebroucke (PS)	Edmond Rubbens (Catholic)	Jules De Brouwer (PS)
1932	Joseph du Château (Catholic)	Hippolyte Vandemeulebroucke (PS)	Edmond Rubbens (Catholic)	Jules De Brouwer (PS)
1936	Joseph du Château (Catholic)	Auguste Van de Velde (Catholic)	Josephus Steps (Catholic)	Julius De Pauw (BSP)
1939	Joseph du Château (Catholic)	Auguste Van de Velde (Catholic)	Josephus Steps (Catholic)	Julius De Pauw (BSP)
1946	Benoit Van Acker (CVP)	William Bruynincx (CVP)	Josephus Steps (Catholic)	Julius De Pauw (BSP)
1949	Benoit Van Acker (CVP)	Laurent De Wilde (Liberal)	Josephus Steps (Catholic)	Julius De Pauw (BSP)
1950	Benoit Van Acker (CVP)	William Bruynincx (CVP)	Josephus Steps (Catholic)	Julius De Pauw (BSP)
1954	Benoit Van Acker (CVP)	William Bruynincx (CVP)	Marcel Daman (BSP)	Julius De Pauw (BSP)
1958	Benoit Van Acker (CVP)	Etienne Cooreman (CVP)	Gustave Boeykens (BSP)	Julius De Pauw (BSP)
1961	Benoit Van Acker (CVP)	Etienne Cooreman (CVP)	Gustave Boeykens (BSP)	Julius De Pauw (BSP)
1965	Marcel Duerinck (CVP)	Etienne Cooreman (CVP)	Gustave Boeykens (BSP)	Eugène Van Cauteren (PVV)
1968	Marcel Duerinck (CVP)	Virgile Decommer (VU)	Gustave Boeykens (BSP)	Eugène Van Cauteren (PVV)
1971	Marcel Duerinck (CVP)	Avil Geerinck (VU)	Gustave Boeykens (BSP)	Frans Verberckmoes (PVV)
1974	Jan Lenssens (CVP)	René Uyttendaele (CVP)	Gustave Boeykens (BSP)	Frans Verberckmoes (PVV)
1977	Jan Lenssens (CVP)	René Uyttendaele (CVP)	Gustave Boeykens (BSP)	Frans Verberckmoes (PVV)
1978	Jan Lenssens (CVP)	René Uyttendaele (CVP)	Gustave Boeykens (BSP)	Frans Verberckmoes (PVV)
1981	Jan Lenssens (CVP)	René Uyttendaele (CVP)	Norbert De Batselier (PS)	Frans Verberckmoes (PVV)
1985	Jan Lenssens (CVP)	René Uyttendaele (CVP)	Norbert De Batselier (PS)	Frans Verberckmoes (PVV)
1988	Jan Lenssens (CVP)	René Uyttendaele (CVP)	Norbert De Batselier (PS)	Frans Verberckmoes (PVV)
1991	Johan De Mol (PS)	John Taylor (CVP)	Norbert De Batselier (PS)	Marc Verwilghen (PVV)
1995	Merged into Dendermonde-Sint-Niklaas			
