= Bruges (Chamber of Representatives constituency) =

Belgian political subdivision

Bruges was a constituency used to elect multiple members of the Belgian Chamber of Representatives between 1831 and 2003.

== Representatives ==
Election	Representative (Party)	Representative (Party)	Representative (Party)	Representative (Party)	Representative (Party)
1831	Charles Coppieters Stochove (Catholic)	Isidore Jullien (Liberal)	Paul Devaux (Liberal)	3 seats	
1833	Charles Coppieters Stochove (Catholic)	Isidore Jullien (Liberal)	Paul Devaux (Liberal)	3 seats	
1837	Charles Coppieters Stochove (Catholic)	Louis Maertens (Liberal)	Paul Devaux (Liberal)	3 seats	
1841	Charles Coppieters Stochove (Catholic)	Louis Maertens (Liberal)	Paul Devaux (Liberal)	3 seats	
1845	Charles Coppieters Stochove (Catholic)	Louis Maertens (Liberal)	Paul Devaux (Liberal)	3 seats	
1848	Antoine Sinave (Liberal)	Ernest Peers (Liberal)	Paul Devaux (Liberal)	3 seats	
1852	Antoine Sinave (Liberal)	Jean-Baptiste Coppieters 't Wallant (Liberal)	Paul Devaux (Liberal)	3 seats	
1856	Antoine Sinave (Liberal)	Jean-Baptiste Coppieters 't Wallant (Liberal)	Paul Devaux (Liberal)	3 seats	
1857	Adolphe de Vrière (Liberal)	Louis De Ridder (Liberal)	Paul Devaux (Liberal)	3 seats	
1861	Amedée Visart de Bocarmé (Catholic)	Emile De Clercq (Catholic)	Gustave Soenens (Catholic)	3 seats	
1864	Auguste Valckenaere (Liberal)	Emile De Clercq (Catholic)	Louis Van Nieuwenhuyse (Liberal)	3 seats	
1868	Amedée Visart de Bocarmé (Catholic)	Emile De Clercq (Catholic)	Adolphe de Vrière (Liberal)	3 seats	
1870	Amedée Visart de Bocarmé (Catholic)	Emile De Clercq (Catholic)	Charles-Julien van Outryve d'Ydewalle (Catholic)	3 seats	
1874	Amedée Visart de Bocarmé (Catholic)	Emile De Clercq (Catholic)	Eugène-Edouard van Outryve d'Ydewalle (Catholic)	3 seats	
1878	Amedée Visart de Bocarmé (Catholic)	Arthur Pecsteen (Liberal)	Eugène-Edouard van Outryve d'Ydewalle (Catholic)	3 seats	
1882	Amedée Visart de Bocarmé (Catholic)	Alfred Ronse (Catholic)	Emile De Clercq (Catholic)	3 seats	
1886	Amedée Visart de Bocarmé (Catholic)	Alfred Ronse (Catholic)	Adolphe Declercq (Catholic)	3 seats	
1890	Amedée Visart de Bocarmé (Catholic)	Alfred Ronse (Catholic)	Adolphe Declercq (Catholic)	3 seats	
1892	Amedée Visart de Bocarmé (Catholic)	Alfred Ronse (Catholic)	Adolphe Declercq (Catholic)	3 seats	
1894	Amedée Visart de Bocarmé (Catholic)	Alfred Ronse (Catholic)	Adolphe Declercq (Catholic)	3 seats	
1898	Amedée Visart de Bocarmé (Catholic)	Alfred Ronse (Catholic)	Adolphe Declercq (Catholic)	3 seats	
1900	Amedée Visart de Bocarmé (Catholic)	Albéric Ruzette (Catholic)	François De Brabandere (Catholic)	Léon Termote (Liberal)	4 seats
1904	Amedée Visart de Bocarmé (Catholic)	Eugène Standaert (Catholic)	Maurice de Maere d'Aertrycke (Catholic)	Albert Thooris (Liberal)	4 seats
1908	Amedée Visart de Bocarmé (Catholic)	Eugène Standaert (Catholic)	Joseph Strubbe (Catholic)	Albert Thooris (Liberal)	4 seats
1912	Amedée Visart de Bocarmé (Catholic)	Eugène Standaert (Catholic)	Gustave D'Hondt (Catholic)	Florimond Fonteyne (Daensist)	4 seats
1919	Amedée Visart de Bocarmé (Catholic)	Eugène Standaert (Catholic)	Camiel Mostaert (PS)	Henri De Clerck (PS)	4 seats
1921	René Debruyne (Catholic)	Eugène Standaert (Catholic)	Camiel Mostaert (PS)	Jules Boedt (Liberal)	4 seats
1925	René Debruyne (Catholic)	Eugène Standaert (Catholic)	Achiel Van Acker (PS)	Jules Boedt (Liberal)	4 seats
1929	René Debruyne (Catholic)	André van Outryve d'Ydewalle (Catholic)	Victor De Lille (Catholic)	Jules Boedt (Liberal)	4 seats
1932	René Debruyne (Catholic)	Achiel Van Acker (PS)	Maurice Geûens (Catholic)	Jules Boedt (Liberal)	4 seats
1936	René Debruyne (Catholic)	Jozef Devroe (VNV)	Maurice Geûens (Catholic)	Frans Desmidt (Liberal)	4 seats
1939	Etienne Floré (Catholic)	Jozef Devroe (VNV)	Maurice Geûens (Catholic)	Achiel Van Acker (PS)	4 seats
1946	Achiel Van Acker (BSP)	Gerard Eneman (CVP)	Leopold Deschepper (CVP)	Julius Wostyn (BSP)	4 seats
1949	Achiel Van Acker (BSP)	Gerard Eneman (CVP)	Leopold Deschepper (CVP)	Alfons De Nolf (CVP)	Victor Sabbe (Liberal)
1950	Achiel Van Acker (BSP)	Gerard Eneman (CVP)	Leopold Deschepper (CVP)	Alfons De Nolf (CVP)	Julius Wostyn (BSP)
1954	Achiel Van Acker (BSP)	Gerard Eneman (CVP)	Leopold Deschepper (CVP)	Alfons De Nolf (CVP)	Julius Wostyn (BSP)
1958	Achiel Van Acker (BSP)	Gerard Eneman (CVP)	Maurice Devriendt (CVP)	Alfons De Nolf (CVP)	Julius Wostyn (BSP)
1961	Achiel Van Acker (BSP)	Gerard Eneman (CVP)	Fernand Vandamme (CVP)	Alfons De Nolf (CVP)	Frank Van Acker (BSP)
1965	Achiel Van Acker (BSP)	Gerard Eneman (CVP)	Albert Claes (PVV)	Alfons De Nolf (CVP)	Pieter Leys (VU)
1968	Achiel Van Acker (BSP)	Gerard Eneman (CVP)	Albert Claes (PVV)	Fernand Vandamme (CVP)	Pieter Leys (VU)
1971	Achiel Van Acker (BSP)	Daniel Coens (CVP)	Albert Claes (PVV)	Omaar Carpels (BSP)	Pieter Leys (VU)
1974	Achiel Van Acker (BSP)	Daniel Coens (CVP)	Albert Claes (PVV)	Willem Content (BSP)	Fernand Vandamme (CVP)
1977	Achiel Van Acker (BSP)	Daniel Coens (CVP)	Albert Claes (PVV)	Willem Content (BSP)	Emmanuel Desutter (CVP)
1978	Achiel Van Acker (BSP)	Daniel Coens (CVP)	Albert Claes (PVV)	Raf Declercq (VU)	Emmanuel Desutter (CVP)
1981	Achiel Van Acker (BSP)	Daniel Coens (CVP)	Jan Leclercq (PS)	Raf Declercq (VU)	Emmanuel Desutter (CVP)
1985	Jacques Devolder (PVV)	Daniel Coens (CVP)	Jan Leclercq (PS)	Pierre Chevalier (PS)	Emmanuel Desutter (CVP)
1987	Jacques Devolder (PVV)	Daniel Coens (CVP)	Mimi Kestelijn-Sierens (CVP)	Pierre Chevalier (PS)	Emmanuel Desutter (CVP)
1991	Jacques Devolder (PVV)	Edward Demuyt (CVP)	Luc Goutry (CVP)	Pierre Chevalier (PS)	Renaat Landuyt (PS)
1995	Frans Lozie (Agalev)	4 seats	Luc Goutry (CVP)	Pierre Chevalier (PS)	Renaat Landuyt (PS)
1999	Dalila Douifi (PS)	4 seats	Luc Goutry (CVP)	Pierre Chevalier (PS)	Henk Verlinde (PS)
