= Ypres (Chamber of Representatives constituency) =

Belgian political subdivision

Ypres was a constituency used to elect members of the Belgian Chamber of Representatives between 1831 and 1991.

== Representatives ==
Election	Representative (Party)	Representative (Party)	Representative (Party)
1831	Louis de Robiano (Catholic)	Louis Vuylsteke (Catholic)	2 seats
1833	Ferdinand Vuylsteke (Catholic)	Louis Vuylsteke (Catholic)	2 seats
1837	Auguste de Florisone (Catholic)	François de Langhe (Liberal)	2 seats
1841	Jules Malou (Catholic)	Pierre Biebuyck (Liberal)	2 seats
1845	Jules Malou (Catholic)	Pierre Biebuyck (Liberal)	Charles-Louis Van Renynghe (Catholic)
1848	Jules Malou (Catholic)	Alphonse Vandenpeereboom (Liberal)	Charles-Louis Van Renynghe (Catholic)
1852	Jules Malou (Catholic)	Alphonse Vandenpeereboom (Liberal)	Charles-Louis Van Renynghe (Catholic)
1856	Jules Malou (Catholic)	Alphonse Vandenpeereboom (Liberal)	Charles-Louis Van Renynghe (Catholic)
1857	Léon de Florisone (Liberal)	Alphonse Vandenpeereboom (Liberal)	Charles-Louis Van Renynghe (Catholic)
1861	Léon de Florisone (Liberal)	Alphonse Vandenpeereboom (Liberal)	Charles-Louis Van Renynghe (Catholic)
1864	Léon de Florisone (Liberal)	Alphonse Vandenpeereboom (Liberal)	Charles-Louis Van Renynghe (Catholic)
1868	Jules Van Merris (Liberal)	Alphonse Vandenpeereboom (Liberal)	Pierre Beke (Liberal)
1870	Félix Berten (Catholic)	Alphonse Vandenpeereboom (Liberal)	Pierre Biebuyck (Catholic)
1874	Félix Berten (Catholic)	Eugène Struye (Catholic)	Pierre Biebuyck (Catholic)
1878	Félix Berten (Catholic)	Eugène Struye (Catholic)	Pierre Biebuyck (Catholic)
1882	Félix Berten (Catholic)	Eugène Struye (Catholic)	René Colaert (Catholic)
1886	Félix Berten (Catholic)	Eugène Struye (Catholic)	René Colaert (Catholic)
1890	Félix Berten (Catholic)	Eugène Struye (Catholic)	René Colaert (Catholic)
1892	Félix Berten (Catholic)	Eugène Struye (Catholic)	René Colaert (Catholic)
1894	Félix Van Merris (Catholic)	Henri Iweins d'Eeckhoutte (Catholic)	René Colaert (Catholic)
1898	Félix Van Merris (Catholic)	Henri Iweins d'Eeckhoutte (Catholic)	René Colaert (Catholic)
1900	Félix Van Merris (Catholic)	Ernest Nolf (Liberal)	René Colaert (Catholic)
1904	Félix Van Merris (Catholic)	Ernest Nolf (Liberal)	René Colaert (Catholic)
1908	Félix Van Merris (Catholic)	Ernest Nolf (Liberal)	René Colaert (Catholic)
1912	Félix Van Merris (Catholic)	Ernest Nolf (Liberal)	René Colaert (Catholic)
1919	Jules Vandromme (Catholic)	Max Glorie (Liberal)	René Colaert (Catholic)
1921	Edgard Missiaen (PS)	Emile Butaye (Frontpartij)	René Colaert (Catholic)
1925	Edgard Missiaen (PS)	Emile Butaye (Frontpartij)	Henri Brutsaert (Catholic)
1929	Edgard Missiaen (PS)	Marcel Vandenbulcke (Frontpartij)	Henri Brutsaert (Catholic)
1932	Edgard Missiaen (PS)	Emile Butaye (Frontpartij)	Robert De Man (Catholic)
1936	Edgard Missiaen (PS)	Emile Butaye (Frontpartij)	Robert De Man (Catholic)
1939	Edgard Missiaen (PS)	Jean Vanderghote (Catholic)	Robert De Man (Catholic)
1946	Fernand Lefère (CVP)	Hilaire Lahaye (Liberal)	Jeroom Stubbe (CVP)
1949	Fernand Lefère (CVP)	Hilaire Lahaye (Liberal)	Edgard Missiaen (BSP)
1950	Fernand Lefère (CVP)	Hilaire Lahaye (Liberal)	Jeroom Stubbe (CVP)
1954	Fernand Lefère (CVP)	Hilaire Lahaye (Liberal)	Marcel Bode (CVP)
1958	Fernand Lefère (CVP)	Hilaire Lahaye (Liberal)	Marcel Bode (CVP)
1961	Fernand Lefère (CVP)	Gustave Breyne (BSP)	Marcel Bode (CVP)
1965	Fernand Lefère (CVP)	Gustave Breyne (BSP)	Marcel Bode (CVP)
1968	Arlette Duclos-Lahaye (PVV)	2 seats	Marcel Bode (CVP)
1971	Arlette Duclos-Lahaye (PVV)	2 seats	Marcel Bode (CVP)
1974	Gustave Breyne (BSP)	2 seats	Marcel Bode (CVP)
1977	Cecile Boeraeve-Derycke (CVP)	2 seats	Marcel Bode (CVP)
1978	Arlette Duclos-Lahaye (PVV)	2 seats	Paul Breyne (CVP)
1981	Cecile Boeraeve-Derycke (CVP)	2 seats	Paul Breyne (CVP)
1985	Cecile Boeraeve-Derycke (CVP)	2 seats	Paul Breyne (CVP)
1988	Marc Mahieu (PVV)	2 seats	Paul Breyne (CVP)
1991	Maurice Bourgois (PS)	2 seats	Paul Breyne (CVP)
1995	Merged into Veurne-Diksmuide-Ostend-Ypres		
