= Sint-Niklaas (Chamber of Representatives constituency) =

Former Belgian national constituency

Sint-Niklaas was a constituency used to elect members of the Belgian Chamber of Representatives between 1831 and 1995.

== Representatives ==
Election	Representative (Party)	Representative (Party)	Representative (Party)	Representative (Party)
1831	Charles Vilain XIIII (Catholic)	Constantin Rodenbach (Catholic)	Marin Verhagen (Catholic)	3 seats
1833	Albert van Hoobrouck de Fiennes (Catholic)	Constantin Rodenbach (Catholic)	Bernard Stas de Richelle (Catholic)	3 seats
1837	Albert van Hoobrouck de Fiennes (Catholic)	Charles Vilain XIIII (Catholic)	Pierre-Joseph Cools (Liberal)	3 seats
1841	Charles de Meester (Catholic)	Charles Vilain XIIII (Catholic)	Pierre-Antoine Verwilghen (Catholic)	3 seats
1845	Charles de Meester (Catholic)	Charles Vilain XIIII (Catholic)	Theodoor de T'Serclaes de Wommersom (Catholic)	3 seats
1848	Charles de Meester (Catholic)	Pierre Joseph Cools (Liberal)	Theodoor de T'Serclaes de Wommersom (Catholic)	3 seats
1852	Isidore Van Overloop (Catholic)	Theodoor Janssens (Catholic)	Theodoor de T'Serclaes de Wommersom (Catholic)	3 seats
1856	Isidore Van Overloop (Catholic)	Theodoor Janssens (Catholic)	Theodoor de T'Serclaes de Wommersom (Catholic)	3 seats
1857	Isidore Van Overloop (Catholic)	Theodoor Janssens (Catholic)	Stanislas Verwilghen (Catholic)	3 seats
1861	Isidore Van Overloop (Catholic)	Theodoor Janssens (Catholic)	Stanislas Verwilghen (Catholic)	3 seats
1864	Isidore Van Overloop (Catholic)	Theodoor Janssens (Catholic)	Stanislas Verwilghen (Catholic)	3 seats
1868	Isidore Van Overloop (Catholic)	Theodoor Janssens (Catholic)	Stanislas Verwilghen (Catholic)	3 seats
1870	Isidore Van Overloop (Catholic)	Theodoor Janssens (Catholic)	Stanislas Verwilghen (Catholic)	3 seats
1874	Jules Malou (Catholic)	Theodoor Janssens (Catholic)	Stanislas Verwilghen (Catholic)	3 seats
1878	Jules Malou (Catholic)	Theodoor Janssens (Catholic)	Stanislas Verwilghen (Catholic)	3 seats
1882	Joseph Nicolas Van Naemen (Catholic)	Theodoor Janssens (Catholic)	Stanislas Verwilghen (Catholic)	3 seats
1886	Joseph Nicolas Van Naemen (Catholic)	Auguste Raemdonck van Megrode (Catholic)	Stanislas Verwilghen (Catholic)	3 seats
1890	Joseph Nicolas Van Naemen (Catholic)	Auguste Raemdonck van Megrode (Catholic)	Stanislas Verwilghen (Catholic)	3 seats
1892	Joseph Nicolas Van Naemen (Catholic)	Auguste Raemdonck van Megrode (Catholic)	Stanislas Verwilghen (Catholic)	Alfons Janssens (Catholic)
1894	Joseph Nicolas Van Naemen (Catholic)	Auguste Raemdonck van Megrode (Catholic)	Stanislas Verwilghen (Catholic)	Alfons Janssens (Catholic)
1898	Joseph Nicolas Van Naemen (Catholic)	Auguste Raemdonck van Megrode (Catholic)	Frans Van Brussel (Catholic)	Alfons Janssens (Catholic)
1900	Joseph Nicolas Van Naemen (Catholic)	Auguste Raemdonck van Megrode (Catholic)	Frans Van Brussel (Catholic)	Alexandre de Browne de Tiège (Catholic)
1904	Joseph Nicolas Van Naemen (Catholic)	Auguste Raemdonck van Megrode (Catholic)	Frans Van Brussel (Catholic)	Jean Persoons (Liberal)
1908	Louis de Brouchoven de Bergeyck (Catholic)	Auguste Raemdonck van Megrode (Catholic)	Frans Van Brussel (Catholic)	Jean Persoons (Liberal)
1912	Jean-Baptiste Nobels (Catholic)	Auguste Raemdonck van Megrode (Catholic)	Frans Van Brussel (Catholic)	Jean Persoons (Liberal)
1919	Hendrik Heyman (Catholic)	Auguste Raemdonck van Megrode (Catholic)	Frans Van Brussel (Catholic)	Karel Van Hoeylandt (PS)
1921	Hendrik Heyman (Catholic)	Auguste Raemdonck van Megrode (Catholic)	Alphonse Devos (PS)	Karel Van Hoeylandt (PS)
1925	Hendrik Heyman (Catholic)	Auguste Raemdonck van Megrode (Catholic)	Louis Herbert (Catholic)	Karel Van Hoeylandt (PS)
1929	Hendrik Heyman (Catholic)	Auguste Raemdonck van Megrode (Catholic)	Florent Beeckx (Catholic)	Karel Van Hoeylandt (PS)
1932	Hendrik Heyman (Catholic)	Auguste Raemdonck van Megrode (Catholic)	Florent Beeckx (Catholic)	Karel Van Hoeylandt (PS)
1936	Hendrik Heyman (Catholic)	Auguste Raemdonck van Megrode (Catholic)	Joannes Seghers (VNV)	Karel Van Hoeylandt (PS)
1939	Hendrik Heyman (Catholic)	Jozef Van Royen (Catholic)	Joannes Seghers (VNV)	Karel Van Hoeylandt (PS)
1946	Hendrik Heyman (Catholic)	Jozef Van Royen (Catholic)	Frans Van Goey (CVP)	Jozef Vercauteren (BSP)
1949	Hendrik Heyman (Catholic)	Jozef Van Royen (Catholic)	Frans Van Goey (CVP)	Jozef Vercauteren (BSP)
1950	Hendrik Heyman (Catholic)	Jozef Van Royen (Catholic)	Frans Van Goey (CVP)	Jozef Vercauteren (BSP)
1954	Albert Vermaere (CVP)	Jozef Van Royen (Catholic)	Frans Van Goey (CVP)	Jozef Vercauteren (BSP)
1958	Albert Vermaere (CVP)	Jozef Van Royen (Catholic)	Omer De Mey (CVP)	Jozef Vercauteren (BSP)
1961	Emile Goeman (CVP)	Remi Bogaert (CVP)	Omer De Mey (CVP)	Jozef Vercauteren (BSP)
1965	Emile Goeman (CVP)	Maurits Coppieters (VU)	Omer De Mey (CVP)	Jozef Vercauteren (BSP)
1968	Emile Goeman (CVP)	Maurits Coppieters (VU)	Omer De Mey (CVP)	Aimé Van Lent (BSP)
1971	Paul De Vidts (CVP)	Nelly Maes (VU)	Omer De Mey (CVP)	Aimé Van Lent (BSP)
1974	Paul De Vidts (CVP)	Nelly Maes (VU)	Omer De Mey (CVP)	Aimé Van Lent (BSP)
1977	Lieven Lenaerts (CVP)	Nelly Maes (VU)	Omer De Mey (CVP)	Aimé Van Lent (BSP)
1978	Lieven Lenaerts (CVP)	Miet Smet (CVP)	Omer De Mey (CVP)	Freddy Willockx (BSP)
1981	Georges Anthuenis (PVV)	Miet Smet (CVP)	Jan Verniers (VU)	Freddy Willockx (BSP)
1985	Lieven Lenaerts (CVP)	Miet Smet (CVP)	Nelly Maes (VU)	Freddy Willockx (BSP)
1988	Magda De Meyer (PS)	Miet Smet (CVP)	Nelly Maes (VU)	Freddy Willockx (BSP)
1991	Magda De Meyer (PS)	Miet Smet (CVP)	Frans Wymeersch (VB)	Marc Cordeel (PVV)
1995	Merged into Dendermonde-Sint-Niklaas			
