= Ghent (Chamber of Representatives constituency) =

Belgian political subdivision

Ghent was a constituency used to elect members of the Belgian Chamber of Representatives between 1831 and 1900.

== Representatives ==
Election	Representative (Party)	Representative (Party)	Representative (Party)	Representative (Party)	Representative (Party)	Representative (Party)	Representative (Party)	Representative (Party)	Representative (Party)
1831	Charles Coppens (Liberal)	Ferdinand Speelman-Rooman (Catholic)	François Hye-Hoys (Catholic)	Franz Vergauwen (Catholic)	Léandre Desmaisières (Catholic)	Robert Helias d'Huddeghem (Catholic)	6 seats		
1833	Ferdinand Manilius (Liberal)	Henri Kervyn (Catholic)	François Hye-Hoys (Catholic)	Franz Vergauwen (Catholic)	Léandre Desmaisières (Catholic)	Joseph-Olivier Andries (Catholic)	6 seats		
1837	Ferdinand Manilius (Liberal)	Henri Kervyn (Catholic)	François Hye-Hoys (Catholic)	Josse Delehaye (Liberal)	Léandre Desmaisières (Catholic)	Joseph de Potter-Soenens (Catholic)	6 seats		
1841	Ferdinand Manilius (Liberal)	Henri Kervyn (Catholic)	François d'Elhoungne (Liberal)	Josse Delehaye (Liberal)	Léandre Desmaisières (Catholic)	Pierre De Saegher (Catholic)	6 seats		
1845	Ferdinand Manilius (Liberal)	Eugène Van Huffel (Liberal)	François d'Elhoungne (Liberal)	Josse Delehaye (Liberal)	Gustave Herry (Liberal)	Charles d'Hane de Steenhuyse (Catholic)	6 seats		
1848	Ferdinand Manilius (Liberal)	Edmond Van Grootven (Liberal)	François d'Elhoungne (Liberal)	Josse Delehaye (Liberal)	Henri Reyntjens (Liberal)	Hippolyte Rolin (Liberal)	6 seats		
1852	Ferdinand Manilius (Liberal)	Edmond Van Grootven (Liberal)	Emile Van Hoorebeke (Liberal)	Josse Delehaye (Liberal)	Pierre van Remoortere de Naeyer (Liberal)	Henri t'Kint de Roodenbeke (Catholic)	Léopold Maertens (Catholic)	7 seats	
1856	Eugène De Smet (Catholic)	Henri de Kerchove (Catholic)	Joseph Van Goethem (Catholic)	Josse Delehaye (Liberal)	Pierre Van Tieghem de ten Berghe (Catholic)	Henri t'Kint de Roodenbeke (Catholic)	Léopold Maertens (Catholic)	7 seats	
1857	Adolphe-Henri Neyt (Liberal)	August de Maere (Liberal)	Camille Joseph De Bast (Liberal)	Charles Saeyman (Liberal)	Edouard Jaequemyns (Liberal)	Ernest Vandenpeereboom (Liberal)	Jules Vander Stichelen (Liberal)	7 seats	
1861	Eugène Coppens (Catholic)	Hippolyte Van de Woestyne (Catholic)	Philippe Kervyn de Volkaersbeke (Catholic)	Pierre de Baets (Catholic)	Edouard Jaequemyns (Liberal)	Ernest Vandenpeereboom (Liberal)	Jules Vander Stichelen (Liberal)	7 seats	
1864	Auguste Lippens (Liberal)	Charles de Kerchove de Denterghem (Liberal)	Philippe Kervyn de Volkaersbeke (Catholic)	Pierre de Baets (Catholic)	Edouard Jaequemyns (Liberal)	Ernest Vandenpeereboom (Liberal)	Jules Vander Stichelen (Liberal)	7 seats	
1868	Auguste Lippens (Liberal)	Charles de Kerchove de Denterghem (Liberal)	Philippe Kervyn de Volkaersbeke (Catholic)	François d'Elhoungne (Liberal)	Edouard Jaequemyns (Liberal)	Ernest Vandenpeereboom (Liberal)	Jules Vander Stichelen (Liberal)	7 seats	
1870	Auguste Lippens (Liberal)	Charles de Kerchove de Denterghem (Liberal)	Alexandre Cruyt (Catholic)	Léon de Moerman d'Harlebeke (Catholic)	Louis Drubbel (Catholic)	Séraphin De Smet (Catholic)	Josse Delehaye (Catholic)	7 seats	
1874	Philippe Kervyn de Volkaersbeke (Catholic)	Charles de Kerchove de Denterghem (Liberal)	Alexandre Cruyt (Catholic)	Léon de Moerman d'Harlebeke (Catholic)	Louis Drubbel (Catholic)	Séraphin De Smet (Catholic)	Josse Delehaye (Catholic)	7 seats	
1878	Auguste Wagener (Liberal)	Constant Verhaeghe de Naeyer (Liberal)	Edmond Willequet (Liberal)	Gustave Rolin Jaequemyns (Liberal)	Jules de Hemptinne (Liberal)	Jules Devigne (Liberal)	François d'Elhoungne (Liberal)	Auguste Lippens (Liberal)	8 seats
1882	Auguste Wagener (Liberal)	Hippolyte Callier (Liberal)	Edmond Willequet (Liberal)	Gustave Rolin Jaequemyns (Liberal)	Jules de Hemptinne (Liberal)	Jules Devigne (Liberal)	François d'Elhoungne (Liberal)	Hippolyte Lippens (Liberal)	8 seats
1886	Achille Albert Eeman (Catholic)	Astère Vercruysse de Solart (Catholic)	Désiré Fiévé (Catholic)	Justin Van Cleemputte (Catholic)	Louis de Hemptinne (Catholic)	Paul de Smet de Naeyer (Catholic)	Victor Begerem (Catholic)	Hippolyte Lippens (Liberal)	8 seats
1890	Achille Albert Eeman (Catholic)	Astère Vercruysse de Solart (Catholic)	Désiré Fiévé (Catholic)	Justin Van Cleemputte (Catholic)	Louis de Hemptinne (Catholic)	Paul de Smet de Naeyer (Catholic)	Victor Begerem (Catholic)	Georges Herry (Catholic)	8 seats
1892	Achille Albert Eeman (Catholic)	Arthur Ligy (Catholic)	Désiré Fiévé (Catholic)	Justin Van Cleemputte (Catholic)	Louis de Hemptinne (Catholic)	Paul de Smet de Naeyer (Catholic)	Victor Begerem (Catholic)	Georges Herry (Catholic)	Louis De Reu (Catholic)
1894	Achille Albert Eeman (Catholic)	Arthur Ligy (Catholic)	Auguste Huyshauwer (Catholic)	Justin Van Cleemputte (Catholic)	Louis de Hemptinne (Catholic)	Paul de Smet de Naeyer (Catholic)	Victor Begerem (Catholic)	Eugène De Guchtenaere (Catholic)	Jules Maenhaut van Lemberge (Catholic)
1898	Gérard Cooreman (Catholic)	Arthur Ligy (Catholic)	Auguste Huyshauwer (Catholic)	Justin Van Cleemputte (Catholic)	Louis de Hemptinne (Catholic)	Paul de Smet de Naeyer (Catholic)	Victor Begerem (Catholic)	Eugène De Guchtenaere (Catholic)	Jules Maenhaut van Lemberge (Catholic)
