= Waremme (Chamber of Representatives constituency) =

Waremme was a constituency used to elect members of the Belgian Chamber of Representatives between 1831 and 1900.

== Representatives ==
Election	Representative (Party)	Representative (Party)
1831	Joseph-Stanislas Fleussu (Liberal)	1 seat
1833	Pierre Eloy de Burdinne (Catholic)	1 seat
1837	Pierre Eloy de Burdinne (Catholic)	1 seat
1841	Pierre Eloy de Burdinne (Catholic)	1 seat
1845	Pierre Eloy de Burdinne (Catholic)	1 seat
1848	Ferdinand Desoer (Catholic)	1 seat
1852	Guillaume Lejeune (Liberal)	1 seat
1856	Emile De Lexhy (Liberal)	1 seat
1857	Emile De Lexhy (Liberal)	1 seat
1861	Emile De Lexhy (Liberal)	1 seat
1864	Emile De Lexhy (Liberal)	1 seat
1868	Emile De Lexhy (Liberal)	1 seat
1870	Emile De Lexhy (Liberal)	1 seat
1874	Emile De Lexhy (Liberal)	1 seat
1878	Pierre Hallet (Liberal)	Pierre Jules Lejeune (Liberal)
1882	Pierre Hallet (Liberal)	Pierre Jules Lejeune (Liberal)
1886	Dieudonné Alfred Ancion (Catholic)	Hyacinthe Eugène Cartuyvels (Catholic)
1890	Dieudonné Alfred Ancion (Catholic)	Hyacinthe Eugène Cartuyvels (Catholic)
1892	Dieudonné Alfred Ancion (Catholic)	Hyacinthe Eugène Cartuyvels (Catholic)
1894	Dieudonné Alfred Ancion (Catholic)	Dominique Pitsaer (Catholic)
1898	Dieudonné Alfred Ancion (Catholic)	Dominique Pitsaer (Catholic)
