= Huy (Chamber of Representatives constituency) =

Belgian political subdivision

Huy was a constituency used to elect a single member of the Belgian Chamber of Representatives between 1831 and 1900.

== Representatives ==
| Election | Representative (Party) | Representative (Party) |
|---|---|---|
| 1831 | François Dautrebande (Liberal) | Joseph Lebeau (Liberal) |
| 1833 | Lambert Heptia (Liberal) | Pierre-Joseph David (Catholic) |
| 1837 | Louis van den Steen de Jehay (Catholic) | Pierre-Joseph David (Catholic) |
| 1841 | Louis van den Steen de Jehay (Catholic) | Henri Thyrion (Liberal) |
| 1845 | Louis van den Steen de Jehay (Catholic) | François Dautrebande (Liberal) |
| 1848 | Joseph Lebeau (Liberal) | François Dautrebande (Liberal) |
| 1852 | Joseph Lebeau (Liberal) | François Dautrebande (Liberal) |
| 1856 | Joseph Lebeau (Liberal) | François Dautrebande (Liberal) |
| 1857 | Joseph Lebeau (Liberal) | François Dautrebande (Liberal) |
| 1861 | Joseph Lebeau (Liberal) | Ferdinand de Macar (Liberal) |
| 1864 | Edouard Preud'homme (Liberal) | Ferdinand de Macar (Liberal) |
| 1868 | Edouard Preud'homme (Liberal) | Ferdinand de Macar (Liberal) |
| 1870 | Gustave de Lhoneux (Catholic) | Ferdinand de Macar (Liberal) |
| 1874 | Gustave de Lhoneux (Catholic) | Ferdinand de Macar (Liberal) |
| 1878 | Joseph Warnant (Liberal) | Ferdinand de Macar (Liberal) |
| 1882 | Joseph Warnant (Liberal) | Ferdinand de Macar (Liberal) |
| 1886 | Joseph Warnant (Liberal) | Ferdinand de Macar (Liberal) |
| 1890 | Joseph Warnant (Liberal) | Ferdinand de Macar (Liberal) |
| 1892 | Joseph Warnant (Liberal) | Félix Rigaux (Catholic) |
| 1894 | Joseph Warnant (Liberal) | Emile Mouton (Liberal) |
| 1898 | Georges Hubin (PS) | Emile Mouton (Liberal) |
