= Eeklo (Chamber of Representatives constituency) =

Belgian political subdivision

Eeklo was a constituency used to elect a single member of the Belgian Chamber of Representatives between 1831 and 1900.

== Representatives ==
Election	Representative (Party)
1831	Albert van Hoobrouck de Fiennes (Catholic)
1833	Désiré Le Jeune (Catholic)
1837	Désiré Le Jeune (Catholic)
1841	Désiré Le Jeune (Catholic)
1845	Désiré Le Jeune (Catholic)
1848	Emile Van Hoorebeke (Liberal)
1852	Léandre Desmaisières (Catholic)
1856	Léandre Desmaisières (Catholic)
1857	Léandre Desmaisières (Catholic)
1861	Joseph Kervyn de Lettenhove (Catholic)
1864	Joseph Kervyn de Lettenhove (Catholic)
1868	Joseph Kervyn de Lettenhove (Catholic)
1870	Joseph Kervyn de Lettenhove (Catholic)
1874	Joseph Kervyn de Lettenhove (Catholic)
1878	Joseph Kervyn de Lettenhove (Catholic)
1882	Joseph Kervyn de Lettenhove (Catholic)
1886	Joseph Kervyn de Lettenhove (Catholic)
1890	Arnold t'Kint de Roodenbeke (Catholic)
1892	Arnold t'Kint de Roodenbeke (Catholic)
1894	Arnold t'Kint de Roodenbeke (Catholic)
1898	Arnold t'Kint de Roodenbeke (Catholic)
