= Maastricht (Chamber of Representatives constituency) =

Belgian political subdivision

Maastricht was a constituency used to elect members of the Belgian Chamber of Representatives between 1831 and 1839.

== Representatives ==
Election	Representative (Party)	Representative (Party)	Representative (Party)
1831	Joseph Laurent Jaminé (Liberal)	Maximilien de Renesse (Liberal)	Rutger de Tiecken de Terhove (Liberal)
1833	François Cornéli (Liberal)	Maximilien de Renesse (Liberal)	Henri Simons (Catholic)
