= Roermond (Chamber of Representatives constituency) =

Belgian political subdivision

Roermond was a constituency used to elect members of the Belgian Chamber of Representatives between the first Belgian parliamentary election in 1831, and the transfer of Roermond to the Kingdom of the Netherlands in 1839, under the stipulations of the Treaty of London.

== Representatives ==
| Election | Representative (Party) | Representative (Party) | Representative (Party) |
|---|---|---|---|
| 1831 | Théodore Olislagers de Sipernau (Catholic) | Antoine Ernst (Liberal) | Henri de Brouckère (Liberal) |
| 1833 | Nicolas de Longrée (Catholic) | Louis Beerenbroeck (Catholic) | Jean Scheyven (Catholic) |
| 1837 | Nicolas de Longrée (Catholic) | Louis Beerenbroeck (Catholic) | 2 seats |
