= 1831 Belgian general election =

29 August 1831	1833 →

All 102 seats in the Chamber of Representatives and all 51 seats in the Senate
Government before election
de Mûelenaere
Catholic-Liberal
Government after election
de Mûelenaere
Catholic-Liberal

General elections were held in Belgium on 29 August 1831. They were the first elections to the new bicameral parliament created by the constitution adopted in February 1831.

In the Senate elections Catholics won 31 seats and Liberals four. Voter turnout was 62.2%, although only 46,000 people (1.1% of the country's population) were eligible to vote.

On 8 September 1831, King Leopold I of Belgium opened the 1831–1832 parliamentary session, the first ever of the Belgian Parliament.

== Electoral system ==
The electoral system was defined in the 1831 constitution and the electoral law of 3 March 1831. The 102 members of the Chamber of Representatives and 51 members of the Senate were elected by absolute majority in 44 electoral districts. Each district had between one and seven representatives and one to three senators; some were elected by joint or alternating districts.

Eligibility vote was restricted to men aged 25 or older who held Belgian nationality either through birth or through grand naturalisation, and who paid a cens fixed by the electoral law. The cens differentiated depending on the place of residence.

=== Constituencies ===
The 44 constituencies elected 102 representatives and appointed 51 senators as follows.

Province	Constituency	Representatives	Senators
Antwerp (9 representatives; 4 senators)	Antwerp	4	2
Antwerp (9 representatives; 4 senators)	Mechelen	3	1
Antwerp (9 representatives; 4 senators)	Turnhout	2	1
Brabant (14 representatives; 7 senators)	Brussels	7	3.5 (Note: Brussels and Nivelles elected one Senator on an alternating basis, starting with Brussels)
Brabant (14 representatives; 7 senators)	Nivelles	3	1.5
Brabant (14 representatives; 7 senators)	Leuven	4	2
West Flanders (15 representatives; 8 senators)	Bruges	3	1
West Flanders (15 representatives; 8 senators)	Ypres	2	1.5 (Note: Veurne, Ostend and Diksmuide together elected one Senator, and a second on an alternating basis with Ypres)
West Flanders (15 representatives; 8 senators)	Kortrijk	3	2
West Flanders (15 representatives; 8 senators)	Tielt	2	1
West Flanders (15 representatives; 8 senators)	Roeselare	2	1
West Flanders (15 representatives; 8 senators)	Veurne	1	1.5
West Flanders (15 representatives; 8 senators)	Ostend	1	1.5
West Flanders (15 representatives; 8 senators)	Diksmuide	1	1.5
East Flanders (18 representatives; 9 senators)	Ghent	6	3
East Flanders (18 representatives; 9 senators)	Aalst	3	2
East Flanders (18 representatives; 9 senators)	Sint-Niklaas	3	1
East Flanders (18 representatives; 9 senators)	Oudenaarde	3	1
East Flanders (18 representatives; 9 senators)	Dendermonde	2	1
East Flanders (18 representatives; 9 senators)	Eeklo	1	1
Hainaut (15 representatives; 7 senators)	Mons	3	1.5 (Note: Mons and Tournai appointed one additional senator on an alternating basis)
Hainaut (15 representatives; 7 senators)	Tournai	4	1.5
Hainaut (15 representatives; 7 senators)	Charleroi	2.5 (Note: Charleroi and Thuin elected one representative on an alternating basis, beginning with Thuin)	1
Hainaut (15 representatives; 7 senators)	Thuin	1.5	1
Hainaut (15 representatives; 7 senators)	Soignies	2	1
Hainaut (15 representatives; 7 senators)	Ath	2	1
Liège (9 representatives; 5 senators)	Liège	4.5 (Note: Liège and Huy elected one representative on an alternating basis, beginning with Huy.)	2
Liège (9 representatives; 5 senators)	Huy	1.5	1
Liège (9 representatives; 5 senators)	Verviers	2	1
Liège (9 representatives; 5 senators)	Waremme	1	1
Limburg (9 representatives; 4 senators)	Maastricht	3.5 (Note: Maastricht and Hasselt elected one representative on an alternating basis, beginning with Hasselt.)	2
Limburg (9 representatives; 4 senators)	Hasselt	2.5	1
Limburg (9 representatives; 4 senators)	Roermond	3	1
Luxembourg (Note: This is the area of Luxembourg Province until 1839, when the stipulations of the Treaty of London ceded the area covered by the constituencies of Diekirch, Grevenmacher and Luxembourg back to the Grand Duchy of Luxembourg.) (8 representatives; 4 senators)	Bastogne	1	1.5 (Note: Bastogne and Marche alternated with Neufchâteau and Virton to appoint one Senator between them, with the first nomination being from Neufchâteau. These two pairs of constituencies further alternated with Diekirch/Grevenmacher/Arlon to appoint a second senator)
Luxembourg (8 representatives; 4 senators)	Marche	1	1.5
Luxembourg (8 representatives; 4 senators)	Neufchâteau	1	1.5
Luxembourg (8 representatives; 4 senators)	Virton	1	1.5
Luxembourg (8 representatives; 4 senators)	Diekirch	1	1.5 (Note: Diekirch, Grevenmacher and Arlon together appointed one Senator between them, and a second in turn with the paired constituencies Bastogne/Marche and Neufchâteau/Virton.)
Luxembourg (8 representatives; 4 senators)	Grevenmacher	1	1.5
Luxembourg (8 representatives; 4 senators)	Arlon	1	1.5
Luxembourg (8 representatives; 4 senators)	Luxembourg	1	1
Namur (5 representatives; 3 senators)	Namur	3	1.5 (Note: Philippeville and Namur appointed one further Senator on an alternating basis, beginning with Philippeville.)
Namur (5 representatives; 3 senators)	Philippeville	1	0.5
Namur (5 representatives; 3 senators)	Dinant	1	1

== Results ==
=== Senate ===
Party	Seats
Catholics	31
Liberals	4
Independents	16
Total	51
Source: Sternberger et al.
