= Louis E. Boone =

American academic author

Louis E. Boone (May 5, 1941 – January 7, 2005) was an American academic author. His works covered contemporary business and economics, and included university-level texts Contemporary Marketing and Contemporary Business (both with David L. Kurtz). His last residence was in Mobile, Alabama where he was the emeritus professor of business at the University of South Alabama.
