= Louis Waltniel =

Belgian liberal politician and industrialist

- Born: Louis Gustaaf Waltniel; 28 August 1925; Ninove, Belgium
- Died: 29 December 2001 (aged 76); Meerbeke, Belgium
- Occupations: politician, industrialist

Louis Gustaaf Waltniel (28 August 1925 – 29 December 2001) was a Belgian liberal politician and industrialist. He held a master's degree in economic sciences.

He was member of the city council, an alderman and finally mayor burgomaster of Ninove (1995–2001). Waltniel also served as a member of parliament (Chamber of Representatives: 1965–1968, 1971–1974, Belgian Senate 1974-1992), state secretary for the civil service (1981–1985), state secretary for finance (1985), Deputy-president of the Flemish government and Flemish minister of finance and the budget (1985–1988) and Flemish minister of housing, spatial planning and monuments (1988–1992). He was president of the Liberaal Vlaams Verbond from 1974 until 1982. In 1995 he was evicted from the Flemish Liberals and Democrats (VLD) because during the 1994 communal elections he headed a renegade liberal party list (BANIER) against the official local liberal party and then joined a coalition government with socialists and Christian-democrats in which he served as burgomaster.

== Sources ==
- Louis Waltniel (Liberal archive]
- M. Lion, Achteraf beschouwd. De Ninoofse politieke memoires van L. G. Waltniel, Meerbeke, ABC-druk, s.d., 184 p.
- P. Van Molle, Het Belgisch parlement 1894-1969, Gent, Erasmus, 1969, p. 379.
