= 1978 Belgian general election =

- 17 December 1978

212 seats in the Chamber of Representatives
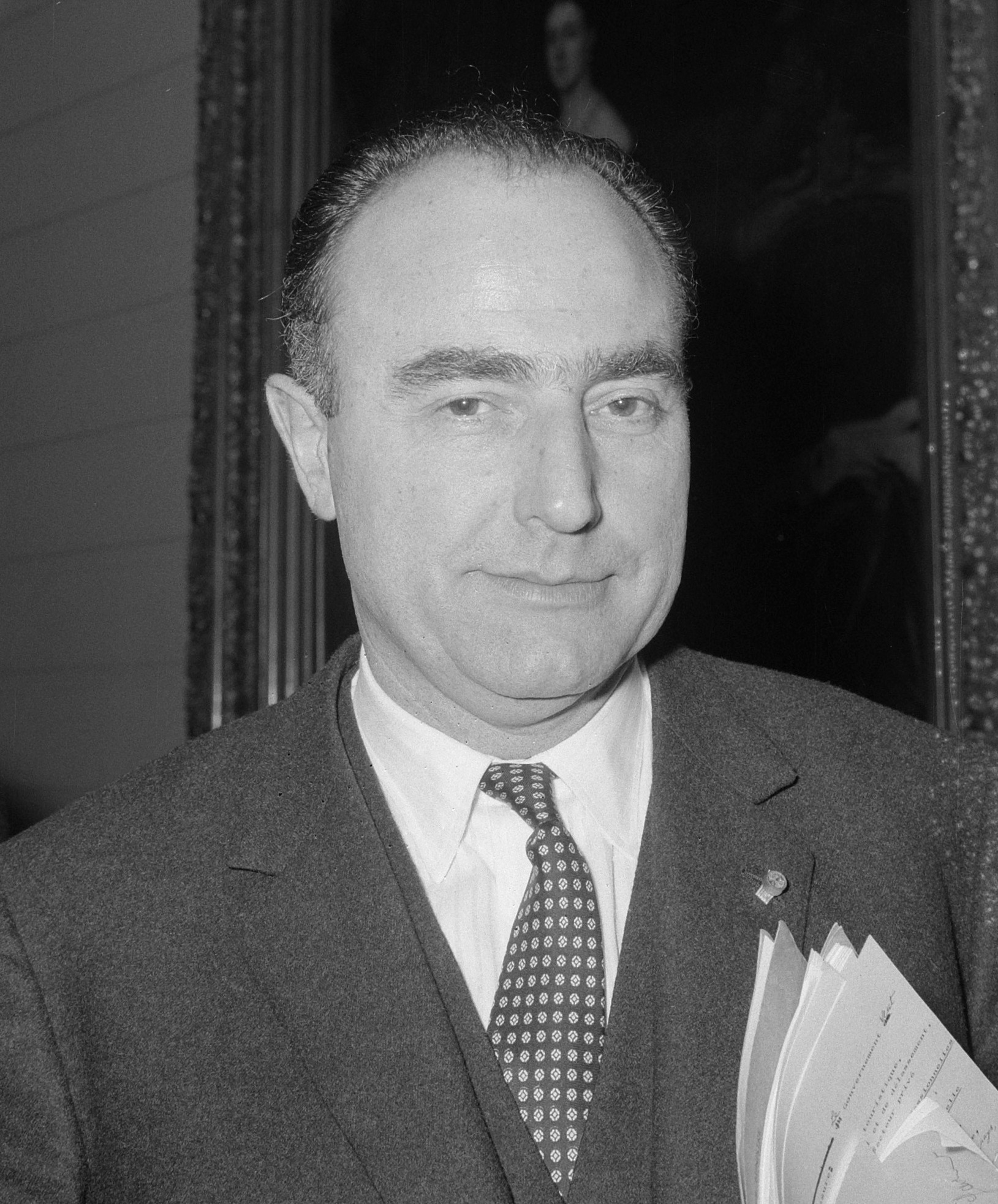

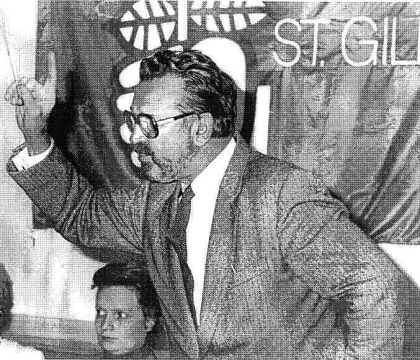

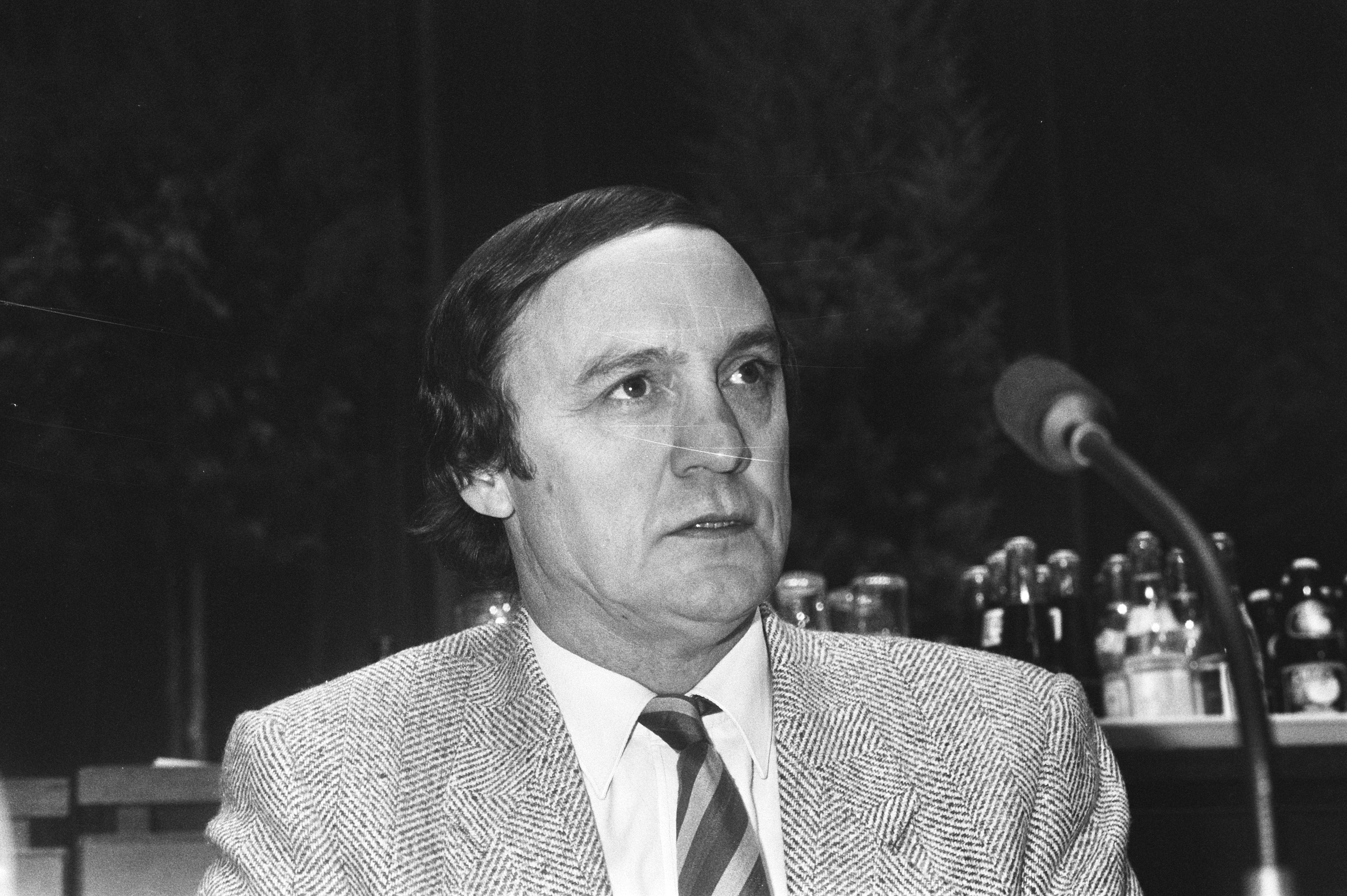

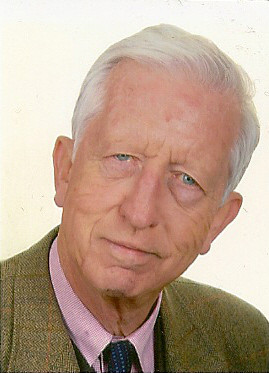

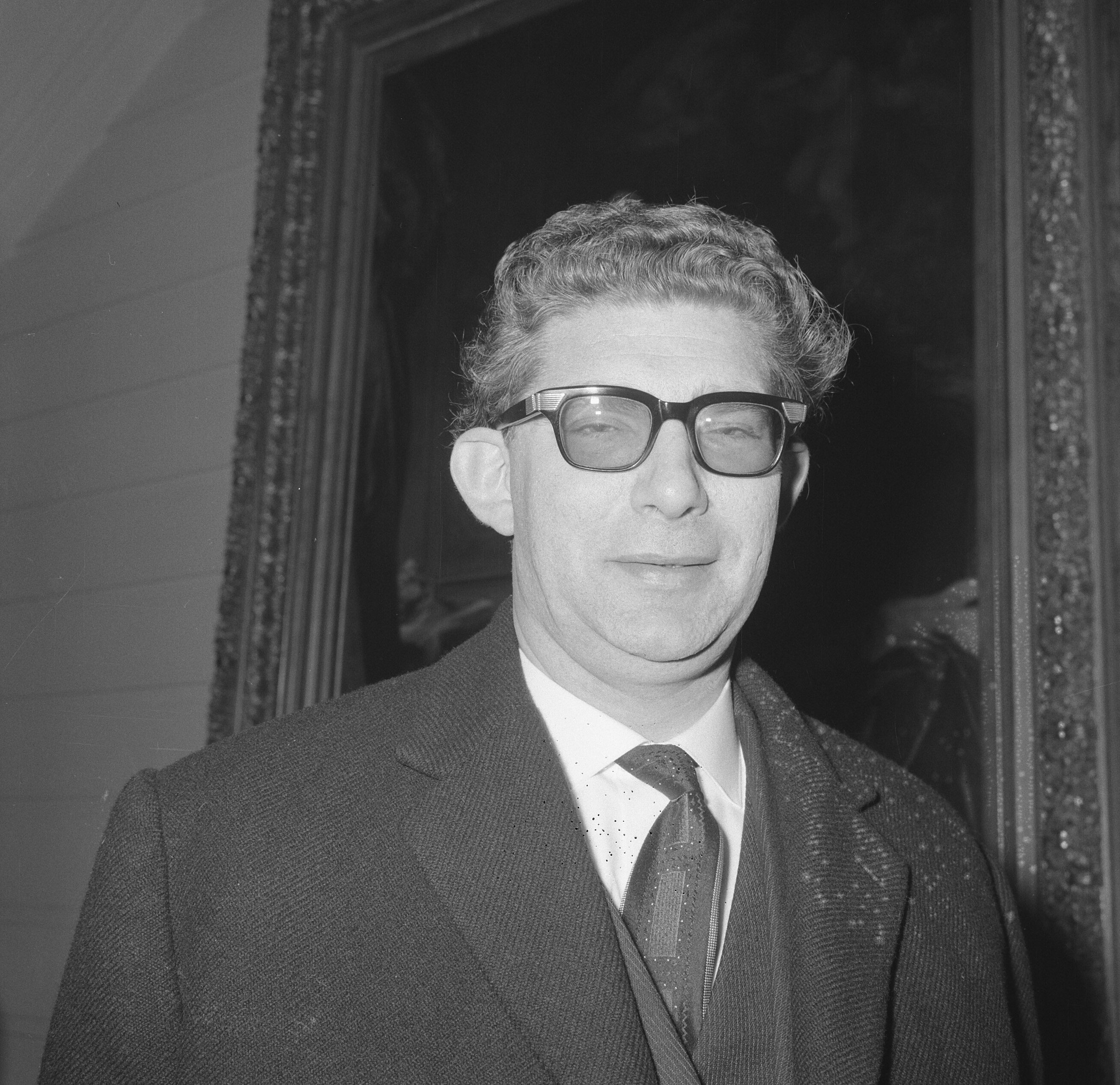
	First party	Second party	Third party
Leader	Paul Vanden Boeynants	André Cools	Karel Van Miert
Party	CVP	PS	sp.a
Leader since	Candidate for PM	1978	1978
Last election	56 seats, 26.20%	New	New
Seats won	57	31	26
Seat change	▲1	New	New
Popular vote	1,447,112	689,876	684,976
Percentage	26.14%	12.46%	12.37%
Swing	▼0.06%	New	New
	Fourth party	Fifth party	Sixth party
			PRLW
Leader	Charles-Ferdinand Nothomb	Willy De Clercq	André Damseaux
Party	cdH	Open Vld	PRLW
Leader since	1977	1977	1973
Last election	24 seats, 7.29%	17 seats, 8.54%	16 seats, 3.34%
Seats won	25	22	15
Seat change	▲1	▲5	▼1
Popular vote	560,440	573,387	256,685
Percentage	10.12%	10.36%	4.64%
Swing	▲2.83%	▲1.82%	▲1.30%
- Seat distribution by constituency for the Chamber of Deputies.
Government before election
Tindemans II
CVP-PSC-BSP/PSB-VU-FDF
Government after election
Vanden Boeynants II
CVP-PSC-PS-BSP-VU-FDF

General elections were held in Belgium on 17 December 1978. The Christian People's Party emerged as the largest party, with 57 of the 212 seats in the Chamber of Representatives and 29 of the 106 seats in the Senate. Voter turnout was 94.8%. Elections were also held for the nine provincial councils and for the Council of the German Cultural Community.

The snap elections were called after Prime Minister Leo Tindemans resigned over the Egmont pact, which would have transformed Belgium into a federal state. Vlaams Blok participated for the first time, which was formed out of disagreement within the People's Union over concessions in the Egmont pact.

== Results ==
=== Chamber of Representatives ===
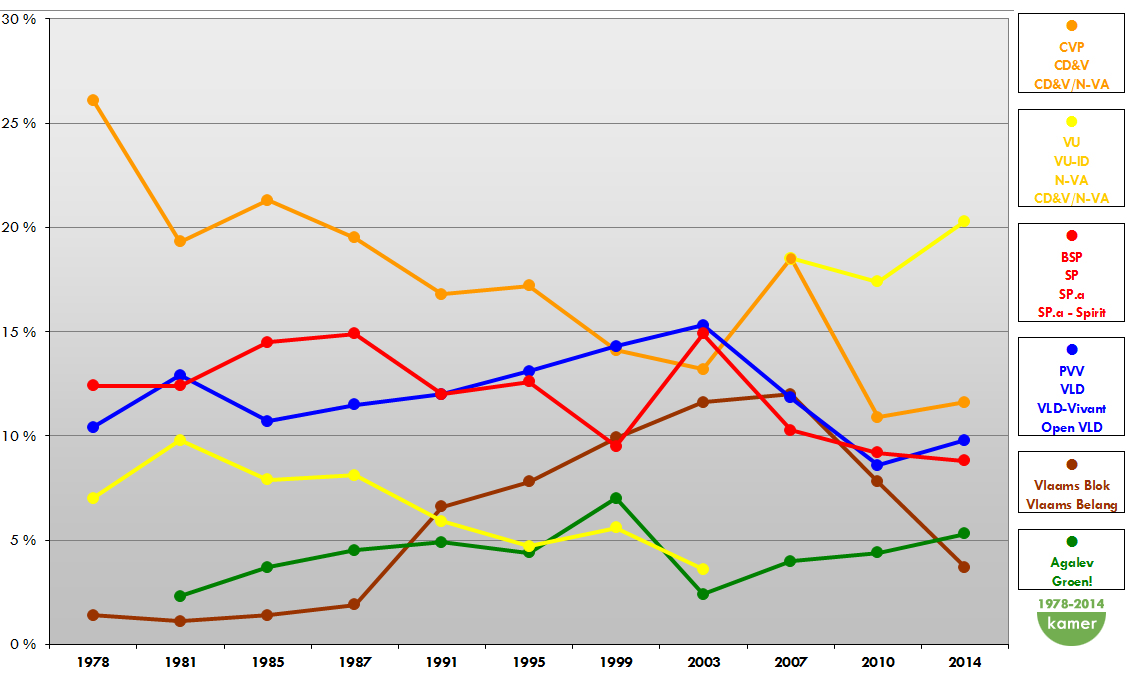
The primary six Flemish political parties and their results for the House of Representatives (Kamer). From 1978 to 2014, in percentages for the complete 'Kingdom'.

Party	Votes	%	Seats	+/–
Christian People's Party	1,447,112	26.14	57	+1
Belgian Socialist Party (Wallonia)	689,876	12.46	31	+31
Belgian Socialist Party (Flanders)	684,976	12.37	26	–1
Party for Freedom and Progress	573,387	10.36	22	+5
Christian Social Party	560,440	10.12	25	+1
People's Union	388,762	7.02	14	–6
Democratic Front of the Francophones	259,019	4.68	11	0
Party of Reforms and Freedom of Wallonia	256,685	4.64	15	–1
Communist Party of Belgium	180,234	3.26	4	+4
Walloon Rally	128,153	2.32	4	0
Vlaams Blok	75,635	1.37	1	New
Democratic Union for the Respect of Labour	48,616	0.88	1	+1
All Power to the Workers	43,483	0.79	0	New
Liberal Party (Wallonia)	41,460	0.75	0	New
PRLW–Party for Reforms and Freedom	31,280	0.57	0	0
Belgian Socialist Party (Luxembourg)	30,222	0.55	1	New
Ecolo	21,224	0.38	0	0
Walloon Liberal Party	9,861	0.18	0	New
Party of German-speaking Belgians	9,032	0.16	0	0
ECOLOG	8,360	0.15	0	0
Revolutionary Workers' League (Flanders)	6,383	0.12	0	0
Walloon Rally (Luxembourg)	6,493	0.12	0	New
Agalev	5,556	0.10	0	0
Ecology–Politics	3,922	0.07	0	New
Liberal, Social and Democratic Party	3,678	0.07	0	New
Belgian National Party	3,465	0.06	0	New
Revolutionary Workers' League (Wallonia)	2,597	0.05	0	0
Francophone Liberal Party	2,313	0.04	0	New
Belgian Progressive Party	2,123	0.04	0	New
Democratic and Progressive Union	1,843	0.03	0	0
Green	1,761	0.03	0	New
United Feminist Party	1,686	0.03	0	0
Progressive Front–Ecologists	1,512	0.03	0	New
Kaganovemus	1,376	0.02	0	0
Party for Free Communication and Environmental Protection	993	0.02	0	New
Party of New Forces	729	0.01	0	New
Liberal Party	698	0.01	0	New
PDE	375	0.01	0	New
PDRT	311	0.01	0	New
Total	5,535,631	100.00	212	0
Valid votes	5,535,631	91.61		
Invalid/blank votes	507,058	8.39		
Total votes	6,042,689	100.00		
Registered voters/turnout	6,366,655	94.91		
Source: Belgian Elections, Global Elections Database

=== Senate ===
Party	Votes	%	Seats	+/–
Christian People's Party	1,420,777	25.93	29	+1
Belgian Socialist Party (Wallonia)	685,307	12.51	17	–2
Belgian Socialist Party (Flanders)	678,776	12.39	13	+1
Party for Freedom and Progress	572,535	10.45	11	+2
Christian Social Party	535,939	9.78	12	+1
People's Union	384,562	7.02	7	–3
Party of Reforms and Freedom of Wallonia-PL	330,155	6.03	6	-1
Democratic Front of the Francophones	266,713	4.87	7	New
Communist Party of Belgium	182,711	3.33	1	0
Walloon Rally	123,794	2.26	2	0
Vlaams Blok	80,809	1.47	0	New
Democratic Union for the Respect of Labour	51,571	0.94	0	New
All Power to the Workers	44,379	0.81	0	New
Ecolo	43,883	0.80	0	0
Belgian Socialist Party (Luxembourg)	30,837	0.56	1	New
Party of German-speaking Belgians	11,148	0.20	0	0
Walloon Liberal Party	11,081	0.20	0	New
Walloon Rally (Luxembourg)	6,659	0.12	0	New
Revolutionary Workers' League	3,744	0.07	0	New
Liberal, Social and Democratic Party	3,239	0.06	0	New
Belgian Progressive Party	2,804	0.05	0	New
Francophone Liberal Party	2,640	0.05	0	New
Democratic and Progressive Union	2,221	0.04	0	0
United Feminist Party	2,045	0.04	0	0
Revolutionary Communist Party	917	0.02	0	New
Total	5,479,246	100.00	106	0
Valid votes	5,479,246	90.65		
Invalid/blank votes	565,299	9.35		
Total votes	6,044,545	100.00		
Registered voters/turnout	6,366,655	94.94		
Source: Belgian Elections
