= 1864 Belgian general election =

- 11 August 1864

All 116 seats in the Chamber of Representatives 57 seats needed for a majority
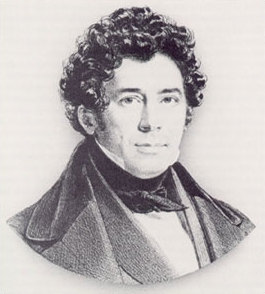

	First party	Second party
Leader	Charles Rogier
Party	Liberal	Catholic
Leader since	Candidate for PM
Seats before	59 seats	57 seats
Seats won	64	52
Seat change	▲5	▼5
Popular vote	39,576	39,750
Percentage	49.74%	49.96%
Government before election
Rogier II
Liberal
Government after election
Rogier II
Liberal

General elections were held in Belgium on 11 August 1864, the first full general elections since 1857. The snap elections were called upon the loss of a parliamentary majority for the liberal government of Charles Rogier and a hung parliament, following the death of liberal representative Charles Cumont on 10 July 1864. In the last few parliamentary sessions preceding the elections, all Catholic members quit the Chamber, resulting in it not being quorate. The Chamber was disbanded by order of 16 July.

Although the Catholics received the most votes for seats in the Chamber of Representatives, the result was a victory for the Liberal Party, which won 64 of the 116 seats. Liberals gained three seats in Bruges, one seat in Charleroi, two seats in Ghent, one seat in Namur and one seat in Soignies. Catholics gained one seat in Aalst, one seat in Tongeren and one seat in Waremme. This returned a parliamentary majority for the Liberals.

Voter turnout was 76.7%, although only 103,717 people (2.1% of the population) were eligible to vote.

== Results ==
=== Chamber of Representatives ===
Party	Votes	%	Seats	+/–
Catholics	39,750	49.96	52	–5
Liberal Party	39,576	49.74	64	+5
Others	240	0.30	0	New
Total	79,566	100.00	116	0
Total votes	79,566	–		
Registered voters/turnout	103,717	76.71		
Source: Mackie & Rose, Sternberger et al.
