= 1886 Belgian general election =

- 8 June 1886

69 of the 138 seats in the Chamber of Representatives 70 seats needed for a majority
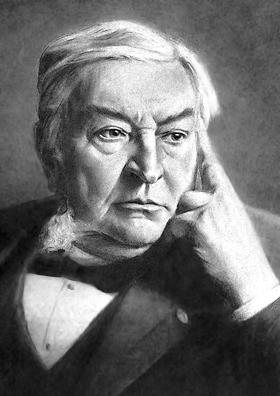

	First party	Second party
Leader	Auguste Beernaert
Party	Catholic	Liberal
Leader since	Candidate for PM
Seats before	86 seats	52 seats
Seats won	32	37
Seats after	98	40
Seat change	▲12	▼12
Popular vote	17,979	18,965
Percentage	48.67%	51.33%
Government before election
Beernaert
Catholic
Government after election
Beernaert
Catholic

Partial general elections were held in Belgium on 8 June 1886. In the elections for the Chamber of Representatives the result was a victory for the Catholic Party, which won 98 of the 138 seats.

Under the alternating system, elections were only held in four out of the nine provinces: Hainaut, Limburg, Liège and East Flanders.

The Catholics continued their gains, after the 1884 elections that gave them a victory over the Liberals. With the defeat of the Liberals by the Catholics in the eight-member arrondissement of Ghent, the Catholics now had all "Flemish" seats. Catholics also gained both seats of the arrondissement of Waremme and two out of seven in the arrondissement of Charleroi.

== Results ==
=== Chamber of Representatives ===
Party	Votes	%	Seats		
Party	Votes	%	Won	Total	+/–
Liberal Party	18,965	51.33	37	40	–12
Catholic Party	17,979	48.67	32	98	+12
Total	36,944	100.00	69	138	0
Total votes	36,944	–			
Registered voters/turnout	57,962	63.74			
Source: Mackie & Rose, Sternberger et al.
