= 1874 Belgian general election =

- 9 June 1874

61 of the 124 seats in the Chamber of Representatives 63 seats needed for a majority
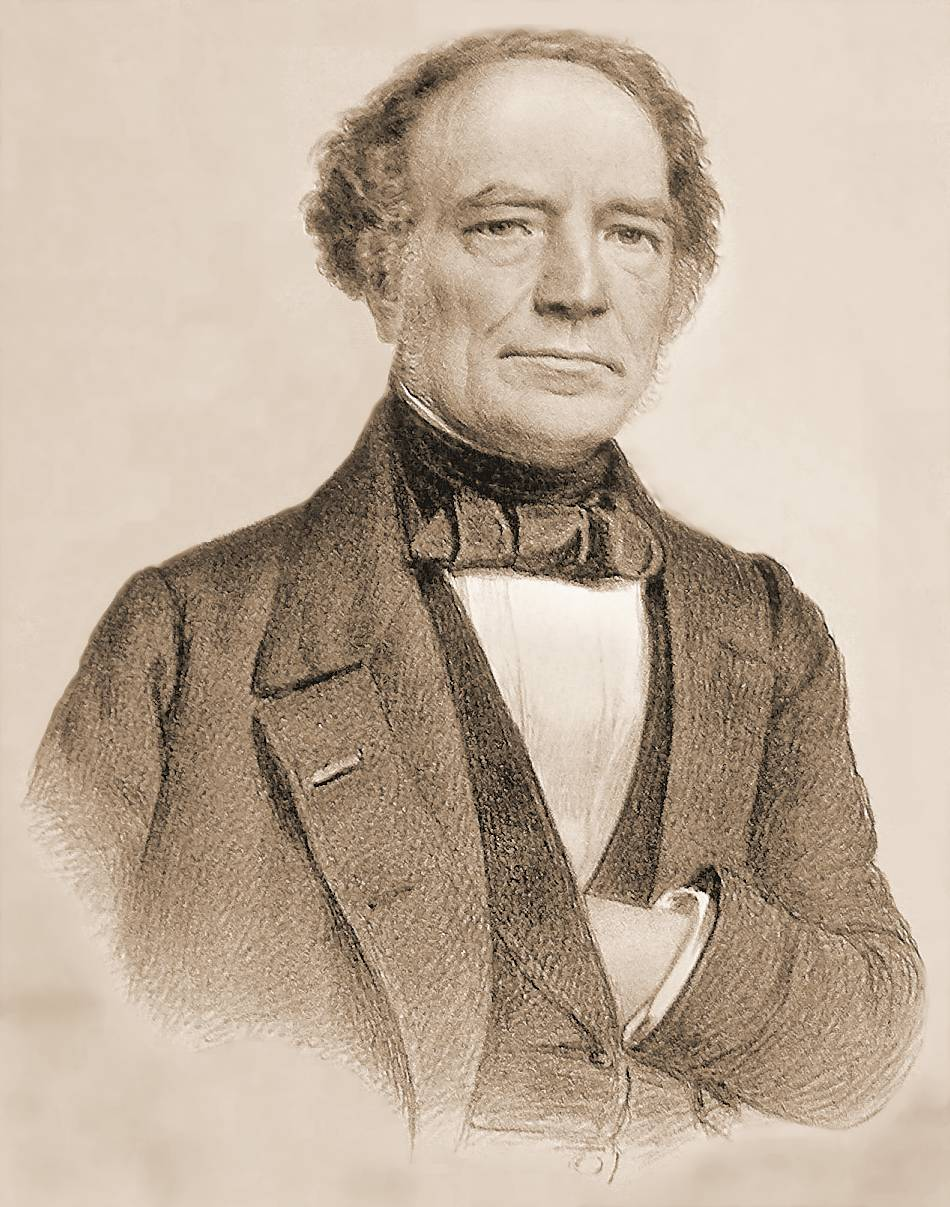

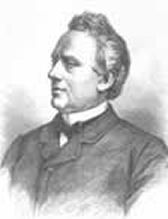
	First party	Second party
Leader	Barthélémy de Theux de Meylandt	Walthère Frère-Orban
Party	Catholic	Liberal
Leader since	Candidate for PM	Candidate for PM
Seats before	71 seats	53 seats
Seats won	26	35
Seats after	68	56
Seat change	▼3	▲3
Popular vote	15,864	17,531
Percentage	47.50%	52.50%
Government before election
de Theux de Meylandt III
Catholic
Government after election
de Theux de Meylandt III
Catholic

Partial general elections were held in Belgium on 9 June 1874. The result was a victory for the Catholic Party, which won 68 of the 124 seats in the Chamber of Representatives and 34 of the 62 seats in the Senate. Voter turnout was 64.1%, although only 52,074 people were eligible to vote.

Under the alternating system, elections for the Chamber of Representatives were only held in four out of the nine provinces: Hainaut, Limburg, Liège and East Flanders.

Incumbent Head of Government Barthélémy de Theux de Meylandt was re-elected in the arrondissement of Hasselt but died on 21 August 1874. A special election was held on 27 September 1874 to replace him, which Henri de Pitteurs-Hiegaerts won.

Additionally, a special election was held in the arrondissement of Tielt to replace Gustave de Mûelenaere, who died on 8 July 1874; this is of note as future Prime Minister Auguste Beernaert was elected to succeed him.

== Results ==
=== Chamber of Representatives ===
Party	Votes	%	Seats		
Party	Votes	%	Won	Total	+/–
Liberal Party	17,531	52.50	35	56	+3
Catholic Party	15,864	47.50	26	68	–3
Total	33,395	100.00	61	124	0
Total votes	33,395	–			
Registered voters/turnout	52,074	64.13			
Source: Mackie & Rose, Sternberger et al.

=== Senate ===
Party	Seats
Catholic Party	34
Liberal Party	28
Total	62
Source: Sternberger et al.
