= 1868 Belgian general election =

- 9 June 1868

63 of the 122 seats in the Chamber of Representatives 62 seats needed for a majority
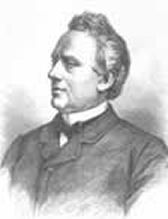

	First party	Second party
Leader	Walthère Frère-Orban
Party	Liberal	Catholic
Leader since	Candidate for PM
Seats before	70 seats	52 seats
Seats won	30	33
Seats after	72	50
Seat change	▲2	▼2
Popular vote	13,619	16,918
Percentage	44.33%	55.07%
Government before election
Frère-Orban I
Liberal
Government after election
Frère-Orban I
Liberal

General elections were held in Belgium on 9 June 1868. In the elections for the Chamber of Representatives the result was a victory for the Liberal Party, which won 72 of the 122 seats. Voter turnout was 55.6%, although only 55,297 people were eligible to vote.

Under the alternating system, elections were only held in five out of the nine provinces: Antwerp, Brabant, Luxembourg, Namur and West Flanders. A special election was held in the arrondissement of Tongeren.

== Results ==
=== Chamber of Representatives ===
Party	Votes	%	Seats		
Party	Votes	%	Won	Total	+/–
Catholics	16,918	55.07	33	50	–2
Liberal Party	13,619	44.33	30	72	+2
Others	184	0.60	0	0	New
Total	30,721	100.00	63	122	0
Total votes	30,721	–			
Registered voters/turnout	55,297	55.56			
Source: Mackie & Rose, Sternberger et al.
