= 1856 Belgian general election =

← 1854	10 June 1856	1857 →

54 of the 108 seats in the Chamber of Representatives 55 seats needed for a majority
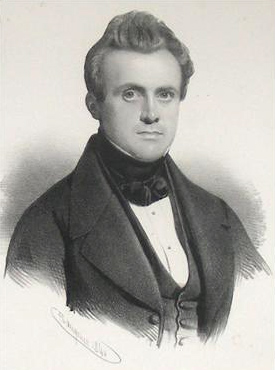

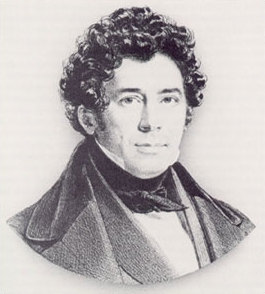
	First party	Second party
Leader	Pierre de Decker	Charles Rogier
Party	Catholic	Liberal
Seats before	54 seats	54 seats
Seats won	33	21
Seats after	63	45
Seat change	▲9	▼9
Popular vote	15,168	12,472
Percentage	54.88%	45.12%
Government before election
de Decker
Catholic-Liberal
Government after election
de Decker
Catholic-Liberal

Partial general elections were held in Belgium on 10 June 1856. In the elections for the Chamber of Representatives the result was a victory for the Catholics, who won 63 of the 108 seats. Voter turnout was 60.6%, although only 43,573 people were eligible to vote.

Under the alternating system, Chamber elections were only held in four out of the nine provinces: East Flanders, Hainaut, Liège and Limburg. Thus, 54 of the 108 Chamber seats were up for election.

== Results ==
=== Chamber of Representatives ===
Party	Votes	%	Seats		
Party	Votes	%	Won	Total	+/–
Catholics	15,168	54.88	33	63	+9
Liberal Party	12,472	45.12	21	45	–9
Total	27,640	100.00	54	108	0
Total votes	27,640	–			
Registered voters/turnout	45,573	60.65			
Source: Mackie & Rose, Sternberger et al.
