= 1861 Belgian general election =

- 11 June 1861

58 of the 116 seats in the Chamber of Representatives 57 seats needed for a majority
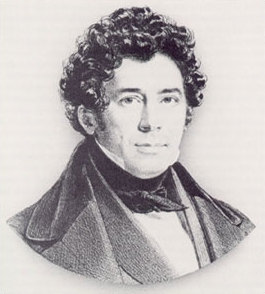

	First party	Second party
Leader	Charles Rogier
Party	Liberal	Catholic
Leader since	Candidate for PM
Seats before	69 seats	47 seats
Seats won	36	22
Seats after	66	50
Seat change	▼3	▲3
Popular vote	15,979	11,799
Percentage	57.52%	42.48%
Government before election
Rogier II
Liberal
Government after election
Rogier II
Liberal

Partial general elections were held in Belgium on 11 June 1861. In the elections for the Chamber of Representatives the result was a victory for the Liberal Party, which won 66 of the 116 seats. Voter turnout was 58.4%, although only 47,555 people were eligible to vote.

Under the alternating system, elections for the Chamber of Representatives were only held in four out of the nine provinces: Hainaut, Limburg, Liège and East Flanders.

== Results ==
=== Chamber of Representatives ===
Party	Votes	%	Seats		
Party	Votes	%	Won	Total	+/–
Liberal Party	15,979	57.52	36	66	–3
Catholics	11,799	42.48	22	50	+3
Total	27,778	100.00	58	116	0
Total votes	27,778	–			
Registered voters/turnout	47,555	58.41			
Source: Mackie & Rose, Sternberger et al.
