= 1841 Belgian general election =

← 1839	8 June 1841	1843 →

48 of the 95 seats in the Chamber of Representatives
Government before election
Nothomb
Liberal-Catholic
Government after election
Nothomb
Liberal-Catholic

Partial legislative elections were held in Belgium on Tuesday 8 June 1841 in which 48 of the 95 seats in the Chamber of Representatives were elected. Voter turnout was 77.0%, although only 24,887 people were eligible to vote. Under the alternating system, elections were only held in five out of the nine provinces: Antwerp, Brabant, Luxembourg, Namur and West Flanders.

The number of seats in the Chamber decreased from 98 to 95 following the 1839 independence of the Grand Duchy of Luxembourg; its three districts (Luxembourg, Grevenmacher and Diekirch) had one representative each.

The Lebeau Government, the first homogeneously Liberal government, resigned shortly before the elections. The unionist Nothomb Government took over on 13 April 1841.
