= 1857 Belgian general election =

← 1856	10 December 1857	1859 →

All 108 seats in the Chamber of Representatives 55 seats needed for a majority
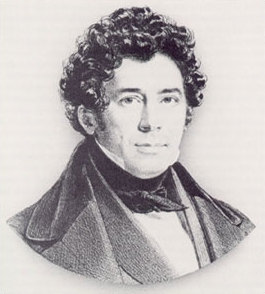

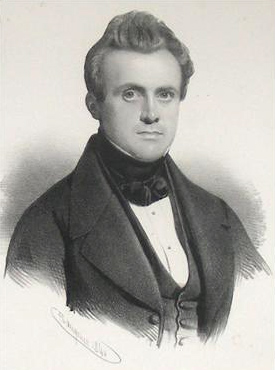
	First party	Second party
Leader	Charles Rogier	Pierre de Decker
Party	Liberal	Catholic
Last election	45 seats	63 seats
Seats won	70	38
Seat change	▲25	▼25
Popular vote	39,280	32,503
Percentage	54.72%	45.28%
Government before election
de Decker
Catholic-Liberal
Government after election
Rogier II
Liberal

General elections were held in Belgium on 10 December 1857, the first full general elections since 1848. The elections were called by royal order of 12 November 1857, dissolving the Chamber of Representatives that had convened in a new session only two days earlier.

Going into the elections, Liberals held a majority in the Senate and the Catholics in the Chamber of Representatives. The unionist (Catholic–liberal) De Decker government resigned and a liberal government led by Charles Rogier took over shortly before the elections were called.

In the elections for the Chamber of Representatives the result was a victory for the Liberal Party, which won 70 of the 108 seats. The Liberal Party now had a majority in both chambers of parliament.

Voter turnout was 79%, although only 90,543 men (2% of the country's population) were eligible to vote.

== Campaign ==
Twelve of the 108 seats were uncontested, of which the Liberals won three and the Catholics nine.

== Results ==
Party	Votes	%	Seats	+/–
Liberal Party	39,280	54.72	70	+25
Catholics	32,503	45.28	38	–25
Total	71,783	100.00	108	0
Total votes	71,783	–		
Registered voters/turnout	90,543	79.28		
Source: Mackie & Rose, Sternberger et al.
