= 1845 Belgian general election =

| ← 1843 | 10 June 1845 | 1847 → |

48 of the 95 seats in the Chamber of Representatives
Government before election
Nothomb
Liberal-Catholic
Government after election
Van de Weyer
Liberal-Catholic

Partial legislative elections were held in Belgium on 10 June 1845 in which 48 of the 95 seats in the Chamber of Representatives were elected. Voter turnout was 77.0%, although only 22,771 people were eligible to vote.

Under the alternating system, Chamber elections were held in only five out of the nine provinces: Antwerp, Brabant, Luxembourg, Namur and West Flanders. The Senate was not up for election this year.
