= 1848 Belgian general election =

← 1847	13 June 1848	1850 →

All 108 seats in the Chamber of Representatives 55 seats needed for a majority
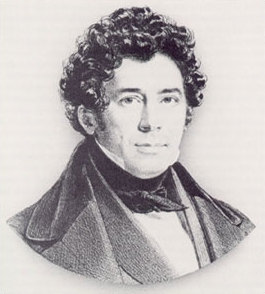

	First party	Second party
Leader	Charles Rogier
Party	Liberal	Catholic
Leader since	Candidate for PM
Seats before	55 seats	53 seats
Seats won	83	25
Seat change	▲28	▼28
Popular vote	30,806	13,122
Percentage	69.52%	29.61%
Government before election
Rogier I
Liberal
Government after election
Rogier I
Liberal

Full general elections were held in Belgium on 13 June 1848. They followed an equalisation of the tax qualifications for voters, which widened the franchise from 1.0% of the population to 1.8%. Unlike the previous rules which had favoured Conservatives and Catholics (as the requirements were lower in the countryside), this benefitted the Liberal Party and damaged the Catholics, who lost more than half their seats.

== Background ==
The existing electoral law differentiated in tax requirements between cities and countryside; cities (where Liberals were stronger) had to pay higher taxes in order to vote, compared to the countryside (where Catholics were stronger).

The Liberal Party held its founding congress two years earlier, on 13 June 1846, where it approved a proposal to lower the tax requirements in order to expand suffrage. By 1848, in the context of the Revolutions of 1848, reform was unavoidable. On the proposal of Liberal head of government Charles Rogier, the Parliament approved the law of 12 March 1848, which equalised and lowered the tax requirements to its constitutional minimum.

The new law benefited the Liberals, leading them to victory in these elections. The Liberals would retain their dominant position for the most part until 1884.

== Campaign ==
One Chamber seat was uncontested, and won by the Liberal Party.

== Results ==
=== Chamber of Representatives ===
Party	Votes	%	Seats	+/–
Liberal Party	30,806	69.52	83	+28
Catholics	13,122	29.61	25	–28
Others	383	0.86	0	0
Total	44,311	100.00	108	0
Total votes	44,311	–		
Registered voters/turnout	79,076	56.04		
Source: Sternberger et al., Mackie & Rose

The vote figures do not include the constituency of Oudenaarde.

=== Senate ===
Party	Seats	+/–
Liberal Party	31	+11
Catholics	22	–10
Others	1	+1
Total	54	0
Source: Sternberger et al.
