= 1833 Belgian general election =

← 1831	23 May 1833	1835 →

All 102 seats in the Chamber of Representatives
Government before election
Goblet d'Alviella
Liberal-Catholic
Government after election
Goblet d'Alviella
Liberal-Catholic

General elections were held in Belgium in 1833. In the Senate elections Catholics won 31 seats and Liberals seven. Only 46,000 people (1.1% of the country's population) were eligible to vote.

The Chamber of Representatives was fully renewed, following its dissolution by royal order of 28 April 1833. The King did so because of conflicts between the Liberal government (of Albert Goblet d'Alviella and Charles Rogier) and the Catholic-majority Parliament. The Chamber elections were held on 23 May 1833, with a run-off on 30 May. On 21 May 1833, just a few days before the elections, the government secured a significant diplomatic victory with the Convention of London, an agreement with the Netherlands to extend the ceasefire for an indefinite period.

== Results ==
=== Senate ===
Party	Seats	+/–
Catholics	31	0
Liberals	7	+3
Independents	13	–3
Total	51	0
Source: Sternberger et al.
