= List of prime ministers of Belgium =

The prime minister of Belgium (Dutch: Eerste minister van België; French: Premier ministre de Belgique; German: Premierminister von Belgien) or the premier of Belgium is the head of the federal government in the Kingdom of Belgium.

Although leaders of Government (French: Chefs de Cabinet) had been appointed since the independence of the country, until 1918 the king often presided over the Council of Ministers, so the modern era of the "premiership" started after World War I with Léon Delacroix. The political importance of the king of the Belgians has decreased over time, whereas the position of prime minister has gradually become more important.

== Chiefs of government (1831–1918) ==
Political parties

Independent
Catholic Party
Liberal Party

N°	Portrait	Name (Born–Died)	Term of office			Political Party	Election	Cabinet	Monarch of Belgium (Reign)
N°	Portrait	Name (Born–Died)	Took office	Left office	Time in office	Political Party	Election	Cabinet	Monarch of Belgium (Reign)
1		Étienne Constantin de Gerlache (1785–1871)	27 February 1831	10 March 1831	11 days	Independent (Confessional)	1830	De Gerlache	None (Érasme-Louis as regent of Belgium)
2		Joseph Lebeau (1794–1865)	10 March 1831	24 July 1831	136 days	Independent (Liberal)	—	Lebeau I	None (Érasme-Louis as regent of Belgium)
2		Joseph Lebeau (1794–1865)	10 March 1831	24 July 1831	136 days	Independent (Liberal)	—	Lebeau I	Leopold I (1831–1865)
3		Félix de Muelenaere (1793–1862)	24 July 1831	20 October 1832	1 year, 88 days	Independent (Confessional)	1831	De Mûelenaere	Leopold I (1831–1865)
4		Albert Joseph Goblet d'Alviella (1790–1873)	20 October 1832	4 August 1834	1 year, 288 days	Independent (Liberal)	1833	Goblet d'Alviella— Rogier	Leopold I (1831–1865)
5		Barthélémy de Theux de Meylandt (1794–1874)	4 August 1834	18 April 1840	5 years, 258 days	Independent (Confessional)	1835; 1837; 1839	De Theux de Meylandt I	Leopold I (1831–1865)
6		Joseph Lebeau (1794–1865)	18 April 1840	13 April 1841	360 days	Independent (Liberal)	—	Lebeau II	Leopold I (1831–1865)
7		Jean-Baptiste Nothomb (1805–1881)	13 April 1841	30 July 1845	4 years, 108 days	Independent (Liberal)	1841; 1843	Nothomb	Leopold I (1831–1865)
8		Sylvain Van de Weyer (1802–1874)	30 July 1845	31 March 1846	244 days	Independent (Liberal)	1845	Van de Weyer	Leopold I (1831–1865)
9		Barthélémy de Theux de Meylandt (1794–1874)	31 March 1846	12 August 1847	1 year, 134 days	Independent (Confessional)	—	De Theux de Meylandt II	Leopold I (1831–1865)
10		Charles Rogier (1800–1885)	12 August 1847	31 October 1852	5 years, 80 days	Liberal Party	1847; 1848; 1850	Rogier I Liberal	Leopold I (1831–1865)
11		Henri de Brouckère (1801–1891)	31 October 1852	30 March 1855	2 years, 150 days	Liberal Party	1852; 1854	De Brouckère; Liberal	Leopold I (1831–1865)
12		Pierre de Decker (1812–1891)	30 March 1855	9 November 1857	2 years, 224 days	Independent (Confessional)	1855; 1856	De Decker; Catholic–Liberal	Leopold I (1831–1865)
13		Charles Rogier (1800–1885)	9 November 1857	3 January 1868	10 years, 55 days	Liberal Party	1857; 1859; 1861; 1863; 1864; 1866; 1867	Rogier II; Liberal	Leopold I (1831–1865)
13		Charles Rogier (1800–1885)	9 November 1857	3 January 1868	10 years, 55 days	Liberal Party	1857; 1859; 1861; 1863; 1864; 1866; 1867	Rogier II; Liberal	Leopold II (1865–1909)
14		Walthère Frère-Orban (1812–1896)	3 January 1868	2 July 1870	2 years, 180 days	Liberal Party	1868	Frère-Orban I Liberal	Leopold II (1865–1909)
15		Jules d'Anethan (1803–1888)	2 July 1870	7 December 1871	1 year, 158 days	Catholic Party	Jun.1870; Aug.1870	D'Anethan; Catholic	Leopold II (1865–1909)
16		Barthélémy de Theux de Meylandt (1794–1874)	7 December 1871	21 August 1874 #	2 years, 257 days	Catholic Party	1872; 1874	Malou I Catholic	Leopold II (1865–1909)
17		Jules Malou (1810–1886)	21 August 1874	19 June 1878	3 years, 302 days	Catholic Party	1876	Malou I Catholic	Leopold II (1865–1909)
18		Walthère Frère-Orban (1812–1891)	19 June 1878	16 June 1884	5 years, 363 days	Liberal Party	1878; 1880; 1882	Frère-Orban II; Liberal	Leopold II (1865–1909)
19		Jules Malou (1810–1886)	16 June 1884	26 October 1884	132 days	Catholic Party	1884	Malou II; Catholic	Leopold II (1865–1909)
20		Auguste Beernaert (1829–1912)	26 October 1884	26 March 1894	9 years, 151 days	Catholic Party	1886; 1888; 1890; 1892	Beernaert; Catholic	Leopold II (1865–1909)
21		Jules de Burlet (1844–1897)	26 March 1894	25 February 1896	1 year, 336 days	Catholic Party	1894	De Burlet; Catholic	Leopold II (1865–1909)
22		Paul de Smet de Naeyer (1843–1913)	25 February 1896	24 January 1899	2 years, 333 days	Catholic Party	1896; 1898	De Smet de Naeyer I Catholic	Leopold II (1865–1909)
23		Jules Vandenpeereboom (1843–1917)	24 January 1899	5 August 1899	193 days	Catholic Party	—	Vandenpeereboom; Catholic	Leopold II (1865–1909)
24		Paul de Smet de Naeyer (1843–1913)	5 August 1899	2 May 1907	7 years, 270 days	Catholic Party	1900; 1902; 1904; 1906	De Smet de Naeyer II; Catholic	Leopold II (1865–1909)
25		Jules de Trooz (1857–1907)	2 May 1907	31 December 1907 #	243 days	Catholic Party	—	De Trooz; Catholic	Leopold II (1865–1909)
26		Frans Schollaert (1851–1917)	9 January 1908	17 June 1911	3 years, 159 days	Catholic Party	1908; 1910	Schollaert; Catholic	Leopold II (1865–1909)
26		Frans Schollaert (1851–1917)	9 January 1908	17 June 1911	3 years, 159 days	Catholic Party	1908; 1910	Schollaert; Catholic	Albert I (1909–1934)
27		Charles de Broqueville (1860–1940)	17 June 1911	18 January 1916	6 years, 349 days	Catholic Party	1912; 1914	De Broqueville I (in exile, 1914–1918); Catholic (until 1916); Catholic–Liberal–BWP/POB (from 1916)	Albert I (1909–1934)
27		Charles de Broqueville (1860–1940)	18 January 1916	1 June 1918	6 years, 349 days	Catholic Party	—	De Broqueville I (in exile, 1914–1918); Catholic (until 1916); Catholic–Liberal–BWP/POB (from 1916)	Albert I (1909–1934)
28		Gérard Cooreman (1852–1926)	1 June 1918	21 November 1918	173 days	Catholic Party	—	Cooreman; Catholic–Liberal–BWP/POB	Albert I (1909–1934)

== Prime ministers (1918–present) ==
Political parties

Christian democrat

Catholic Party
Christian Social Party
Christian Democratic and Flemish

Liberal

Liberal Party
Flemish Liberals and Democrats
Reformist Movement

Socialist

Belgian Labour Party
Belgian Socialist Party
Socialist Party

Flemish nationalist

New Flemish Alliance

N°	Portrait	Name (Born–Died)	Term of office			Political Party	Election	Cabinet	Monarch of Belgium (Reign)
N°	Portrait	Name (Born–Died)	Took office	Left office	Time in office	Political Party	Election	Cabinet	Monarch of Belgium (Reign)
29		Léon Delacroix (1867–1929)	21 November 1918	2 December 1919	1 year, 365 days	Catholic Party	—	Delacroix I Catholic–Liberal–BWP/POB	Albert I (1909–1934)
29		Léon Delacroix (1867–1929)	2 December 1919	20 November 1920	1 year, 365 days	Catholic Party	1919	Delacroix II; Catholic–Liberal–BWP/POB	Albert I (1909–1934)
30		Henry Carton de Wiart (1869–1951)	20 November 1920	16 December 1921	1 year, 26 days	Catholic Party	—	Carton de Wiart; Catholic–Liberal–BWP/POB	Albert I (1909–1934)
31		Georges Theunis (1873–1966)	16 December 1921	13 May 1925	3 years, 148 days	Catholic Party	1921	Theunis I Catholic–Liberal	Albert I (1909–1934)
32		Aloys Van de Vyvere (1871–1961)	13 May 1925	17 June 1925	35 days	Catholic Party	1925	Van de Vyvere; Catholic	Albert I (1909–1934)
33		Prosper Poullet (1868–1937)	17 June 1925	20 May 1926	337 days	Catholic Party	—	Poullet— Vandervelde; Catholic–BWP/POB	Albert I (1909–1934)
34		Henri Jaspar (1870–1939)	20 May 1926	22 November 1927	5 years, 17 days	Catholic Party	—	Jaspar I Catholic–Liberal–BWP/POB	Albert I (1909–1934)
34		Henri Jaspar (1870–1939)	22 November 1927	6 June 1931	5 years, 17 days	Catholic Party	1929	Jaspar II; Catholic–Liberal	Albert I (1909–1934)
35		Jules Renkin (1862–1934)	6 June 1931	22 October 1932	1 year, 138 days	Catholic Party	—	Renkin; Catholic–Liberal	Albert I (1909–1934)
36		Charles de Broqueville (1860–1940)	22 October 1932	20 November 1934	2 years, 29 days	Catholic Party	1932	De Broqueville II; Catholic–Liberal	Albert I (1909–1934)
36		Charles de Broqueville (1860–1940)	22 October 1932	20 November 1934	2 years, 29 days	Catholic Party	1932	De Broqueville II; Catholic–Liberal	Leopold III (1934–1951)
37		Georges Theunis (1873–1966)	20 November 1934	25 March 1935	125 days	Catholic Party	—	Theunis II; Catholic–Liberal	Leopold III (1934–1951)
38		Paul van Zeeland (1893–1973)	25 March 1935	13 June 1936	2 years, 244 days	Catholic Party	—	Van Zeeland I Catholic–Liberal–BWP/POB	Leopold III (1934–1951)
38		Paul van Zeeland (1893–1973)	13 June 1936	24 November 1937	2 years, 244 days	Catholic Party	1936	Van Zeeland II; Catholic–Liberal–BWP/POB	Leopold III (1934–1951)
39		Paul-Émile Janson (1873–1944)	24 November 1937	15 May 1938	172 days	Liberal Party	—	Janson; Catholic–Liberal–BWP/POB	Leopold III (1934–1951)
40		Paul-Henri Spaak (1899–1972)	15 May 1938	22 February 1939	283 days	Belgian Labour Party	—	Spaak I Catholic–Liberal–BWP/POB	Leopold III (1934–1951)
41		Hubert Pierlot (1883–1963)	22 February 1939	16 April 1939	5 years, 356 days	Catholic Party	1939	Pierlot I Catholic–Liberal–BSP/PSB	Leopold III (1934–1951)
41		Hubert Pierlot (1883–1963)	16 April 1939	3 September 1939	5 years, 356 days	Catholic Party	—	Pierlot II; Catholic–Liberal–BSP/PSB	Leopold III (1934–1951)
41		Hubert Pierlot (1883–1963)	3 September 1939	28 May 1940	5 years, 356 days	Catholic Party	—	Pierlot III; Catholic–Liberal–BSP/PSB	Leopold III (1934–1951)
41		Hubert Pierlot (1883–1963)	28 May 1940	27 September 1944	5 years, 356 days	Catholic Party	—	Pierlot IV (in exile); Catholic–Liberal–BSP/PSB	Leopold III (1934–1951)
41		Hubert Pierlot (1883–1963)	27 September 1944	12 December 1944	5 years, 356 days	Catholic Party	—	Pierlot V Catholic–Liberal–BSP/PSB–KPB-PCB	Leopold III (1934–1951)
41		Hubert Pierlot (1883–1963)	12 December 1944	12 February 1945	5 years, 356 days	Catholic Party	—	Pierlot VI; Catholic–Liberal–BSP/PSB	Leopold III (1934–1951)
42		Achille Van Acker (1898–1975)	12 February 1945	2 August 1945	1 year, 29 days	Belgian Socialist Party	—	Van Acker I BSP/PSB–Catholic–Liberal	Leopold III (1934–1951)
42		Achille Van Acker (1898–1975)	2 August 1945	13 March 1946	1 year, 29 days	Belgian Socialist Party	—	Van Acker II; BSP/PSB–BDU/UDB–Liberal–KPB-PCB	Leopold III (1934–1951)
43		Paul-Henri Spaak (1899–1972)	13 March 1946	31 March 1946	18 days	Belgian Socialist Party	1946	Spaak II; BSP/PSB–PSC/CVP	Leopold III (1934–1951)
44		Achille Van Acker (1898–1975)	31 March 1946	3 August 1946	125 days	Belgian Socialist Party	—	Van Acker III; BSP/PSB–LP/PL–KPB-PCB	Leopold III (1934–1951)
45		Camille Huysmans (1871–1968)	3 August 1946	20 March 1947	229 days	Belgian Socialist Party	—	Huysmans; BSP/PSB–LP/PL–KPB-PCB	Leopold III (1934–1951)
46		Paul-Henri Spaak (1899–1972)	20 March 1947	27 November 1948	2 years, 144 days	Belgian Socialist Party	—	Spaak III; BSP/PSB–PSC/CVP	Leopold III (1934–1951)
46		Paul-Henri Spaak (1899–1972)	27 November 1948	11 August 1949	2 years, 144 days	Belgian Socialist Party	—	Spaak IV; BSP/PSB–PSC/CVP	Leopold III (1934–1951)
47		Gaston Eyskens (1905–1988)	11 August 1949	8 June 1950	301 days	Christian Social Party	1949	G.Eyskens I PSC/CVP–LP/PL	Leopold III (1934–1951)
48		Jean Duvieusart (1900–1977)	8 June 1950	16 August 1950	69 days	Christian Social Party	1950	Duvieusart; PSC/CVP	Leopold III (1934–1951)
49		Joseph Pholien (1884–1968)	16 August 1950	15 January 1952	1 year, 152 days	Christian Social Party	—	Pholien; PSC/CVP	Leopold III (1934–1951)
49		Joseph Pholien (1884–1968)	16 August 1950	15 January 1952	1 year, 152 days	Christian Social Party	—	Pholien; PSC/CVP	Baudouin (1951–1993)
50		Jean Van Houtte (1907–1991)	15 January 1952	23 April 1954	2 years, 98 days	Christian Social Party	—	Van Houtte; PSC/CVP	Baudouin (1951–1993)
51		Achille Van Acker (1898–1975)	23 April 1954	26 June 1958	4 years, 64 days	Belgian Socialist Party	1954	Van Acker IV; BSP/PSB–LP/PL	Baudouin (1951–1993)
52		Gaston Eyskens (1905–1988)	26 June 1958	6 November 1958	2 years, 303 days	Christian Social Party	1958	G.Eyskens II; PSC/CVP	Baudouin (1951–1993)
52		Gaston Eyskens (1905–1988)	6 November 1958	3 September 1960	2 years, 303 days	Christian Social Party	—	G.Eyskens III; PSC/CVP–LP/PL	Baudouin (1951–1993)
52		Gaston Eyskens (1905–1988)	3 September 1960	25 April 1961	2 years, 303 days	Christian Social Party	—	G.Eyskens IV; PSC/CVP–LP/PL	Baudouin (1951–1993)
53		Théo Lefèvre (1914–1973)	25 April 1961	28 July 1965	4 years, 94 days	Christian Social Party	1961	Lefèvre; PSC/CVP–BSP/PSB	Baudouin (1951–1993)
54		Pierre Harmel (1911–2009)	28 July 1965	19 March 1966	234 days	Christian Social Party	1965	Harmel; PSC/CVP–BSP/PSB	Baudouin (1951–1993)
55		Paul Vanden Boeynants (1919–2001)	19 March 1966	17 July 1968	2 years, 120 days	Christian Social Party	—	Vanden Boeynants I PSC/CVP–PVV/PLP	Baudouin (1951–1993)
56		Gaston Eyskens (1905–1988)	17 July 1968	20 January 1972	4 years, 193 days	Christian People's Party	1968	G.Eyskens V CVP/PSC–BSP/PSB	Baudouin (1951–1993)
56		Gaston Eyskens (1905–1988)	20 January 1972	26 January 1973	4 years, 193 days	Christian People's Party	1971	G.Eyskens VI; CVP/PSC–BSP/PSB	Baudouin (1951–1993)
57		Edmond Leburton (1915–1997)	26 January 1973	23 October 1973	1 year, 89 days	Belgian Socialist Party	—	Leburton I BSP/PSB–CVP/PSC–PVV/PLP	Baudouin (1951–1993)
57		Edmond Leburton (1915–1997)	23 October 1973	25 April 1974	1 year, 89 days	Belgian Socialist Party	—	Leburton II; BSP/PSB–CVP/PSC	Baudouin (1951–1993)
58		Leo Tindemans (1922–2014)	25 April 1974	3 June 1977	4 years, 178 days	Christian People's Party	1974	Tindemans I CVP/PSC–PVV/PLP	Baudouin (1951–1993)
58		Leo Tindemans (1922–2014)	3 June 1977	20 October 1978	4 years, 178 days	Christian People's Party	1977	Tindemans II; CVP/PSC–VU/FDF	Baudouin (1951–1993)
59		Paul Vanden Boeynants (1919–2001)	20 October 1978	3 April 1979	165 days	Christian Social Party	—	Vanden Boeynants II; CVP/PSC–SP/PS–VU/FDF	Baudouin (1951–1993)
60		Wilfried Martens (1936–2013)	3 April 1979	23 January 1980	1 year, 362 days	Christian People's Party	1978	Martens I CVP/PSC–SP/PS–VU/FDF	Baudouin (1951–1993)
60		Wilfried Martens (1936–2013)	23 January 1980	18 May 1980	1 year, 362 days	Christian People's Party	—	Martens II; CVP/PSC–SP/PS	Baudouin (1951–1993)
60		Wilfried Martens (1936–2013)	18 May 1980	22 October 1980	1 year, 362 days	Christian People's Party	—	Martens III; CVP/PSC–SP/PS–PVV/PRL	Baudouin (1951–1993)
60		Wilfried Martens (1936–2013)	22 October 1980	31 March 1981	1 year, 362 days	Christian People's Party	—	Martens IV; CVP/PSC–SP/PS	Baudouin (1951–1993)
61		Mark Eyskens (born 1933)	31 March 1981	17 December 1981	261 days	Christian People's Party	—	M.Eyskens; CVP/PSC–SP/PS	Baudouin (1951–1993)
62		Wilfried Martens (1936–2013)	17 December 1981	28 November 1985	10 years, 81 days	Christian People's Party	1981	Martens V CVP/PSC-PVV/PRL	Baudouin (1951–1993)
62		Wilfried Martens (1936–2013)	28 November 1985	21 October 1987	10 years, 81 days	Christian People's Party	1985	Martens VI; CVP/PSC-PVV/PRL	Baudouin (1951–1993)
62		Wilfried Martens (1936–2013)	21 October 1987	9 May 1988	10 years, 81 days	Christian People's Party	1987	Martens VII; CVP/PSC-PVV/PRL	Baudouin (1951–1993)
62		Wilfried Martens (1936–2013)	9 May 1988	29 September 1991	10 years, 81 days	Christian People's Party	—	Martens VIII; CVP/PSC–SP/PS–VU/FDF	Baudouin (1951–1993)
62		Wilfried Martens (1936–2013)	29 September 1991	7 March 1992	10 years, 81 days	Christian People's Party	1991	Martens IX; CVP/PSC–SP/PS	Baudouin (1951–1993)
63		Jean-Luc Dehaene (1940–2014)	7 March 1992	21 May 1995	7 years, 127 days	Christian People's Party	—	Dehaene I CVP/PSC–SP/PS	Baudouin (1951–1993)
63		Jean-Luc Dehaene (1940–2014)	7 March 1992	21 May 1995	7 years, 127 days	Christian People's Party	—	Dehaene I CVP/PSC–SP/PS	Albert II (1993–2013)
63		Jean-Luc Dehaene (1940–2014)	21 May 1995	12 July 1999	7 years, 127 days	Christian People's Party	1995	Dehaene II; CVP/PSC–SP/PS	Albert II (1993–2013)
64		Guy Verhofstadt (born 1953)	12 July 1999	12 July 2003	8 years, 252 days	Flemish Liberals and Democrats	1999	Verhofstadt I VLD/PRL–SP.A/PS–Agalev/Ecolo	Albert II (1993–2013)
64		Guy Verhofstadt (born 1953)	12 July 2003	21 December 2007	8 years, 252 days	Flemish Liberals and Democrats	2003	Verhofstadt II; VLD/MR–SP.A/PS	Albert II (1993–2013)
64		Guy Verhofstadt (born 1953)	21 December 2007	20 March 2008	8 years, 252 days	Open Flemish Liberals and Democrats	2007	Verhofstadt III; Open VLD/MR–CD&V/CDH–PS	Albert II (1993–2013)
65		Yves Leterme (born 1960)	20 March 2008	30 December 2008	285 days	Christian Democratic and Flemish	—	Leterme I CD&V/CDH–PS–Open Vld/MR	Albert II (1993–2013)
66		Herman Van Rompuy (born 1947)	30 December 2008	25 November 2009	330 days	Christian Democratic and Flemish	—	Van Rompuy; CD&V/CDH–Open Vld/MR–PS	Albert II (1993–2013)
67		Yves Leterme (born 1960)	25 November 2009	6 December 2011	2 years, 11 days	Christian Democratic and Flemish	—	Leterme II; CD&V/CDH–Open Vld/MR–PS	Albert II (1993–2013)
68		Elio Di Rupo (born 1951)	6 December 2011	11 October 2014	2 years, 309 days	Socialist Party	2010	Di Rupo; SP.A/PS–CD&V/CDH–Open Vld/MR	Albert II (1993–2013)
68		Elio Di Rupo (born 1951)	6 December 2011	11 October 2014	2 years, 309 days	Socialist Party	2010	Di Rupo; SP.A/PS–CD&V/CDH–Open Vld/MR	Philippe (2013–present)
69		Charles Michel (born 1975)	11 October 2014	21 December 2018	5 years, 16 days	Reformist Movement	2014	Michel I Open Vld/MR–N-VA–CD&V	Philippe (2013–present)
69		Charles Michel (born 1975)	21 December 2018	27 October 2019	5 years, 16 days	Reformist Movement	—	Michel II; Open Vld/MR–CD&V	Philippe (2013–present)
70		Sophie Wilmès (born 1975)	27 October 2019	17 March 2020	340 days	Reformist Movement	—	Wilmès I Open Vld/MR–CD&V	Philippe (2013–present)
70		Sophie Wilmès (born 1975)	17 March 2020	1 October 2020	340 days	Reformist Movement	2019	Wilmès II; Open Vld/MR–CD&V	Philippe (2013–present)
71		Alexander De Croo (born 1975)	1 October 2020	3 February 2025	4 years, 125 days	Open Flemish Liberals and Democrats	—	De Croo; Open Vld/MR–SP.A/PS–Groen/Ecolo–CD&V	Philippe (2013–present)
72		Bart De Wever (born 1970)	3 February 2025	incumbent	1 year, 267 days	New Flemish Alliance	2024	De Wever; N-VA–MR–Vooruit–CD&V–LE	Philippe (2013–present)

== See also ==
- List of Belgian monarchs
- List of prime ministers of Belgium by political affiliation
- List of prime ministers of Belgium by time in office
