= List of elections in Belgium =

This is an overview of all regular elections held in the Kingdom of Belgium since its independence. This excludes local referendums and special elections (by-elections) that existed before 1919. Municipal elections prior to 1919 are not listed either.

== Constituent elections (1830) ==
Elections to the temporary National Congress:

- 3 November 1830

== Unitary state (1831–1994) ==
=== Elections in 1831–1919 ===
Representatives were elected for a 4-year term; half of the Chamber was up for election each two years. Senators were elected for an 8-year term; half of the Senate was up for election each four years. The first series (referenced as "E" here) consisted of the provinces of East Flanders, Hainaut, Liège and Limburg; the second series ("A" below) of Antwerp, Brabant, Luxembourg, Namur and West Flanders.

An equivalent system applied to elections for municipal and provincial councils.

Year	Provincial elections	Legislative elections
1831	—	29 August 1831
1833	—	23 May 1833 (full: Chamber fully renewed following its dissolution)
1835	—	9 June 1835 (partial: Chamber E and Senate E)
Municipal law and provincial law of 1836
1836	29 September 1836 (full)	—
1837	—	13 June 1837 (partial: Chamber A)
1838	28 May 1838 (partial)	—
1839	—	11 June 1839 (partial: Chamber E and Senate A)
1840	25 May 1840 (partial)	—
1841	—	8 June 1841 (partial: Chamber A)
1842	23 May 1842 (partial)	—
1843	—	13 June 1843 (partial: Chamber E and Senate E)
1844	27 May 1844 (partial)	—
1845	—	10 June 1845 (partial: Chamber A)
1846	25 May 1846 (partial)	—
1847	—	8 June 1847 (partial: Chamber E and Senate A)
Equalisation of cens (tax as part of censitary suffrage) to the constitutional minimum by law of 12 March 1848.
1848	12 juli 1848 (full)	13 June 1848 (full: both chambers)
1850	27 May 1850 (partial)	11 June 1850 (partial: Chamber A)
1851	—	27 September 1851 (full: Senate)
1852	24 May 1852 (partial)	8 June 1852 (partial: Chamber E)
1854	22 May 1854 (partial)	13 June 1854 (partial: Chamber A)
1855	—	12 June 1855 (partial: Senate E)
1856	26 May 1856 (partial)	10 June 1856 (partial: Chamber E)
1857	—	10 December 1857 (full: Chamber)
1858	24 May 1858 (partial)	—
1859	—	14 June 1859 (partial: Chamber A and Senate A)
1860	28 May 1860 (partial)	—
1861	—	11 June 1861 (partial: Chamber E)
1862	26 May 1862 (partial)	—
1863	—	9 June 1863 (partial: Chamber A and Senate E)
1864	23 May 1864 (partial)	11 August 1864 (full: Chamber)
1866	28 May 1866 (partial)	12 June 1866 (partial: Chamber E)
1867	—	11 June 1867 (partial: Senate A)
1868	25 May 1868 (partial)	9 June 1868 (partial: Chamber A)
1870	23 May 1870 (partial)	14 June 1870 (partial: Chamber E); 2 August 1870 (full: both chambers)
1872	27 May 1872 (full)	11 June 1872 (partial: Chamber A)
1874	25 May 1874 (partial)	9 June 1874 (partial: Chamber E and Senate E)
1876	22 May 1876 (partial)	13 June 1876 (partial: Chamber A)
Increased regulation of election proceedings, including voting booths and guarantees for secret ballots, by law of 9 July 1877.
1878	27 May 1878 (partial)	11 June 1878 (partial: Chamber E and Senate A)
1880	24 May 1880 (partial)	8 June 1880 (partial: Chamber A)
1882	22 May 1882 (partial)	13 June 1882 (partial: Chamber E and Senate E)
1884	25 May 1884 (partial)	10 June 1884 (partial: Chamber A) and 8 July 1884 (full: Senate)
1886	23 May 1886 (partial)	8 June 1886 (partial: Chamber E)
1888	27 May 1888 (partial)	12 June 1888 (partial: Chamber A and Senate A)
1890	25 May 1890 (partial)	10 June 1890 (partial: Chamber E)
1892	22 May 1892 (partial)	14 June 1892 (full: both chambers)
Constitutional reforms of 1893 and Electoral Code of 12 April 1894: Universal plural suffrage for men above 25 years of age; Introduction of compulsory voting; Elections are now always held on Sundays instead of Tuesdays; Provincial senators introduced
1894	28 October 1894 (full)	14 October 1894 (full: both chambers)
1896	26 July 1896 (partial)	5 July 1896 (partial: Chamber A)
Provincial Elections Law of 22 April 1898: Term of provincial councils doubled to eight years instead of four, with partial elections each four years instead of each two years; By-elections for provincial councillors replaced by a system of substitutes
1898	5 June 1898 (partial)	22 May 1898 (partial: Chamber E and Senate E)
Legislative elections now use a proportional system with substitutes instead of a majority system with run-off and special elections
1900	3 June 1900 (partial)	27 May 1900 (full: both chambers)
1902	—	25 May 1902 (partial: Chamber A)
1904	5 June 1904 (partial)	29 May 1904 (partial: Chamber E and Senate A)
1906	—	27 May 1906 (partial: Chamber A)
1908	14 June 1908 (partial)	24 May 1908 (partial: Chamber E and Senate E)
1910	—	22 May 1910 (partial: Chamber A)
1912	9 June 1912 (partial)	2 June 1912 (full: both chambers)
1914	—	24 May 1914 (partial: Chamber E)

=== Elections in 1919–1994 ===
Year	Municipal elections	Provincial elections	Legislative elections	Other
Following World War I, major reforms were passed: A single vote per man instead of plural voting; Voting age was reduced from 25 to 21 years; A four-year full legislative term instead of partial renewal of the Chamber each two years; Introduction of co-opted senators
1919	—	—	16 November 1919	
1920	—	—		16 May 1920 (special Senate election)
Provincial Elections Law of 19 October 1921: A four-year full term for provincial councils instead of partial renewal; Proportional representation instead of a majority system
1921	24 April 1921	27 November 1921	20 November 1921	
1925	—	8 November 1925	5 April 1925	
1926	10 October 1926	—		
1929	—	9 June 1929	26 May 1929	
1932	9 October 1932	4 December 1932	27 November 1932	
1935	—	—		14 April 1935 (partial Chamber election in Brussels)
1936	—	7 June 1936	24 May 1936	
1937	—	—		11 April 1937 (partial Chamber election in Brussels)
1938	16 October 1938	—		
1939	—	—	2 April 1939 (snap)	
World War II
1946	24 November 1946	24 February 1946	17 February 1946	
Reforms: Equal voting rights for all women (by law of 27 March 1948); Provincial elections are now held simultaneously with parliamentary elections (by law of 15 May 1949)
1949	—	26 June 1949		
1950	—	4 June 1950 (snap)		12 March 1950 (referendum)
1952	12 October 1952	—		
1954	—	11 April 1954		
1958	12 October 1958	1 June 1958		
1961	—	26 March 1961 (snap)		
1964	11 October 1964	—		
1965	—	23 May 1965		
1968	—	31 March 1968 (snap)		
1970	11 October 1970	—		
1971	—	7 November 1971		21 November 1971 (Brussels Agglomeration Council)
1974	—	10 March 1974 (snap)		Including for the Council of the German cultural community
Large-scale merging of municipalities; their number was reduced from 2,663 to 589
1976	10 October 1976	—		
1977	—	17 April 1977 (snap)		Including for the Council of the German cultural community
1978	—	17 December 1978 (snap)		Including for the Council of the German cultural community
1979	—	—		10 June 1979 (European)
1982	10 October 1982	—		
1981	—	8 November 1981 (snap)		Including for the Council of the German cultural community
1984	—	—		17 June 1984 (European)
1985	—	13 October 1985		
1986	—	—		26 October 1986 (German-speaking Community)
1987	—	13 December 1987 (snap)		
1988	9 October 1988	—		
1989	—	—		18 June 1989 (European); 18 June 1989 (Brussels)
1990	—	—		28 October 1990 (German-speaking Community)
1991	—	24 November 1991		

== Federal state (1994–present) ==
The 1993–1994 fourth state reform had far-reaching consequences for the institutional structure of the country.

Local elections (six-year terms) include provincial and municipal elections, as well as district elections in Antwerp.

Regional elections (five-year terms, concurrently with European elections) are elections to the different parliaments of communities and regions: the Flemish Parliament, the Walloon Parliament, the Parliament of the Brussels-Capital Region, the Parliament of the German-speaking Community and indirectly the Parliament of the French Community and the three assemblies of the community commissions in Brussels.

Year	Local elections	Regional elections	Federal elections	European elections
1994	—	—	—	12 June 1994
1994	9 October 1994	—	—	—
1995	—	21 May 1995	21 May 1995	—
1999	—	13 June 1999	13 June 1999	13 June 1999
Districts in the city of Antwerp are established; their councils are now elected as well during local elections
2000	8 October 2000	—		
Federal constituencies changed from arrondissements to provinces; electoral threshold of 5% introduced
2003	—	—	18 May 2003	—
2004	—	13 June 2004	—	13 June 2004
Fifth state reform: Local elections are now organised by the three regional governments (other elections remain a matter for the federal government)
2006	8 October 2006	—		
2007	—	—	10 June 2007	—
2009	—	7 June 2009	—	7 June 2009
2010	—	—	13 June 2010 (snap)	—
2012	14 October 2012	—		
Sixth state reform: Direct elections to the Senate are abolished; federal elections are now only for the Chamber; Federal legislative term is increased from 4 to 5 years
2014	—	25 May 2014	25 May 2014	25 May 2014
2018	14 October 2018	—		
2019	—	26 May 2019	26 May 2019	26 May 2019
2024	13 October 2024	9 June 2024	9 June 2024	9 June 2024
2029	—	2029	2029	2029
2030	13 October 2030	—		

== See also ==
- Elections in Belgium
- State reform in Belgium
