= List of members of the National Congress of Belgium =

This is a list of members of the National Congress of Belgium. The National Congress was the constituent assembly of Belgium, sitting from 1830 to 1831. It had 200 members, elected on 3 November 1830 to represent modern Belgium, Luxembourg, and Limburg. When those elected died or resigned from the Congress, substitutes took their places, meaning that a total of 236 people sat in the Congress.

These people represented a range of political opinions. Orangists favoured reconciliation with the Netherlands, whilst Unionists favoured secession and union with France.

== List ==
| Name | Faction(s) | District |
|---|---|---|
| Lactance Allard | | Tournai |
| Joseph Andries | Catholic democrat | Ghent |
| Charles Annez de Zillebecke | Conservative Catholic | Sint-Niklaas |
| Jean Barbanson | Anti-clericalist | Brussels |
| Antoine Barthélémy | Anti-clericalist | Brussels |
| François Baugniet | | Nivelles |
| Louis Beaucarne | Catholic democrat | Oudenaarde |
| Nicolas Berger | Anti-clericalist | Arlon |
| Théodore Berthels (substitute) | | Nivelles |
| Félix Bethune | Moderate Catholic | Kortrijk |
| François Beyts | Anti-clericalist | Brussels |
| André Biver (substitute) | | Luxembourg |
| Charles Blargnies | Unionist with France sympathiser / Anti-clericalist | Mons |
| Pierre-Adrien Blomme | | Dendermonde |
| Jacques Bosmans | Conservative Catholic | Mechelen |
| Philippe-Joseph Boucqeau de Villeraie | Conservative Catholic | Mechelen |
| Jean-Baptiste Brabant | | Namur |
| Léopold Bredart | Anti-clericalist | Ath |
| Victor Buylaert | | Diksmuide |
| Joseph Buyse-Verscheure | Catholic democrat | Kortrijk |
| Hyacinthe Cartuyvels (substitute) | | Waremme |
| Emmanuel Cauvin | | Tournai |
| Jean-Baptiste Claes | Orangist | Antwerp |
| Pierre Claes | Moderate liberal | Leuven |
| Emmanuel Claus | Unionist with France | Mons |
| Albert Cogels | Orangist / Moderate Catholic | Antwerp |
| Henri Cogels | Orangist / Moderate Catholic | Antwerp |
| Jean-François Collet | Anti-clericalist | Verviers |
| Jean-Baptiste Cols (substitute) | | Nivelles |
| Charles Coppens | Anti-clericalist | Ghent |
| Louis Coppens | Anti-clericalist | Ghent |
| Charles Coppieters Stochove | Conservative Catholic | Bruges |
| Ferdinand Cornet de Grez | Orangist / Moderate liberal | Brussels |
| Philippe Corten | Catholic democrat | Leuven |
| Nicholas-Joseph Cruts (substitute) | | Maastricht |
| Pierre-Ernest Dams | Anti-clericalist | Grevenmacher |
| Jean-Baptiste d'Ansembourg | Orangist / Conservative Catholic | Maastricht |
| Philippe d'Arschot Schoonhoven | Moderate liberal | Brussels |
| Pierre David | Unionist with France / Anti-clericalist | Verviers |
| Gilles Davignon | | Verviers |
| Henri Dayeneux (substitute) | Unionist with France / Anti-clericalist | Marche-en-Famenne |
| Joseph de Baillet | Orangist / Conservative Catholic | Nivelles |
| Jean De Behr | Conservative Catholic | Liège |
| Charles de Bergeyck | Orangist / Moderate liberal | Sint-Niklaas |
| Gustave de Bocarme (substitute) | | Soignies |
| Philippe de Bousies (substitute) | | Mons |
| Charles de Bousies de Rouveroy | Anti-clericalist | Thuin |
| Charles de Brouckère | Anti-clericalist | Hasselt |
| Henri de Brouckère | Anti-clericalist | Roermond |
| Philippe de Celles | Moderate liberal | Brussels |
| François de Coninck | Conservative Catholic | Ypres |
| Feuillien de Coppin | Moderate liberal | Dinant |
| Joseph de Decker | Moderate Catholic | Dendermonde |
| Eugène Defacqz | Anti-clericalist | Ath |
| Leo de Foere | Catholic democrat | Bruges |
| Etienne Constantin de Gerlache | Orangist sympathiser / Conservative Catholic | Liège |
| Désiré de Haerne | Catholic democrat | Roeselare |
| Clément de Hemptinne | Orangist / Anti-clericalist | Nivelles |
| Gustave de Jonghe | Anti-clericalist | Ghent |
| Auguste de Jonghe d'Ardoye | Moderate liberal | Thuin |
| Justin de Labbeville | Unionist with France | Namur |
| François De Langhe | Anti-clericalist | Ypres |
| Jean Ghisbert de Leeuw | Catholic democrat | Huy |
| Josse Joseph de Lehaye | Unionist with France / Moderate liberal | Ghent |
| Auguste De Leuze | Conservative Catholic | Thuin |
| François d'Elhoungne (substitute) | | Leuven |
| Pierre de Liedel de Well | Orangist / Moderate liberal | Roermond |
| Louis Delwarde | Unionist with France / Anti-clericalist | Aalst |
| Edmond de Man | Anti-clericalist | Veurne |
| Antoine De Meer de Moorsel | Conservative Catholic | Aalst |
| Maximilien Demelin (substitute) | | Nivelles |
| Félix de Mérode | Moderate Catholic | Maastricht |
| Werner de Mérode | Conservative Catholic | Soignies |
| Felix de Muelenaere | Moderate liberal | Bruges |
| Jean de Neeff (substitute) | | Leuven |
| Pierre-Jean Denef | Catholic democrat | Turnhout |
| Jean-Marie de Pelichy van Huerne | Conservative Catholic | Bruges |
| Florimond De Quarre | Conservative Catholic | Namur |
| Clément de Renesse-Breidbach | Orangist / Moderate liberal | Maastricht |
| Alexandre de Robaulx | Anti-clericalist | Philippeville |
| François de Robiano | Conservative Catholic | Mechelen |
| Charles de Rodes | Conservative Catholic | Ghent |
| Charles de Roo | Moderate Catholic | Tielt |
| Edouard de Rouille | Conservative Catholic | Ath |
| Pierre de Ryckere | Orangist / Moderate liberal | Ghent |
| Etienne de Sauvage | | Liège |
| Louis de Schiervel | Moderate Catholic | Roermond |
| François de Sécus | Orangist sympathiser / Conservative Catholic | Mons |
| Frédéric de Sécus | Orangist sympathiser / Conservative Catholic | Ath |
| Louis de Sebille | Moderate liberal | Thuin |
| Michel-Laurent de Selys Longchamps | Anti-clericalist | Waremme |
| Pierre Desmanet de Biesme | Anti-clericalist | Namur |
| Camille de Smet | Anti-clericalist | Oudenaarde |
| Eugène de Smet | | Ghent |
| Joseph Jean De Smet | Catholic democrat | Ghent |
| Goswin de Stassart | Unionist with France sympathiser / Anti-clericalist | Namur |
| François de Stockhem-Méan | Orangist / Conservative Catholic | Liège |
| Charles Destouvelles | Orangist / Anti-clericalist | Maastricht |
| Pierre Destrivaux | Unionist with France sympathiser / Anti-clericalist | Liège |
| Louis Deswert (substitute) | | Leuven |
| Barthélémy de Theux de Meylandt | Conservative Catholic | Hasselt |
| Laurent De Thier | Unionist with France / Conservative Catholic | Verviers |
| Rutger de Tiecken de Terhove | Moderate Catholic | Maastricht |
| Georges de Trazegnies | Orangist | Charleroi |
| Paul Devaux | Moderate liberal | Bruges |
| Théophile De Ville | Conservative Catholic | Nivelles |
| Guillaume de Viron | Conservative Catholic | Brussels |
| Louis de Waha-Grisard (substitute) | | Liège |
| Henri de Wandre (substitute) | | Liège |
| Alphonse de Woelmont d'Opleeuw | Moderate liberal | Hasselt |
| Guillaume d'Hanens-Peers | Conservative Catholic | Sint-Niklaas |
| Antoine d'Hanis de Cannart | Orangist / Conservative Catholic | Antwerp |
| Edouard d'Huart | Moderate liberal | Virton |
| Jacques d'Martigny | Anti-clericalist | Grevenmacher |
| Jean-Baptiste d'Omalius-Thierry (substitute) | | Liège |
| François Domis | Orangist / Conservative Catholic | Mechelen |
| Alexandre d'Oreye | | Liège |
| Emile Oultremont (substitute) | | Liège |
| Pascsal Dreze | | Verviers |
| Ferdinand du Bois | Orangist / Conservative Catholic | Antwerp |
| François du Bus | Conservative Catholic | Tournai |
| Guillaume Dumont | Anti-clericalist | Charleroi |
| Dieudonné du Val de Beaulieu | Orangist sympathiser / Anti-clericalist | Mons |
| Théodore d'Yve de Bavay | Moderate liberal | Soignies |
| Isidore Fallon (substitute) | | Namur |
| Théophile Fallon | Anti-clericalist | Namur |
| Louis Fendius | Moderate liberal | Luxembourg |
| Joseph-Stanislas Fleussu | Anti-clericalist | Waremme |
| Joseph Forgeur | Unionist with France sympathiser / Anti-clericalist | Huy |
| Emmanuel François | Moderate liberal | Virton |
| Eugène Fransman | Unionist with France / Catholic democrat | Aalst |
| Jules Frison | Unionist with France / Anti-clericalist | Charleroi |
| Nicolas Gelders | Moderate liberal | Roermond |
| Alexandre Gendebien | Unionist with France sympathiser / Anti-clericalist | Mons |
| Jean-Baptiste Gendebien | Unionist with France sympathiser / Anti-clericalist | Charleroi |
| Jean-François Gendebien | Moderate liberal | Soignies |
| Louis Geudens | Moderate Catholic | Turnhout |
| Ferdinand Goethals-Bischoff | Moderate Catholic | Kortrijk |
| Jean Goethals | Catholic democrat | Kortrijk |
| Pacifique Goffint | Unionist with France / Anti-clericalist | Mons |
| Robert Helias d'Huddeghem | Conservative Catholic | Ghent |
| Jean-François Hennequin | Anti-clericalist | Maastricht |
| Ignace Henry | Anti-clericalist | Dinant |
| Philippe Huysman d'Annecroix | Orangist / Moderate liberal | Brussels |
| Louis Jacobs (substitute) | | Antwerp |
| Théodore Jacques | Anti-clericalist | Marche-en-Famenne |
| Joseph Jamine (substitute) | | Hasselt |
| Augustin Janssens | Moderate Catholic | Sint-Niklaas |
| Jean-Baptiste Joos | Moderate Catholic | Marche-en-Famenne |
| Lucien Jottrand | Orangist sympathiser / Anti-clericalist | Brussels |
| Jean-Baptiste Kockaert | Moderate Catholic | Brussels |
| François Lardinois | Unionist with France / Anti-clericalist | Verviers |
| Joseph Lebeau | Moderate liberal | Huy |
| Louis Le Bègue | Catholic democrat | Eeklo |
| Charles Le Bon | Catholic democrat | Turnhout |
| Mathieu Leclercq | Orangist sympathiser / Anti-clericalist | Liège |
| Charles Lecocq | Anti-clericalist | Tournai |
| Albert Lefebvre | Conservative Catholic | Brussels |
| Gérard Le Grelle | Orangist / Conservative Catholic | Antwerp |
| Charles Le Hon | Orangist sympathiser / Anti-clericalist | Tournai |
| François Lehon | Anti-clericalist | Tournai |
| François Lesaffre | Moderate Catholic | Kortrijk |
| Charles Liedts | Moderate liberal | Oudenaarde |
| Jean MacLagan | Orangist / Anti-clericalist | Ostend |
| Guillaume Marcq | | Brussels |
| Jean-Baptiste Marlet | Anti-clericalist | Neufchâteau |
| Hubert Masbourg | Conservative Catholic | Bastogne |
| Ferdinand Meeus | Moderate liberal | Brussels |
| Pierre Morel-Danheel | Moderate Catholic | Diksmuide |
| Léon Mulle | Moderate liberal | Ypres |
| Gérard Nagelmackers | Anti-clericalist | Liège |
| Gustave Nalinne | Anti-clericalist | Charleroi |
| Albert Nopener | Anti-clericalist | Nivelles |
| Jean-Baptiste Nothomb | Moderate liberal | Arlon |
| Théodore Olislagers de Sipernau | Orangist sympathiser / Conservative Catholic | Roermond |
| Léonard Ooms | Catholic democrat | Turnhout |
| Henri Orban-Rossius | Orangist | Liège |
| Jean Osy | Orangist / Moderate liberal | Antwerp |
| Antoine Peemans | Anti-clericalist | Leuven |
| Pierre-Egide Peeters | Moderate Catholic | Turnhout |
| Jean-Baptiste Pettens | Conservative Catholic | Leuven |
| Alexandre Picquet (substitute) | | Mons |
| Jean Pirmez | Unionist with France sympathiser / Anti-clericalist | Charleroi |
| François Pirson | Unionist with France / Anti-clericalist | Dinant |
| Jean-Baptiste Pollin | Moderate Catholic | Ypres |
| Joseph Raikem | Conservative Catholic | Liège |
| Alexander Rodenbach | Catholic democrat | Roeselare |
| Constantin Rodenbach | Catholic democrat | Roeselare |
| François Rodriguez d'Evora y Vega | Conservative Catholic | Soignies |
| Olivier Roels (substitute) | | Veurne |
| Jean-Baptiste Roeser | Anti-clericalist | Luxembourg |
| Charles Rogier | Moderate liberal | Liège |
| Léonard Rosseeuw | | Kortrijk |
| Nicolas Rouppe | Anti-clericalist | Brussels |
| Pierre-Guillaume Seron | Unionist with France / Anti-clericalist | Philippeville |
| Jean-Baptiste Serruys | Conservative Catholic | Ostend |
| Charles-Mathias Simons | Anti-clericalist | Diekirch |
| Ferdinand Speelman-Rooman | Moderate Catholic | Ghent |
| Félix Struye-Provoost | | Ypres |
| Erasme Louis Surlet de Chokier | Anti-clericalist | Hasselt |
| Charles Surmont de Volsberghe | Conservative Catholic | Ghent |
| Pierre-Gérard Teuwens | Conservative Catholic | Hasselt |
| Jean Thienpont | Conservative Catholic | Oudenaarde |
| Amand Thonus | | Marche-en-Famenne |
| Jean-Baptiste Thorn | Moderate liberal | Luxembourg |
| Pierre Trentesaux | Moderate liberal | Tournai |
| Constant van Crombrugghe | Conservative Catholic | Aalst |
| Jean-Baptiste van de Kerchove | Catholic democrat | Sint-Niklaas |
| François van den Broucke de Terbecq | Conservative Catholic | Dendermonde |
| Henri van den Hove | Moderate liberal | Leuven |
| Michel van der Belen | Moderate Catholic | Leuven |
| Pierre Vander Linden | Conservative Catholic | Leuven |
| Joseph van der Linden d'Hooghvorst | Conservative Catholic | Brussels |
| Liévin Van der Looy | Catholic democrat | Aalst |
| Sylvain Van de Weyer | Moderate liberal | Brussels |
| Leonard Van Dorpe | Catholic democrat | Kortrijk |
| Eugène van Hoobrouck de Mooreghem | Conservative Catholic | Oudenaarde |
| Henri van Innis | Moderate Catholic | Ghent |
| Pierre van Meenen | | Leuven |
| François Van Snick | Anti-clericalist | Ath |
| Joseph van Volden de Lombeke | Orangist / Conservative Catholic | Brussels |
| Pierre Verbeke | Catholic democrat | Kortrijk |
| Henri Vercruysse-Bruneel | Catholic democrat | Kortrijk |
| Désiré Verduyn | Catholic democrat | Sint-Niklaas |
| Jean Vergauwen-Goethals | Conservative Catholic | Ghent |
| Jean Verseyden de Varick | Conservative Catholic | Brussels |
| Pierre-Antoine Verwilghen | Catholic democrat | Sint-Niklaas |
| Charles Vilain XIIII | Catholic democrat | Maastricht |
| Charles Hippolyte Vilain XIIII | Moderate liberal | Dendermonde |
| Philippe Vilain XIIII | Orangist sympathiser | Sint-Niklaas |
| Jacques Wallaert | Moderate Catholic | Tielt |
| Nicolas Watlet | Anti-clericalist | Diekirch |
| Joseph Werbrouck-Pieters | Orangist / Anti-clericalist | Antwerp |
| Paul Wyvekens | Anti-clericalist | Nivelles |
| Charles Zoude | Catholic democrat | Namur |
| Léopold Zoude | Anti-clericalist | Neufchâteau |
