= 1892 Belgian general election =

- 14 June 1892

All 152 seats in the Chamber of Representatives 77 seats needed for a majority
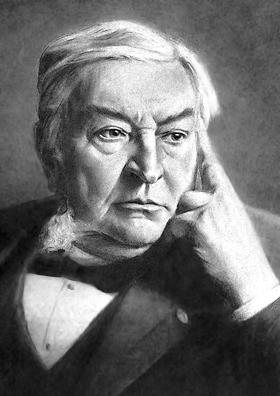

	First party	Second party
Leader	Auguste Beernaert
Party	Catholic	Liberal
Leader since	Candidate for PM
Seats before	94 seats	44 seats
Seats won	92	60
Seat change	▼2	▲16
Popular vote	56,199	47,518
Percentage	53.66%	45.37%
Government before election
Beernaert
Catholic
Government after election
Beernaert
Catholic

General elections were held in Belgium on Tuesday 14 June 1892, the first full general elections since 1870 and the last before the introduction of universal male suffrage prior to the 1894 elections. The result was a victory for the Catholic Party, which won 92 of the 152 seats in the Chamber of Representatives and 46 of the 76 seats in the Senate. Only 2.2% of the country's population were eligible to vote.

Run-off elections were held on Tuesday 21 June 1892 in the arrondissements of Mons, Tournai, Verviers, Nivelles and Charleroi as no candidate received a majority there.

== Results ==
=== Chamber of Representatives ===
Party	Votes	%	Seats	+/–
Catholic Party	56,199	53.66	92	–2
Liberal Party	47,518	45.37	60	+16
Belgian Labour Party	167	0.16	0	0
Others	844	0.81	0	0
Total	104,728	100.00	152	+14
Registered voters/turnout	136,707	–		
Source: Mackie & Rose, Sternberger et al.

=== Senate ===
Party	Seats	+/–
Catholic Party	46	–1
Liberal Party	30	+12
Total	76	+7

== Constituencies ==
The distribution of seats among the electoral districts was as follows for the Chamber of Representatives, with the difference compared to the previous election due to population growth:

Province	Arrondissement	Seats	Change
Antwerp	Antwerp	11	+3
Antwerp	Mechelen	4	+1
Antwerp	Turnhout	3	–
Limburg	Hasselt	3	+1
Limburg	Maaseik	1	–
Limburg	Tongeren	2	–
East Flanders	Aalst	4	–
East Flanders	Oudenaarde	3	–
East Flanders	Gent	9	+1
East Flanders	Eeklo	1	–
East Flanders	Dendermonde	3	–
East Flanders	Sint-Niklaas	4	+1
West Flanders	Bruges	3	–
West Flanders	Roeselare	2	–
West Flanders	Tielt	2	–
West Flanders	Kortrijk	4	–
West Flanders	Ypres	3	–
West Flanders	Veurne	1	–
West Flanders	Diksmuide	1	–
West Flanders	Ostend	2	+1
Brabant	Leuven	6	+1
Brabant	Brussels	18	+2
Brabant	Nivelles	4	–
Hainaut	Tournai	4	–
Hainaut	Ath	2	–
Hainaut	Charleroi	8	+1
Hainaut	Thuin	3	–
Hainaut	Mons	6	–
Hainaut	Soignies	3	–
Liège	Huy	2	–
Liège	Waremme	2	–
Liège	Liège	11	+2
Liège	Verviers	4	–
Luxembourg	Arlon	1	–
Luxembourg	Marche	1	–
Luxembourg	Bastogne	1	–
Luxembourg	Neufchâteau	1	–
Luxembourg	Virton	1	–
Namur	Namur	4	–
Namur	Dinant	2	–
Namur	Philippeville	2	–
		152	+14
