= 1830 Belgian general election =

Elections to the temporary National Congress were held in Belgium on 3 November 1830, following the declaration of independence from the Netherlands. The elections were held using a modified form of the Dutch system, as defined by the Orders of the Provisional Government of 10 October and 12 October 1830. 200 members were elected by plurality in constituencies of varying sizes, and suffrage was restricted to taxpaying men over the age of 25, with a higher tax threshold in urban areas than rural ones. Although clergy and academics were exempt from the restrictions, only around 1% of the country's population was eligible to vote.

== Electoral system ==
The order of 12 October 1830 distributed the 200 seats among the 44 administrative districts of the nine Belgian provinces. Along with these deputies, an equal number of substitutes were elected in each district.

Province	District	Deputies
Antwerp (18)	Antwerp	8
Antwerp (18)	Mechelen	5
Antwerp (18)	Turnhout	5
Limburg (17)	Hasselt	5
Limburg (17)	Maastricht	7
Limburg (17)	Roermond	5
East Flanders (35)	Aalst	6
East Flanders (35)	Oudenaarde	5
East Flanders (35)	Gent	12
East Flanders (35)	Eeklo	2
East Flanders (35)	Dendermonde	4
East Flanders (35)	Sint-Niklaas	6
West Flanders (28)	Bruges	5
West Flanders (28)	Roeselare	3
West Flanders (28)	Tielt	3
West Flanders (28)	Kortrijk	7
West Flanders (28)	Ypres	4
West Flanders (28)	Veurne	2
West Flanders (28)	Diksmuide	2
West Flanders (28)	Ostend	2
Brabant (27)	Leuven	7
Brabant (27)	Brussels	14
Brabant (27)	Nivelles	6
Hainaut (30)	Tournai	8
Hainaut (30)	Ath	4
Hainaut (30)	Charleroi	5
Hainaut (30)	Thuin	3
Hainaut (30)	Mons	6
Hainaut (30)	Soignies	4
Liège (19)	Huy	3
Liège (19)	Waremme	2
Liège (19)	Liège	9
Liège (19)	Verviers	5
Luxembourg (16)	Arlon	2
Luxembourg (16)	Luxembourg	3
Luxembourg (16)	Diekirch	2
Luxembourg (16)	Grevenmacher	2
Luxembourg (16)	Marche	2
Luxembourg (16)	Bastogne	1
Luxembourg (16)	Neufchâteau	2
Luxembourg (16)	Virton	2
Namur (10)	Namur	5
Namur (10)	Dinant	3
Namur (10)	Philippeville	2
Total		200

== Aftermath ==
The Constitution adopted in February 1831 instituted a bicameral parliament, the first elections for which were held a year later.

== See also ==
- List of members of the National Congress of Belgium
