= 1921 Belgian general election =

← 1919	20 November 1921	1925 →
- Chamber of Representatives
- All 186 seats in the Chamber of Representatives
Party	Leader	Vote %	Seats	+/–
Catholic	Georges Theunis	37.01	78	+8
Labour	Joseph Van Roosbroeck	34.81	68	−2
Liberal	Albert Mechelynck	17.80	33	−1
Catholic dissidents		3.35	2	−1
Frontpartij		3.04	4	−1
Combatants		1.07	1	−1
This lists parties that won seats. See the complete results below.
- Senate
- 93 of the 153 seats in the Senate
Party	Vote %	Seats	+/–
Labour	35.48	33	+13
Catholic	32.57	34	−9
Liberal	19.44	18	−12
United Catholics	4.99	5	New
CVP	2.79	2	New
Frontpartij	1.60	0	New
Christian Workers	0.89	1	New
This lists parties that won seats. See the complete results below.
Government before	Government after election
Carton de Wiart; National Unity (Catholic-Lab-Lib)	Theunis I Catholic-Liberal

General elections were held in Belgium on 20 November 1921. The Catholic Party, emerged as the largest party, winning 70 of the 186 seats in the Chamber of Representatives. Voter turnout was 91%.

Elections to the nine provincial councils were held one week later, on 27 November 1921.

A Catholic–Liberal government led by Georges Theunis was formed following the elections.

== Results ==
=== Chamber of Representatives ===
Party	Votes	%	Seats	+/–
Catholic Party	715,041	37.01	78	+8
Belgian Labour Party	672,445	34.81	68	–2
Liberal Party	343,929	17.80	33	–1
Catholic dissidents	64,746	3.35	2	–1
Frontpartij	58,790	3.04	4	–1
Combatants	20,633	1.07	1	–1
Christian Workers' Alliance	17,763	0.92	0	New
Middle Class Party	9,754	0.50	0	–1
Communist Party of Belgium	939	0.05	0	New
Other parties	27,802	1.44	0	–
Total	1,931,842	100.00	186	0
Valid votes	1,931,842	95.20		
Invalid/blank votes	97,326	4.80		
Total votes	2,029,168	100.00		
Registered voters/turnout	2,226,797	91.12		
Source: Mackie & Rose

=== Senate ===
A constitutional change eased the requirements to be a candidate for the Senate. As a compensation, the number of senators elected by provincial councils was increased from 27 to 40 and a new type of senators was introduced: 20 co-opted senators. This gives a total of 153 senators.

Party	Votes	%	Seats	+/–
Belgian Labour Party	661,168	35.48	33	+13
Catholic Party	606,799	32.57	34	–9
Liberal Party	362,187	19.44	18	–12
United Catholics Party	93,061	4.99	5	New
Christene Volkspartij	51,928	2.79	2	New
Frontpartij	29,726	1.60	0	New
Christian Workers' Alliance	16,588	0.89	1	New
Combatants	14,246	0.76	0	New
Democrats	6,907	0.37	0	New
Nationalist Cartel	5,196	0.28	0	New
Middle Class Party	4,401	0.24	0	0
Liberals	3,589	0.19	0	New
Liberal People's Union	3,506	0.19	0	New
National Party	2,427	0.13	0	New
Radical Party	1,603	0.09	0	New
Total	1,863,332	100.00	93	0
Source: Belgian Elections

== Constituencies ==
The distribution of seats among the electoral districts was as follows:

Province	Arrondissement(s)	Chamber	Senate
Antwerp	Antwerp	15	7
Antwerp	Mechelen	5	5
Antwerp	Turnhout	4	5
Antwerp	Elected by the provincial council		5
Limburg	Hasselt	3	4
Limburg	Tongeren-Maaseik	4	4
Limburg	Elected by the provincial council		3
East Flanders	Aalst	5	4
East Flanders	Oudenaarde	3	4
East Flanders	Gent-Eeklo	12	6
East Flanders	Dendermonde	4	4
East Flanders	Sint-Niklaas	4	4
East Flanders	Elected by the provincial council		5
West Flanders	Bruges	4	2
West Flanders	Roeselare-Tielt	5	3
West Flanders	Kortrijk	5	4
West Flanders	Ypres	3	4
West Flanders	Veurne-Diksmuide-Ostend	5	2
West Flanders	Elected by the provincial council		4
Brabant	Leuven	7	3
Brabant	Brussels	26	13
Brabant	Nivelles	4	2
Brabant	Elected by the provincial council		7
Hainaut	Tournai-Ath	6	3
Hainaut	Charleroi	11	7
Hainaut	Thuin	3	7
Hainaut	Mons	7	5
Hainaut	Soignies	4	5
Hainaut	Elected by the provincial council		6
Liège	Huy-Waremme	4	2
Liège	Liège	13	7
Liège	Verviers	5	2
Liège	Elected by the provincial council		4
Luxembourg	Arlon-Marche-Bastogne	3	3
Luxembourg	Neufchâteau-Virton	3	3
Luxembourg	Elected by the provincial council		3
Namur	Namur	5	5
Namur	Dinant-Philippeville	4	5
Namur	Elected by the provincial council		3
Total		186	93 + 40

Additionally, 20 senators were co-opted.
