= 1919 Belgian general election =

← 1914	16 November 1919	1921 →
- All 186 seats in the Chamber of Representatives; All 93 seats in the Senate
Party	Leader	Vote %	Seats
Chamber of Representatives
Labour	Joseph Van Roosbroeck	36.62	70
Catholic	Léon Delacroix	35.19	70
Liberal	François Prosper Hanrez	17.65	34
Frontpartij		3.45	5
Catholic dissidents		2.05	3
Middle Class		1.13	1
Combatants		1.08	2
National Renaissance		1.05	1
Senate
Catholic	Léon Delacroix	43.30	43
Liberal	François Prosper Hanrez	30.98	30
Labour	Joseph Van Roosbroeck	24.53	20
This lists parties that won seats. See the complete results below.
Government before	Government after election
Delacroix I National Unity (Catholic-Lab-Lib)	Delacroix II; National Unity (Catholic-Lab-Lib)

General elections were held in Belgium on 16 November 1919. Although the Belgian Labour Party received the most votes in the Chamber of Representatives elections, the Catholic Party remained the largest party in both the Chamber and the Senate. Voter turnout was 88.5% in the Chamber elections.

They were the first elections after the First World War, and the first with universal single-vote suffrage (for men), a change that was sought by and benefited the Belgian Labour Party. The voting age was also lowered from 25 to 21, and the system of proportional representation was modified to use apparentment (combining votes of different arrondissements within a province).

== Results ==
=== Chamber of Representatives ===
Party	Votes	%	Seats
Belgian Labour Party	645,124	36.62	70
Catholic Party	619,911	35.19	70
Liberal Party	310,876	17.65	34
Frontpartij	60,814	3.45	5
Catholic dissidents	36,063	2.05	3
Middle Class Party	19,939	1.13	1
Combatants	19,075	1.08	2
National Renaissance	18,546	1.05	1
Christene Volkspartij	5,825	0.33	0
Socialist dissidents	1,181	0.07	0
Other parties	24,446	1.39	0
Total	1,761,800	100.00	186
Valid votes	1,761,802	94.68	
Invalid/blank votes	99,088	5.32	
Total votes	1,860,890	100.00	
Registered voters/turnout	2,102,710	88.50	
Source: Nohlen & Stöver, Belgian Elections (Note: The number of valid votes is two higher than the number of votes cast for parties)

=== Senate ===
Party	Votes	%	Seats
Catholic Party	685,041	43.30	43
Liberal Party	490,046	30.98	30
Belgian Labour Party	388,011	24.53	20
Middle Class Party	10,601	0.67	0
National Union	5,245	0.33	0
National Renaissance	3,068	0.19	0
Total	1,582,012	100.00	93
Registered voters/turnout	2,102,710	–	
Source: Belgian Elections

== Constituencies ==
The distribution of seats among the electoral districts was as follows:

Province	Arrondissement(s)	Chamber	Senate
Antwerp	Antwerp	15	7
Antwerp	Mechelen	5	5
Antwerp	Turnhout	4	5
Antwerp	Elected by the provincial council		3
Limburg	Hasselt	3	4
Limburg	Tongeren-Maaseik	4	4
Limburg	Elected by the provincial council		2
East Flanders	Aalst	5	4
East Flanders	Oudenaarde	3	4
East Flanders	Gent-Eeklo	12	6
East Flanders	Dendermonde	4	4
East Flanders	Sint-Niklaas	4	4
East Flanders	Elected by the provincial council		4
West Flanders	Bruges	4	2
West Flanders	Roeselare-Tielt	5	3
West Flanders	Kortrijk	5	4
West Flanders	Ypres	3	4
West Flanders	Veurne-Diksmuide-Ostend	5	2
West Flanders	Elected by the provincial council		3
Brabant	Leuven	7	3
Brabant	Brussels	26	13
Brabant	Nivelles	4	2
Brabant	Elected by the provincial council		4
Hainaut	Tournai-Ath	6	3
Hainaut	Charleroi	11	7
Hainaut	Thuin	3	7
Hainaut	Mons	7	5
Hainaut	Soignies	4	5
Hainaut	Elected by the provincial council		4
Liège	Huy-Waremme	4	2
Liège	Liège	13	7
Liège	Verviers	5	2
Liège	Elected by the provincial council		3
Luxembourg	Arlon-Marche-Bastogne	3	3
Luxembourg	Neufchâteau-Virton	3	3
Luxembourg	Elected by the provincial council		2
Namur	Namur	5	5
Namur	Dinant-Philippeville	4	5
Namur	Elected by the provincial council		2
Total		186	93 + 27
