= 1890 Belgian general election =

- 10 June 1890

69 of the 138 seats in the Chamber of Representatives 70 seats needed for a majority
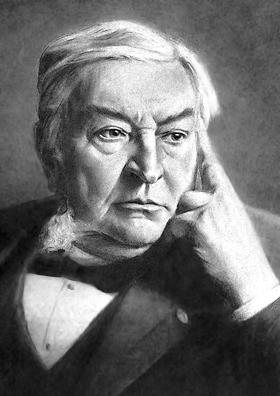

	First party	Second party
Leader	Auguste Beernaert
Party	Catholic	Liberal
Leader's seat	Candidate for PM
Seats before	98 seats	40 seats
Seats won	29	40
Seats after	94	44
Seat change	▼4	▲4
Popular vote	17,253	20,829
Percentage	45.15%	54.51%
Government before election
Beernaert
Catholic
Government after election
Beernaert
Catholic

Partial general elections were held in Belgium on 10 June 1890. In the elections for the Chamber of Representatives the result was a victory for the Catholic Party, which won 94 of the 138 seats.

Under the alternating system, elections were held in only four out of the nine provinces: Hainaut, Limburg, Liège and East Flanders. Thus, only 69 seats out of the 138 were up for election. Additionally, a special election was held in Neufchâteau on 3 June 1890.

== Results ==
=== Chamber of Representatives ===
Party	Votes	%	Seats		
Party	Votes	%	Won	Total	+/–
Liberal Party	20,829	54.51	40	44	+4
Catholic Party	17,253	45.15	29	94	–4
Belgian Labour Party	98	0.26	0	0	New
Others	30	0.08	0	0	0
Total	38,210	100.00	69	138	0
Total votes	38,210	–			
Registered voters/turnout	59,452	64.27			
Source: Mackie & Rose, Sternberger et al.

== Constituencies ==
The distribution of seats among the electoral districts was as follows:

Province	Arrondissement	Seats
Antwerp	Antwerp	8
Antwerp	Mechelen	3
Antwerp	Turnhout	3
Limburg	Hasselt	2
Limburg	Maaseik	1
Limburg	Tongeren	2
East Flanders	Aalst	4
East Flanders	Oudenaarde	3
East Flanders	Gent	8
East Flanders	Eeklo	1
East Flanders	Dendermonde	3
East Flanders	Sint-Niklaas	3
West Flanders	Bruges	3
West Flanders	Roeselare	2
West Flanders	Tielt	2
West Flanders	Kortrijk	4
West Flanders	Ypres	3
West Flanders	Veurne	1
West Flanders	Diksmuide	1
West Flanders	Ostend	1
Brabant	Leuven	5
Brabant	Brussels	16
Brabant	Nivelles	4
Hainaut	Tournai	4
Hainaut	Ath	2
Hainaut	Charleroi	7
Hainaut	Thuin	3
Hainaut	Mons	6
Hainaut	Soignies	3
Liège	Huy	2
Liège	Waremme	2
Liège	Liège	9
Liège	Verviers	4
Luxembourg	Arlon	1
Luxembourg	Marche	1
Luxembourg	Bastogne	1
Luxembourg	Neufchâteau	1
Luxembourg	Virton	1
Namur	Namur	4
Namur	Dinant	2
Namur	Philippeville	2
