= 1882 Belgian general election =

- 13 June 1882

69 of the 138 seats in the Chamber of Representatives 70 seats needed for a majority
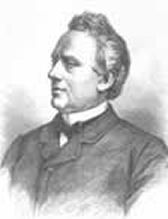

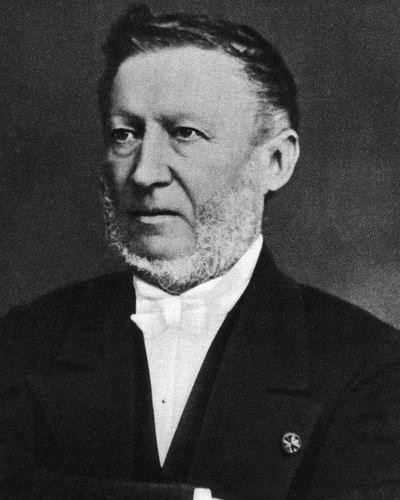
	First party	Second party
Leader	Walthère Frère-Orban	Jules Malou
Party	Liberal	Catholic
Leader since	Candidate for PM	Candidate for PM
Seats before	74 seats	58 seats
Seats won	49	20
Seats after	79	59
Seat change	▲5	▲1
Popular vote	22,001	19,681
Percentage	52.77%	47.21%
Government before election
Frère-Orban II
Liberal
Government after election
Frère-Orban II
Liberal

Partial general elections were held in Belgium on 13 June 1882. The result was a victory for the Liberal Party, which won 79 of the 138 seats in the Chamber of Representatives and 37 of the 69 seats in the Senate. Voter turnout was 75.1%, although only 55,517 people were eligible to vote.

Under the alternating system, elections for the Chamber of Representatives were only held in four out of the nine provinces: Hainaut, Limburg, Liège and East Flanders. Special elections were also held in the arrondissements of Antwerp, Philippeville, Brussels, Nivelles and Namur.

Run-off elections were held a week later, on 20 June 1882.

A special election was also held in Liège on 16 October 1882 following the death of Dieudonné Mouton on 17 September.

== Results ==
=== Chamber of Representatives ===
Party	Votes	%	Seats		
Party	Votes	%	Won	Total	+/–
Liberal Party	22,001	52.77	49	79	+5
Catholic Party	19,681	47.21	20	59	+1
Others	7	0.02	0	0	0
Total	41,689	100.00	69	138	+6
Total votes	41,689	–			
Registered voters/turnout	55,517	75.09			
Source: Mackie & Rose, Sternberger et al.

=== Senate ===
Party	Seats
Liberal Party	37
Catholic Party	32
Total	69
Source: Sternberger et al.

== Constituencies ==
The distribution of seats among the electoral districts was as follows for the Chamber of Representatives, with the difference compared to the previous election due to population growth:

Province	Arrondissement	Seats	Change
Antwerp	Antwerp	8	+1
Antwerp	Mechelen	3	–
Antwerp	Turnhout	3	–
Limburg	Hasselt	2	–
Limburg	Maaseik	1	–
Limburg	Tongeren	2	–
East Flanders	Aalst	4	+1
East Flanders	Oudenaarde	3	–
East Flanders	Gent	8	–
East Flanders	Eeklo	1	–
East Flanders	Dendermonde	3	–
East Flanders	Sint-Niklaas	3	–
West Flanders	Bruges	3	–
West Flanders	Roeselare	2	–
West Flanders	Tielt	2	–
West Flanders	Kortrijk	4	–
West Flanders	Ypres	3	–
West Flanders	Veurne	1	–
West Flanders	Diksmuide	1	–
West Flanders	Ostend	1	–
Brabant	Leuven	5	–
Brabant	Brussels	16	+2
Brabant	Nivelles	4	–
Hainaut	Tournai	4	–
Hainaut	Ath	2	–
Hainaut	Charleroi	7	–
Hainaut	Thuin	3	–
Hainaut	Mons	6	+1
Hainaut	Soignies	3	–
Liège	Huy	2	–
Liège	Waremme	2	–
Liège	Liège	9	+1
Liège	Verviers	4	–
Luxembourg	Arlon	1	–
Luxembourg	Marche	1	–
Luxembourg	Bastogne	1	–
Luxembourg	Neufchâteau	1	–
Luxembourg	Virton	1	–
Namur	Namur	4	–
Namur	Dinant	2	–
Namur	Philippeville	2	–
		138	+6
