= 1912 Belgian general election =

← 1910	2 June 1912	1914 →

All 186 seats in the Chamber of Representatives 93 of 120 seats in the Senate
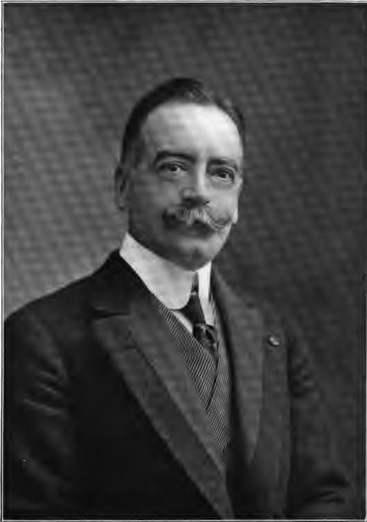

	First party	Second party	Third party
Leader	Charles de Broqueville	N/A
Party	Catholic	Liberal–Socialist	Liberal
Seats won	101	45	21
Popular vote	1,337,315	710,459	291,084
Percentage	51.01%	27.10%	11.10%
	Fourth party	Fifth party
Leader	Laurent Vandersmissen
Party	Labour	CVP
Seats won	18	1
Popular vote	243,338	19,317
Percentage	9.28%	0.74%
Government before election
De Broqueville I
Catholic
Government after election
De Broqueville I
Catholic

Full general elections were held in Belgium on 2 June 1912.

== Background ==
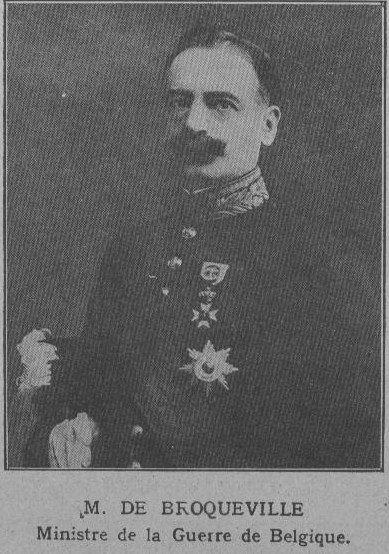
Charles de Broqueville

Catholics had formed the government continuously since 1884. Minister Schollaert had drafted a controversial education law, because of which he was forced to resign in June 1911. He was succeeded by a government led by Charles de Broqueville. The education law was intended to financially equalise public and private education, which was opposed by liberals and socialists as it benefited private (Catholic) schools. Both opposition parties, united against Catholics, were expected to win the elections. King Albert I was preparing to switch to a progressive government headed by liberal Paul Hymans. However, the elections unexpectedly increased the majority of the Catholic Party, which won 101 of the 186 seats in the Chamber of Representatives and 54 of the 93 seats in the Senate. Consequently, the incumbent Catholic government headed by Charles de Broqueville continued after the elections.

== Electoral system ==
These elections were the first full general elections since 27 May 1900, when a proportional system using the D'Hondt method was introduced. Since 1893, there was universal suffrage with plural voting. Hence, there were more votes than the 1,745,666 who could vote in these Chamber elections (out of a population of 7,571,387 in the country).

Following the population census, the number of seats in the Chamber of Representatives increased from 166 to 186. The number of directly elected seats in the Senate (half the number of Chamber seats) consequently increased from 83 to 93; the number of provincial senators remained at 27.

== Results ==
=== Chamber of Representatives ===
Party	Votes	%	Seats
Catholic Party	1,337,315	51.01	101
Liberal–Socialist kartels	710,459	27.10	45
Liberal Party	291,084	11.10	21
Belgian Labour Party	243,338	9.28	18
Christene Volkspartij	19,317	0.74	1
Independents	20,258	0.77	0
Total	2,621,771	100.00	186
Valid votes	2,621,771	97.68	
Invalid/blank votes	62,327	2.32	
Total votes	2,684,098	100.00	
Registered voters/turnout	2,814,089	95.38	
Source: Belgian Elections

=== Senate ===
Party	Votes	%	Seats
Catholic Party	1,224,767	52.22	54
Liberal–Socialist kartels	480,457	20.49	16
Liberal Party	408,043	17.40	14
Belgian Labour Party	223,197	9.52	9
Christene Volkspartij	8,937	0.38	0
Total	2,345,401	100.00	93
Valid votes	2,345,401	96.90	
Invalid/blank votes	75,136	3.10	
Total votes	2,420,537	100.00	
Registered voters/turnout	2,525,810	95.83	
Source: Belgian Elections

== Constituencies ==
The distribution of seats among the electoral districts was as follows. Several arrondissements got one or more additional seats, following the population census. With Neufchâteau-Virton receiving an extra seat, every electoral district now had at minimum, three seats in the Chamber.

Province	Arrondissement(s)	Chamber	Change	Senate	Change
Antwerp	Antwerp	15	+2	7	+1
Antwerp	Mechelen	5	+1	5	+1
Antwerp	Turnhout	4	+1	5	+1
Antwerp	Elected by the provincial council			3	–
Limburg	Hasselt	3	–	4	+1
Limburg	Tongeren-Maaseik	4	+1	4	+1
Limburg	Elected by the provincial council			2	–
East Flanders	Aalst	5	–	4	–
East Flanders	Oudenaarde	3	–	4	–
East Flanders	Gent-Eeklo	12	+1	6	+1
East Flanders	Dendermonde	4	+1	4	–
East Flanders	Sint-Niklaas	4	–	4	–
East Flanders	Elected by the provincial council			4	–
West Flanders	Bruges	4	–	2	–
West Flanders	Roeselare-Tielt	5	+1	3	+1
West Flanders	Kortrijk	5	–	4	–
West Flanders	Ypres	3	–	4	–
West Flanders	Veurne-Diksmuide-Ostend	5	+1	2	–
West Flanders	Elected by the provincial council			3	–
Brabant	Leuven	7	+1	3	–
Brabant	Brussels	26	+5	13	+2
Brabant	Nivelles	4	–	2	–
Brabant	Elected by the provincial council			4	–
Hainaut	Tournai-Ath	6	–	3	–
Hainaut	Charleroi	11	+2	7	+1
Hainaut	Thuin	3	–	7	+1
Hainaut	Mons	7	+1	5	–
Hainaut	Soignies	4	–	5	–
Hainaut	Elected by the provincial council			4	–
Liège	Huy-Waremme	4	–	2	–
Liège	Liège	13	+1	7	+1
Liège	Verviers	5	–	2	–
Liège	Elected by the provincial council			3	–
Luxembourg	Arlon-Marche-Bastogne	3	–	3	–
Luxembourg	Neufchâteau-Virton	3	+1	3	–
Luxembourg	Elected by the provincial council			2	–
Namur	Namur	5	–	5	+1
Namur	Dinant-Philippeville	4	–	5	+1
Namur	Elected by the provincial council			2	–
Total		186	+20	120	+10
