= 1878 Belgian general election =

- 11 June 1878

66 of the 132 seats in the Chamber of Representatives 67 seats needed for a majority
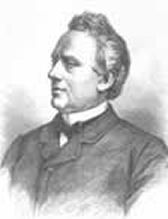

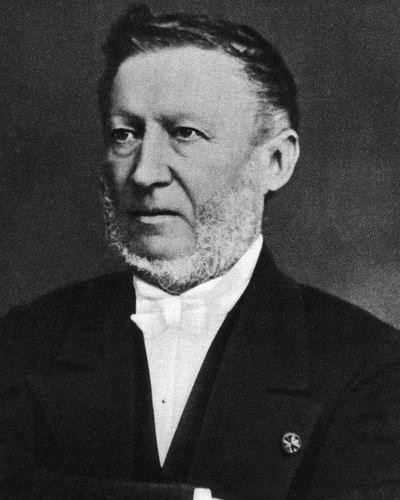
	First party	Second party
Leader	Walthère Frère-Orban	Jules Malou
Party	Liberal	Catholic
Leader since	Candidate for PM	Candidate for PM
Seats before	57 seats	67 seats
Seats won	48	18
Seats after	72	60
Seat change	▲15	▼7
Popular vote	21,283	20,700
Percentage	50.31%	48.94%
Government before election
Malou I
Catholic
Government after election
Frère-Orban II
Liberal

Partial general elections were held in Belgium on 11 June, 18 June and 15 July 1878. The result was a victory for the Liberal Party, which won 72 of the 132 seats in the Chamber of Representatives and 36 of the 66 seats in the Senate. Voter turnout was 62.5%, although only 56,640 people were eligible to vote.

Under the alternating system, elections for the Chamber of Representatives were only held in four out of the nine provinces: Hainaut, Limburg, Liège and East Flanders. Additionally, special elections were held in the arrondissements of Antwerp, Brussels and Kortrijk after these electoral districts got one extra seat due to population growth.

They were the first elections with strict guarantees for secret ballots following the law of 9 July 1877, which contributed to the success of the liberals.

== Results ==
=== Chamber of Representatives ===
Party	Votes	%	Seats		
Party	Votes	%	Won	Total	+/–
Liberal Party	18,966	52.61	48	72	+15
Catholic Party	17,085	47.39	18	60	–7
Total	36,051	100.00	66	132	+8
Total votes	36,051	–			
Registered voters/turnout	57,640	62.55			
Source: Mackie & Rose, Sternberger et al.

=== Senate ===
Party	Seats
Liberal Party	36
Catholic Party	30
Total	66
Source: Sternberger et al.

== Constituencies ==
The distribution of seats among the electoral districts was as follows for the Chamber of Representatives, with the difference compared to the previous election due to population growth:

Province	Arrondissement	Seats	Change
Antwerp	Antwerp	7	+1
Antwerp	Mechelen	3	–
Antwerp	Turnhout	3	–
Limburg	Hasselt	2	–
Limburg	Maaseik	1	–
Limburg	Tongeren	2	–
East Flanders	Aalst	3	–
East Flanders	Oudenaarde	3	–
East Flanders	Gent	8	+1
East Flanders	Eeklo	1	–
East Flanders	Dendermonde	3	–
East Flanders	Sint-Niklaas	3	–
West Flanders	Bruges	3	–
West Flanders	Roeselare	2	–
West Flanders	Tielt	2	–
West Flanders	Kortrijk	4	+1
West Flanders	Ypres	3	–
West Flanders	Veurne	1	–
West Flanders	Diksmuide	1	–
West Flanders	Ostend	1	–
Brabant	Leuven	5	–
Brabant	Brussels	14	+1
Brabant	Nivelles	4	–
Hainaut	Tournai	4	–
Hainaut	Ath	2	–
Hainaut	Charleroi	7	+2
Hainaut	Thuin	3	–
Hainaut	Mons	5	–
Hainaut	Soignies	3	–
Liège	Huy	2	–
Liège	Waremme	2	+1
Liège	Liège	8	–
Liège	Verviers	4	+1
Luxembourg	Arlon	1	–
Luxembourg	Marche	1	–
Luxembourg	Bastogne	1	–
Luxembourg	Neufchâteau	1	–
Luxembourg	Virton	1	–
Namur	Namur	4	–
Namur	Dinant	2	–
Namur	Philippeville	2	–
		132	+8
