= List of cities in Belgium =

This is a list of cities in Belgium. City status in Belgium is granted to a select group of municipalities by a royal order, decree, or by an act of law.

In 2026, the five largest cities or municipalities in Belgium in terms of population were Brussels, Antwerp, Ghent, Charleroi, and Liège.

A - B - C - D - E - F - G - H - I - J - K - L - M - N - O - P - Q - R - S - T - U - V - W - X - Y - Z

City	Arrondissement	Province	Population (1 January 2026)	Year of the royal order or decree	Communal Charter
Aalst (Alost)	Aalst	East Flanders	93,094	1825	1174
Aarschot (fr: Aerschot)	Leuven	Flemish Brabant	31,948	1825	1194
Andenne	Namur	Namur	28,239	1825	
Antoing	Tournai	Hainaut	7,602	1825	1817 (title)
Ans	Liège	Liège	29,268	2021	
Antwerp (nl, de: Antwerpen; fr: Anvers)	Antwerp	Antwerp	565,615	1825	1221
Arlon (nl: Aarlen; de: Arel)	Arlon	Luxembourg	31,440	1825	
Ath (nl: Aat)	Ath	Hainaut	30,235	1825	1166
Aubange	Arlon	Luxembourg	17,845	2018	
Bastogne (nl: Bastenaken)	Bastogne	Luxembourg	21,010	1825	1332
Beaumont	Thuin	Hainaut	7,104	1825	
Beauraing	Dinant	Namur	9,474	1985	
Beringen	Hasselt	Limburg	49,034	1985	1239
Bilzen-Hoeselt	Tongeren	Limburg	43,228	1985	1386
Binche	Thuin	Hainaut	33,841	1825	
Blankenberge	Bruges	West Flanders	20,741	1985	
Bouillon	Neufchâteau	Luxembourg	5,292	1825	
Braine-le-Comte (nl: 's-Gravenbrakel)	Soignies	Hainaut	23,761	1825	
Bree	Maaseik	Limburg	17,371	1985	1386
Bruges (nl: Brugge)	Bruges	West Flanders	120,458	1825	1128
Brussels (fr: Bruxelles; nl: Brussel; de: Brüssel)	Brussels-Capital		1,255,834 (Note: The population is indicated for Brussels-Capital Region, but the city status is granted to the City of Brussels (municipality).)	1825	1229
Charleroi	Charleroi	Hainaut	206,900	1825	
Châtelet	Charleroi	Hainaut	35,975	1825	
Chièvres	Bastogne	Hainaut	7,133	1825	
Chimay	Thuin	Hainaut	9,606	1825	
Chiny	Virton	Luxembourg	5,222	1825	
Ciney	Dinant	Namur	17,140	1985	
Comines-Warneton (nl: Komen-Waasten)	Mouscron	Hainaut	18,286	1825 (Warneton)	
Couvin	Philippeville	Namur	13,927	1985	
Damme	Bruges	West Flanders	11,321	1985	1180
Deinze	Ghent	East Flanders	46,380	1825	1241
Dendermonde (fr: Termonde)	Dendermonde	East Flanders	47,828	1825	1233
Diest	Leuven	Flemish Brabant	25,196	1825	1229
Diksmuide (Dixmude)	Diksmuide	West Flanders	17,386	1825	12th
Dilsen-Stokkem	Maaseik	Limburg	21,677	1987	1244 (Stokkem)
Dinant	Dinant	Namur	13,412	1825	
Durbuy	Marche-en-Famenne	Luxembourg	11,364	1825	1331
Eeklo	Eeklo	East Flanders	22,911	1825	1240
Enghien (nl: Edingen)	Soignies	Hainaut	14,702	1825	
Eupen	Verviers	Liège	20,145	1808	1808 (title)
Fleurus	Charleroi	Hainaut	23,037	1982	
Florenville	Virton	Luxembourg	5,681	1997	
Fontaine-l'Évêque	Charleroi	Hainaut	18,061	1825	
Fosses-la-Ville	Namur	Namur	10,513	1825	
Geel	Turnhout	Antwerp	42,650	1985	
Gembloux (nl: Gembloers)	Namur	Namur	26,573	1985	
Genappe (nl: Genepiën)	Nivelles	Walloon Brabant	16,299	1985	
Genk	Hasselt	Limburg	68,101	1999	
Geraardsbergen (fr: Grammont)	Aalst	East Flanders	35,338	1825	1068
Ghent (nl, de: Gent, fr: Gand)	Ghent	East Flanders	274,042	1825	1178
Gistel	Ostend	West Flanders	12,098	1985	13th
Halen	Hasselt	Limburg	9,584	1985	1206
Halle (fr: Hal)	Halle-Vilvoorde	Flemish Brabant	43,131	1825	1225
Hamont-Achel	Maaseik	Limburg	14,572	1985	14th century (Hamont)
Hannut (nl: Hannuit)	Waremme	Liège	17,295	1985	
Harelbeke	Kortrijk	West Flanders	30,605	1985	1153
Hasselt	Hasselt	Limburg	90,914	1825	1232
Herk-de-Stad (fr: Herck-la-Ville)	Hasselt	Limburg	13,004	1985	1386
Herentals	Turnhout	Antwerp	29,163	1985	1209
Herstal	Liège	Liège	40,909	2009	
Herve	Verviers	Liège	17,822	1825	
Hoogstraten	Turnhout	Antwerp	22,525	1985	1210
Houffalize	Bastogne	Luxembourg	5,385	1825	
Huy (nl: Hoei)	Huy	Liège	21,913	1825	1066
Izegem	Roeselare	West Flanders	29,444	1825	1817 (title)
Jodoigne (nl: Geldenaken)	Nivelles	Walloon Brabant	15,030	1985	
Kortrijk (fr: Courtrai)	Kortrijk	West Flanders	81,523	1825	1127
La Louvière	La Louvière	Hainaut	81,751	1985	
La Roche-en-Ardenne	Marche-en-Famenne	Luxembourg	4,055	1825	
Landen	Leuven	Flemish Brabant	16,458	1985	1211
Le Rœulx	Soignies	Hainaut	8,716	1825	
Lessines (nl: Lessen)	Soignies	Hainaut	18,901	1825	
Leuven (fr: Louvain, de: Löwen)	Leuven	Flemish Brabant	105,357	1825	1211
Leuze-en-Hainaut	Tournai	Hainaut	14,217	1825	
Libramont-Chevigny	Neufchâteau	Luxembourg	12,065	2025	
Liège (nl: Luik, de: Lüttich)	Liège	Liège	198,102	1825	
Lier (fr: Lierre)	Mechelen	Antwerp	38,747	1825	1212
Limbourg (nl, de: Limburg)	Verviers	Liège	5,669	1825	
Lokeren	Sint-Niklaas	East Flanders	50,897	1825	1804 (title)
Lommel	Maaseik	Limburg	35,451	1990	
Lo-Reninge	Diksmuide	West Flanders	3,138	1985	
Maaseik	Maaseik	Limburg	25,896	1825	1244
Malmedy (de: Malmünde)	Verviers	Liège	12,973	historical	
Marche-en-Famenne	Marche-en-Famenne	Luxembourg	18,007	1825	13th century
Mechelen (fr: Malines; de: Mecheln)	Mechelen	Antwerp	90,355	1825	1301
Menen (fr: Menin)	Kortrijk	West Flanders	34,640	1825	
Mesen (fr: Messines)	Ypres	West Flanders	1,068	1985	
Mons (nl, de: Bergen)	Mons	Hainaut	97,745	1825	
Mortsel	Antwerp	Antwerp	26,961	1999	
Mouscron (nl: Moeskroen)	Mouscron	Hainaut	60,410	1986	
Namur (nl: Namen)	Namur	Namur	115,457	1825	10th century
Neufchâteau	Neufchâteau	Luxembourg	8,388	1825	
Nieuwpoort (fr: Nieuport)	Veurne	West Flanders	11,431	1825	1163
Ninove	Aalst	East Flanders	40,879	1825	12th
Nivelles (nl: Nijvel)	Nivelles	Walloon Brabant	29,830	1825	13th century
Ostend (nl: Oostende; fr/de: Ostende)	Ostend	West Flanders	73,000	1825	1267
Ottignies-Louvain-la-Neuve	Nivelles	Walloon Brabant	31,823	1982	
Oudenaarde (fr: Audenarde)	Oudenaarde	East Flanders	33,105	1825	1189
Oudenburg	Ostend	West Flanders	10,449	1985	1226
Peer	Maaseik	Limburg	16,788	1985	
Péruwelz	Tournai	Hainaut	17,350	1825	
Philippeville	Philippeville	Namur	9,599	1825	
Poperinge	Ypres	West Flanders	19,890	1825	1147
Rochefort	Dinant	Namur	12,756	1985	
Roeselare (fr: Roulers)	Roeselare	West Flanders	67,697	1825	1250
Ronse (fr: Renaix)	Oudenaarde	East Flanders	27,731	1825	1240
Saint-Ghislain	Mons	Hainaut	23,969	1825	
Saint-Hubert	Neufchâteau	Luxembourg	5,741	1825	
Sambreville	Namur	Namur	28,587	2024	
St. Vith (fr: Saint Vith)	Verviers	Liège	10,191	historical	
Scherpenheuvel-Zichem (fr: Montaigu-Zichem)	Leuven	Flemish Brabant	24,537	1985	1605
Seraing	Liège	Liège	64,764	1999	
Sint-Niklaas (fr: Saint-Nicolas)	Sint-Niklaas	East Flanders	83,400	1825	
Sint-Truiden (fr: Saint-Trond)	Hasselt	Limburg	41,987	1825	8th
Soignies (nl: Zinnik)	Soignies	Hainaut	29,397	1825	1142
Spa	Verviers	Liège	9,923	2018	
Stavelot	Verviers	Liège	7,221	1825	
Thuin	Thuin	Hainaut	14,916	1825	
Tielt	Tielt	West Flanders	31,973	1825	1245
Tienen (fr: Tirlemont)	Leuven	Flemish Brabant	36,962	1825	
Tongeren-Borgloon (fr: Tongres-Looz)	Tongeren	Limburg	44,239	1825	
Torhout	Bruges	West Flanders	21,154	1825	
Tournai (nl: Doornik)	Tournai	Hainaut	69,066	1825	1188
Tubize (nl: Tubeke)	Nivelles	Walloon Brabant	29,043	2017	
Turnhout	Turnhout	Antwerp	48,490	1825	1212
Verviers	Verviers	Liège	56,182	1825	
Veurne (Furnes)	Veurne	West Flanders	12,749	1825	
Vilvoorde (fr: Vilvorde)	Halle-Vilvoorde	Flemish Brabant	48,413	1985	1192
Virton	Virton	Luxembourg	11,456	1825	
Visé (nl: Wezet)	Liège	Liège	18,097	1825	
Walcourt	Philippeville	Namur	18,338	1985	
Waregem	Kortrijk	West Flanders	40,737	1999	
Waremme (nl: Borgworm)	Waremme	Liège	15,427	1985	
Wavre (nl: Waver)	Nivelles	Walloon Brabant	35,735	1825	
Wervik (fr: Wervicq)	Ypres	West Flanders	19,234	1825	
Ypres (nl: Ieper)	Ypres	West Flanders	35,629	1825	1174
Zottegem (fr: Sottegem)	Aalst	East Flanders	28,343	1985	
Zoutleeuw (fr: Léau)	Leuven	Flemish Brabant	8,805	1985	1107

== See also ==
- City status in Belgium
- List of most populous municipalities in Belgium
- Municipalities of Belgium
- List of cities in Flanders
- List of cities in Wallonia
