= 1894 Belgian general election =

- 14 October 1894

All 152 seats in the Chamber of Representatives 77 seats needed for a majority
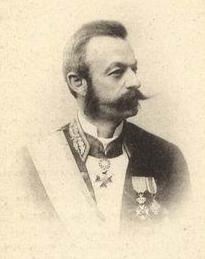

	First party	Second party
Leader	Jules de Burlet	Grégoire Serwy
Party	Catholic	Labour
Leader since	Candidate for PM	1893
Seats before	92 seats	0 seats
Seats won	102	27
Seat change	▲10	▲27
Popular vote	926,987	301,940
Percentage	56.38%	18.36%
	Third party	Fourth party
Leader		N/A
Party	Liberal	Liberal–Socialist
Leader since		N/A
Seats before	60 seats	New
Seats won	17	4
Seat change	▼43	New
Popular vote	515,808	32,914
Percentage	31.37%	2.00%
Government before election
de Burlet
Catholic
Government after election
de Burlet
Catholic

Full general elections were held in Belgium on 14 October 1894, with run-off elections held on 21 October 1894.

The elections followed several major reforms: they were the first held under universal male suffrage for those over the age of 25. This followed the abolition of tax qualifications, and increased the number of voters tenfold. Voting was also made compulsory. Provincial senators were introduced in addition to the existing directly elected ones.

The electoral reforms were implemented in 1893 under the Catholic government led by Auguste Beernaert, who had been in power for nearly ten years, but who resigned because his proposal for proportional representation was rejected. A government led by Jules de Burlet took over in March 1894.

The result was a victory for the Catholic Party, which won all seats in every Flemish arrondissement, in Brussels and in seven rural Walloon arrondissements, giving a total of 104 of the 152 seats in the Chamber of Representatives. The Belgian Labour Party gained parliamentary representation for the first time, winning all seats of Mons, Soignies, Charleroi, Verviers, 6 seats in Liège and one in Namur. Meanwhile, the Liberal Party, despite receiving more votes than the socialists, won only 20 seats and thus lost two-thirds of its seats. This was caused by the concentration of socialists in industrial Walloon areas, compared to the dispersed presence of liberal voters throughout the country. This highlighted the need for a proportional system, which would eventually be introduced in 1899.

== Results ==
=== Chamber of Representatives ===
Party	Votes	%	Seats	+/–
Catholic Party	926,987	50.05	102	+10
Liberal Party	515,808	27.85	17	–43
Belgian Labour Party	301,940	16.30	27	+27
Liberal–Socialist kartels	32,914	1.78	4	New
Christene Volkspartij	26,224	1.42	1	+1
Other parties	48,354	2.61	1	+1
Total	1,852,227	100.00	152	0
Valid votes	1,644,204	96.00		
Invalid/blank votes	68,463	4.00		
Total votes	1,712,667	100.00		
Registered voters/turnout	2,085,605	82.12		
Source: Belgian Elections

=== Senate ===
76 senators (half the number of representatives) were directly elected and 26 senators were chosen by the provincial councils, giving a total of 102 senators.

Party	Votes	%
Catholic Party	597,184	52.48
Liberal Party	495,288	43.53
Liberal Party–Socialist cartels	28,812	2.53
Belgian Labour Party	16,535	1.45
Total	1,137,819	100.00
Registered voters/turnout	1,148,433	–
Source: Nohlen & Stöver

== Constituencies ==
The distribution of seats among the electoral districts was as follows for the Chamber of Representatives and the Senate. There were no changes in districts and seat distribution compared to the previous election, except for the introduction of provincial senators.

Province	Arrondissement	Chamber	Won by	Senate	Won by
Antwerp	Antwerp	11	Catholics	5	Catholics
Antwerp	Mechelen	4	Catholics	2	Catholics
Antwerp	Turnhout	3	Catholics	2	Catholics
Antwerp	Elected by the provincial council			3	Catholics
Limburg	Hasselt	3	Catholics	1	Catholics
Limburg	Maaseik	1	Catholics	1	Catholics
Limburg	Tongeren	2	Catholics	1	Catholics
Limburg	Elected by the provincial council			2	Catholics
East Flanders	Aalst	4	Catholics	2	Catholics
East Flanders	Oudenaarde	3	Catholics	1	Catholics
East Flanders	Gent	9	Catholics	4	Catholics
East Flanders	Eeklo	1	Catholics	1	Catholics
East Flanders	Dendermonde	3	Catholics	2	Catholics
East Flanders	Sint-Niklaas	4	Catholics	2	Catholics
East Flanders	Elected by the provincial council			3	Catholics
West Flanders	Bruges	3	Catholics	2	Catholics
West Flanders	Roeselare	2	Catholics	1	Catholics
West Flanders	Tielt	2	Catholics	1	Catholics
West Flanders	Kortrijk	4	Catholics	2	Catholics
West Flanders	Ypres	3	Catholics	1	Catholics
West Flanders	Veurne	1	Catholics	1	Catholics
West Flanders	Diksmuide	1	Catholics	1	Catholics
West Flanders	Ostend	2	Catholics	1	Catholics
West Flanders	Elected by the provincial council			3	Catholics
Brabant	Leuven	6	Catholics	3	Catholics
Brabant	Brussels	18	Catholics	9	Catholics
Brabant	Nivelles	4	Liberals (3), Catholics (1)	2	Liberals
Brabant	Elected by the provincial council			4	Catholics
Hainaut	Tournai	4	Catholics	2	Catholics
Hainaut	Ath	2	Catholics	1	Catholics
Hainaut	Charleroi	8	Socialists	4	Liberals
Hainaut	Thuin	3	Liberals	1	Liberals
Hainaut	Mons	6	Socialists	3	Liberals
Hainaut	Soignies	3	Socialists	2	Liberals
Hainaut	Elected by the provincial council			4	Liberals (2), Socialists (2)
Liège	Huy	2	Liberals	1	Liberals
Liège	Waremme	2	Catholics	1	Liberals
Liège	Liège	11	Socialists (6), Liberals (5)	5	Liberals
Liège	Verviers	4	Socialists	2	Liberals (1), Catholics (1)
Liège	Elected by the provincial council			3	Liberals
Luxembourg	Arlon	1	Liberals	1	Liberals
Luxembourg	Virton	1	Liberals	1	Liberals
Luxembourg	Marche	1	Catholics	1	Catholics
Luxembourg	Bastogne	1	Catholics	1	Catholics
Luxembourg	Neufchâteau	1	Catholics	1	Catholics
Luxembourg	Elected by the provincial council			2	Catholics
Namur	Namur	4	Liberals (3), Socialists (1)	2	Liberals
Namur	Dinant	2	Catholics	1	Catholics
Namur	Philippeville	2	Liberals	1	Liberals
Namur	Elected by the provincial council			2	Catholics
		152		76+26	
