= 1936 Belgian general election =

| ← 1932 | 24 May 1936 | 1939 → |

All 202 seats in the Chamber of Representatives All 101 seats in the Senate
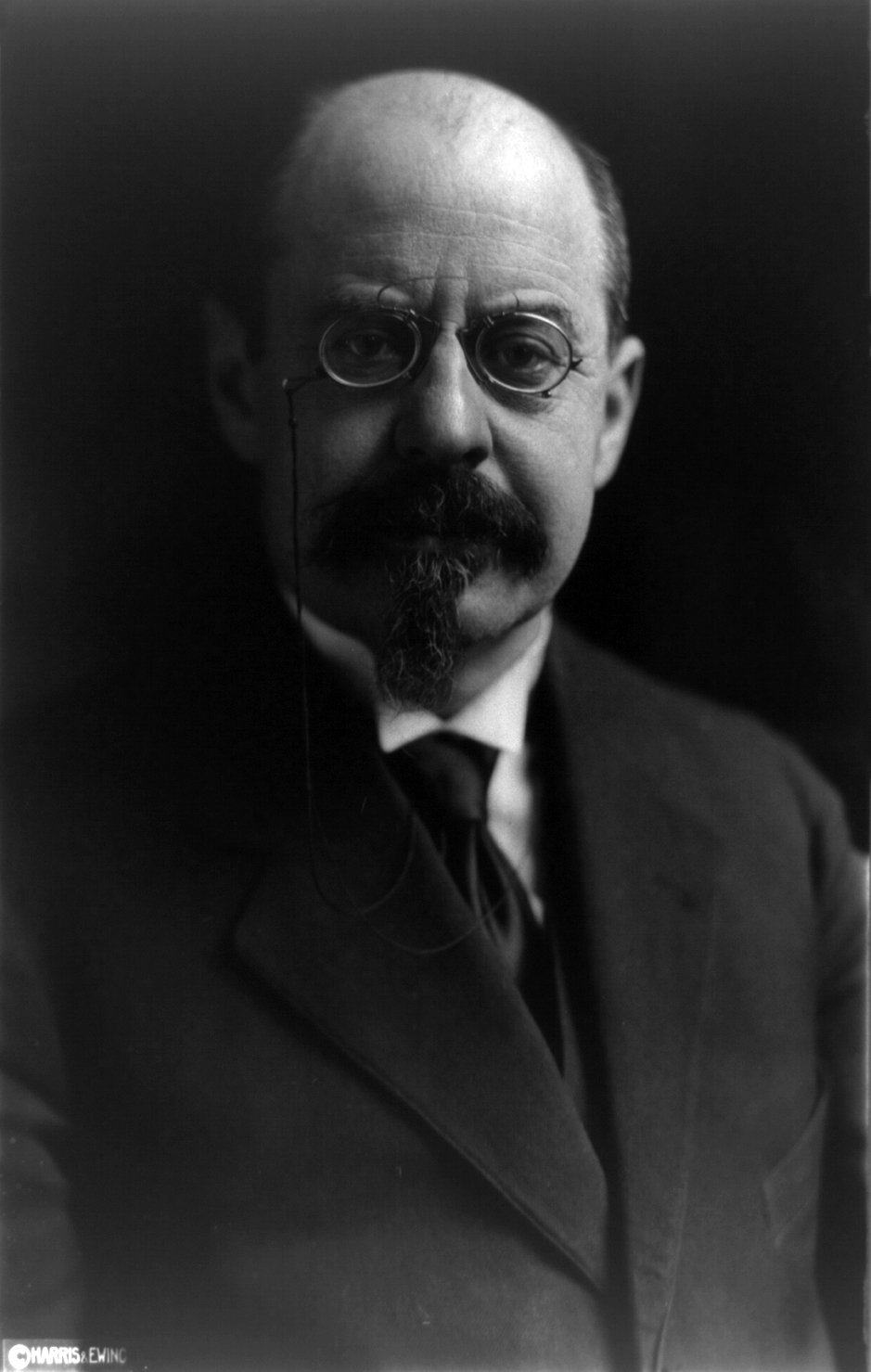

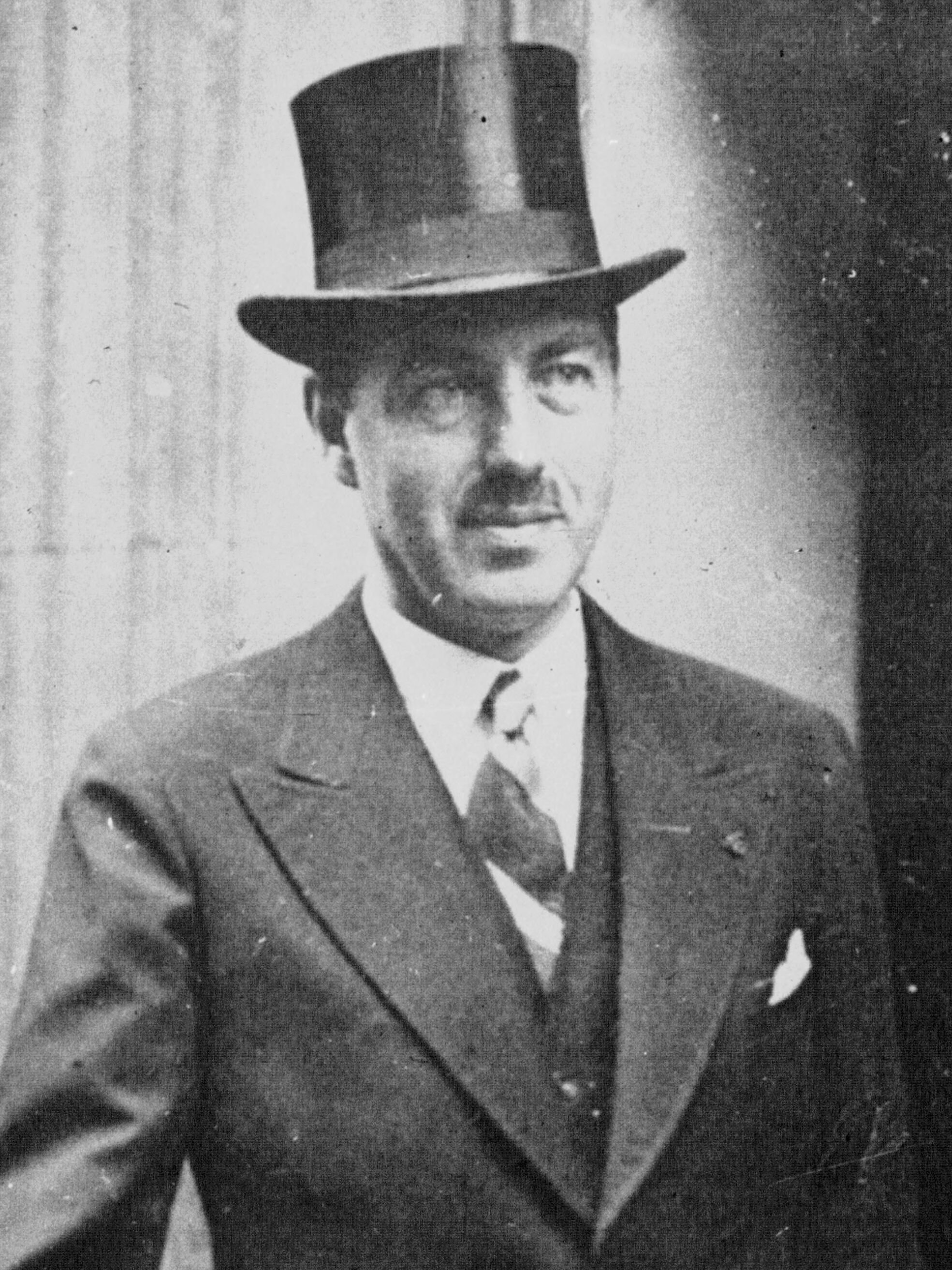

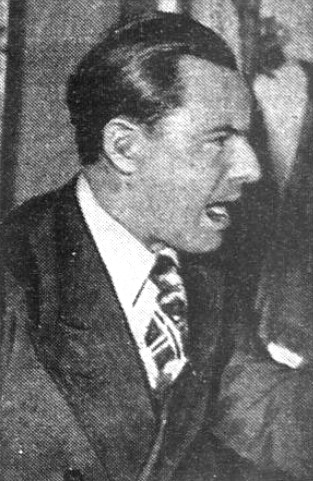

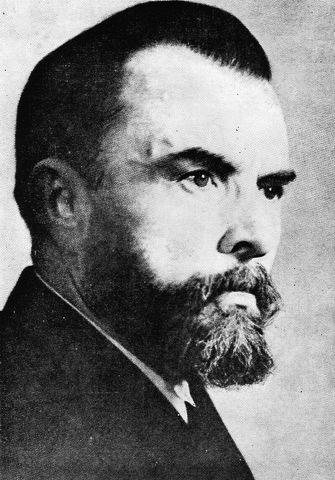

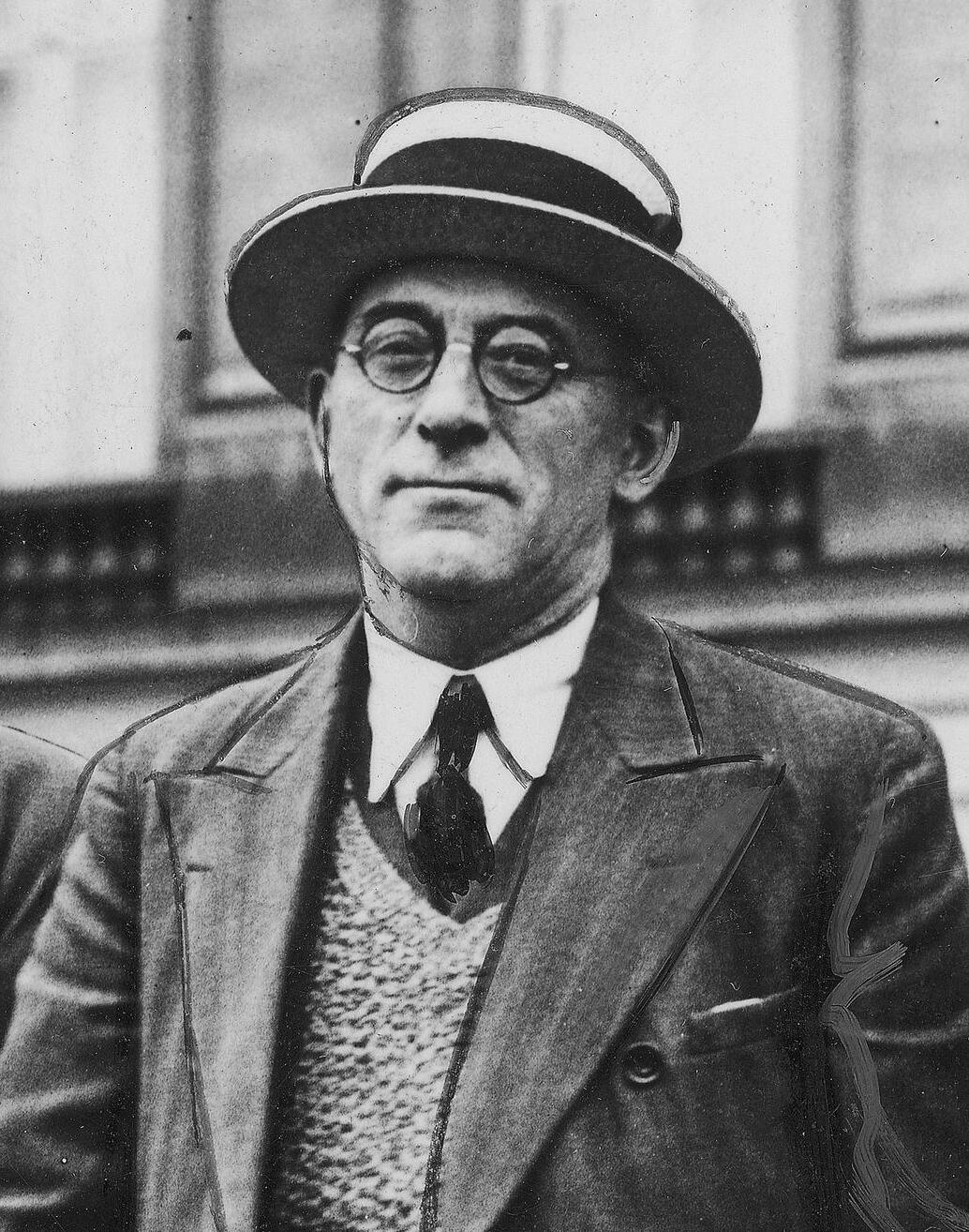
| | First party | Second party | Third party |
|---|---|---|---|
| Leader | Emile Vandervelde | Paul van Zeeland | Léon Dens |
| Party | Labour | Catholic | Liberal |
| Leader since | 1933 | Candidate for PM | 1935 |
| Last election | 73 seats, 37.03% | 79 seats, 38.42% | 24 seats, 14.08% |
| Seats won | 70 | 61 | 23 |
| Seat change | ▼3 | ▼18 | ▼1 |
| Popular vote | 758,485 | 653,717 | 292,970 |
| Percentage | 32.11% | 27.67% | 12.40% |
| Swing | ▼4.92% | ▼10.75% | ▼1.68% |
| | Fourth party | Fifth party | Sixth party |
| Leader | Léon Degrelle | Staf De Clercq | Joseph Jacquemotte |
| Party | Rexist | VNV | Communist |
| Leader since | 1935 | 1933 | 1934 |
| Last election | New | New | 3 seats, 2.90% |
| Seats won | 21 | 16 | 9 |
| Seat change | New | New | ▲6 |
| Popular vote | 271,481 | 164,253 | 143,223 |
| Percentage | 11.49% | 7.06% | 6.06% |
| Swing | New | New | ▲3.16% |
Government before election
van Zeeland I
National Unity (Catholic-Lab-Lib)
Government after election
van Zeeland II
National Unity (Catholic-Lab-Lib)

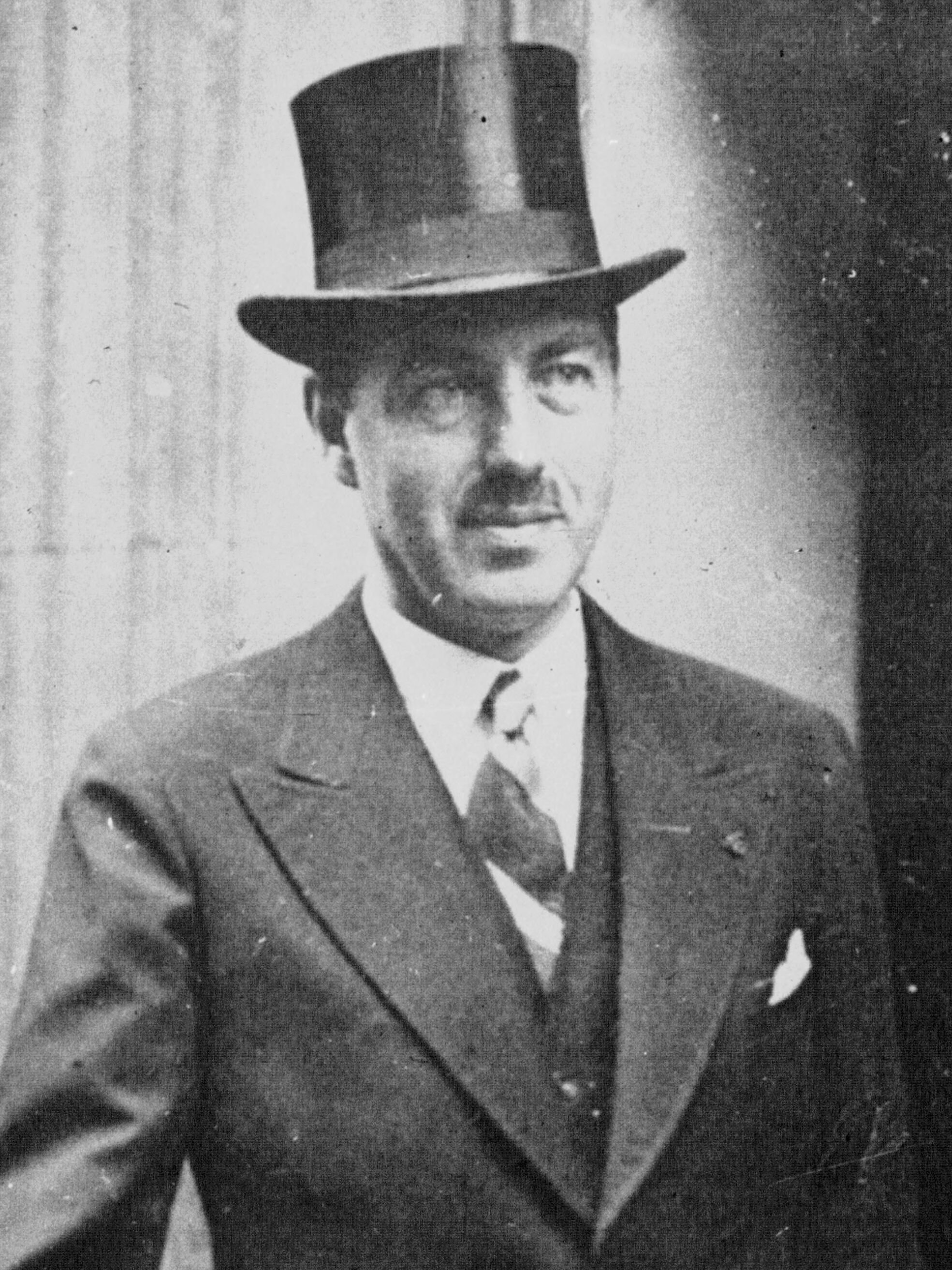
Prime Minister Paul van Zeeland

General elections were held in Belgium on 24 May 1936. The result was a victory for the Belgian Labour Party, which won 70 of the 202 seats in the Chamber of Representatives and 39 of the 101 seats in the Senate. Voter turnout was 94.7%.

Despite the rise of far-right and far-left parties, Paul van Zeeland continued as Prime Minister leading a government of national unity, composed of the three major parties (Catholics, Socialists and Liberals).

== Results ==
=== Chamber of Representatives ===
| Party | Votes | % | Seats | +/– |
|---|---|---|---|---|
| Belgian Labour Party | 758,485 | 32.11 | 70 | –3 |
| Catholic Party | 653,717 | 27.67 | 61 | –18 |
| Liberal Party | 292,970 | 12.40 | 23 | –1 |
| Rexist Party | 271,481 | 11.49 | 21 | New |
| Vlaamsch Nationaal Verbond | 166,737 | 7.06 | 16 | +8 |
| Communist Party of Belgium | 143,223 | 6.06 | 9 | +6 |
| Christian Democratic Party | 22,224 | 0.94 | 2 | New |
| Realists | 14,989 | 0.63 | 0 | New |
| People's Candidates | 7,997 | 0.34 | 0 | New |
| Socialist dissidents | 7,050 | 0.30 | 0 | 0 |
| Agrarians | 4,989 | 0.21 | 0 | New |
| Revolutionary Socialist Action | 2,082 | 0.09 | 0 | New |
| Independent National Party | 2,072 | 0.09 | 0 | New |
| Farmers | 1,995 | 0.08 | 0 | 0 |
| VNV dissidents | 1,618 | 0.07 | 0 | 0 |
| Clock | 1,518 | 0.06 | 0 | New |
| Isolated | 1,153 | 0.05 | 0 | 0 |
| Pigeon Fanciers | 918 | 0.04 | 0 | New |
| Taxpayers Bloc | 898 | 0.04 | 0 | 0 |
| Radical Party | 709 | 0.03 | 0 | 0 |
| Cooperative Bloc | 692 | 0.03 | 0 | New |
| Merchants | 391 | 0.02 | 0 | New |
| Producers | 225 | 0.01 | 0 | New |
| Quaedvlieg | 67 | 0.00 | 0 | New |
| Independents | 4,236 | 0.18 | 0 | New |
| Total | 2,362,436 | 100.00 | 202 | +15 |
| Valid votes | 2,362,436 | 94.07 | | |
| Invalid/blank votes | 148,810 | 5.93 | | |
| Total votes | 2,511,246 | 100.00 | | |
| Registered voters/turnout | 2,652,707 | 94.67 | | |
Source: Belgian Elections

=== Senate ===
| Party | Votes | % | Seats | +/– |
|---|---|---|---|---|
| Belgian Labour Party | 769,498 | 33.46 | 39 | 0 |
| Catholic Party | 667,739 | 29.04 | 34 | –8 |
| Liberal Party | 297,280 | 12.93 | 11 | 0 |
| Rexist Party | 250,272 | 10.88 | 8 | New |
| Vlaamsch Nationaal Verbond | 160,212 | 6.97 | 5 | +4 |
| Communist Party of Belgium | 110,855 | 4.82 | 4 | +4 |
| Christian Democratic Party | 19,477 | 0.85 | 0 | New |
| Other parties | 4,520 | 0.20 | 0 | – |
| Independents | 19,655 | 0.85 | 0 | New |
| Total | 2,299,508 | 100.00 | 101 | +8 |
| Valid votes | 2,299,508 | 91.67 | | |
| Invalid/blank votes | 209,055 | 8.33 | | |
| Total votes | 2,508,563 | 100.00 | | |
| Registered voters/turnout | 2,652,707 | 94.57 | | |
Source: Belgian Elections

== Constituencies ==
The distribution of seats among the electoral districts of the Chamber of Representatives was as follows. Several arrondissements got one or more additional seats. Roeselare-Tielt lost one seat, which was a rare occurrence since population generally increased throughout the Belgian territory with each census.

| Province | Arrondissement(s) | Seats | Change |
|---|---|---|---|
| Antwerp | Antwerp | 18 | +3 |
| Antwerp | Mechelen | 6 | +1 |
| Antwerp | Turnhout | 5 | +1 |
| Limburg | Hasselt | 4 | +1 |
| Limburg | Tongeren-Maaseik | 5 | +1 |
| East Flanders | Aalst | 6 | +1 |
| East Flanders | Oudenaarde | 3 | – |
| East Flanders | Gent-Eeklo | 12 | – |
| East Flanders | Dendermonde | 4 | – |
| East Flanders | Sint-Niklaas | 4 | – |
| West Flanders | Bruges | 4 | – |
| West Flanders | Roeselare-Tielt | 4 | –1 |
| West Flanders | Kortrijk | 6 | +1 |
| West Flanders | Ypres | 3 | – |
| West Flanders | Veurne-Diksmuide-Ostend | 5 | – |
| Brabant | Leuven | 7 | – |
| Brabant | Brussels | 30 | +4 |
| Brabant | Nivelles | 5 | +1 |
| Hainaut | Tournai-Ath | 6 | – |
| Hainaut | Charleroi | 11 | – |
| Hainaut | Thuin | 4 | +1 |
| Hainaut | Mons | 7 | – |
| Hainaut | Soignies | 3 | – |
| Liège | Huy-Waremme | 4 | – |
| Liège | Liège | 14 | +1 |
| Liège | Verviers | 5 | – |
| Luxembourg | Arlon-Marche-Bastogne | 3 | – |
| Luxembourg | Neufchâteau-Virton | 3 | – |
| Namur | Namur | 5 | – |
| Namur | Dinant-Philippeville | 4 | – |
| Total | | 202 | +15 |
