= 1852 Belgian general election =

← 1850	8 June 1852	1854 →

54 of the 108 seats in the Chamber of Representatives 55 seats needed for a majority
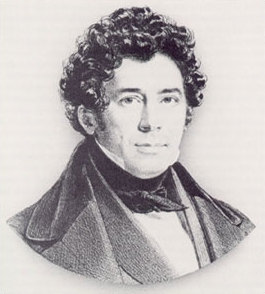

	First party	Second party
Leader	Charles Rogier
Party	Liberal	Catholic
Leader since	Candidate for PM
Seats before	69 seats	39 seats
Seats won	31	23
Seats after	57	51
Seat change	▼12	▲12
Popular vote	16,688	12,404
Percentage	57.36%	42.64%
Government before election
Rogier I
Liberal
Government after election
Rogier I
Liberal

Partial general elections were held in Belgium on 8 June 1852. In the elections for the Chamber of Representatives the result was a victory for the Liberal Party, who won 57 of the 108 seats. Voter turnout was 69.2%, although only 42,053 people were eligible to vote.

Under the alternating system, Chamber elections were only held in four out of the nine provinces: East Flanders, Hainaut, Liège and Limburg. Thus, 54 of the 108 Chamber seats were up for election.

== Results ==
=== Chamber of Representatives ===
Party	Votes	%	Seats		
Party	Votes	%	Won	Total	+/–
Liberal Party	16,688	57.36	31	57	–12
Catholics	12,404	42.64	23	51	+12
Total	29,092	100.00	54	108	0
Total votes	29,092	–			
Registered voters/turnout	42,053	69.18			
Source: Mackie & Rose, Sternberger et al.

== Constituencies ==
The division of seats among the electoral districts was as follows:

Province	Arrondissement	Seats
Antwerp	Antwerp	5
Antwerp	Mechelen	3
Antwerp	Turnhout	2
Limburg	Hasselt	2
Limburg	Maaseik	1
Limburg	Tongeren	2
East Flanders	Aalst	3
East Flanders	Oudenaarde	3
East Flanders	Gent	7
East Flanders	Eeklo	1
East Flanders	Dendermonde	3
East Flanders	Sint-Niklaas	3
West Flanders	Bruges	3
West Flanders	Roeselare	2
West Flanders	Tielt	2
West Flanders	Kortrijk	3
West Flanders	Ypres	3
West Flanders	Veurne	1
West Flanders	Diksmuide	1
West Flanders	Ostend	1
Brabant	Leuven	4
Brabant	Brussels	9
Brabant	Nivelles	4
Hainaut	Tournai	4
Hainaut	Ath	2
Hainaut	Charleroi	3
Hainaut	Thuin	2
Hainaut	Mons	4
Hainaut	Soignies	3
Liège	Huy	2
Liège	Waremme	1
Liège	Liège	5
Liège	Verviers	3
Luxembourg	Arlon	1
Luxembourg	Marche	1
Luxembourg	Bastogne	1
Luxembourg	Neufchâteau	1
Luxembourg	Virton	1
Namur	Namur	3
Namur	Dinant	2
Namur	Philippeville	1
