= 1839 Belgian general election =

← 1837	11 June 1839	1841 →

47 of the 98 seats in the Chamber of Representatives
Government before election
de Theux de Meylandt I
Catholic-Liberal
Government after election
de Theux de Meylandt I
Catholic-Liberal

Partial legislative elections were held in Belgium on 11 June 1839. In the Senate elections Catholics won 27 seats and Liberals 12. Voter turnout was 66.4%, although only 23,661 people were eligible to vote.

Under the alternating system, Chamber elections were only held in four out of the nine provinces: East Flanders, Hainaut, Liège and Limburg. Thus, 47 of the 98 Chamber seats were up for election. The total number of seats decreased from 102 to 98 following the split of Limburg (its districts were reduced from Hasselt, Maastricht and Roermond to Hasselt, Tongeren and Maaseik).

== Results ==
=== Senate ===
Party	Seats
Catholics	27
Liberals	12
Independents	8
Total	47
Source: Sternberger et al.
