= Dyle (department) =

Former French department (1795–1814)

Department of Dyle Département de la Dyle (French) Departement Dijle (Dutch)
- 1795–1814
- Location of Dyle in France (1812)
- Status: Department of the French First Republic and the French First Empire
- Chef-lieu: Bruxelles; 50°50′N 04°21′E
- Official languages: French
- Common languages: Dutch
- History
  - Creation: 1 October 1795
  - Treaty of Paris, disestablished: 30 May 1814

Population
  - 1784: 390,535
  - 1800: 363,661
  - 1806: 432,019
  - 1812: 431,969
Preceded by	Succeeded by
Duchy of Brabant	Province of Brabant
- Today part of: Belgium

Dyle (French: [dil], Dutch: Dijle) was a department of the French First Republic and French First Empire in present-day Belgium. It was named after the river Dyle (Dijle), which flows through the department. Its territory corresponded more or less with that of the Belgian province of Brabant, now divided into Walloon Brabant, Flemish Brabant and the Brussels-Capital Region. It was created on 1 October 1795, when the Austrian Netherlands and the Prince-Bishopric of Liège were officially annexed by the French Republic. Before the annexation, its territory was partly in the Duchy of Brabant, partly in the County of Hainaut, and partly in some smaller territories.

Dyle within the northern French Empire (1811)

Coat of arms of the city of Brussels under the French Empire

The Chef-lieu of the department was the City of Brussels (Bruxelles in French). The department was subdivided into the following three arrondissements and cantons (as of 1812):

- Bruxelles: Anderlecht, Asse, Bruxelles (4 cantons), Hal, La Hulpe, Lennik, Woluwe-Saint-Étienne, Uccle, Vilvorde and Wolvertem.
- Louvain: Aerschot, Diest, Glabbeek, Grez-Doiceau, Haecht, Léau, Louvain (2 cantons) and Tirlemont (2 cantons).
- Nivelles: Genappe, Hérinnes, Jodoigne, Nivelles (2 cantons), Perwez and Wavre.

After the defeat of Napoleon the department became part of the United Kingdom of the Netherlands, as the province of (South) Brabant.

== Administration ==
=== Prefects ===
The Prefect was the highest state representative in the department.

Term start	Term end	Office holder
2 March 1800	1 February 1805	Louis Gustave le Doulcet de Pontécoulant
1 February 1805	12 May 1808	François Louis René Mouchard de Chaban
12 May 1808	12 March 1813	Frédéric Séraphin de la Tour du Pin Gouvernet
12 March 1813	30 May 1814	Frédéric-Christophe d'Houdetot

=== General Secretaries ===
The General Secretary was the deputy to the Prefect.

Term start	Term end	Office holder
26 April 1800	?? ?? 1806	Joseph Claude Anne Le Gras de Bercagny
?? ?? 1806	30 May 1814	Jean Jacques Victor Verseyden de Varick

=== Subprefects of Bruxelles ===
The office of Subprefect of Bruxelles was held by the Prefect until 1811.

Term start	Term end	Office holder
14 January 1811	30 May 1814	Jean Pierre Henri Amédée Marbotin de Conteneuil

=== Subprefects of Louvain ===
Term start	Term end	Office holder
1 June 1800	17 May 1810	Duchastel
17 May 1810	30 May 1814	Sterckx

=== Subprefects of Nivelles ===
Term start	Term end	Office holder
25 April 1800	26 December 1811	Bauduin Joseph Ghislain Berlaimont
26 December 1811	30 May 1814	Martin de Bussy-Boulancy
