= Orangism (Belgium) =

Political movement in 19th-century Belgium

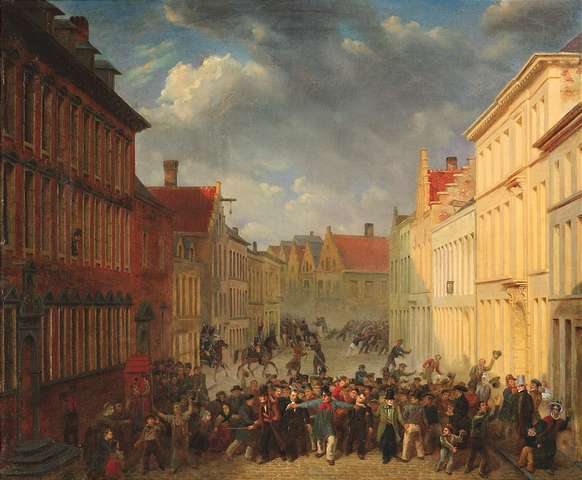
Arrest of the Orangist brothers C.J. and E.J. Geelhand della Faille in Antwerp on 21 May 1833 by the painter Jacob Verreyt

Orangism (Orangisme in French and Dutch) was a political tradition in Belgium that supported its reintegration into the short-lived United Kingdom of the Netherlands (1815–1830) under the rule of the Dutch House of Orange. It existed principally in the 1830s and 1840s.

After the secession of Belgium in the Belgian Revolution in 1830, Orangist sentiment in Flanders and Wallonia for a time sought a restoration of the United Kingdom of the Netherlands. It was a movement directed by William I of the Netherlands as part of his "Volhardingspolitiek" and containing most of the Belgian elites (including members of the nobility and industrialists) and particularly concentrated in Ghent and Liège. Some of the most prominent Flemish Orangists were Jan Frans Willems and Hippolyte Metdepenningen. Although refusing to participate in parliamentary elections, as they deemed Belgian national institutions to be illegitimate, the Orangists did take part in local elections at the provincial and municipal levels, from which they militated against the new Belgian state through political actions and an activist press. At least three Orangist coups were foiled during the 1830s. Although losing Dutch financial and political support after the Treaty of London (1839) and William I's abdication (1840), the weakening Belgian Orangism survived well into the 1850s, strongly opposing the Belgian Revolution and rallying against independence.

It was one inspiration for the later Greater Netherlands movement, although that movement was not all monarchist.

== Known Belgian Orangists ==
=== Present day ===
- Louis Tobback (Socialist politician)
- Siegfried Bracke (Flemish nationalist politician, former journalist)
- Herman Balthazar (Historian, professor, former governor of East Flanders)
- Geert van Istendael (Writer, poet, essayist)
- Bob Cools (Socialist politician, former mayor of Antwerp)

== See also ==
- Orangism (Luxembourg)
- Orange-Nassau (disambiguation)
