= 1867 Belgian general election =

Partial general elections were held in Belgium on 11 June 1867. In the Senate, where only seats in the provinces of Antwerp, Brabant, Luxembourg, Namur and West Flanders were up for election, the result was a victory for the Liberal Party, which won 33 of the 62 seats. Voter turnout was 52.0%, although only 55,506 people were eligible to vote. The Chamber was not up for election this year.

== Results ==
=== Senate ===
Party	Seats	
Party	Won	Total
Liberal Party	14	33
Catholics	18	29
Total	32	62
Source: Sternberger et al.
