= 1855 Belgian general election =

General elections were held in Belgium on 12 June 1855. In the Senate elections, Catholics won 31 seats and the Liberal Party won 23. Voter turnout was the lowest in Belgian history at just 35.0%, although only 42,907 people were eligible to vote. The Chamber was not up for election this year.

== Results ==
=== Senate ===
Party	Seats
Catholics	31
Liberal Party	23
Total	54
Source: Sternberger et al.
