= Arrondissement of Maastricht =

The Arrondissement of Maastricht was an arrondissement of the United Kingdom of the Netherlands until the Treaty of London in 1839. It was a part of the Province of Limburg, which also included the arrondissements of Hasselt and Roermond. It was centred on the city of Maastricht.

Unlike the surrounding countryside, which was, captured by Belgian rebels during the Belgian Revolution, the fortress of Maastricht remained loyal to the Dutch crown. As a result, the arrondissement was split between the Netherlands and Belgium, with the Belgian portion forming the rump of the new arrondissement of Tongeren (which also absorbed the canton of Borgloon from Hasselt).

In the National Congress of Belgium, Maastricht was represented by seven delegates, including Félix de Mérode, who served in the Provisional Government of Belgium.

An arrondissement of Maastricht had also existed as part of the department of Meuse-Inférieure in the French First Empire.
