= Arrondissement of Roermond =

The Arrondissement of Roermond was an arrondissement of the United Kingdom of the Netherlands until the Treaty of London in 1839. It was a part of the Province of Limburg, which also included the Hasselt and Maastricht. It was centred on the city of Roermond.

After the Belgian Revolution and the Treaty of London, the arrondissement was split between the Netherlands and Belgium. The Belgian portion formed the rump of the new arrondissement of Maaseik (which also absorbed the canton of Peer from Hasselt).

In the National Congress of Belgium, Roermond was represented by five delegates, including Henri de Brouckère, who would go on to be the Prime Minister of Belgium (1852–55).

An arrondissement of Roermond had also existed as part of the department of Meuse-Inférieure in the French First Empire.
