= Catholic Party (Belgium) =

Belgian political party (1869–1945)

Catholic Party French: Parti catholique Dutch: Katholieke Partij
- Historical leaders: Charles Woeste; Paul de Smet de Naeyer; Jules de Burlet; Auguste Beernaert; Gustave Sap
- Founded: 1869
- Dissolved: 1945
- Succeeded by: Christian Social Party
- Headquarters: Brussels
- Trade Union wing: Confederation of Christian Trade Unions
- Ideology: Belgian nationalism Christian democracy Conservatism; Clericalism
- Political position: Centre-right
- Religion: Roman Catholicism
- International affiliation: White International
- Colours: Gold

The Catholic Party (French: Parti catholique, pronounced [paʁti katɔlik]; Dutch: Katholieke Partij, pronounced [kɑtoːˈlikə pɑrˈtɛi]) was a Belgian political party established in 1869 as the Confessional Catholic Party (Dutch: Confessionele Katholieke Partij). In 1921, the party became the Catholic Union, and from 1936 the Catholic Block.

== History ==
In 1852, a Union Constitutionnelle et Conservatrice was founded in Ghent, in Leuven (1854), and in Antwerp and Brussels in 1858, which were active only during elections. On 11 July 1864 the Federation of Catholic Circles and Conservative Associations was created (French: Fédération des Cercles catholiques et des Associations conservatrices; Dutch: Verbond van Katholieke Kringen en der Conservatieve Verenigingen).

The other group which contributed to the party were the Catholic Cercles, of which the eldest had been founded in Bruges. The Malines Congresses in 1863, 1864, and 1867 brought together Ultramontanes or Confessionals and the Liberal-Catholics or Constitutionals. At the Congress of 1867, it was decided to create the League of Catholic Circles, which was founded on 22 October 1868.

The Catholic Party, under the leadership of Charles Woeste, gained an absolute majority in the Belgian Chamber of Representatives in 1884 from the Liberal Party in the wake of the schools dispute. The Catholic Party retained its absolute majority until 1918. In 1921, the party became the Catholic Union, and from 1936 the Catholic Block.

The party remained almost entirely inactive during the German occupation of Belgium during World War II and was officially disbanded on 5 February 1945. A successor party was founded on 18–19 August 1945 in the form of Christian Social Party (PSC-CVP).

== Notable members ==
- Auguste Beernaert, Nobel Peace Prize in 1909.
- Jules de Burlet
- Paul de Smet de Naeyer
- Jules Vandenpeereboom
- Jules de Trooz
- Gustaaf Sap
- Frans Schollaert
- Charles de Broqueville
- Gérard Cooreman
- Henri Baels

== See also ==
- Politics of Belgium
- Christene Volkspartij
- Rerum novarum
- Graves de communi re
- Het Volk
- Catholic Church in Belgium

== Electoral history ==
=== Chamber of Deputies ===
- 1936 Belgian general election: 61 seats, 27.67% of votes
- 1939 Belgian general election: 67 seats, 30.38% of votes

== Sources ==
- Gerard, Emmanuel (2001). "The Emergence of a People's Party: The Catholic Party in Belgium, 1918–1945". In Gehler, Michael (ed.). Christian Democracy in 20th Century Europe. Böhlau Verlag. pp. 98–121.
- Gerard, Emmanuel (2004). "Religion, Class and Language: The Catholic Party in Belgium". In Kaiser, Wolfram; Wohnout, Helmut (eds.). Political Catholicism in Europe 1918-45. Routledge. pp. 77–94. ISBN 0-7146-5650-X.
- Th. Luykx and M. Platel, Politieke geschiedenis van België, 2 vol., Kluwer, 1985
- E. Witte, J. Craeybeckx en A. Meynen, Politieke geschiedenis van België, Standaard, 1997
