= Arrondissement of Antwerp =

Administrative district in Antwerp Province, Belgium

Arrondissement of Antwerp Arrondissement Antwerpen
- Arrondissement
- Location of the arrondissement in Antwerp Province
- Coordinates: 51.25°N 4.5°E
- Country: Belgium
- Region: Flanders
- Province: Antwerp
- Municipalities: 28

Area
  - Total: 980.07 km^{2} (378.41 sq mi)

Population (1 January 2017)
  - Total: 1,039,943
  - Density: 1,061.1/km^{2} (2,748.2/sq mi)
- Time zone: UTC+1 (CET)
  - Summer (DST): UTC+2 (CEST)

The Arrondissement of Antwerp (Dutch: Arrondissement Antwerpen; French: Arrondissement d'Anvers) is one of the three administrative arrondissements in Antwerp Province, Belgium. It is both an administrative and a judicial arrondissement. The territory of the Judicial Arrondissement of Antwerp coincides with that of the Administrative Arrondissement of Antwerp.

== History ==
The Arrondissement of Antwerp was created in 1800 as the first arrondissement in the Department of Deux-Nèthes (Dutch: Departement Twee Nethen). It originally comprised the cantons of Antwerp, Boom, Berchem, Brecht, Ekeren and Zandhoven. In 1923, the then municipalities of Burcht and Zwijndrecht (Burcht was merged into Zwijndrecht in 1977 to form the municipality of Zwijndrecht) in the Arrondissement of Sint-Niklaas were added to the arrondissement. On January 1, 2025, Zwijndrecht became part of East Flanders again after merging with Beveren and Kruibeke into the municipality of Beveren-Kruibeke-Zwijndrecht.

== Municipalities ==
The Administrative Arrondissement of Antwerp consists of the following municipalities:

- Aartselaar
- Antwerp
- Boechout
- Boom
- Brasschaat
- Brecht
- Edegem
- Essen
- Hemiksem
- Hove
- Kalmthout
- Kapellen
- Kontich
- Lint
- Malle
- Mortsel
- Niel
- Ranst
- Rumst
- Schelle
- Schilde
- Schoten
- Stabroek
- Wijnegem
- Wommelgem
- Wuustwezel
- Zandhoven
- Zoersel
