= Arrondissement of Dendermonde =

Arrondissement in Flanders, Belgium

Arrondissement of Dendermonde Arrondissement Dendermonde
- Arrondissement
- Location of the arrondissement in East Flanders
- Coordinates: 51.05°N 4.05°E
- Country: Belgium
- Region: Flanders
- Province: East Flanders
- Municipalities: 10

Area
  - Total: 342.47 km^{2} (132.23 sq mi)

Population (1 January 2017)
  - Total: 199,553
  - Density: 582.69/km^{2} (1,509.2/sq mi)
- Time zone: UTC+1 (CET)
  - Summer (DST): UTC+2 (CEST)

The Arrondissement of Dendermonde (Dutch: Arrondissement Dendermonde; French: Arrondissement de Termonde) is one of the six administrative arrondissements in the Province of East Flanders, Belgium. It is both an administrative and a judicial arrondissement. However, the Judicial Arrondissement of Dendermonde also comprises the municipalities of the Arrondissements of Aalst (except the municipalities of Geraardsbergen, Herzele, Sint-Lievens-Houtem and Zottegem) and Sint-Niklaas.

== History ==
The Arrondissement of Dendermonde was created in 1800 as the third arrondissement in the Department of Escaut (Dutch: Departement Schelde). It originally comprised the cantons of Aalst, Beveren, Dendermonde, Hamme, Lokeren, Sint-Gillis-Waas, Sint-Niklaas, Temse, Wetteren and Zele. In 1814, the municipality of De Klinge in the Arrondissement of Eeklo was added to the arrondissement.

In 1818, the arrondissements of Aalst and Sint-Niklaas were created. On this occasion, the canton of Aalst was ceded to the arrondissement with the same name and the cantons of Beveren, Sint-Gillis-Waas, Sint-Niklaas and Temse were ceded from the arrondissement in order to form the Arrondissement of Sint-Niklaas. Parts of Laarne and Kalken were ceded to the Arrondissement of Ghent in 1921 in order to form the new municipality of Beervelde.

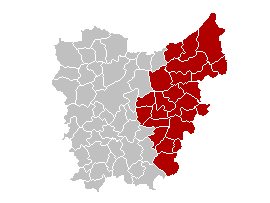
Judicial Arrondissement Dendermonde

== Municipalities ==
The Administrative Arrondissement of Dendermonde consists of the following municipalities:

- Berlare
- Buggenhout
- Dendermonde
- Hamme
- Laarne
- Lebbeke
- Waasmunster
- Wetteren
- Wichelen
- Zele
