= Arrondissement of Aalst =

Arrondissement in Flanders, Belgium

Arrondissement of Aalst Arrondissement Aalst
- Arrondissement
- Location of the arrondissement in East-Flanders
- Coordinates: 50.9°N 4.0°E
- Country: Belgium
- Region: Flanders
- Province: East Flanders
- Municipalities: 10

Area
  - Total: 468.92 km^{2} (181.05 sq mi)

Population (1 January 2017)
  - Total: 286,741
  - Density: 611.49/km^{2} (1,583.8/sq mi)
- Time zone: UTC+1 (CET)
  - Summer (DST): UTC+2 (CEST)

The Arrondissement of Aalst (Dutch: Arrondissement Aalst; French: Arrondissement d'Alost) is one of the six administrative arrondissements in the Province of East Flanders, Belgium. It forms the Judicial Arrondissement of Dendermonde together with the Arrondissements of Dendermonde and Sint-Niklaas.

== History ==
The Arrondissement of Aalst was created in 1818 by the merging of the canton of Aalst from the Arrondissement of Dendermonde with the cantons of Geraardsbergen, Herzele, Ninove and Zottegem from the Arrondissement of Oudenaarde. When the language border was determined in 1963, part of the then municipality of Twee Akren, in the Arrondissement of Soignies, was added to the arrondissement.

In 1977, the then-municipality of Sint-Maria-Oudenhove ceased to exist when merged with the municipalities of Zottegem and Brakel. As a result, the part of Sint-Maria-Oudenhove which was merged with Brakel was ceded to the Arrondissement of Oudenaarde.

== Municipalities ==
The Administrative Arrondissement of Aalst consists of the following municipalities:

- Aalst
- Denderleeuw
- Erpe-Mere
- Geraardsbergen
- Haaltert
- Herzele
- Lede
- Ninove
- Sint-Lievens-Houtem
- Zottegem
