= Arrondissement of Brussels =

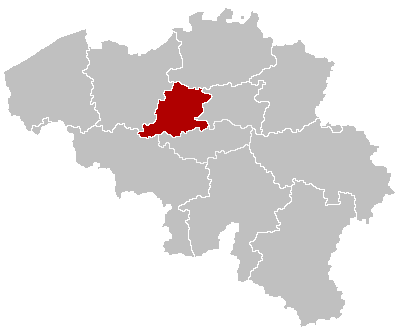
Arrondissement of Brussels

The arrondissement of Brussels was one of the three arrondissements forming the province of Brabant, Belgium, or before Belgium's independence forming the French Dyle department.

The arrondissement was split in 1963 upon the fixation of the language border into the arrondissement of Brussels-Capital, the arrondissement of Halle-Vilvoorde and the short-lived arrondissement of Brussels-Periphery that would later be merged into Halle-Vilvoorde. The arrondissement of Brussels was retained as electoral district, under the new name Brussels-Halle-Vilvoorde, which would later become a contentious issue in Belgian politics until being split in 2012–2014.

The arrondissement still exists as a judicial arrondissement, though its prosecution service was split as well in 2014.
