= Arrondissement of Verviers =

Arrondissement in Wallonia, Belgium

Arrondissement of Verviers Arrondissement de Verviers
- Arrondissement
- Location of the arrondissement in Liège
- Coordinates: 50.5°N 6.0°E
- Country: Belgium
- Region: Wallonia
- Province: Liège
- Municipalities: 29

Area
  - Total: 2,016.22 km^{2} (778.47 sq mi)

Population (1 January 2017)
  - Total: 286,723
  - Density: 142.208/km^{2} (368.318/sq mi)
- Time zone: UTC+1 (CET)
  - Summer (DST): UTC+2 (CEST)

The Arrondissement of Verviers (French: Arrondissement de Verviers; German: Verwaltungsbezirk Verviers; Dutch: Arrondissement Verviers) is one of the four administrative arrondissements in the Walloon province of Liège, Belgium. It includes all the 9 municipalities of the German-speaking Community (about 1/4 of population), while the remaining 20 municipalities in the Arrondissement of Verviers are part of the French-speaking Community.

The Administrative Arrondissement of Verviers consists of the following municipalities:

- Amel
- Aubel
- Baelen
- Büllingen
- Burg-Reuland
- Bütgenbach
- Dison
- Eupen
- Herve
- Jalhay
- Kelmis
- Lierneux
- Limbourg
- Lontzen
- Malmedy
- Olne
- Pepinster
- Plombières
- Raeren
- Sankt Vith
- Spa
- Stavelot
- Stoumont
- Theux
- Thimister-Clermont
- Trois-Ponts
- Verviers
- Waimes
- Welkenraedt
