= Arrondissement of Nivelles =

Arrondissement in Wallonia, Belgium

Arrondissement of Nivelles Arrondissement de Nivelles
- Arrondissement
- Location of the arrondissement in Walloon Brabant
- Coordinates: 50.67°N 4.58°E
- Country: Belgium
- Region: Wallonia
- Province: Walloon Brabant
- Municipalities: 27

Area
  - Total: 1,090.56 km^{2} (421.07 sq mi)

Population (1 January 2017)
  - Total: 399,123
  - Density: 365.980/km^{2} (947.883/sq mi)
- Time zone: UTC+1 (CET)
  - Summer (DST): UTC+2 (CEST)

The Arrondissement of Nivelles (French: Arrondissement de Nivelles; Dutch: Arrondissement Nijvel) is an arrondissement in Wallonia and Belgium. It is the only arrondissement in the province of Walloon Brabant, and is coterminous with it. Before 1995, it was one of three arrondissements in the Province of Brabant.

It is both an administrative and a judicial arrondissement, both having the same borders as the province.

== Municipalities ==
The Administrative Arrondissement of Nivelles consists of the following 27 municipalities:

- Beauvechain
- Braine-l'Alleud
- Braine-le-Château
- Chastre
- Chaumont-Gistoux
- Court-Saint-Étienne
- Genappe
- Grez-Doiceau
- Hélécine
- Incourt
- Ittre
- Jodoigne
- La Hulpe
- Lasne
- Mont-Saint-Guibert
- Nivelles
- Orp-Jauche
- Ottignies-Louvain-la-Neuve
- Perwez
- Ramillies
- Rebecq
- Rixensart
- Tubize
- Villers-la-Ville
- Walhain
- Waterloo
- Wavre

== See also ==
- Dyle (department)
