= Arrondissement of Sint-Niklaas =

Arrondissement in East Flanders

Arrondissement of Sint-Niklaas Arrondissement Sint-Niklaas
- Arrondissement
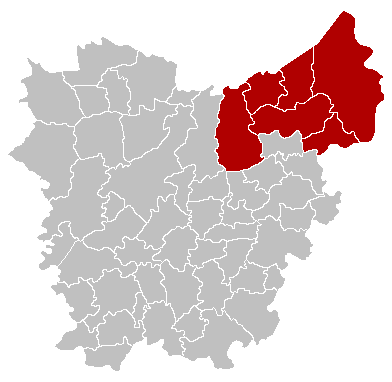
- Location of the arrondissement in East Flanders
- Coordinates: 51.2°N 4.15°E
- Country: Belgium
- Region: Flanders
- Province: East Flanders
- Municipalities: 6

Area
  - Total: 474.60 km^{2} (183.24 sq mi)

Population (1 January 2017)
  - Total: 248,489
  - Density: 523.58/km^{2} (1,356.1/sq mi)
- Time zone: UTC+1 (CET)
  - Summer (DST): UTC+2 (CEST)

The Arrondissement of Sint-Niklaas (Dutch: Arrondissement Sint-Niklaas; French: Arrondissement de Saint-Nicolas) is one of the six administrative arrondissements in the Province of East Flanders, Belgium.

The Administrative Arrondissement of Sint-Niklaas consists of the following municipalities:

- Beveren-Kruibeke-Zwijndrecht
- Lokeren
- Sint-Gillis-Waas
- Sint-Niklaas
- Stekene
- Temse
