= Leuven (Chamber of Representatives constituency) =

Former Belgian national legislative constituency

Leuven was a constituency used to elect members of the Belgian Chamber of Representatives between 1831 and 1999.

== Representatives ==
Election	Representative (Party)	Representative (Party)	Representative (Party)	Representative (Party)	Representative (Party)	Representative (Party)	Representative (Party)	Representative (Party)	Representative (Party)
1831	Antoine-François d'Elhoungne (Liberal)	Henri van den Hove (Catholic)	Michel Van der Belen (Catholic)	Werner de Merode (Catholic)	4 seats				
1833	Jean-Marie de Man d'Attenrode (Catholic)	Henri van den Hove (Catholic)	Michel Van der Belen (Catholic)	Werner de Merode (Catholic)	4 seats				
1837	Jean-Marie de Man d'Attenrode (Catholic)	Henri van den Hove (Catholic)	Michel Van der Belen (Catholic)	Gérard Buzen (Liberal)	4 seats				
1841	Jean-Marie de Man d'Attenrode (Catholic)	Jean-Baptiste Van den Eynde (Catholic)	Jules Joseph d'Anethan (Catholic)	Edmond de la Coste (Catholic)	4 seats				
1845	Jean-Marie de Man d'Attenrode (Catholic)	Jean-Baptiste Van den Eynde (Catholic)	Jules Joseph d'Anethan (Catholic)	Edmond de la Coste (Catholic)	4 seats				
1848	Jean-Marie de Man d'Attenrode (Catholic)	Léon de Wouters d'Oplinter (Catholic)	Louis Landeloos (Catholic)	Edmond de la Coste (Catholic)	4 seats				
1852	Jean-Marie de Man d'Attenrode (Catholic)	Léon de Wouters d'Oplinter (Catholic)	Louis Landeloos (Catholic)	Edmond de la Coste (Catholic)	4 seats				
1856	Jean-Marie de Man d'Attenrode (Catholic)	Léon de Wouters d'Oplinter (Catholic)	Louis Landeloos (Catholic)	Edmond de la Coste (Catholic)	4 seats				
1857	Jean-Marie de Man d'Attenrode (Catholic)	François Van Dormael (Catholic)	Louis Landeloos (Catholic)	Joseph-Adrien Beeckman (Catholic)	4 seats				
1861	Charles Delcour (Catholic)	François Schollaert (Catholic)	Louis Landeloos (Catholic)	Joseph-Adrien Beeckman (Catholic)	4 seats				
1864	Charles Delcour (Catholic)	François Schollaert (Catholic)	Louis Landeloos (Catholic)	Joseph-Adrien Beeckman (Catholic)	Edouard Wouters (Catholic)	5 seats			
1868	Charles Delcour (Catholic)	François Schollaert (Catholic)	Louis Landeloos (Catholic)	Joseph-Adrien Beeckman (Catholic)	Edouard Wouters (Catholic)	5 seats			
1870	Charles Delcour (Catholic)	François Schollaert (Catholic)	Théodore Smolders (Catholic)	Joseph-Adrien Beeckman (Catholic)	Edouard Wouters (Catholic)	5 seats			
1874	Charles Delcour (Catholic)	François Schollaert (Catholic)	Théodore Smolders (Catholic)	Joseph-Adrien Beeckman (Catholic)	Emile De Becker (Catholic)	5 seats			
1878	Charles Delcour (Catholic)	Alphonse de Becker (Catholic)	Théodore Smolders (Catholic)	Joseph-Adrien Beeckman (Catholic)	Louis Halflants (Catholic)	5 seats			
1882	Charles Delcour (Catholic)	Alphonse de Becker (Catholic)	Edouard De Néeff (Catholic)	Joseph-Adrien Beeckman (Catholic)	Louis Halflants (Catholic)	5 seats			
1886	Frans Schollaert (Catholic)	Jules de Trooz (Catholic)	Edouard De Néeff (Catholic)	Joseph-Adrien Beeckman (Catholic)	Louis Halflants (Catholic)	5 seats			
1890	Frans Schollaert (Catholic)	Jules de Trooz (Catholic)	Edouard De Néeff (Catholic)	Joseph-Adrien Beeckman (Catholic)	Léon Rosseeuw (Catholic)	5 seats			
1892	Frans Schollaert (Catholic)	Jules de Trooz (Catholic)	Edouard De Néeff (Catholic)	Joseph-Adrien Beeckman (Catholic)	Léon Rosseeuw (Catholic)	Albert Nyssens (Catholic)	6 seats		
1894	Frans Schollaert (Catholic)	Jules de Trooz (Catholic)	Edouard De Néeff (Catholic)	Joseph-Adrien Beeckman (Catholic)	Léon Rosseeuw (Catholic)	Albert Nyssens (Catholic)	6 seats		
1898	Frans Schollaert (Catholic)	Jules de Trooz (Catholic)	Edouard De Néeff (Catholic)	Joseph-Adrien Beeckman (Catholic)	Léon Rosseeuw (Catholic)	Albert Nyssens (Catholic)	6 seats		
1900	Frans Schollaert (Catholic)	Jules de Trooz (Catholic)	Auguste de Becker Remy (Catholic)	Prosper Van Langendonck (PS)	Léon Rosseeuw (Catholic)	Victor Beauduin (Liberal)	6 seats		
1904	Frans Schollaert (Catholic)	Prosper Poullet (Catholic)	Auguste de Becker Remy (Catholic)	Prosper Van Langendonck (PS)	Léon Rosseeuw (Catholic)	Raoul Claes (Liberal)	6 seats		
1908	Frans Schollaert (Catholic)	Prosper Poullet (Catholic)	Fernand de Wouters d'Oplinter (Catholic)	Louis Claes (PS)	Léon Rosseeuw (Catholic)	Raoul Claes (Liberal)	6 seats		
1912	Augustin Caluwaerts (Catholic)	Prosper Poullet (Catholic)	Fernand de Wouters d'Oplinter (Catholic)	Jean Triau (PS)	Léon Rosseeuw (Catholic)	Raoul Claes (Liberal)	Ignace Dony (Liberal)	7 seats	
1919	Victor Hessens (PS)	Prosper Poullet (Catholic)	Fernand de Wouters d'Oplinter (Catholic)	Edmond Doms (PS)	Oscar van den Eynde de Rivieren (Catholic)	Raoul Claes (Liberal)	Charles Dejaegher (Liberal)	7 seats	
1921	Victor Hessens (PS)	Prosper Poullet (Catholic)	Fernand de Wouters d'Oplinter (Catholic)	Edmond Doms (PS)	Oscar van den Eynde de Rivieren (Catholic)	Raoul Claes (Liberal)	Charles Dejaegher (Liberal)	7 seats	
1925	Victor Hessens (PS)	Prosper Poullet (Catholic)	Fernand de Wouters d'Oplinter (Catholic)	Edmond Doms (PS)	Oscar van den Eynde de Rivieren (Catholic)	Raoul Claes (Liberal)	Joseph Clynmans (Catholic)	7 seats	
1929	Victor Hessens (PS)	Prosper Poullet (Catholic)	Fernand de Wouters d'Oplinter (Catholic)	Edmond Doms (PS)	Oscar van den Eynde de Rivieren (Catholic)	Raoul Claes (Liberal)	Joseph Clynmans (Catholic)	7 seats	
1932	Auguste Smets (PS)	Prosper Poullet (Catholic)	Fernand de Wouters d'Oplinter (Catholic)	Edmond Doms (PS)	Albert de Vleeschauwer (Catholic)	Charles Dejaegher (Liberal)	Jules Sieben (Catholic)	7 seats	
1936	Auguste Smets (PS)	Antoine Léonard (Catholic)	Jan Vael (PS)	Alphonse Vranckx (BSP)	Albert de Vleeschauwer (Catholic)	Charles Dejaegher (Liberal)	Jules Sieben (Catholic)	7 seats	
1939	Auguste Smets (PS)	Gaston Eyskens (Catholic)	Paul Vandevelde (Liberal)	Alphonse Vranckx (BSP)	Albert de Vleeschauwer (Catholic)	Remi Emile Deneef (Liberal)	Jules Sieben (Catholic)	7 seats	
1946	Edmond Lievens (BSP)	Gaston Eyskens (Catholic)	Fernand Hermans (CVP)	François Tielemans (BSP)	Albert de Vleeschauwer (Catholic)	Paul Kronacker (Liberal)	Lucien Mellaerts (CVP)	7 seats	
1949	Jozef Feyaerts (BSP)	Gaston Eyskens (Catholic)	Fernand Hermans (CVP)	François Tielemans (BSP)	Albert de Vleeschauwer (Catholic)	Paul Kronacker (Liberal)	Lucien Mellaerts (CVP)	7 seats	
1950	Jozef Feyaerts (BSP)	Gaston Eyskens (Catholic)	Fernand Hermans (CVP)	François Tielemans (BSP)	Albert de Vleeschauwer (Catholic)	Paul Kronacker (Liberal)	Lucien Mellaerts (CVP)	7 seats	
1954	Jozef Feyaerts (BSP)	Gaston Eyskens (Catholic)	Fernand Hermans (CVP)	François Tielemans (BSP)	Albert de Vleeschauwer (Catholic)	Paul Kronacker (Liberal)	Maurice Schot (CVP)	7 seats	
1958	Jozef Feyaerts (BSP)	Gaston Eyskens (Catholic)	Fernand Hermans (CVP)	François Tielemans (BSP)	Albert de Vleeschauwer (Catholic)	Paul Kronacker (Liberal)	Maurice Schot (CVP)	7 seats	
1961	Jozef Feyaerts (BSP)	Gaston Eyskens (Catholic)	Fernand Hermans (CVP)	Jozef Grandjean (BSP)	Godelieve Devos (CVP)	Paul Kronacker (Liberal)	Stanislas De Rijck (CVP)	7 seats	
1965	Alfons Vranckx (BSP)	Georges Sprockeels (PVV)	Fernand Hermans (CVP)	Henri Boel (BSP)	Godelieve Devos (CVP)	Jaak Henckens (CVP)	Paul Devlies (CVP)	7 seats	
1968	Alfons Vranckx (BSP)	Georges Sprockeels (PVV)	Herman Verduyn (VU)	Henri Boel (BSP)	Godelieve Devos (CVP)	Jaak Henckens (CVP)	Paul Devlies (CVP)	Robert Rolin Jaequemyns (PVV)	8 seats
1971	Alfons Vranckx (BSP)	Georges Sprockeels (PVV)	Willy Kuijpers (VU)	Henri Boel (BSP)	Godelieve Devos (CVP)	Jaak Henckens (CVP)	August Smets (BSP)	Robert Rolin Jaequemyns (PVV)	8 seats
1974	Alfons Vranckx (BSP)	Georges Sprockeels (PVV)	Willy Kuijpers (VU)	Henri Boel (BSP)	Godelieve Devos (CVP)	Jaak Henckens (CVP)	Louis Tobback (BSP)	Robert Rolin Jaequemyns (PVV)	Jan Daems (PVV)
1977	Alfons Vranckx (BSP)	Georges Sprockeels (PVV)	Willy Kuijpers (VU)	Henri Boel (BSP)	Godelieve Devos (CVP)	Jaak Henckens (CVP)	Louis Tobback (BSP)	Mark Eyskens (CVP)	Jef Colin (BSP)
1978	Louis Pans (PVV)	Georges Sprockeels (PVV)	Willy Kuijpers (VU)	Henri Boel (BSP)	Godelieve Devos (CVP)	Jaak Henckens (CVP)	Louis Tobback (BSP)	Mark Eyskens (CVP)	Paul Devlies (CVP)
1981	Louis Pans (PVV)	Georges Sprockeels (PVV)	Luk Vanhorenbeek (VU)	August Bogaerts (PS)	Godelieve Devos (CVP)	Fernand Piot (CVP)	Louis Tobback (BSP)	Mark Eyskens (CVP)	Paul Devlies (CVP)
1985	Paul Vandermeulen (PVV)	Georges Sprockeels (PVV)	Luk Vanhorenbeek (VU)	Annie Duroi-Vanhelmont (PS)	Frank Vandenbroucke (PS)	Fernand Piot (CVP)	Louis Tobback (BSP)	Mark Eyskens (CVP)	Trees Merckx-Van Goey (CVP)
1988	Paul Vandermeulen (PVV)	Rik Daems (VLD)	Luk Vanhorenbeek (VU)	Annie Duroi-Vanhelmont (PS)	Frank Vandenbroucke (PS)	Jos Bosmans (CVP)	Louis Tobback (BSP)	Mark Eyskens (CVP)	Trees Merckx-Van Goey (CVP)
1991	Léon Pierco (PVV)	Rik Daems (VLD)	Hugo Marsoul (CVP)	André Schellens (PS)	Frank Vandenbroucke (PS)	Lodewijk Steenwegen (Agalev)	Marcel Logist (PS)	Mark Eyskens (CVP)	Trees Merckx-Van Goey (CVP)
1995	Paul De Grauwe (VLD)	Rik Daems (VLD)	An Hermans (CVP)	André Schellens (PS)	Miche Dejonghe (PS)	Tony Smets (VLD)	7 seats	Mark Eyskens (CVP)	7 seats
1999	Stef Goris (VLD)	Danny Pieters (VU)	Hagen Goyvaerts (VB)	André Schellens (PS)	Kristien Grauwels (Agalev)	Tony Smets (VLD)	7 seats	Mark Eyskens (CVP)	7 seats
