= Big Brother 2024 (Dutch and Belgian TV series) =

- Season 4
- Presented by: Geraldine Kemper; Tatyana Beloy
- No. of days: 93
- No. of housemates: 18
- Winner: Glenn Van Himst
- Runner-up: Alice Kappenburg
- No. of episodes: 78

Release
- Original network: Netherlands; RTL 5; RTL 4 (Premiere); Belgium; Play4
- Original release: 15 January – 13 April 2024

Season chronology
- ← Previous; Series 2023 Next → Series 2025

Big Brother 2024 is the fourth cooperation season of the Dutch and Belgian version of Big Brother. It is the tenth regular version of Big Brother in both Belgium and the Netherlands. In addition, it was an anniversary edition, as it was 25 years since the first version of Big Brother aired in 1999 in the Netherlands. The show is broadcast on RTL 5 in the Netherlands and Play4 in Belgium beginning on 15 January 2024. Live streams are available 24/7 on Videoland for Dutch viewers and on GoPlay.be and Telenet for Belgian viewers.

In August 2023, there was an announcement of the new season and a call for new housemates. The start date was revealed in December 2023. The interior was shown for the first time in January 2023.

Geraldine Kemper and Tatyana Beloy were again hosting. Before the start of the season they made a call for tolerance after hateful posts on social media during last season. The house was restyled. A new entrance was added. The interior had a 70s vibe. A second secret house was built and contained a mirror room, garden and secret hallway to the main house. Unlike previous seasons, this time housemates had to play in pairs.

The launch was considered successful since the ratings were higher than the previous season, reaching 483.000 viewers in the Netherlands. Ashley De Graaf was the second housemate ever in this cooperation series to return after being evicted for some hours. After this, she became one of the most popular housemates this season. Housemate Doriana La Monaca got a warning because she looked and talked too much straight into the camera, and Big Brother doesn't want his housemates to break the fourth wall. Like the two previous seasons, there were crowdfundings from fans to fly airplanes with banners over the house. This season it was a record number with six planes for Basiri, Tom, Randy, Tom and Ashley and two planes for Karen. For the first time, fans were allowed into the house during fan week during a freeze assignment where residents were not allowed to move and/or talk. When Ashley De Graaf bought an exemption for 20,000 euros of the prize money near the end, after weeks of being wronged by her fellow contestants, it made headlines. Tyron Bolwerk went home for 15,000 euros from the jackpot a week before the finals.

This season had fewer viewers in Flanders compared to previous seasons, but did see a strong increase in digital viewers and viewers via the other platforms. The general shift from linear to digital viewing continued strongly with Big Brother. In the Netherlands, the season had the highest ratings since the first collaborative season in 2021.

The final was on April 13, 2024. The winner was Glenn Van Himst. He won the lowest winner amount up to that point, which was 56,266 euros.

== Production ==
=== Format ===
Big Brother 2024 followed the same format as the previous seasons of the program. Housemates lived in isolation from the outside world in a custom-built house for a period of 100 days, hoping to be the last one to leave the house as the winner, and walk away with a large cash prize.

==== Concept ====
Producers of the reality show stated this season would have new rules compared to the other season. For the first time the housemates formed duos, put together by Big Brother.

=== Broadcasts ===
The first episode was pre-recorded on the evening of 10 January 2024 and simultaneously broadcast on RTL 4 and RTL 5 in the Netherlands, Play4 on Belgium on 15 January 2024. The Daily show aired from Monday to Friday with the live show on Saturday night.

== Housemates ==
Eight housemates entered the house during the launch. During the launch night, five extra housemates joined the house. In the second week another two housemates were added. At the start of the third week a new housemate joined the house as king. At the beginning of the fourth week two female housemates entered the house.

Several housemates already participated in other programs before their participation in Big Brother. For example, Ashley De Graaf participated in the reality search Hunted in 2017, Danny Hertveldt in the reality competition Homo Universalis in 2022, Lenie Gerrits in the reality soap Bij ons op het kamp in 2022 and Nouchka Willems in the reality survival Million Dollar Island in 2023.

Name	Age	Occupation	Country	Residence	Day entered	Day exited	Status
Glenn Van Himst	32	Car mechanic	Belgium	Stekene	16	93	Winner
Alice Kappenburg	19	Online content creator	Netherlands	Groningen	1	93	Runner-up
Randy Yonce	29	Internship Counselor	Netherlands	Amsterdam	1	93	3rd place
Jimmy Meijvogel	41	Dragqueen	Netherlands	Amsterdam	11	90	Evicted
Ashley De Graaf	33	Telemarketeer	Netherlands	Schagen	1	9	Evicted
Ashley De Graaf	33	Telemarketeer	Netherlands	Schagen	10	88	Evicted
Tom Peeters	31	Port worker	Belgium	Burcht	1	86	Evicted
Tyron Bolwerk	26	Factory employee & model	Netherlands	Heerhugowaard	1	82	Walked
Karen Baumans	32	Owner hairdressing salon & teacher	Belgium	Aarschot	1	79	Evicted
Danny Hertveldt	53	Police inspector	Belgium	Roosdaal Pamel	1	72	Evicted
Dilano De Kleijn	25	Accountmanager	Netherlands	Eindhoven	1	65	Evicted
Ronahi Coksayilir	28	Care worker	Belgium	Zonhoven	1	58	Evicted
Sabeau Michel	20	Consultant	Netherlands	Zaandam	23	51	Evicted
Doriana La Monaca	25	Video editor	Belgium	Helchteren	11	44	Evicted
Basiri Sari	23	Driver care transport	Belgium	Drongen	1	37	Evicted
Nouchka Willems	34	Sales coach	Belgium	Oostende	23	30	Evicted
Ariana Van Melick	36	Personal assistant	Netherlands	Soest	1	23	Evicted
Lenie Gerrits	52	Singer	Netherlands	Arnhem	1	16	Evicted
Sonja Libb	26	Student & waitress	Belgium	Antwerp	1	10	Walked

== Twists ==
=== Prize money ===
The prize money started again this season at €100.000. The prize money would decrease by housemates buying personal items or favors. The prize money could also increase by winning missions.

	Current total amount	What	Result	Increased/decreased
Week 1	€100.000 (Initial)			€0
Week 2	€93,800	Get the remaining suitcases by pushing the red button	Lenie pushed the button with his foot	-€6,200
Week 3	€94,800	Follow the house rules of the king and queen	All housemates succeeded	+€1,000
Week 4	€95,800	Keep the water in the water tank in duos	All housemates succeeded	+€1,000
Week 7	€94,416	Buying personal things	Alice, Glenn, Ronahi & Tyron	-€1.348
Week 7	€93,916	Punishment when sleeping during the day in the bedrooms	Ashley & Karen	-€500
Week 9	€92,916	Talking during a freeze	Ashley, Danny, Glenn, Tom & Tyron talked	-€1.000
Week 10	€87,916	Revealing their identity as undercovers	Danny, Jimmy & Karen	-€5.000
Week 10	€88,416	Winning the domino challenge	Ashley & Karen	+€500
Week 10	€68,416	Buying immunity	Ashley	-€20.000
Week 12	€53,416	The first to agree to leave the house today will receive €15,000	Tyron	-€15.000
Week 13	€55,266	Spatial insight challenge	Bet money: • Alice / €200 ✗; • Randy / €500 ✗; • Jimmy / €700 ✓; • Glenn / €1,000 ✓	+€500
Week 13	€56,366	Singing when the band stops challenge	Alice, Glenn, Jimmy & Randy	+€1,100
Week 13	€55,966	The money put on Jimmy if he should have been voted out	All housemates	-€400

=== Duos & coins ===
Duos were formed during the launch. The housemates in a duo had to work together, sleep together in the duo beds and do the household tasks in duo. From week 10, the duos were stopped. From then on, residents had to continue playing individually.

Housemates could earn and spend Big Brother coins. They could earn them by succeeding in tasks and spend them by shopping. Each duo had to share coins. Individual housemates, not in a duo, had their own wallet of coins.

Duo Blue
Duo Green
Duo Orange
Duo Pink
Duo Yellow
Duo Lightblue
Duo Lightpink
Not in Duo

	Week 1	Week 2	Week 3	Week 4	Week 5	Week 6	Week 7	Week 8	Week 9	Week 10	Week 11	Week 12
Alice	12			31	20					Unknown		
Ashley	4			12						Unknown		
Danny	19			31						Unknown		
Glenn	Not in house			12						Unknown		
Jimmy	Not in house			4						Unknown		
Karen	12			35	20					Unknown		
Randy	11			Safe or Solo house						Unknown		
Tom	1			23						Unknown		
Tyron	19			25						Unknown		
Dilano	Hidden house			4						Evicted (Day 65)		
Ronahi	Hidden house			23					Evicted (Day 58)			
Sabeau	Not in house			25				Evicted (Day 51)				
Doriana	Not in house			25			Evicted (Day 44)					
Basiri	5			35		Evicted (Day 37)						
Nouchka	Not in house			25	Evicted (Day 30)							
Ariana	4			Evicted (Day 23)								
Lenie	11		Evicted (Day 16)									
Sonja	1	Walked (Day 10)										

== Weekly summary ==
The main events in the Big Brother house are summarised in the table below.

Week 1
On Day 1, Rohani entered the house first. She was instructed to go to the secret house, the mirror house, and wait for further instructions. Next, Ashley, Alice, Basiri, Tyron, Lenie and Sonja enter the house. Only Basiri is allowed to take his suitcase. They each get 5 coins and can buy a hint for 2 coins. Ashley and Alice are the only ones who do this. They get the hint "look well in the eyes. The last resident is Dilano. He joins Rohani in the mirror house. When they get the green light, they get to go spy on the other residents in the normal house.

Five new residents enter the house the same night - Ariana, Danny, Karen, Randy and Tom. They are given a dilemma: take their own suitcase or that of another resident. Only Tom chooses another resident's suitcase. When they enter the house, Big Brother puts them in pairs with the other residents. Basiri is the only one who is not in a duo, he is given a locked suitcase by Big Brother instead. It is the first nomination he can use to nominate a duo in the first week.

The duos play the first game and must recognize their duo partner's eyes on screens. Alice & Karen succeed in this and thus win their own case. During the first night, Ariana shares with her fellow residents that she stutters.

Day 2 Dilano & Rohani are given a secret assignment to place four convex mirrors that will allow them to see the entire house from their secret viewing spot. The other residents are given the choice of opening an envelope. Danny does this immediately which makes his duo win 21 coins. The other duos must earn the coins, and go to the game arena where they must compete against another duo and turn as many tiles as possible so that their color is shown. Team yellow and team orange win and get 11 coins. The losing duos get 1 coin. In the evening, Dilano & Rohani must secretly retrieve a key from the cocoon room.

On Day 3, the residents play a casket game. When only three duos are left, Basiri gets to swap his box with a duo. He does this with duo Pink, Sonja & Tom. In Sonja & Tom's box is a nomination which makes them nominated, in Lenie and Randy's box an exemption, and in Ashley & Ariana's box 5 coins. Basiri must leave the house during the assignment and go to the mirror house.

On Day 4, the residents play the Power of Nomination Game. They have to get balls across via a construction, and eventually get five yellow balls in a row. Duo Danny & Tyron win. Mirror House residents can buy mystery chests in the Wall. When Ashley & Ariana buy two boxes, there is a discussion with the other residents.

Day 5 Danny & Tyron compete against each other for the Power of Nomination via a rope puzzle.

On Day 6, Alice and Karen buy two new mystery boxes. Basiri receives information from Big Brother that there will be two new residents, and that Basiri will put together the new duos. Basiri hears about the new residents via telephone.

On Day 7, Sonja and Tom were already nominated by Basiri's box. Ashley was nominated by Danny. Ashley, Sonja & Tom were nominated and faced the public vote.

On Day 9, Tom is the favorite nominated housemate for viewers. Ashley became the first housemate to be evicted.

Week 2 - F*cked up week
On Day 10, Sonja leaves the house because she is not feeling well. The residents of the mirror house join the other residents. The two new residents, Doriana & Jimmy, arrive. There are new duos, which Basiri previously put together. Due to Sonja's unexpected elopement, Ashley returns to the house after a few hours but she remains nominated. She forms a duo with Danny. The duos get to open the mystery boxes. Duo light rose has a nomination in their box which means Rohani and Tom are nominated.

On Day 11, the housemates play a game by duo in which they must find red-eye tokens in the house find and place them near photos of the duos to eliminate them. Basiri and Karen win the game and gain immunity as a result. Ariana is convinced that Tom likes her and confides in Karen. Ariana gives a guided meditation to the group that night. The revolving door opens to reveal the red button. The residents have five minutes to push the button and get a case for 2,500 euros for the jackpot. The housemates don't do this.

The housemates play a game on Day 12 in pairs for an exemption and must complete a 3D puzzle puzzle at the direction of their partner. Dilano & Jimmy win. Danny also wins thanks to his nominated partner Ashley. The red button reappears in the revolving door. Residents can buy the remaining suitcases for 6,200 euros. While all residents say not to do this, Lenie taps the button with his foot. Ashley does not understand this and an argument ensues. Tyron sails against Ashley out because he thinks she reacts too violently; Ashley thinks it is comedy from Lenie.

On Day 13 Ronahi & Tom's secret mission fails, leaving them nominated. They had to find four of five non-matching objects in the house, they found three. duo Ariana/Randy wins the game for the exemption in which they were spun around and had to shoot plates with slingshot.

The final nominees Alice, Ashley, Doriana, Lenie, Ronahi, Tom & Tyron must go to the game room on Day 14 and can hand out three exemptions. Alice, Ashley & Lenie were nominated and faced the public vote. On Day 15 Ariana confides in Karen that she is thinking of voluntarily leaving the house on Sunday.

On Day 16, Alice is the favorite nominated housemate for viewers. Lenie became the second housemate to be evicted. Ashley also does not return to the house. The residents don't get it and think both were evicted.

Week 3 - King and Queen week
Ashley who won the vote goes to the secret house that is now the Big Brother castle. She is crowned queen, and is joined by new resident Glenn, who becomes king. They are given a generous supper. The king and queen have immunity from nominations, determine what is in the Wall and earn this money if a housemate buys it, and set house rules. The first house rule is to guard the house when the alarm sounds.

The housemates get to see their king and queen for the first time on Day 17, discovering that Ashley is still in the game. There is the first throne fight: running a ball through a labyrinth. Ashley and Glenn win and remain king and queen. queen Ashley & king Glenn establish the second house rule: brush teeth together when getting up and sleeping.

On Day 18 Ronahi & Tom win the throne fight by playing the game over countries and go to the castle. They choose the third house rule: pump 10 times when getting up. On Day 19 The housemates choose their final King and Queen by listing their candidates in the game room. Dilano & Jimmy win and therefore have immunity. They choose a final house rule: whoever gets up last has to make all the beds.

It's Glenn birthday on Day 20. While he is in the diary room, the residents decorate the house. Big Brother gives them cupcakes. The residents have to nominate in pairs, which evokes emotions. Karen thinks her duo partner Basiri is too dominant. Ronahi accuses Tom of naming a duo she would not choose. In the evening, the residents receive the result of their wish assignment, a joint dinner. Kings Dilano & Jimmy join the dinner. Back at the castle, they get to exempt two nominated duos. They exempt Ashley/Glenn and Ronahi/Tom.

On Day 21 It's Basiri's birthday. He gets cake from Big Brother. A plane with a banner flies over the garden for him. The nominees are announced. Ariana, Doriana, Randy & Tyron were nominated and faced the public vote. Dilano & Jimmy return to the house.

Ashley is angry with Ariana on Day 22 and says she doesn't want people talking behind her back. In the game area, there are fitness machines on which the residents have to do an assignment. Ronahi and Tom have a disagreement over the dishes.

On Day 23, Randy & Tyron the favorite nominated housemates for viewers. Ariana became the third housemate to be evicted.

Week 4 - Safe or Solo week
Randy has to leave the house and goes to the secret house which is now the Safe or Solo house. Nouchka and Sabeau are new housemates.

The residents are given a game for the jackpot on Day 24: they must keep running water in containers for each pair. Randy learns that whoever is in the Safe and Solo house is nominated. He can compete against duos to switch his nomination. The duo he chooses is Ronahi and Tom. Tom accepts the challenge. Tom joins Randy in the Safe and Solo house.

On Day 25 Randy and Tom have to do a balancing act with blocks. Tom wins and returns teryg to the house. Randy remains nominated. Randy challenges a new duo: Nouchka and Sabeau. Nouchka goes to the Safe and Solo house. Nouchka and Randy compete on Day 26 and must place blocks in the correct order and color on 5 poles. Nouchka wins and returns to the house. Randy chooses the last duo he can compete against: Doriana & Tyron. Tyron moves to the Safe and Solo house. Dilano tells Jimmy that he likes Sabeau; Jimmy warns him to be careful.

On Day 27 the housemates passed the water runner task. Randy and Tyron compete for the nomination. This is a cycling task where lights come on while cycling, and they have to recreate this pattern in the garden. Randy wins and returns to the house. Tyron has to return alone to the Safe and Solo house and is nominated for the following Saturday. Doriana & Randy become a new duo. The residents are called to nominate. Each duo must say two names (not necessarily from the same duo).

The nominees are announced on Day 28. Ashley, Nouchka & Tyron were nominated and faced the public vote. Ashley and Danny discuss the nominations. According to Ashley, there are snakes in the house and nomination appointments made by Doriana and Ronahi. Ashley and Nouchka go to the Safe and Solo house. The other housemates have to make a last supper dinner for the nominees. On Day 29, the nominees return to the house. Alice discovers that her boyfriend's pajamas are gone, they have gone to the wash, and cannot stop crying.

On Day 30, Ashley is the favorite nominated housemate for viewers. Nouchka became the fourth housemate to be evicted.

Week 5 - Love & Surprise week

Big Brother calls the housemates to the game room. All pairs are separated and must divide their coins. There is 1 golden envelope that they have to give to 1 housemate. The choice is between Basiri and Randy but Basiri gives it to Randy. The envelope says Randy is gamemaster of that week. The housemates get a bachelor party for the start of the new week and being single.

On Day 31 gamemaster Randy gets to designate five housemates for the coins game: he chooses Dilano, Doriana, Glenn, Jimmy and Ronahi. Each of them must complete tasks in the gameroom for coins. New duos are formed and gamemaster Randy gets to choose in which order housemates choose a duo partner.

After Ronahi imitates Tom at the table on Day 32, he gets angry. He thinks she keeps making fun of him. Alice, Basiri and Randy buy letters from home from the Wall. The residents are given a dilemma by duo: buy letters from the fans for 500 euros per duo. No duo buys the letters. The housemates regret it afterwards, and Ashley suggests to Big Brother that they want to buy all the letters anyway for 3,500 euros. Big Brother refuses, saying they've had their chance and that he's not negotiating. Duo Jimmy & Tom leave the house. They go to the surprise room where Jimmy transforms into his drag queen alter ego Heisa Jincx. That night he gives a performance for the other residents.

Day 33 Danny's daughter's birthday and all the residents make a birthday message for her. Gamemaster Randy gets to decide which duos will play the Power of Nomination. He chooses: Alice & Karen, Danny & Glenn, Ronahi & Tyron, Doriana & Randy and Dilano & Sabeau. The other housemates feel that Randy always favors the same housemates.

The Power of Nomination game is played on Day 34, and again it is a game about favoritism. Each duo must walk on a treadmill, take balls from tubes and move them into a tube of the other duos. The duo that has the most balls in their quiver wins the Power of Nomination. This duo is Doriana & Randy. The housemates who did not get to play find it unfair that gamemaster Randy gets this too. Dilano lies to Jimmy that his duo split the balls between Jimmy & Tom's quiver and Doriana & Randy's quiver. The same day Doriana & Randy have to nominate two duos.

On Day 35 The nominees are announced: Ashley & Basiri and Alice & Karen. According to the other residents, there is a nomination conspiracy. Randy claims the nominations were random. But Doriana, Randy, Ronahi and Tyron discuss that they hope Ashley has to leave and fear that if this does not happen, there will be war in the house. Ashley gets nicknamed the general by her housemate friends. A plane flies over the house with a message for Tom "Tom. Your fans are behind you." The housemates each get 1 minute to read the fans' letters in the gameroom.

On Day 36 it is Doriana's birthday and she gets surprises from her family. All housemates get a Valentine's dinner that night.

On Day 37, Basiri became the fifth housemate to be evicted.

Week 6 - Winner's week
On Day 37, residents may give 1 housemate an exemption. This one goes to Karen. On Day 38, four duos buy game ticket for the first winner games. All duos have to go the gameroom and do a Big Brother voting.

Day 39, Dilano & Sabeau win the first winner games and are therefore exempt from nomination. Alice and Ashley get to go to the secret room, which is set up as a pizzeria. They also get to see the ranking of the voting there.

On Day 40 the housemates play a mind game with tokens they have to place with the other residents. As a result, Danny & Glenn get nominated by Ronahi & Tyron. Ronahi & Tyron have an exemption.

All residents not yet nominated or exempt play one last game - a maze with ball - on Day 41. Tyron is so annoyed with Ashley that he says he will nominate her every time from now on.

On Day 42, the nominated duos must give a speech one duo at a time to exempt them from the nominations anyway. The other residents are moved by Jimmy & Tom's speech and give the exemption to them. Danny & Glenn and Doriana & Randy are nominated. Day 43 ends with a pizza night where Danny and Doriana make pizza at the pizzeria.

On Day 44, a plane flies by for Randy. During the live, Danny & Glenn are the viewers' favorite nominated housemates. Doriana became the sixth housemate to be evicted.

Week 7 - Power/Powerless week
On Day 44, new duos are put together by Big Brother and divided in powerful and powerless housemates. Day 45 starts with a deluxe breakfast for the powerful housemates.

On Day 46, the powerful housemates get to buy some personal items. Alice, Glenn, Ronahi & Tyron do this. The money goes from the jackpot. Ashley gives her powerful status to her duo partner Karen. The powerful residents - Alice, Glenn, Jimmy, Karen, Ronahi and Tyron - get to go to the secret room, which this week is Café Grote Broer, for a fun evening.

On Day 47, Karen and Jimmy relinquish their powerful status to their respective duo partners Ashley & Dilano. Ronahi falls at the math challenge when she wants to run too fast to the game room. The powerful housemates - Alice, Ashley, Dilano, Glenn, Sabeau and Tom - are allowed to go to the secret room Café Grote Broer for a bingo night. Once they are all back in the house, the residents play a game in which they slap each other with a pancake. When Tom does this pretty hard to Sabeau, she reacts very emotionally to this afterwards to the other housemates.

On Day 48, the housemates play a final game. As a result, Alice, Danny, Dilano, Karen, Sabeay and Tyron are powerless residents. They are not allowed to nominate.

Ashley & Karen are punished by Big Brother for sleeping in bed on Day 49. 500 EUR goes from the jackpot. The nominees are announced: these are Jimmy, Sabeau & Tyron. It is also made clear that the powerful residents could take over a nomination and Jimmy has taken over Dilano's nomination. Jimmy explains that Dilano is his buddy and he always wanted to play the game with him. Dilano is having a hard time with this. Day 50 concludes with a pizza night.

On Day 51, Ashley and Tom are surprised by a plane from their fans. During the live, Jimmy is the favorite nominated housemate for viewers. Sabeau became the seventh housemate to be evicted.

Week 8 - Fun week
On Day 51, housemates celebrate New Year as the fun week kicks off. In the gameroom, they can find game tickets and an exemption in thousands of balloons. Dilano finds the exemption.

Christmas is celebrated on Day 53. Danny wins the first Power of Nomination in a game with packages. On Day 54 Dilano & Jimmy have a secret mission and leave the house and go to the Halloween room. Ashley, Glenn, Karen & Tyron buy game tickets from the Wall and play a game in Big Brother's horror house. From the Halloween room, Dilano and Glenn can set off noises in the house. That night there is a Halloween party. The best outfit is awarded by the fans with a personal item, this one Tom gets.

Ashley, Glenn, Karen and Tom play the second Power of Nomination game where they have to complete a puzzle on Day 55. Glenn wins. Day 56 is started with an Easter brunch. The nominations are announced: Alice, Ronahi & Tyron. Some residents are angry because Danny had said he would nominate Ashley and Tom. Danny claims this was a joke.

On Day 57, Tom gets Ashley crying because of a comment about her husband. He later tries to talk this out with her. The residents receive a barbecue gift from Big Brother.

On Day 58, not 1 but 2 planes fly over the Big Brother house for Karen. During the live, Alice is the favorite nominated housemate for the viewers. Ronahi became the eighth housemate to be evicted.

Week 9 - Fan week
On Day 58, the housemates are visited twice by Big Brother presenters with a group of fans while the housemates should be in freeze. The second time, the housemates fail, causing 1,000 EUR to go out of the jackpot. The new duos - put together by the fans - are also announced.

On Day 59, the housemates' biggest fans - a family member or friend - play a game in the gameroom. Ashley's husband & Randy's sister win giving these two housemates an exemption. Danny & Glenn get phone calls from fans. For Glenn, there are only compliments. Danny is advised to be less of a follower of Ashley. In the evening, Ashley & Tyron have an argument over a pan. Tyron is so angry that he has moved bedrooms because he no longer wants to sleep in 1 room with Ashley.

On Day 60, housemates can buy fan questions from the Wall. There is also a game played for coins in which the pairs must pass a container of water through their backs to each other. After the game, everyone gets to take a hot shower. There is fan phone for Ashley & Randy. Both get counseling. There is fan phone for Alice & Jimmy. Alice is applauded for how beautifully she is playing the game. There is a warning for Jimmy: he plays the game well but has a blind spot. Jimmy understands this is about Dilano, and has a bad feeling about this.

On Day 61 The housemates are given statements and quotes from fans by duo in the gameroom and must pair them with the remaining housemates. The duo with the highest score wins entry to the fan house. This is Dilano & Tyron who achieved 7 out of 10. Dilano & Tyron get to go to the fan house where they can read all kinds of messages on social media from fans. Also, a phone rings through which they occasionally hear messages for different residents. They decide that there is something positive and negative for each resident, and advise fans above all to play the game less hard and especially enjoy the unique Big Brother experience. On Day 62, Karen and Tom win an exemption through a game in which each duo still playing had to untie themselves between beams while attached to each other with a rope, and then cut this rope as the fastest. There is a phone call from fans in the diary room for Ashley & Randy. Ashley is advised to enjoy the game more. Randy is advised to be less lazy. In the afternoon, there is a phone for Dilano & Tyron. For Dilano, there is a poem saying he is a venom. For Tyron there is the message that he is doing well but needs to work things out faster. Afterwards there is a phone call for Alice & Jimmy. Alice is complimented on how she behaves in the house. Jimmy gets a warning for Dilano. Jimmy says that throughout fan week he was only advised not to trust Dilano. The housemates nominate. There is a tie between Alice, Danny, Dilano & Tyron. The fans, without the housemates knowing, can exempt one housemate. This is Tyron.

On Day 63, the nominees are announced: these are Alice, Danny & Dilano. After the announcement, a plane flies by for Danny. Alice has her 20th birthday on day 64. She gets cards and cake from her family and friends. The other residents prepare a celebratory meal chosen by the viewers. Karen notices that Tom is ignoring her.

On Day 65, a plane flies over for Tyron. During the live, Alice is the viewers' favorite nominated housemate. Dilano became the ninth housemate to be evicted.

Week 10 - Undercover week
Day 65 marks the start of the new week, undercover week. The housemates are assigned their roles in the diary room. Danny, Jimmy & Karen are the undercovers.

On Day 66, the housemates are given two rectangles with balls in them: one bin for the undercovers and one bin for the residents. The group with the most balls wins at the end of the week, winning voting rights. The housemates decide to constantly guard the bins in pairs. The housemates get to go to the gameroom and get information about the undercovers. The housemates discover that the undercovers are three. The undercovers discover the identities of the other undercovers. Karen and Tom have an argument. Tom says he can no longer trust her because Karen revealed their nominations as a duo from the previous week. The housemates are given an assignment over several days: make a domino track through the house.

On Day 67, there is a game that the undercovers win. They had to pass nine sentences to each other. The undercovers won an additional assignment by being able to hide the domino track ball. As a result, the undercovers won 50 balls and could also steal balls from the residents again.

On Day 68, Ashley discovers that Danny is undercover; he asks her to keep quiet. Big Brother reports that 5,000 EUR goes out of the jackpot because the undercovers revealed their secret role. So the other housemates have won and will have voting rights later in the week. The domino bricks are cleared away. The housemates play a game for coins.

Day 69 ends with a freeze for Danny his daughter, wife, mother and brother stop by the house. They bring French fries for the residents. Danny doesn't move but can't hold back his tears. On Day 70 the nominees are announced. These are Ashley, Danny, Glenn and Jimmy. In the afternoon, the ninth plane, for Glenn, flies by. Day 71 Big Brother gives residents a domino challenge for the upcoming Live.

Day 72 residents earn 500 euros by completing the domino task during the Live show. Glenn and Jimmy are the viewer favorites and are allowed to stay. Danny became the tenth housemate to be evicted.

Week 11 - Now or never week
After Ashley's return, there is a commotion. Karen thinks Alice, Randy, Tom and Tyron were extremely disrespectful by playing a card game - as if they didn't care who would leave the house and who would return. Big Brother announces the new theme, now or never. Immediately after, the nomination alarm goes off. Ashley, Glenn and Tyron are the new nominees.

On Day 73 housemates are given a dilemma. They can buy a semifinal ticket with money from the jackpot. No one does this. Afterwards, it appears that all the food is gone from the house. Jimmy gets to go first to the Big Brother shop where he can buy food for coins, but there are also offers such as an exemption for 1,500 euros, an extra nomination vote for 1,250 euros, a personal item for 750 euros and a voice message for 1,000 euros ... for money from the jackpot. Jimmy only buys food. Every day a housemate will have to go to the shop to buy food. The group agrees that only housemates will be allowed to go to the shop who will definitely not take money from the jackpot. The residents may write a letter to family and friends the same day.

Day 74 housemates play a game with lamps where they must discover the light that stays on for coins. The tenth plane, this time for Alice, flies by. The housemates are given a musical assignment for money for the jackpot. The resident who is called must be able to continue singing the song that is playing when the music is stopped.

On Day 75 housemates must decide which four housemates will play a game for semifinal week. In the end, these will be Alice, Glenn, Jimmy and Tyron. The housemate who wins presses an hourglass at the best time. Glenn wins and is definitely in the semifinals the following week. Day 76 there is a Freeze for Randy, his girlfriend enters the house. Tyron wins a ticket to the semifinal week through a game. He has immunity. All housemate, except Ashley, nominate.

Day 77 begins with a message from Big Brother: Ashley, Jimmy, Karen and Randy are the provisional nominees. The foursome is next given a dilemma in the game room: an exemption for a sum of up to 20,000 euros that ticks off during a countdown clock. Once the clock starts, Ashley presses several times without hesitation. She is exempt but 20,000 euros immediately goes off the jackpot. Jimmy, Karen and Randy are now the nominees for an exit next Saturday. The other housemates are angry and Ashley in tears. Only Glenn and Tom talk to Ashley and want to understand her. Karen doubts Ashley's sincerity and their friendship. In the evening, Ashley does not eat with the group and has a very long conversation in the diary room.

On Day 78, Ashley tries to strike up a conversation with Karen about the button, but she has no desire to do so. Moments later, an eleventh plane flies over for Ashley. She bursts into tears and feels supported by her family and fans. Jimmy feels that she is crawling into victimhood. On Day 79, Randy is the first to be exempted by the public. Karen became the eleventh housemate to be evicted. She does so without having a proper conversation with Ashley.

Week 12 - Semi final week
After the Live, housemates go to the game room that is now the Big Brother movie theater. Residents get to see movies from the home front there. On Day 80, housemates wake up to a game with family and friends. Each housemate must guess a word that refers to an object in the house. To find it, they get help through their relative. Randy wins and gets a ticket to the game for finals week as a result. In the evening, the housemates play a game for the jackpot in which they must individually memorize symbols.

The housemates play a memory lane game on Day 81 and must place ten events in Big Brother in the correct order and link them to residents. Tom wins and has everything correct. He wins a ticket to the game for finals week. After it, the housemates have to make a lifeline of their Big Brother adventure. After this, Big Brother shares the date of the finals with them for the first time.

On Day 82, Ashley wins a game ticket through a gun play in the gameroom. This allows Tyron to go to the diary room. He gets the chance to get 15,000 euros from the jackpot but then he has to leave the house immediately, without saying goodbye to the other housemates. Tyron does so and leaves the house to the disbelief of the other housemates.

Day 83 Ashley, Randy and Tom play a game before finals week. It is a game where balls had to be balanced and then get into certain openings via a pinball machine. Ashley wins and is definitely in the final week. The residents nominate for the very last time.

Day 84, the nominations are announced. Glenn, Randy and Tom are the nominees. According to Tom, Jimmy voted tactically. A plane flies by for Jimmy for the first time. Jmmy is ecstatic, his fellow inmates are also happy, only Tom is quieter. Ashley buys a personal item, a photo, in the Big Brother Shop.

On Day 85, Jimmy confronts Tom. Jimmy sees him as his buddy and is sorry that Tom can't even be happy for Jimmy when he finally gets a plane - and message from the outside world. According to Jimmy, Tom ignores him. A thirteenth plane flies over for Ashley and Glenn with the message "Queen Ash King Glenn - your fans". Day 86 a fourteenth plane flies over for Randy. Glenn is viewers favorite. Tom has to leave the house since he's the twelfth housemate to be evicted.

Week 13 - Final week
Big Brother announces finals week. The housemates play a late night game for immunity. Balance and equilibrium is important in the game. Glenn wins first and Alice wins second immunity. Day 87 starts with a secret assignment for Jimmy where former housemate Dilano makes breakfast for the day. Jimmy breaks the assignment and has a pleasant chat with Dilano. Ashley, Jimmy and Randy play a game for immunity. It involves getting knots out of ropes. Jimmy is the fastest and is exempt. Ashley and Randy are the nominees. Former resident Tyron comes into the house for a Freeze. In the evening, the Big Brother Awards are presented for which the public could vote.

Day 88 the presenters are in the gameroom. The housemate with the fewest votes must leave the house. This is Ashley. The music assignment from a few weeks ago returns to replenish the jackpot. In the evening, the housemates are given individual jackpot assignments. Only Glenn and Jimmy succeed, raising the jackpot by 1,000 and 700 euros, respectively.Day 89, the four housemates can hit the jackpot by solving a numerical code. They must also put money on themselves and the other residents in whoever they believe will make it to Saturday's finale. Jimmy has a hard time with this because there is little betting on him.

On Day 90, there is the final exit. Jimmy has to leave the house as the very last one before the finale. 400 euros goes from the jackpot that was bet on Jimmy as a finalist. Alice, Glenn and Randy now compete for the title of winner. The three finalists each get a Freeze assignment. For Glenn, his girlfriend and infant son comes along, for Randy his mother, and for Alice also her mother. The finalists succeed and therefore win money for the jackpot.

On Day 91, the finalists get a chance to buy souvenirs of their adventure from the Wall. The game room is turned into the Room of Truth where they have to answer questions from each other. Afterwards, they get to go to the Big Brother Boutique to choose a final outfit. Afterwards, they have a press conference in the gameroom where they have to answer questions from fans and former inmates. On Day 92, housemates receive unlimited hot water for the first time. The jackpot is closed. The winner gets 56,266 euros. For the last night, the finalists get pizza.

On Day 93, it's the grand finale. The finalists start the day with a luxury breakfast. In the studio are all the former residents and the three previous winners. Randy finishes third. The last two finalists Alice and Glenn get to go into the studio. While checking the votes, the presenters turn to Alice & Glenn one last time. Alice comes in second. Glenn wins the fourth season.

== Episodes ==
No. overall	No. in season	Title	Day(s)	Original release date
Week 1 - Launch week
227	1	"Episode 1 - Launch"	Day 1	January 15, 2024
228	2	"Episode 2"	Day 2-3	January 16, 2024
229	3	"Episode 3"	Day 3-4	January 17, 2024
230	4	"Episode 4"	Day 4-6	January 18, 2024
231	5	"Episode 5"	Day 6-7	January 19, 2024
232	6	"Episode 6"	Day 7-9 & Live Show 1	January 20, 2024
Week 2 - F*cked up week
233	7	"Episode 7"	Day 9-10	January 22, 2024
234	8	"Episode 8"	Day 10-11	January 23, 2024
235	9	"Episode 9"	Day 11-12	January 24, 2024
236	10	"Episode 10"	Day 12-13	January 25, 2024
237	11	"Episode 11"	Day 13-14	January 26, 2024
238	12	"Episode 12"	Day 14-16 & Live Show 2	January 27, 2024
Week 3 - King and Queen week
239	13	"Episode 13"	Day 16-17	January 29, 2024
240	14	"Episode 14"	Day 17-18	January 30, 2024
241	15	"Episode 15"	Day 18-19	January 31, 2024
242	16	"Episode 16"	Day 19-20	February 1, 2024
243	17	"Episode 17"	Day 20-21	February 2, 2024
244	18	"Episode 18"	Day 21-23 & Live Show 3	February 3, 2024
Week 4 - Safe or Solo week
245	19	"Episode 19"	Day 23-24	February 5, 2024
246	20	"Episode 20"	Day 24-25	February 6, 2024
247	21	"Episode 21"	Day 25-26	February 7, 2024
248	22	"Episode 22"	Day 26-27	February 8, 2024
249	23	"Episode 23"	Day 27-28	February 9, 2024
250	24	"Episode 24"	Day 28-30 & Live Show 4	February 10, 2024
Week 5 - Love & Surprise week
251	25	"Episode 25"	Day 30-31	February 12, 2024
252	26	"Episode 26"	Day 31-32	February 13, 2024
253	27	"Episode 27"	Day 32-33	February 14, 2024
254	28	"Episode 28"	Day 33-34	February 15, 2024
255	29	"Episode 29"	Day 34-35	February 16, 2024
256	30	"Episode 30"	Day 35-37 & Live Show 5	February 17, 2024
Week 6 - Winner's week
257	31	"Episode 31"	Day 37-38	February 19, 2024
258	32	"Episode 32"	Day 38-39	February 20, 2024
259	33	"Episode 33"	Day 39-40	February 21, 2024
260	34	"Episode 34"	Day 40-41	February 22, 2024
261	35	"Episode 35"	Day 41-42	February 23, 2024
262	36	"Episode 36"	Day 42-44 & Live Show 6	February 24, 2024
Week 7 - Power/Powerless week
263	37	"Episode 37"	Day 44-45	February 26, 2024
264	38	"Episode 38"	Day 45-46	February 27, 2024
265	39	"Episode 39"	Day 46-47	February 28, 2024
266	40	"Episode 40"	Day 47-48	February 29, 2024
267	41	"Episode 41"	Day 48-49	March 1, 2024
268	42	"Episode 42"	Day 49-51 & Live Show 7	March 2, 2024
Week 8 - Fun week
269	43	"Episode 43"	Day 51-52	March 4, 2024
270	44	"Episode 44"	Day 52-53	March 5, 2024
271	45	"Episode 45"	Day 53-54	March 6, 2024
272	46	"Episode 46"	Day 54-55	March 7, 2024
273	47	"Episode 47"	Day 55-56	March 8, 2024
274	48	"Episode 48"	Day 56-58 & Live Show 8	March 9, 2024
Week 9 - Fan week
275	49	"Episode 49"	Day 58-59	March 11, 2024
276	50	"Episode 50"	Day 59-60	March 12, 2024
277	51	"Episode 51"	Day 60-61	March 13, 2024
278	52	"Episode 52"	Day 61-62	March 14, 2024
279	53	"Episode 53"	Day 62-63	March 15, 2024
280	54	"Episode 54"	Day 63-65 & Live Show 9	March 16, 2024
Week 10 - Undercover week
281	55	"Episode 55"	Day 65-66	March 18, 2024
282	56	"Episode 56"	Day 66-67	March 19, 2024
283	57	"Episode 57"	Day 67-68	March 20, 2024
284	58	"Episode 58"	Day 68-69	March 21, 2024
285	59	"Episode 59"	Day 69-70	March 22, 2024
286	60	"Episode 60"	Day 70-72 & Live Show 10	March 23, 2024
Week 11 - Now or never week
287	61	"Episode 61"	Day 72-73	March 25, 2024
288	62	"Episode 62"	Day 73-74	March 26, 2024
289	63	"Episode 63"	Day 74-75	March 27, 2024
290	64	"Episode 64"	Day 75-76	March 28, 2024
291	65	"Episode 65"	Day 76-77	March 29, 2024
292	66	"Episode 66"	Day 77-79 & Live Show 11	March 30, 2024
Week 12 - Semi-final week
293	67	"Episode 67"	Day 79-80	April 1, 2024
294	68	"Episode 68"	Day 80-81	April 2, 2024
295	69	"Episode 69"	Day 81-82	April 3, 2024
296	70	"Episode 70"	Day 82-83	April 4, 2024
297	71	"Episode 71"	Day 83-84	April 5, 2024
298	72	"Episode 72"	Day 84-86 & Live Show 12	April 6, 2024
Week 13 - Final week
299	73	"Episode 73"	Day 86-87	April 8, 2024
300	74	"Episode 74"	Day 87-88	April 9, 2024
301	75	"Episode 75"	Day 88-89	April 10, 2024
302	76	"Episode 76"	Day 89-90	April 11, 2024
303	77	"Episode 77"	Day 90-91	April 12, 2024
304	78	"Episode 78"	Day 91-93 & Live Show Final	April 13, 2024

== Nominations table ==
Housemates from The Netherlands
Housemates from Belgium

	Week 1		Week 2	Week 3	Week 4	Week 5	Week 6	Week 7	Week 8	Week 9	Week 10	Week 11	Week 12	Week 13			
	Locker nominations	Nominations	Week 2	Week 3	Week 4	Week 5	Week 6	Week 7	Week 8	Week 9	Week 10	Week 11	Week 12	Day 88	Day 90	Final	
Glenn	Not in house			Basiri/Karen; Doriana/Tyron	Nouchka; Sabeau	No; Nominations	Nominated	Dilano; Sabeau; Tyron	Alice; Ronahi; Tyron	Alice; Dilano; Tyron	Alice; Randy; Tom; Tyron	Alice; Jimmy; Randy	Alice; Randy; Tom	No; Nominations	Nominated	Winner (Day 93)	
Alice	No; Nominations	No; Nominations	Nominated	Ashley/Glenn; Ariana/Randy	Dilano; Nouchka	Nominated	No; Nominations	No; Nominations	Nominated	Danny; Dilano; Tyron	Ashley; Danny; Glenn; Jimmy	Jimmy; Karen; Randy	Glenn; Jimmy; Randy	No; Nominations	Nominated	Runner-Up (Day 93)	
Randy	No; Nominations	No; Nominations	No; Nominations	Alice/Danny; Ronahi/Tom	Ashley; Glenn	Ashley/Basiri; Alice/Karen	Nominated	Dilano; Karen; Sabeau	No; Nominations	Alice; Dilano; Jimmy	Ashley; Danny; Glenn; Jimmy	Jimmy; Karen; Tom	Glenn; Jimmy; Tom	Nominated	Nominated	Third Place (Day 93)	
Jimmy	Not in house		No; Nominations	No; Nominations	Alice; Ashley	No; Nominations	No; Nominations	Alice; Sabeau; Tyron	No; Nominations	Danny; Dilano; Tyron	Nominated	Alice; Karen; Randy	Glenn; Randy; Tom	No; Nominations	Nominated	Evicted (Day 90)	
Ashley	No; Nominations	Nominated	Nominated	Basiri/Karen; Doriana/Tyron	Nouchka; Sabeau	Nominated	No; Nominations	Alice; Sabeau; Tyron	No; Nominations	Alice; Dilano; Jimmy	Alice; Jimmy; Randy; Tyron	Alice; Jimmy; Randy	Alice; Randy; Tom	Nominated	Evicted (Day 88)		
Tom	Nominated	Nominated	No; Nominations	Ariana/Randy; Doriana/Tyron	Ashley; Danny	No; Nominations	No; Nominations	Dilano; Sabeau; Tyron	No; Nominations	Danny; Dilano; Tyron	Ashley; Danny; Glenn; Randy	Jimmy; Karen; Randy	Glenn; Jimmy; Randy	Evicted (Day 86)			
Tyron	No; Nominations	No; Nominations	No; Nominations	Ariana/Randy; Ashley/Glenn	Nominated	No; Nominations	No; Nominations	Nominated	Nominated	Alice; Danny; Glenn	Ashley; Danny; Glenn; Jimmy	Alice; Jimmy; Karen	Walked (Day 82)				
Karen	No; Nominations	No; Nominations	No; Nominations	Ariana/Randy; Ronahi/Tom	Nouchka; Sabeau	Nominated	No; Nominations	No; Nominations	No; Nominations	Danny; Dilano; Tyron	No; Nominations	Alice; Randy; Tom	Evicted (Day 79)				
Danny	No; Nominations	Ashley	No; Nominations	Ashley/Glenn; Ariana/Randy	Dilano; Nouchka	No; Nominations	Nominated	No; Nominations	Alice; Ronahi; Tyron	Alice; Dilano; Tyron	Nominated	Evicted (Day 72)					
Dilano	In hidden house		No; Nominations	No; Nominations	Alice; Ashley	No; Nominations	No; Nominations	Saved by Jimmy	No; Nominations	Alice; Danny; Glenn	Evicted (Day 65)						
Ronahi	In hidden house		No; Nominations	Ariana/Randy; Doriana/Tyron	Ashley; Danny	No; Nominations	No; Nominations	Danny; Karen; Sabeau	Nominated	Evicted (Day 58)							
Sabeau	Not in house				Basiri; Tom	No; Nominations	No; Nominations	Nominated	Evicted (Day 51)								
Doriana	Not in house		No; Nominations	Ariana/Randy; Ashley/Glenn	Ashley; Glenn	Ashley/Basiri; Alice/Karen	Nominated	Evicted (Day 44)									
Basiri	Sonja; Tom	In hidden house	No; Nominations	Ariana/Randy; Ronahi/Tom	Nouchka; Sabeau	Nominated	Evicted (Day 37)										
Nouchka	Not in house				Basiri; Tom	Evicted (Day 30)											
Ariana	No; Nominations	No; Nominations	No; Nominations	Alice/Danny; Ronahi/Tom	Evicted (Day 23)												
Lenie	No; Nominations	No; Nominations	Nominated	Evicted (Day 16)													
Sonja	Nominated	Nominated	Walked (Day 10)														
Notes	1			2						3							
Source																	
Power of Nomination	Basiri	Danny	none	Alice/Danny; Ariana/Randy; Ashley/Glenn; Basiri/Karen; Doriana/Tyron; Ronahi/Tom	Alice/Danny; Ashley/Glenn; Basiri/Karen; Doriana/Randy; Nouchka/Sabeau; Ronahi/Tom	Doriana/Randy	All housemates	Ashley; Glenn; Jimmy; Randy; Ronahi; Tom	Danny; Glenn	All housemates	Alice; Ashley; Glenn; Randy; Tom; Tyron	All housemates	All housemates	none			
Immunity winner	none	Lenie; Randy	All housemates except nominees	Dilano; Jimmy	none	none	Karen; Alice/Ashley; Dilano/Sabeau; Ronahi/Tyron	Ashley; Glenn; Jimmy; Randy; Ronahi; Tom	Dilano; Jimmy	Ashley/Randy; Karen/Tom	none	Ashley; Glenn; Tyron	Ashley	Alice; Glenn; Jimmy	none		
Against public vote	none	Ashley; Sonja; Tom	Alice; Ashley; Lenie	Ariana; ~~Ashley~~; Doriana; ~~Glenn~~; Randy; ~~Ronahi~~; ~~Tom~~; Tyron	Ashley; Nouchka; Tyron	Alice; Ashley; Basiri; Karen	Danny; Doriana; Glenn; ~~Jimmy~~; Randy; ~~Tom~~	~~Dilano~~; Jimmy; Sabeau; Tyron	Alice; Ronahi; Tyron	Alice; Danny; Dilano; ~~Tyron~~	Ashley; Danny; Glenn; Jimmy	Jimmy; Karen; Randy	Glenn; Randy; Tom	Ashley; Randy	Alice; Glenn; Jimmy; Randy	Alice; Glenn; Randy	
Walked	none		Sonja	none									Tyron	none			
Evicted	Ashley; Fewest votes to save		Lenie; Fewest votes to save	Ariana; Fewest votes to save	Nouchka; Fewest votes to save	Basiri; Fewest votes to save	Doriana; Fewest votes to save	Sabeau; Fewest votes to save	Ronahi; Fewest votes to save	Dilano; Fewest votes to save	Danny; Fewest votes to save	Karen; Fewest votes to save	Tom; Fewest votes to save	Ashley; Fewest votes to save	Jimmy; Fewest votes to save	Randy; Fewest votes to win	Alice; Fewest votes to win
Evicted	Ashley; Fewest votes to save		Lenie; Fewest votes to save	Ariana; Fewest votes to save	Nouchka; Fewest votes to save	Basiri; Fewest votes to save	Doriana; Fewest votes to save	Sabeau; Fewest votes to save	Ronahi; Fewest votes to save	Dilano; Fewest votes to save	Danny; Fewest votes to save	Karen; Fewest votes to save	Tom; Fewest votes to save	Ashley; Fewest votes to save	Jimmy; Fewest votes to save	Glenn; Most votes to win	
Source																	

=== Notes ===
- ^1: Because Sonja & Tom got Basiri's locker with the nomination in it, they faced eviction.
- ^2: Housemates had to nominate two duos in duo.
- ^3: Tyron was saved by the fans during fan week from nomination.
