= Oscar van den Eynde de Rivieren =

Belgian politician (1864–1950)

Jonkheer Oscar Jean Henri van den Eynde de Rivieren

Member of the Chamber of Representatives
- In office 1919–1932

Personal details
- Born: 5 April 1864 Aarschot, Belgium
- Died: 2 February 1950 (aged 85) Gelrode, Belgium
- Citizenship: Belgium
- Party: Catholic Party

Jhr. Oscar Jean Henri van den Eynde de Rivieren (5 April 1864 – 2 February 1950) was a Belgian nobleman, parliamentarian and mayor.

== Life course ==
Van den Eynde was a son of Auguste van den Eynde, provincial councilor of Brabant, and of Léonie Dauw. He married Marguerite van der Belen (1868–1950). They had three daughters and a son, Jules van den Eynde (1891–1975), who became Advocate General at the Brussels Court of Appeal.

Oscar obtained his doctorate in agricultural engineering from the Catholic University of Leuven.

He became a municipal councilor (1895) and mayor (1896) of Gelrode.

From 1902 to 1919 he was a provincial councilor for the province of Brabant. In 1919 he was elected as a Catholic Member of Parliament for the district of Leuven and held this mandate until 1932.

== Peerage ==
In 1929 he obtained permission to add de Rivieren to the family name for him and his descendants. The same year he was included in the Belgian hereditary nobility.

He became the owner of the Rivieren domain and built a new castle there in 1880.
