= Big Brother 2023 (Dutch and Belgian TV series) =

- Season 3
- Presented by: Geraldine Kemper; Tatyana Beloy
- No. of days: 86
- No. of housemates: 16
- Winner: Bart Vandenbroek
- Runner-up: Jason Glas
- No. of episodes: 72

Release
- Original network: Netherlands; RTL 5; RTL 4 (Premiere); Belgium; Play4
- Original release: 9 January – 1 April 2023

Season chronology
- ← Previous; Series 2022 Next → Series 2024

Big Brother 2023 is the third cooperation season of the Dutch and Belgian version of Big Brother. It is the ninth regular version of Big Brother in both Belgium and the Netherlands. The show is broadcast on RTL 5 in the Netherlands and Play4 in Belgium beginning on 9 January 2023. Live streams are available 24/7 on Videoland for Dutch viewers and on GoPlay.be and Telenet for Belgian viewers.

In August 2022, there was an announcement of the new season and a call for new housemates. The start and house of the season was revealed at the beginning of January 2023.

Geraldine Kemper returned as host of the show. Tatyana Beloy was announced as the new Belgian host.

The house of the previous seasons remained but was again restyled. It was intended to be very colorful. The shop of the previous season was changed into the Wall. A safe was also added. In the bathroom the bath was removed and replaced by a make-up table. A secret room and outside game area was added. Next to the house a showbuilding was built. The format of the show was also retooled adding the Power of Nomination, Big Brother coins and a jackpot of 100.000 euro at the start.

The eleven first housemates arrived at January 2023. The first episode aired on 9 January 2023. The ratings of the launch were lower than the previous season, having only 356.000 viewers in the Netherlands. The first episode aired on 3 January 2023. Loneliner Jason Glas became very popular. The public arranged a plane with message that flew by. Because the housemates had to play much more individual, there were more tensions and fights. The livestream was even stopped one time. Rob Groenendijk had all the bad luck. The senior of the group of housemates had lots of ailments and was most of the times at the couch. He was visited by a doctor three times, a record. In week 7 he asked to be nominated, but his will was not granted. Because of that Groenendijk decided to leave the house himself. For the first time ever in this cooperation edition an evicted housemate, Danny Volkers, returned to the house after some time as actual housemate, back competing in the game.

The final was on 1 April 2023 and the winner was Bart Vandenbroeck who won the jackpot of €73,338. The final was watched by 368.000 viewers in the Netherlands and 220.560 viewers in Belgium. Broadcoaster RTL 5 called the season a successful one, having more viewers than the previous season.

== Production ==
=== Format ===
Big Brother 2023 followed the same format as the previous seasons of the program. Housemates lived in isolation from the outside world in a custom-built house for a period of 100 days, hoping to be the last one to leave the house as the winner, and walk away with a large cash prize.

==== Concept ====
Producers of the reality show stated this season would be different compared to the other seasons. This was explained during the launch. This season the housemates had to play individually. This was enhanced by introductions of the following new things: - Big Brother coins: each housemate had his own budget of Big Brother coins. Housemates could earn coins by doing tasks and could spend the coins in the Wall. - Power of Nomination: only the winner of the Power of Nomination game would be able to nominate.

The secret room was also added. One housemate a week could gain access to that room by winning the Time Game. That housemate was helped in that room by the Live viewers. By doing the task in the secret room, the housemates were ranked. At the end there would be a reward for the best player.

=== Broadcasts ===
The first episode was pre-recorded on the evening of 6 January 2023 and simultaneously broadcast on RTL 4 and RTL 5 in the Netherlands, Play4 on Belgium on 9 January 2023. The Daily show aired from Monday to Friday with the live show on Saturday night.

== Housemates ==
Eleven housemates entered the house during the launch. The following weeks five housemates were added.

Name	Age	Occupation	Country	Residence	Day entered	Day exited	Status
Bart Vandenbroek	49	Militaire	Belgium	Itegem	1	86	Winner
Jason Glas	20	Ex E-player	Netherlands	Beverwijk	1	86	Runner-up
Jolien Bosch	29	Nail stylist	Belgium	Hoeselt	10	86	3rd place
Charlotte Denamur	27	Personal assistant & nanny	Belgium	Middelkerke	1	84	Evicted
Lindsey Rademaker-Merion	32	Sales representative & artist	Netherlands	Sittard	1	81	Evicted
Danny Volker	28	Personal trainer	Netherlands	Vinkeveen	58	79	Evicted
Danny Volker	28	Personal trainer	Netherlands	Vinkeveen	1	30	Evicted
Ali Burhan	35	Teacher in training	Belgium	Lommel	1	72	Evicted
Michelangelo Amendola	21	Entrepreneur & F3 driver	Belgium	Genk	1	65	Evicted
Ias Nauwelaerst	22	Window Cleaner	Belgium	Schilde	17	58	Evicted
Chiara Siddu	27	Employer in education	Netherlands	Weert	14	55	Walked
Rob Groenendijk	66	Retiree	Netherlands	Leiderdorp	1	51	Walked
Chayron Herman	33	Truck driver	Netherlands	Waddinxveen	1	44	Evicted
Jacqueline Leijzer	55	Horeca operator	Netherlands	Silvolde	17	37	Evicted
Ilse De Weyer	55	Home caretaker	Belgium	Schriek	11	23	Evicted
Chelsea Ausma	22	Child care worker	Netherlands	Dronten	1	16	Evicted
Judy Proost	34	Beautyspecialist & DJ	Belgium	Burcht	1	9	Evicted

== Twists ==
=== Prize money ===
In this season, the prize money started at €100.000. The prize money would decrease by housemates buying personal items or favors. The prize money could also increase by winning missions.

	Current total amount	What	Result	Increased/decreased
Week 1	€100.000 (Initial)			€0
Week 4	€70,000	Confusion challenge in pairs	Duos: • Bart and Jacqueline / each €5,000; • Chayron and Ias / each €10,000	-€30,000
Week 5	€61,568	Auction	Buyers auction: • Chayron - immunity / €5,000; • Michelangelo - phone call home / €1,500; • Chayron - video message home / €1,000; • Jacqueline - letter from home / €745; • Michelangelo - family photo / €180; • Ali - box of chocolate / €7	-€8,432
Week 6	€66,518	Jackpot challenge - balls	All housemates - one ball fell - €4,950	+€4,950
Week 8	€65,218	Power of nomination game	Jolien: joker - €1,300	-€1,300
Week 11	€64,218	Freeze challenge: Barts daughter	Jolien - €1,000	-€1,000
Week 12	€66,338	Catch table tennis balls	All housemates - €2,120	+€2,120
Week 12	€68,338	Freeze challenge: Barts wife, Charlottes niece, Jasons brother and Joliens sister	All housemates - €2,000	+€2,000
Total	€68,338			

=== Big Brother coins ===
In this season, housemates could earn and spend Big Brother coins. They could earn them by succeeding in tasks and spend them in the newly shopping room, the Wall. Each housemate had his wallet of coins.

Housemates from The Netherlands
Housemates from Belgium

	Week 1	Week 2	Week 3	Week 4	Week 5	Week 6	Week 7	Week 8	Week 9	Week 10	Week 11	Week 12	
	Week 1	Week 2	Week 3	Week 4	Week 5	Week 6	Week 7	Week 8	Week 9	Week 10	Week 11	Day 81	Day 83
Bart	7	12	0	2	4	4	14	29	31		12		0
Jason	7	14	2	4	5	3	27	27	16		40		14
Jolien	Not in House	8	0	1	9	6	11	5	7		3		0
Charlotte	2	16	35	30	29	22	26	24	19		15		1
Lindsey	11	23	0	6	7	6	7	4	0		21		Evicted (Day 81)
Danny	17	17	14	12	Evicted (Day 30)				0	0	0	Evicted (Day 79)	
Ali	4	7	2	2	19	0	0	0	0	1	Evicted (Day 72)		
Michelangelo	6	9	13	14	27	20	31	31	28	Evicted (Day 65)			
Ias	Not in House		4	1	5	0	0	0	Evicted (Day 58)				
Chiara	Not in House	3	1	1	8	2	4	Walked (Day 55)					
Rob	0	18	17	10	17	4	9	Walked (Day 51)					
Chayron	16	19	0	2	5	0	Evicted (Day 44)						
Jacqueline	Not in House		1	1	3	Evicted (Day 37)							
Ilse	Not in House	4	0	Evicted (Day 23)									
Chelsea	12	14	Evicted (Day 16)										
Judy	11	Evicted (Day 9)											

In the last week, the remaining housemates could spend their coins at their campaign to win. Jason Glas was the only housemate who had coins left during the final, still having 11 coins.

=== Secret room challenge ===
In this season, a secret room was added. Each week one housemate could gain access to the room. That housemate had to choose an object which would lead to that housemates mission. Housemates gained points for the secret room challenge.

	Housemate	Symbol	What	Result	Points
Week 1	Danny	weight	distribute four weights on a scale in a glass container with foam	✓	1
Week 2	Chelsea	music note	play a melody using tree instruments	✗	0
Week 3	Bart	labyrinth	bring balls in a labyrinth while hanging	✓	1
Week 4	Ali	mirror	put laser into lamps sensor by moving blocks	✓	1
Week 5	Jason	book	dismantle bomb	✓	1
Week 5	Michelangelo	bomb	dismantle bomb	✓	1
Week 6	Ali	lock	gain the key and escape the boobytraps	✓	1
Week 7	Jason	tetris	riddle about housemates	✗	0
Week 8	Ali	water drop	obtain key by transferring water with garden hose	✗	0
Week 9	Jolien	water drop	obtain key by transferring water with garden hose	✓	1
Week 9	Michelangelo	tetris	riddle about housemates	✗	0
Week 10	Lindsey	music note	play a melody using tree instruments	✓	1
Week 10	Charlotte	scale	balance personal objects from housemates	✓	1
Week 11	Lindsey	tetris	riddle about housemates	✗	0

Since Ali was evicted, each remaining housemate had won 1 secret room game: Bart, Charlotte, Jason, Jolien and Lindsey. The housemates were ranked in time they finished their secret room challenge, in which order they played the final secret room challenge. In that game there were 6 doors. Behind every door there was a secret.

=== Power of nomination ===
New this season, was the Power of nomination. Housemates could gain this power by winning an assignment. With this power, this housemate or housemates could be the only ones to nominate other housemates.

=== Big Brother pins ===
In addition to last season's silver immunity pin, there were now gold-colored pins for the residents with Power of nomination and red-colored nomination pins for the nominated residents.

== Weekly summary ==
The main events in the Big Brother house are summarised in the table below.

Week 1
On Day 1, Judy got a secret mission before the residents entered the house. She had to place personal items from her inmates in The Wall. If her inmates bought this, Judy would earn the coins paid. The first 11 housemates - Ali, Bart, Charlotte, Chayron, Chelsea, Danny, Jason, Judy, Lindsey, Michelangelo and Rob entered the house. The housemates are given 7 coins. If they want their suitcase with them, they must pay 5 coins for it. Chelsea, Judy, Danny, Charlotte, Lindsey & Rob choose to take their suitcase and pay 5 coins each.

Chelsea was given a secret mission. She had to guess by the end of the week which of her inmates had filled The Wall. Chelsea was wrong at the end of the week. The housemates had to delegate someone to go to a secret room. This was Jason. He went to the key room where he had to find the right key in a key mountain to open suitcases. The last suitcase contained cards for two nominations and three exemptions and a red button.

On Day 3: when Jason pushed the red button on day he was allowed to return to the house after 36h. But he first had to go to the Game Room where he could help his fellow inmates to one of the three suitcases. He led as follows: - Ali to an exemption - Bart to an exemption - Charlotte to an advantage in the Power of Nomination game - Chayron to 10 coins - Chelsea to 10 coins - Danny to 10 coins - Judy to a nomination - Lindsey to 10 coins - Michelangelo to a benefit in the Power of Nomination game - Rob to a disadvantage in the Power of Nomination game

On Day 4: Power of Nomination game: if a resident can roll a ball over a bar of boards, they can cut one of the other participants' strings. The last resident who has a string attached to the Power of Nomination token wins. This was * Chayron.

On Day 5: Time Game: residents must find letters as quickly as possible through a maze. Danny wins and gains access to the Secret room as a result.

On Day 6: Secret Room: Danny had to choose between some symbols, and chose the weight symbol. He puzzle was to distribute four weights on a scale in a glass container with foam. Danny won 1 point and 7 coins.

On Day 7, Judy was nominated by Jason's earlier assignment. Jason and Rob were nominated by Chayron. Jason, Judy and Rob were nominated and faced the public vote.

On Day 9, Judy became the first housemate to be evicted. She gave her 11 coins to Rob.

Week 2 - Money week
On Day 9: Week Task. Big Brother is curious if the residents already know his house well. When he shows a picture from one of his cameras, the residents must stand in front of this camera in a certain time after which a picture is taken. If a residents was on it with two eyes and mouth, that housemate won 1 coin.

Housemates must choose between a rose or a blue light. One light represents 10 coins, the other represents participation in the Power of Nomination game. Only 5 bulbs of each color may be lit. Bart, Chayron, Chelsea, Danny & Jason choose the Power of Nomination participation. Ali, Charlotte, Lindsey, Michelangelo and Rob for the coins.

On Day 10, Time Game: residents needed to discover as many differences as possible on two drawings of the house. Chelsea won. Jolien entered the house.

Lindsey bought a cassette from The Wall. It was a morsecode of 4 letters.

On Day 11, housemates celebrated Chayrons birthday.

The Hunger Game was played: the housemates had to play a life size Doctor Bibber - replaced by a fridge. Jolien had to take objects out of the fridge while hanging en being controlled by the other housemates. Jolien won two food packages.

Danny and Lindsey had 15 min to cut out an object out of an ice cube. They did it and discovered a morse code for Lindsey's cassette. Encoded it was "Ilse". The name of the new housemate. Ilse entered the house

On Day 12: Michelangelo bought a Power of Nomination ticket for 15 coins. He won the Power of Nomination game.

On Day 13: Secret Room: Chelsea chose the music note symbol. Her puzzle was to play a melody using tree instruments. She failed.

Chayron got a secret mission. To help new housemate Chiara enter the house secretly. He could ask help of one other housemate, this was Michelangelo. They succeeded anc Chiara entered the house on Day 14

Charlotte, Chelsea and Danny were nominated by Michelangelo. They faced the public vote.

On Day 16, Chelsea became the second housemate to be evicted. She gave her 15 coins to Charlotte.

Week 3 - Battle week
On Day 16 housemates are divided in two teams. Team Green is Ali, Charlotte, Chiara, Danny, Michelangelo and Rob. Team Pink is Bart, Chayron, Ilse, Jason, Jolien and Lindsey. Ias and Jacqueline entered the secret Captain's room. On Day 17Ias became captain of Team Green. Jacqueline became captain of Team Pink. Bart and Chiara are chosen by their captains to defend their teams. They have to solve a puzzle door. Bart wins so Team Pink wins. Team Green and its captain Ias has to sleep outside. Because of the freezing cold, they could sleep in the gameroom.

On Day 18: Chayron and Rob are chosen by their captains to defend their teams. They have to solve a big puzzle made out of blocks on columns. Rob wins so Team Greens wins. Each member of Team Pink loses all their individual coins. Danny and Jason were chosen by their captains to defend their teams. They have to catch all balls in their team color. They are helped by Ali and Lindsey. Danny wins with 101 green balls, while Jason has 94 pink balls. Team Green wins pizza.

On Day 19: Ias and Jacqueline entered the house. the Team captains could lose one member of their team. Ias chose Chiara. Jacqueline chose Ilse. Chiara became a member of Team Pink and Ilse became a member of Team Green. The two teams battled each other in where poles couldn't touch rings. Team Pinks wins and were able to nominate each member of Team Green.

On Day 20: Secret Room: Bart chose the labyrinth symbol. He had to bring balls in a labyrinth while hanging. He won.

On Day 21, Danny, Ilse and Roby were nominated by Team Pink. They faced the public vote. On Day 22: Ali, Chayron, Danny, Ias and Michelangelo put out a dragqueen show. On Day 23, Ilse became the third housemate to be evicted. She had 0 coins.

Week 4 - Confusion week
On Day 23, Jason received the most nominations from all housemates at the start of confusion week. He had to leave the house immediately after receiving the most nominations but secretly went to the control room. Fake Brother: Jason received in the control room three missions to give at other housemates. If three succeeded, he would lose his nomination. If not, he would keep his nomination. He chose Charlotte, Danny and Michelangelo to these secret missions.

On Day 24: Ias and Michelangelo bought a game ticket for 3 coins. Danny and Charlotte bought a ticket for 2 coins. Ali and Lindsay bought a ticket for 1 coin. Each housemate with a ticket played a game with water and tubes. Charlotte and Lindsey won and won 10 coins. They also won the Power of nomination for one. By doing the rock - paper -scissors game, Charlotte won.

On Day 25: the hunger game: the house was filled with wires. The housemates had 2,5 hours to guess how long the wire was. They guessed 36.680 meters but it was 39.270 meters. They lost a luxiury food.

On Day 26: the confusion game. The housemates in pairs had to play a game involving poles and money and nomination prizes. Bart & Jacqueline both won 5.000 euros from the jackpot. Chiara and Jolien won the power of nomination. Chayron and Ias both won 10.000 euros from the jackpot.

On Day 27: Jason returned to the house. He told the housemates he was surprised about the comments other housemates had made about him. Ali played the secret room game and chose the mirror symbol.

On Day 28, Danny, Jason and Michelangelo were nominated by Charlotte, Chiara and Jolien. They faced the public vote. On Day 29, Ali and Rob had a fight about wet towels. On Day 29, Ias' birthday was celebrated. Ali and Rob had a fight about wet towels. On Day 30, Jason had a surprise when a plane flew over the garden with a message for him. Danny became the fourth housemate to be evicted.

Week 5 - Dilemma week
On Day 30, each housemate had to name in the gameroom one housemate they wanted to nominate. The one with the most nominations was Rob.

On Day 31: a dilemma game starts in the garden. There are three buttons. Hitting the button with the coin, gave 1 coin. Hitting the button with 3 coins, gave 3 coins. Hitting the button with a question mark, gave that housemate the opportunity to take something from the Wall.

The hunger game: the housemates had to choose an object to bring a balloon to a certain spot. 4 teams had to succeed. They won sushi. On Day 32: the housemates had to choose their weekly basics.

The housemates had an auction where they could buy a personal thing from the jackpot. Ali bought chocolate for 7 EUR. Jacqueline bought a family letter for 745 EUR. Michelangelo bought a family photo for 180 EUR and a phone call for 1.500 EUR. Chayron bought a video message for 1.000 EUR and immunity for 5.000 EUR.

On Day 33: the power of nomination game. They had to prick a balloon with an object they could choose. Ali won. On Day 34: Jason and Michelangelo were chosen by the public to play the secret room game. They had to dismantle a bomb. They succeeded

On Day 35, the housemates play a music quiz. Jacqueline and Jason were nominated by Ali. Jacqueline, Jason and Rob faced the public vote. On Day 37, Jacqueline became the fifth housemate to be evicted. She had one coid and gave it to Chiara and gave her can with sand to Bart.

Week 6 - All or nothing week
On Day 37, the housemates won an après-ski party by recreating a photo in the snow.

On Day 38, Rob got up with heavy pain. The housemates had to go one by one to the gameroom and give a half of a coin, immunity or nomination to another housemates without seeing their own object. If at the end a housemates had two halves of the same, the housemate could gain that object. But before that each housemate could choose if he would accept or deny the choice of the other housemates. Charlotte accepted and won immunity. Chiara denied it and didn't get the nomination at her name. No other housemate has two same halves. The jackpot challenge started. Housemates had to keep balls, with a worth of 25EUR each, into a bin. They won at the end of the week and won 5.000 EUR for the jackpot.

On Day 39, housemates had to freeze when Big Brother told them too. Joliens dog entered the house but she remained silent. They won warm water. Charlotte, Jason, Jolien and Lindsey won a balance game and won a Valentine diner. The Valentine dinner was in the gameroom and the three housemates received cards from the public. Each housemate had to choose an envelope in the Diary room. The envelope could be empty but also contain a ticket to the power of nomination game or a ticket to the secret room.

On Day 40: Bart, Chayron, Chiara, Ias, Lindsey and Michelangelo played the game of power of nomination. Each housemate had a wip with his photo and a can of sand. If the photo fell, the housemate had to lose the game. Bart could use Jacquelin's can. He won. On Day 41: the Secret Room: Ali chose the lock. He is able to gain the key and escape the boobytraps.

On Day 42, Ali, Chayron and Lindsey were nominated by Bart. They faced the public vote. The other housemates who were not nominated could gain immunity for the next week but they would be nominated for this week too. No one accepted the offer. On Day 44, Chayron became the sixth housemate to be evicted. He had 0 coins.

Week 7 - Fan week
On Day 44, the housemates heard audio fragments of their relatives.

On Day 45, housemates played a card game to win coins but also a ticket to the fan room. Jolien won. That evening she visited the fan room. She saw opinions at social media of the public about the housemates, cards for the housemates and chose a letter and film fragment of fans. She could also see rankings of the public about the honesty, tactics and acceptance in the group of the housemates.

On Day 46, housemates had a new freeze game. Michelangelo's grandmother entered with spaghetti. Chiara became very emotional because she thought of her own grandmother and talked to the woman. The game failed. Feeling bad about it, Chiara gave Michelangelo a coin for the ticket to the fan room in the Wall. Michelangelo visited the fan room later that day. He chose a phone call from a friend. Chiara, Jason and Michelangelo win a game to participate the game to win the power of nomination. That evening, housemates had to dress themselves for carnaval. Wolter Kroes came by and sang Ik heb de hele nacht liggen dromen, Robs favorite.

On Day 47: the housemates waked up in a house with only cardboard furniture. Messages of fans were written on the cardboards. Rob asked to be nominated so he can leave the house. Chiara, Jason and Michelangelo played the power of nomination game and received help from Chiara's father, Jasons friend and Michelangelo's brother in law. They had to move pyramids of cardboard. Michelangelo won the power of nomination game.

Jason went to the secret room on Day 48. The fans chose a riddle for him. The riddle was about the other housemates. Jason failed to solve it.

On Day 49, the normal furniture returned. Ali, Charlotte and Lindsey were nominated by Michelangelo. They faced the public vote. On Day 51, Rob decided to leave the house because of the ongoing physical pain he endured. He was the seventh housemate to leave the house. Charlotte, who had the least votes of the public, was automatically nominated for the following week.

Week 8 - Talent week
On Day 51, the Big Brother theatre is revealed to the housemates in the game room. It's opened by ex-housemates Chelsea who sing a song. The acts of the week were as following: Bart & Chiara did a magic show, Charlotte & Lindsey sang. Ias & Jason rapped, Jolien & Michelangelo twerked, and Ali would did stand-up-comedy.

On Day 52 housemates had to choose one housemate with human knowledge, this was Bart. Bart had to divide the housemates in pairs and decide what reward they would win. The duo's had to find the word oplossing with their tongues. Charlotte & Lindsey won a letter to their relatives. Chiara & Jolien won a personal object, for Chiara her sisters ring and for Jolien a photo of her fiancée. Ias & Michelangelo won an advantage with the power of nomination game. In The Wall are tickets for talent tasks. Ali buys a ticket to juggle with a soccer ball 30 times. Ali asked this to make more difficult and succeeded in doing it 100 times. Michelangelo bought a ticket to build a parcour with dominoes. He failed. Jolien received a secret mission to get Jolien to brush her teeth on an exact time the next morning. That evening Ali gave his solo comedy performance.

On Day 53, housemates had a new freeze game. Charlottes mother appeared behind the mirror where Charlotte was brushing her teeth. Charlotte and Jolien won a beauty package. Ali won entrance to the secret room. Charlotte and Lindsey performed at the theatre the next evening and sang a song about the housemates. Chiara was upset because they portrayed her as a snake. Ias and Jason also rapped. Jason, who has a crush at Chiara, asked her about her feelings. Chiara made it clear she thought the age difference was too big. On Day 54 Jason won the power of nomination. Jolien bought a joker from the jackpot.

On Day 55, Chiara left the house for private reasons. She was the eighth person to leave the house. She gave her 4 coins to Jolien. It was the last evening of the talent shows. On Day 56, Charlotte and Lindsey were announced the winners of the talent show - giving Lindsey immunity and Charlotte losing her nomination. Ali went to the secret room but failed the mission. Ali, Jolien and Ias were nominated by Jason. They faced the public vote.

On Day 57, the public was able to vote for the return of one of the ex-housemates from the Netherlands following Chiara's depart. The audience could choose between Chayron, Chelsea and Danny. On Day 58, Ias became the seventh housemate to be evicted and the ninth housemate to leave the house. Danny had the publics vote to return to the house and entered immediately.

Week 9 - Fight for your power week
On Day 58, the housemates had to choose on moving objects, deciding if they would join the think of do group. Charlotte, Danny, Jolien and Lindsey were the think group and Ali, Bart, Jason and Michelangelo the do group. They had to take place on a lifesize Game of the Goose board game by their success rate of the shooting game and answer questions of the tile they were standing on. Winning the Game of Goose would give power of nomination.

On Day 59 the housemates didn't receive weekly basics but had to form duos to make dinner each night. The do-group had to hold a rope as long as possible. Jason lost and had to leave the Game of Goose. The others of the group moved forward on the game. The think-group had to play a lifesize chess game. Charlotte lost and left the Game of Goose while the others moved forward. Bart and Ali got a secret mission to make a birthday cake for Charlotte. Charlotte and Jolien prepared a pasta diner and did it restaurant themed.

On Day 60, Charlotte's birthday was celebrated. Jolien had to leave the think group by losing a puzzle and Michelangelo the do group by losing a swing exercise. Bart & Danny made hamburgers and did it country themed. Big Brother throwed a little party for Charlotte's birthday.

On Day 61, the last ones at the Game of Goose board had to throw dices and solve riddles drawn, explained or depicted by fans. Bart & Danny were the winners the Game of Goose board. They played a labyrinth game with tubes in the air. Danny won and got the power of nomination. Jason and Michelangelo cooked pita. Jolien played the game in the secret room, chose the water drop and won. On Day 62, Michelangelo played the secret room game but failed. Ali and Lindsey cooked Mexican style. On Day 63, Bart, Jason and Michelangelo were nominated by Danny. They faced the public vote. On Day 65, a plane with the banner Ali Finali flew by for Ali. Michelangelo became the eighth housemate to be evicted and the tenth housemate to leave the house. He gave his coins to Jason.

Week 10 - Back in time week
On Day 65, the housemates had to choose a color of a lightning ball: pink= 10 coins, red = entrance to the picture room, blue = entrance to the secret room, green = nothing. After discussing Ali got pink, Bart got red, Charlotte & Lindsey blue and Danny, Jason & Jolien green. On Day 66, Bart went to the picture room which was filled with pictures of the housemates' past and of fans. The other housemates had to form duos (Ali & Charlotte, Jason & Jolien and Danny & Lindsey) and recognize duos of tiles with objects in a darkened game room. Succeeding in finding a duo, meant giving a hint at Bart to find a picture. Each duo found 1 duo of tiles so Bart got three hints and found three pictures. He was allowed to take his wedding picture into the house. By finding three pictures he was allowed to take three housemates with him to the Big Brother Museum - which were Ali, Jason and Jolien. The game room was decorated as a museum with pictures and objects of that season. The housemates got also bubbles and appetizers.

On Day 67, housemates had a jackpot challenge in the game room. Each housemate that received the hourglass to choose between money from the jackpot (500 EUR) or a secret box. Bart & Ali chose the money but Lindsey chose the box, meaning the earned 1.000 EUR for the jackpot was lost. In the box was a nomination that Lindsey had to give, she nominated Jason. On Day 68, the power of nomination game is won by Charlotte. Each housemate receives a complain by phone from a viewer. Lindsey played the secret room challenge and chose the music note. She succeeded. On Day 69, Charlotte played the secret room challenge and chose the scale. She won the challenge in a record time.

On Day 70, Ali and Bart were nominated by Charlotte. They, and Jason, faced the public vote. On Day 72, Ali became the ninth housemate to be evicted and the eleventh housemate to leave the house. He gave his 1 coin to Danny.

Week 11 - Back to reality week
On Day 72, viewed the Big Brother-journal with news and videos from their families and friends. They had to choose one housemate who could play the last secret room challenge. By pulling straws it was decided this was Lindsay, to dismay of Jason. On Day 73, housemates received dayla basics instead of wekkly basics, that day they were chosen by Joliens family. Each day the housemates were awakened by the voice of one of the winners and housemates of the previous seasons. Each housemate had to play a guessing game in the gameroom and had to guess with relative of another housemate was in the surprise box, by using printed questions. Jolien was the fastest housemate and she could unwrap her surprise box, her mother. Jolien was able to hug her mother. Lindsey played the last secret room challenge, the tetris symbol, which hadn't been resolved. Lindsey was a few seconds too late. That night Big Brother showed housemates the ranking for the secret room final game, showing Charlotte at place 1 because she solved her secret room challenge the fastest. Jason and Jolien made a deal to not nominate each other. On Day 74, housemates played the final secret room game. Charlotte won a ticket to the final week, Jolien won an advantage for the nominations, Lindsey won 25 coins, Bart won a phone call home, Jason got nothing and Danny lost his only coin.

There was a new freeze game, with Barts daughter. Seeing Bart emotional, Jolien started talking and breaking the freeze game and telling Bart to hug his daughter. The housemates could nominate one of them, this was Lindsey. The public could nominate two other housemates.

On Day 77, Danny & Jolien were nominated by the public. Lindsey was already nominated by the audience. They, and Jason, faced the public vote. On Day 78, Danny became the tenth housemate to be evicted and he had to leave the house for a second time.

Week 12 - Only one winner week
On Day 78, the final week started. While the five remaining housemates were in the gameroom, ex-housemates Chayron, Chelsea and Judy decorated the house. The last housemates got a party. On Day 80, ex-housemates Ilse and Jacqueline secretly hide countless table tennis balls in the house. The housemates have to find them and bring them in a tube on time for the jackpot. Ex-housemate Rob counted the balls in secret in the gameroom. On Day 81, the housemates heard that one of them would leave today. Lindsey became the eleventh housemate to be evicted by the public. She gave her 8 coins to Charlotte. The last four housemates were able to make promotion for themselves in order to win the season. In exchange they had to use their coins. Jolien could only make a selfcreated poster, Charlotte a blackwhite film and Bart and Jason each a colored film.

On Day 82, ex-housemates Chiara and Michelangelo made a secret visit to the house and prepared breakfast for the last housemates. There's a new freeze challenge: Charlotte's niece and Barts wife come by to make promotion right before their relative. That evening, there's another freeze by Jasons brother and Joliens sister. On Day 83, the secret missions of the ex-housemates is showed at the last housemates. On Day 84, Charlotte became the twelfth housemate to be evicted by the public. She gave her last coin to Jolien.

Bart, Jason and Jolien were the finalists. On Day 85, they were able to choose their clothes for the final in the secret room that was changed in a clothing shop. On Day 86, the finalists have unlimited warm water to shower for the first time. Jolien is the first one to leave the house, having the third place. Bart was announced as the winner, leaving Jason as the runner-up.

== Episodes ==
No. overall	No. in season	Title	Day(s)	Original release date
Week 1 - Launch week
155	1	"Episode 1 - Launch"	Day 1–2	January 9, 2023
156	2	"Episode 2"	Day 2-3	January 10, 2023
157	3	"Episode 3"	Day 3-4	January 11, 2023
158	4	"Episode 4"	Day 4-6	January 12, 2023
159	5	"Episode 5"	Day 6-7	January 13, 2023
160	6	"Episode 6"	Day 7-9 & Live Show 1	January 14, 2023
Week 2 - Money week
161	7	"Episode 7"	Day 9-10	January 16, 2023
162	8	"Episode 8"	Day 10-11	January 17, 2023
163	9	"Episode 9"	Day 11-12	January 18, 2023
164	10	"Episode 10"	Day 12-13	January 19, 2023
165	11	"Episode 11"	Day 13-14	January 20, 2023
166	12	"Episode 12"	Day 14-16 & Live Show 2	January 21, 2023
Week 3 - Battle week
167	13	"Episode 13"	Day 16-17	January 23, 2023
168	14	"Episode 18"	Day 17-18	January 24, 2023
169	15	"Episode 15"	Day 18-19	January 25, 2023
170	16	"Episode 16"	Day 19-20	January 26, 2023
171	17	"Episode 17"	Day 20-21	January 27, 2023
172	18	"Episode 18"	Day 21-23 & Live Show 3	January 28, 2023
Week 4 - Confusion week
173	19	"Episode 19"	Day 23-24	January 30, 2023
174	20	"Episode 20"	Day 24-25	January 31, 2023
175	21	"Episode 21"	Day 25-26	February 1, 2023
176	22	"Episode 22"	Day 26-27	February 2, 2023
177	23	"Episode 23"	Day 27-28	February 3, 2023
178	24	"Episode 24"	Day 28-30 & Live Show 4	February 4, 2023
Week 5 - Dilemma week
179	25	"Episode 25"	Day 30-31	February 6, 2023
180	26	"Episode 26"	Day 31-32	February 7, 2023
181	27	"Episode 27"	Day 32-33	February 8, 2023
182	28	"Episode 28"	Day 33-34	February 9, 2023
183	29	"Episode 29"	Day 34-35	February 10, 2023
184	30	"Episode 30"	Day 35-37 & Live Show 5	February 11, 2023
Week 6 - All or nothing week
185	31	"Episode 31"	Day 37-38	February 13, 2023
186	32	"Episode 32"	Day 38-39	February 14, 2023
187	33	"Episode 33"	Day 39-40	February 15, 2023
188	34	"Episode 34"	Day 40-41	February 16, 2023
189	35	"Episode 35"	Day 41-42	February 17, 2023
190	36	"Episode 36"	Day 42-44 & Live Show 6	February 18, 2023
Week 7 - Fan week
191	37	"Episode 37"	Day 44-45	February 20, 2023
192	38	"Episode 38"	Day 45-46	February 21, 2023
193	39	"Episode 39"	Day 46-47	February 22, 2023
194	40	"Episode 40"	Day 47-48	February 23, 2023
195	41	"Episode 41"	Day 48-49	February 24, 2023
196	42	"Episode 42"	Day 49-51 & Live Show 7	February 25, 2023
Week 8 - Talent week
197	43	"Episode 43"	Day 51-52	February 27, 2023
198	44	"Episode 44"	Day 52-53	February 28, 2023
199	45	"Episode 45"	Day 53-54	March 1, 2023
200	46	"Episode 46"	Day 54-55	March 2, 2023
201	47	"Episode 47"	Day 55-56	March 3, 2023
202	48	"Episode 48"	Day 56-58 & Live Show 8	March 4, 2023
Week 9 - Fight for your power week
203	49	"Episode 49"	Day 58-59	March 6, 2023
204	50	"Episode 50"	Day 59-60	March 7, 2023
205	51	"Episode 51"	Day 60-61	March 8, 2023
206	52	"Episode 52"	Day 61-62	March 9, 2023
207	53	"Episode 53"	Day 62-63	March 10, 2023
208	54	"Episode 54"	Day 63-65 & Live Show 9	March 11, 2023
Week 10 - Back in time week
209	55	"Episode 55"	Day 65-66	March 13, 2023
210	56	"Episode 56"	Day 66-67	March 14, 2023
211	57	"Episode 57"	Day 67-68	March 15, 2023
212	58	"Episode 58"	Day 68-69	March 16, 2023
213	59	"Episode 59"	Day 69-70	March 17, 2023
214	60	"Episode 60"	Day 70-72 & Live Show 10	March 18, 2023
Week 11 - Back to reality week
215	61	"Episode 61"	Day 72-73	March 20, 2023
216	62	"Episode 62"	Day 73-74	March 21, 2023
217	63	"Episode 63"	Day 74-75	March 22, 2023
218	64	"Episode 64"	Day 75-76	March 23, 2023
219	65	"Episode 65"	Day 76-77	March 24, 2023
220	66	"Episode 66"	Day 77-79 & Live Show 11	March 25, 2023
Week 12 - Only one winner week
221	67	"Episode 67"	Day 79-80	March 27, 2023
222	68	"Episode 68"	Day 80-81	March 28, 2023
223	69	"Episode 69"	Day 81-82	March 29, 2023
224	70	"Episode 70"	Day 82-83	March 30, 2023
225	71	"Episode 71"	Day 83-84	March 31, 2023
226	72	"Episode 72"	Day 84-86 & Final	April 1, 2023

== Nominations table ==
Housemates from The Netherlands
Housemates from Belgium

	Week 1	Week 2	Week 3	Week 4		Week 5		Week 6	Week 7	Week 8	Week 9	Week 10		Week 11	Week 12			
	Week 1	Week 2	Week 3	Confusion nominations	Nominations	Dilemma nominations	Nominations	Week 6	Week 7	Week 8	Week 9	Hourglass nomination	Nominations	Week 11	Day 81	Day 83	Final	
Bart	No; Nominations	No; Nominations	Charlotte; Danny; Ilse	Jason	No; Nominations	Chayron	No; Nominations	Ali; Chayron; Lindsey	No; Nominations	No; Nominations	Nominated	No; Nominations	Nominated	Lindsey	No; Nominations	No; Nominations	Winner (Day 86)	
Jason	Nominated	No; Nominations	Danny; Ilse; Rob	Jacqueline	Nominated	Jacqueline	Nominated	No; Nominations	No; Nominations	Ali; Ias; Jolien	Nominated	Nominated	Nominated	Lindsey	No; Nominations	No; Nominations	Runner-Up (Day 86)	
Jolien	Not in House	Exempt	Danny; Michelangelo; Rob	Jason	Danny; Michelangelo	Chayron	No; Nominations	No; Nominations	No; Nominations	Nominated	No; Nominations	No; Nominations	No; Nominations	Lindsey	No; Nominations	No; Nominations	Third Place (Day 86)	
Charlotte	No; Nominations	Nominated	No; Nominations	Chiara	Danny; Michelangelo	Rob	No; Nominations	No; Nominations	Nominated	No; Nominations	No; Nominations	No; Nominations	Ali; Bart	No; Nominations	No; Nominations	No; Nominations	Evicted (Day 84)	
Lindsey	No; Nominations	No; Nominations	Ali; Ilse; Rob	Jason	No; Nominations	Rob	No; Nominations	Nominated	Nominated	No; Nominations	No; Nominations	Jason	No; Nominations	Jason	No; Nominations	Evicted (Day 81)		
Danny	No; Nominations	Nominated	Nominated	Michelangelo	Nominated	Evicted (Day 30)					Bart; Jason; Michelangelo	No; Nominations	No; Nominations	Jason	Evicted (Day 79)			
Ali	No; Nominations	No; Nominations	No; Nominations	Michelangelo	No; Nominations	Rob	Jacqueline; Jason	Nominated	Nominated	Nominated	No; Nominations	No; Nominations	Nominated	Evicted (Day 72)				
Michelangelo	No; Nominations	Charlotte; Chelsea; Danny	No; Nominations	Charlotte	Nominated	Ias	No; Nominations	No; Nominations	Ali; Charlotte; Lindsey	No; Nominations	Nominated	Evicted (Day 65)						
Ias	Not in House		Exempt	Jason	No; Nominations	Jacqueline	No; Nominations	No; Nominations	No; Nominations	Nominated	Evicted (Day 58)							
Chiara	Not in House		Charlotte; Ilse; Rob	Jason	Danny; Michelangelo	?	No; Nominations	No; Nominations	No; Nominations	Walked (Day 55)								
Rob	Nominated	No; Nominations	Nominated	Jason	No; Nominations	Ali	Nominated	No; Nominations	No; Nominations	Walked (Day 51)								
Chayron	Jason; Rob	No; Nominations	Ilse; Michelangelo; Rob	Jason	No; Nominations	?	No; Nominations	Nominated	Evicted (Day 44)									
Jacqueline	Not in House		Exempt	Jason	No; Nominations	Jason	Nominated	Evicted (Day 37)										
Ilse	Not in House	Exempt	Nominated	Evicted (Day 23)														
Chelsea	No; Nominations	Nominated	Evicted (Day 16)															
Judy	Nominated	Evicted (Day 9)																
Notes	1		3	4	5	6			7	8		9						
Source																		
Power of Nomination	Chayron	Michelangelo	Team Pink	All housemates	Charlotte; Chiara; Jolien	All housemates	Ali	Bart	Michelangelo	Jason	Danny	Lindsey	Charlotte	Bart; Danny; Jason; Jolien; Lindsey	none			
Immunity winner	Ali; Bart	none	Bart; Chayron; Chiara; Jason; Jolien; Lindsey	none			Chayron; Michelangelo	Charlotte	none	Lindsey	none			Charlotte	none			
Against public vote	Jason; Judy; Rob	Charlotte; Chelsea; Danny	Danny; Ilse; Rob	none	Danny; Jason; Michelangelo	Rob	Jacqueline; Jason; Rob	Ali; Chayron; Lindsey	Ali; Charlotte; Lindsey	Ali; Ias; Jolien	Bart; Jason; Michelangelo	Jason	Ali; Bart; Jason	Danny; Jolien; Lindsey	Bart; Charlotte; Jason; Jolien; Lindsey	Bart; Charlotte; Jason; Jolien	Bart; Jason; Jolien	
Walked	none								Rob	Chiara	none							
Evicted	Judy; Fewest votes to save	Chelsea; Fewest votes to save	Ilse; Fewest votes to save	Jason; Most nominations	Danny; Fewest votes to save	Rob; Most nominations	Jacqueline; Fewest votes to save	Chayron; Fewest votes to save	Charlotte; Fewest votes to save	Ias; Fewest votes to save	Michelangelo; Fewest votes to save	Jason; Nominated	Ali; Fewest votes to save	Danny; Fewest votes to save	Lindsey; Fewest votes to save	Charlotte; Fewest votes to save	Jolien; Fewest votes to win	Jason; Fewest votes to win
Evicted	Judy; Fewest votes to save	Chelsea; Fewest votes to save	Ilse; Fewest votes to save	Jason; Most nominations	Danny; Fewest votes to save	Rob; Most nominations	Jacqueline; Fewest votes to save	Chayron; Fewest votes to save	Charlotte; Fewest votes to save	Ias; Fewest votes to save	Michelangelo; Fewest votes to save	Jason; Nominated	Ali; Fewest votes to save	Danny; Fewest votes to save	Lindsey; Fewest votes to save	Charlotte; Fewest votes to save	Bart; Most votes to win	
Source																		

=== Notes ===
- ^1: Because Judy chose the suitcase with nomination in Jason's game, she already faced eviction.
- ^3: Because of winning a battle, Team Pink won the Power of Nomination.
- ^4: Jason had the most nominations and had to leave the house immediately. Unknown to the other housemates, he went to the secret control room.
- ^5: Because of failed secret missions, Jason stayed nominated.
- ^6: Rob had the most nominations during the dilemma nominations and was nominated automatically.
- ^7: Since Charlotte had the fewest votes to save, she was automatically nominated the next week.
- ^8: Since Charlotte and Lindsey won the talent weeks, they were rewarded. Lindsey won immunity and Charlotte lost her nomination (indicated by )
- ^9: Since Lindsey chose the secret box during the jackpot challenge with hourglass, she could nominate one housemate.
