= Rillaar =

Village in Belgium

Coordinates: 50°58′28″N 4°53′36″E

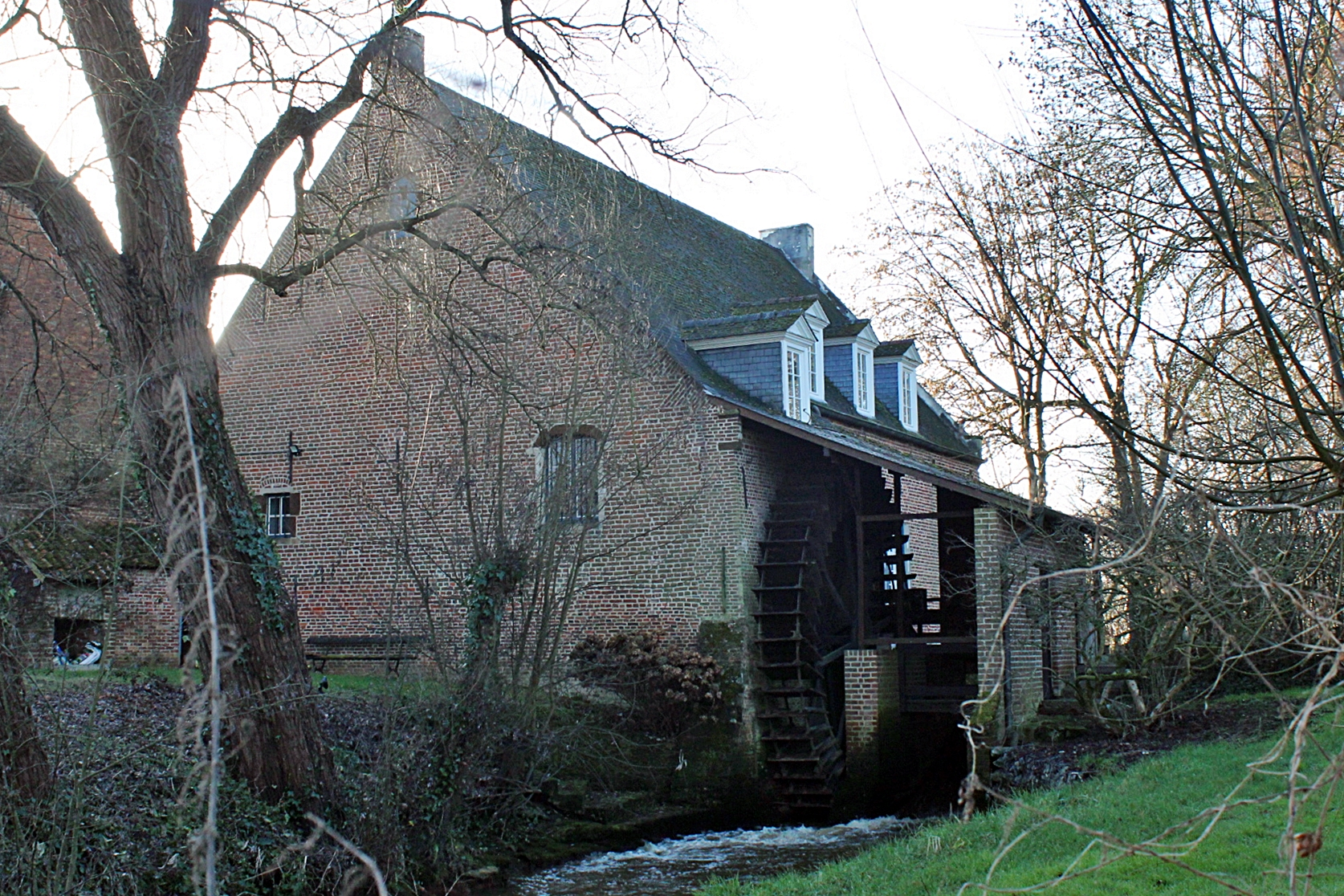
Leefdaele mill

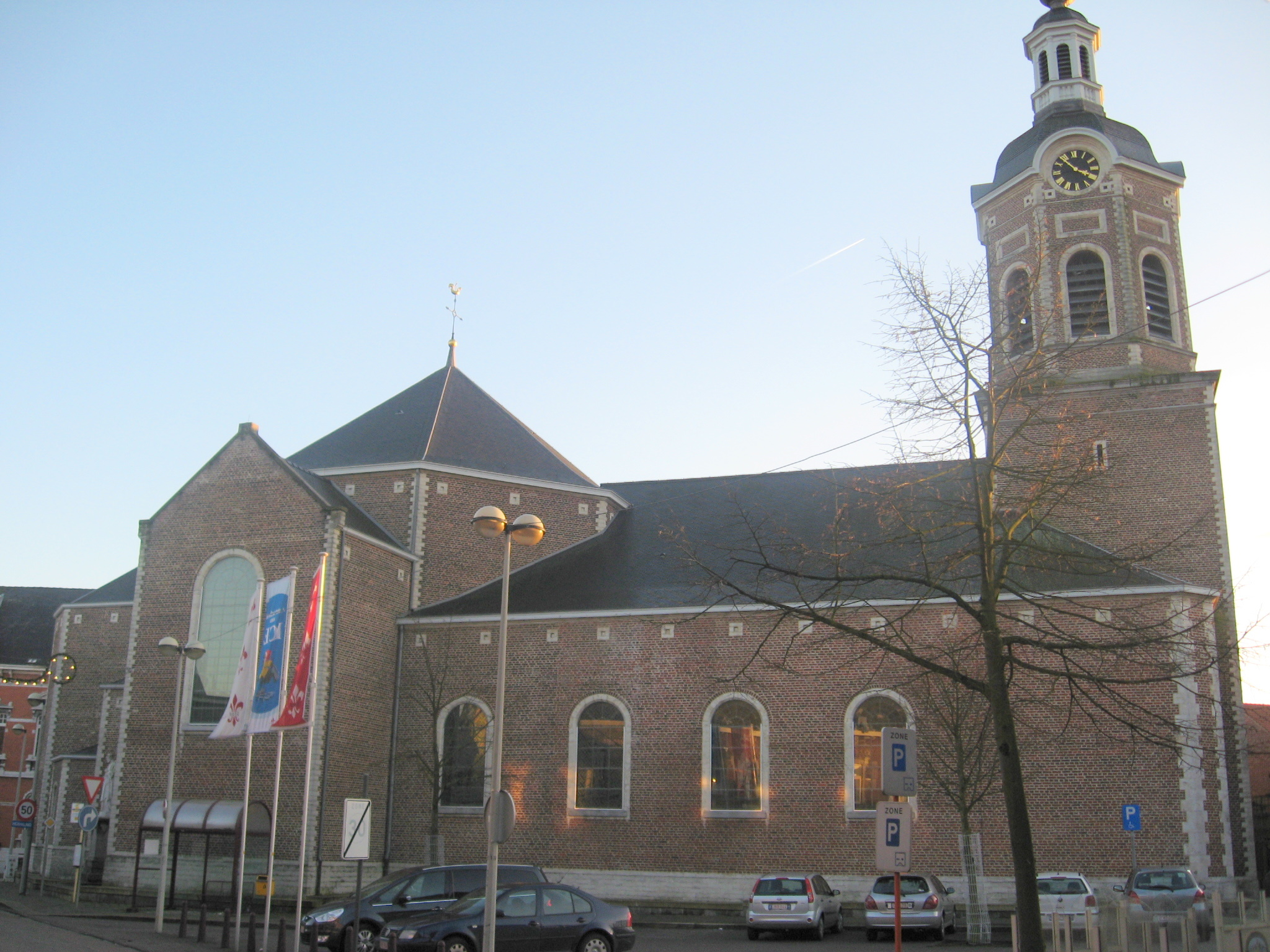
Church in Rillaar

Rillaar is a village in the Belgian province of Flemish Brabant and is a submunicipality of Aarschot. It was an independent municipality until the municipal reorganization of 1977. It has around 5000 inhabitants.

The water mill Leefdaele mill was built before 1378 and is a protected monument.

The village centre has been a protected townscape since 1980 and has been an architectural heritage site since 2021. There are several 18th and 19th century buildings.
