= Langdorp =

Submunicipality in Belgium

Coordinates: 50°59′37″N 4°52′09″E

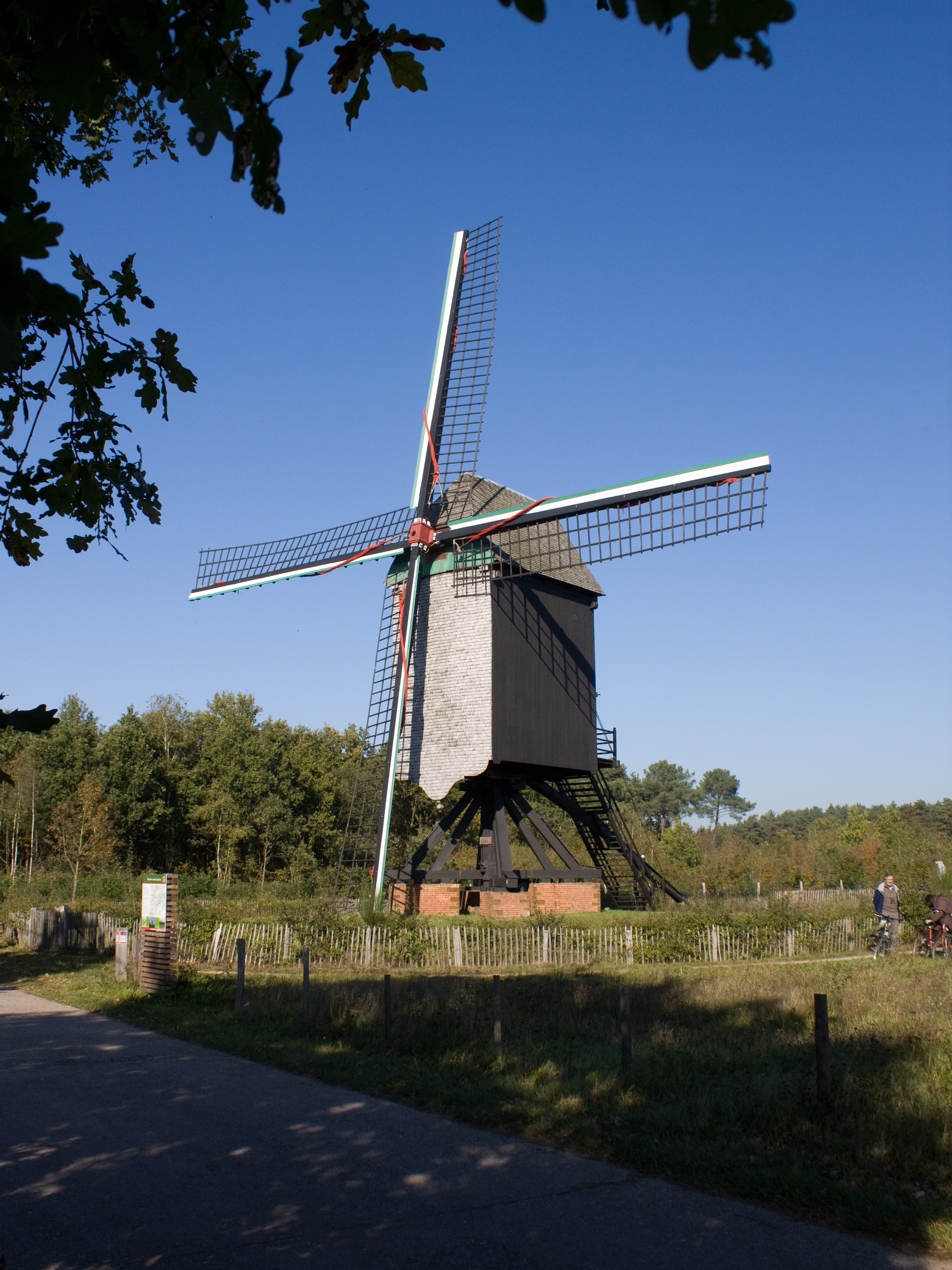
Heimolen

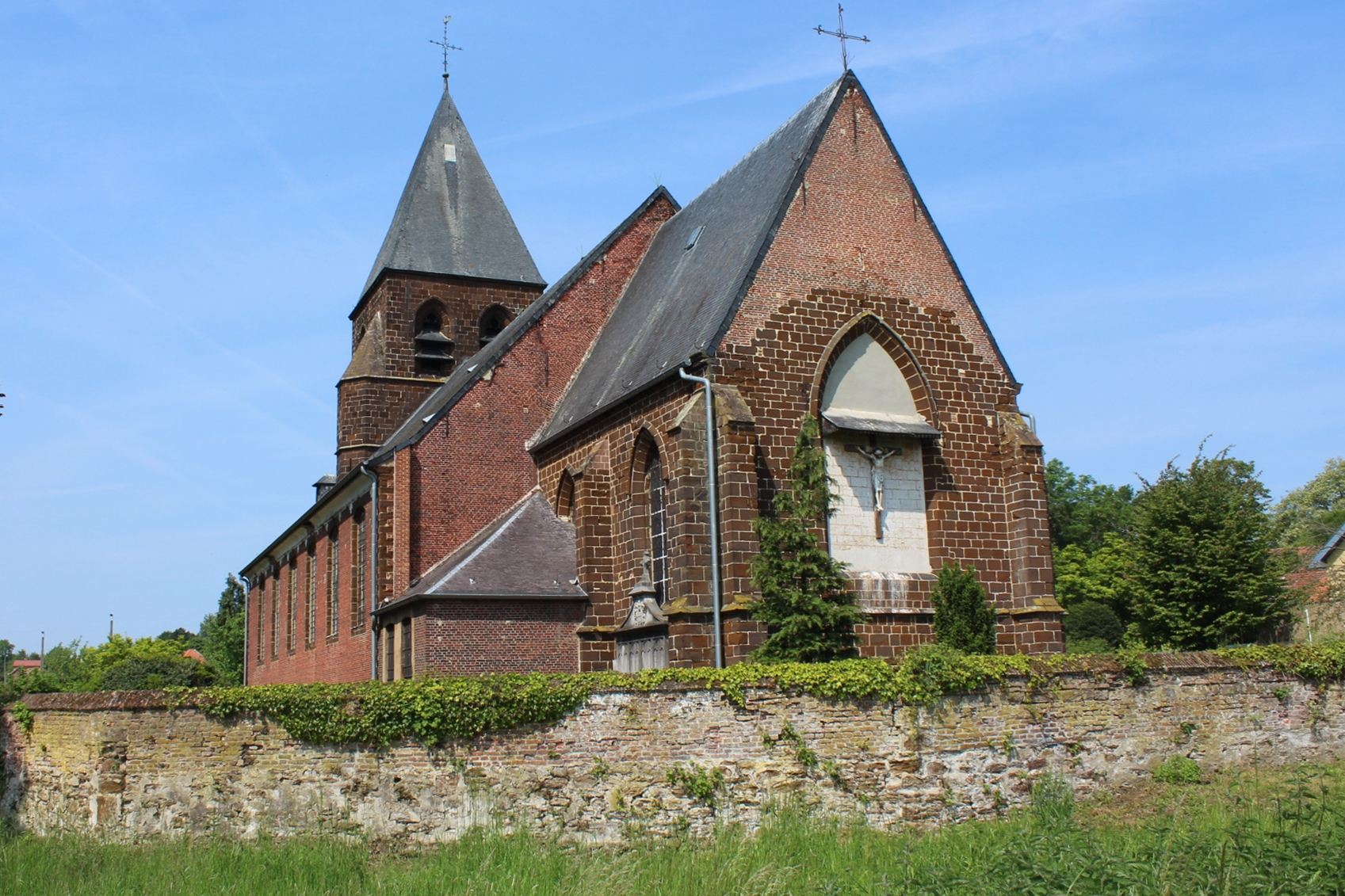
Church in Langdorp

Langdorp is a submunicipality of Aarschot in the Belgian province of Flemish Brabant. It was an independent municipality until the municipal reorganization of 1977. It has around 7500 inhabitants.

It has several protected monuments, including the Heimolen mill and Sint-Pieterkerk.

The village centre has been a protected townscape since 2002 and has been an architectural heritage site since 2021. There are several 18th and 19th century buildings.
