= Gelrode =

Submunicipalitiy in Belgium

Coordinates: 50°57′56″N 4°48′11″E

Coat of arms of Gelrode

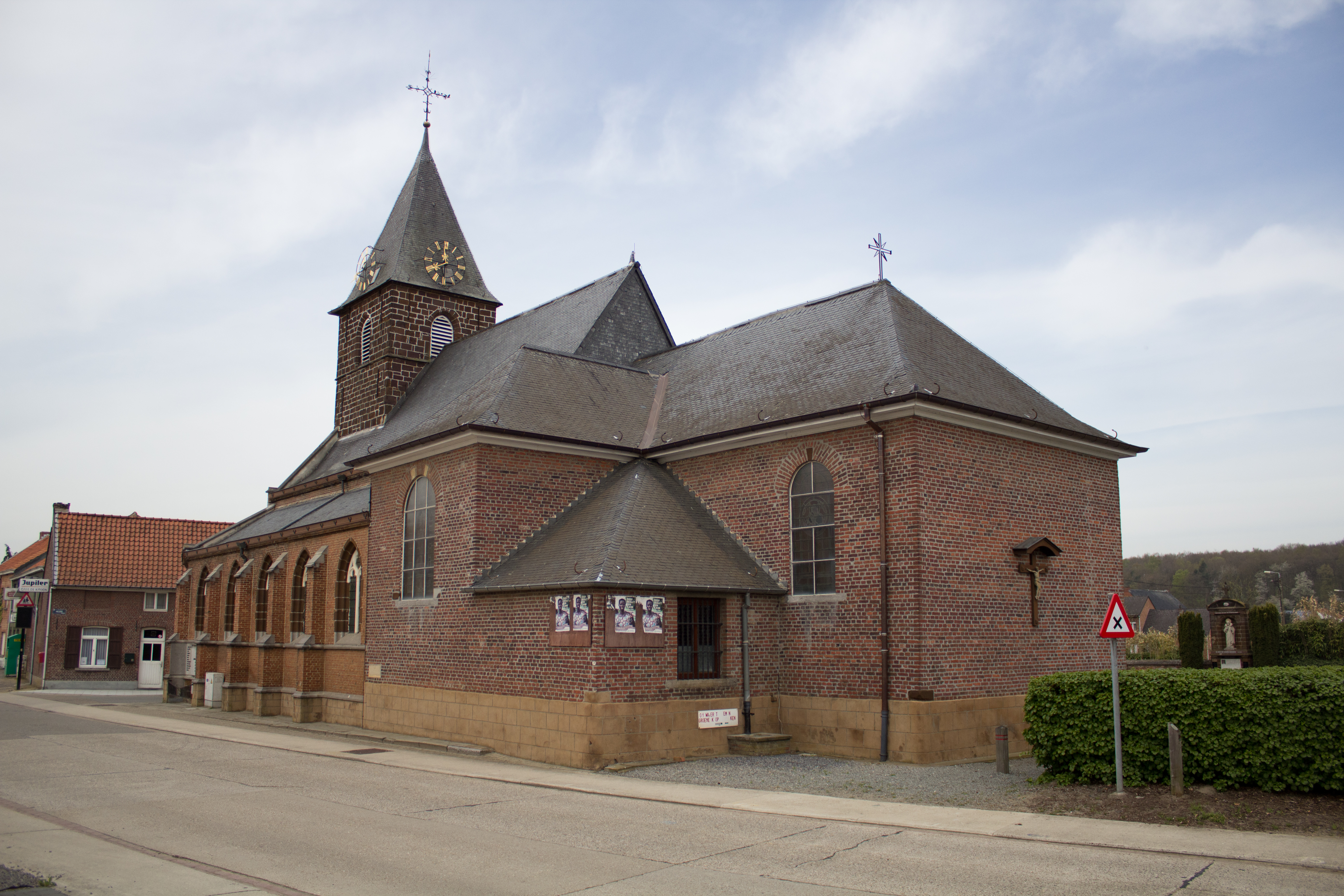
Church in Gelrode

Gelrode is a submunicipality of Aarschot in the Belgian province of Flemish Brabant. It was an independent municipality until the municipal reorganization of 1977. It has around 1950 inhabitants.

It has several protected monuments, including the castle Kasteel van Rivieren, the country estate of Kasteel Nieuwland and the Sint-Corneliuskerk.
