= Aarschot =

- City and municipality
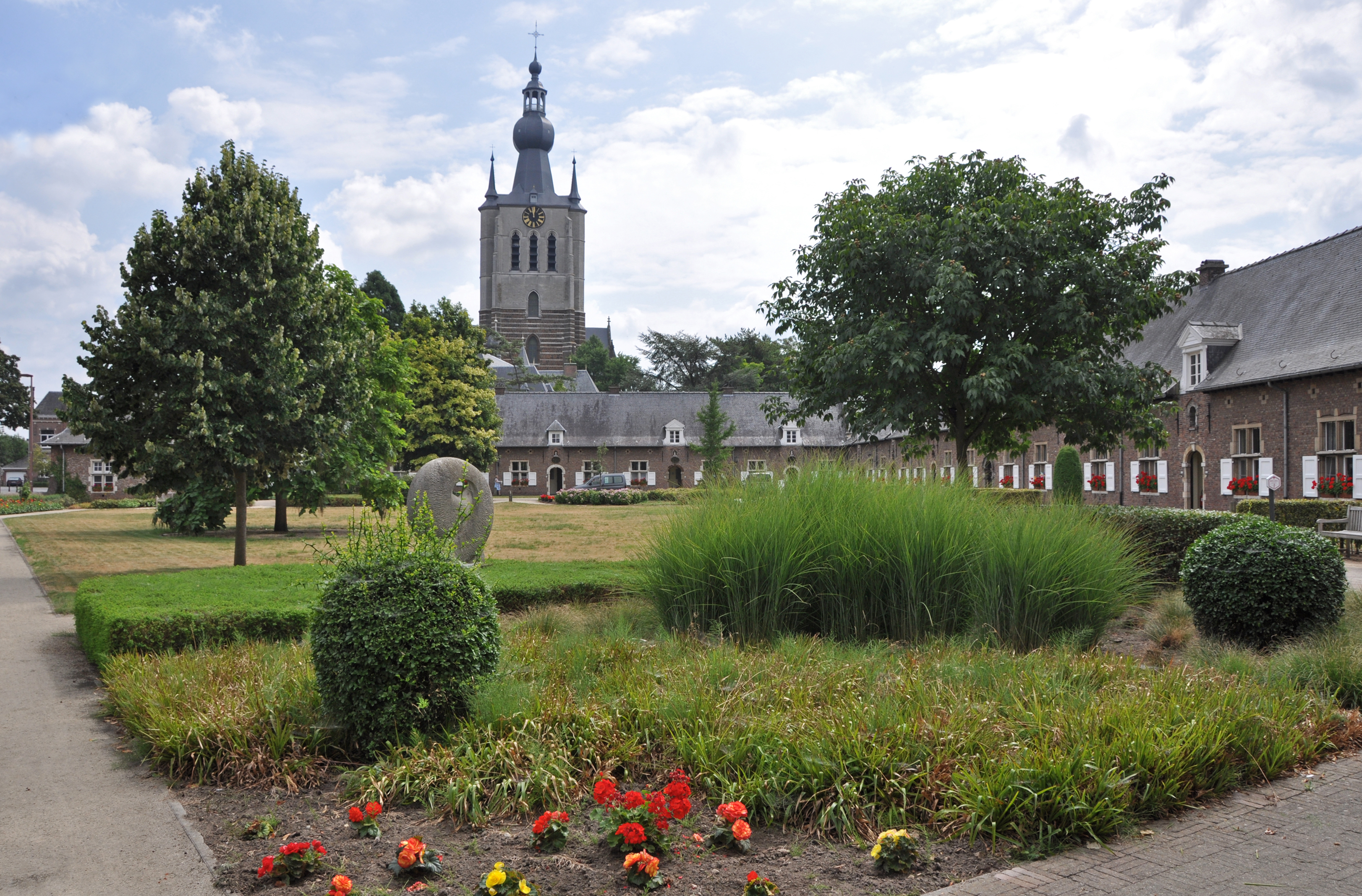
- Begijnhof and the tower of the Church of Our Lady

- Flag Coat of arms

- Location of Aarschot in Flemish Brabant
- Interactive map of Aarschot
- Location in Belgium
- Coordinates: 50°59′N 04°50′E
- Country: Belgium
- Community: Flemish Community
- Region: Flemish Region
- Province: Flemish Brabant
- Arrondissement: Leuven

Government
  - Mayor: Gwendolyn Rutten (OpenVld)
  - Governing parties: OpenVLD, Vooruit, N-VA

Area
  - Total: 63.04 km^{2} (24.34 sq mi)

Population (2018-01-01)
  - Total: 29,965
  - Density: 475.3/km^{2} (1,231/sq mi)
- Postal codes: 3200, 3201, 3202
- NIS code: 24001
- Area codes: 013 - 016 - 014
- Website: www.aarschot.be

Aarschot (Dutch pronunciation: [ˈaːrsxɔt]) is a city and municipality in the province of Flemish Brabant, in Flanders, Belgium. The municipality comprises the city of Aarschot proper and the towns of Gelrode, Langdorp and Rillaar. On 1 January 2019, Aarschot had a total population of 30,106. The total area is 62.52 km^{2} (24.14 sq mi) which gives a population density of 446 inhabitants per km^{2}.

It is located in the part of Flemish Brabant called Hageland, located to the east of Leuven. Aarschot is a very typical town with a long history, dating back to the era of the Roman emperors, according to myths. The church, which dominates the look of the city, is built with the typical brown stone quarried from the hills in the surrounding areas. These same hills were in the Middle Ages home to some of the most well-regarded vineyards of Europe. Today the chain hills, which originate in Bolderberg, Heusden-Zolder, and continue as far as Calais in France, are mainly covered with woods and fruit yards.

The title of Duke of Aarschot, created in 1533, is the oldest (not-Sovereign) Ducal title in Belgium (title created for the House of Croÿ, later inherited by the House of Arenberg that still holds it).

While the Church of Our Lady (Onze-Lieve-Vrouwekerk) definitely leaves its mark on the appearance of the city, nothing defines Aarschot better than the river that passes through it: the Demer. Aarschot is situated in the valley of this brown-colored river.

Aarschot was hit very hard in World War I. When German troops occupied the city on 19 August 1914, Colonel Stenger, commander of the 8th German Infantry Brigade, was shot dead on the balcony of the house of Mayor Tielemans, in which he was quartered. Later on it was established that the deadly shots were fired by one of his own German soldiers. The German reprisal was extremely harsh. Many houses were set alight and 156 people were executed, including Mayor Tielemans and his 15-year-old son. The next day, the entire population was ordered to evacuate the city. Aarschot is known as one of the seven Martyr cities of Belgium because of this event.

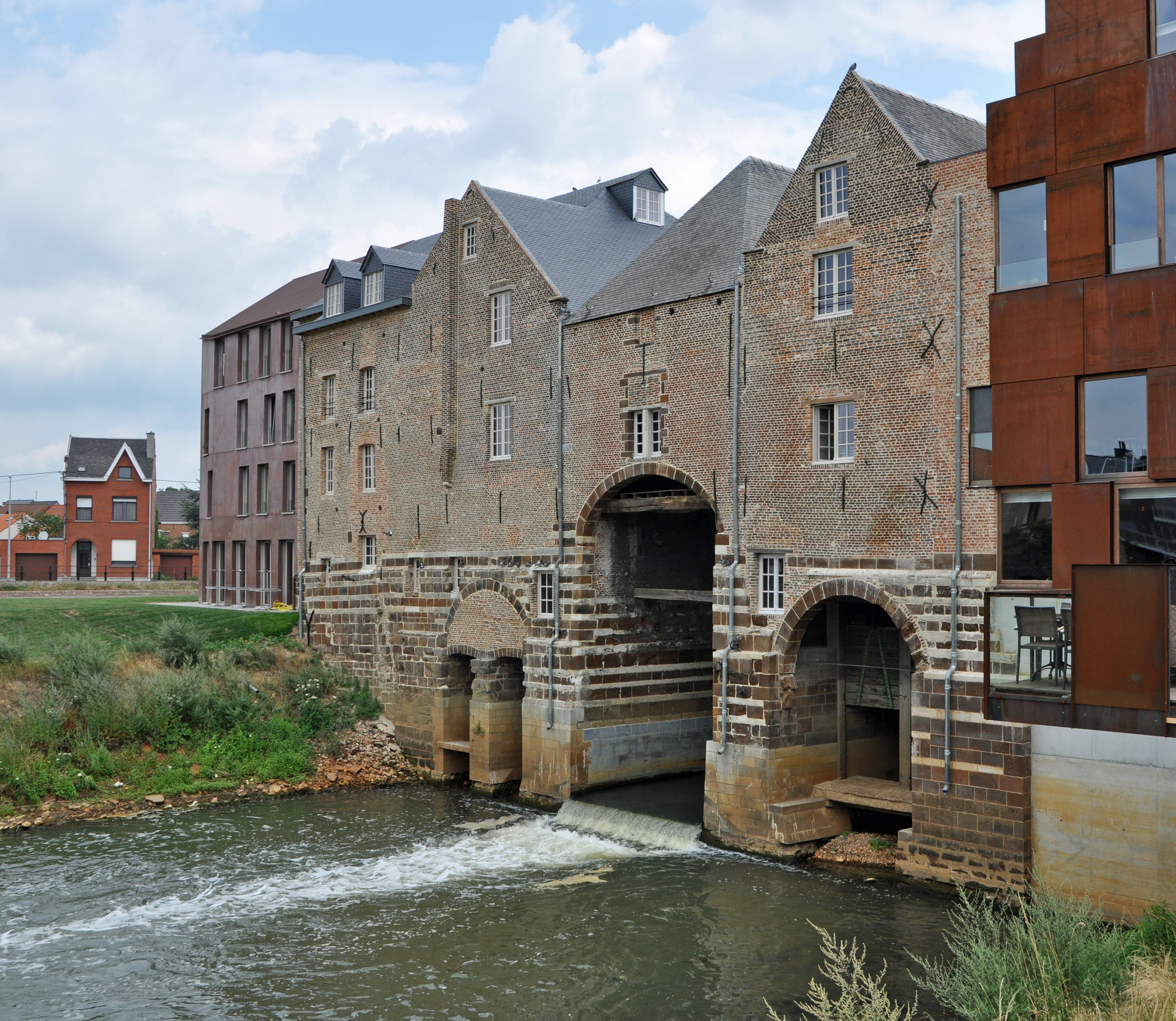
Hertogensmolens downstream side

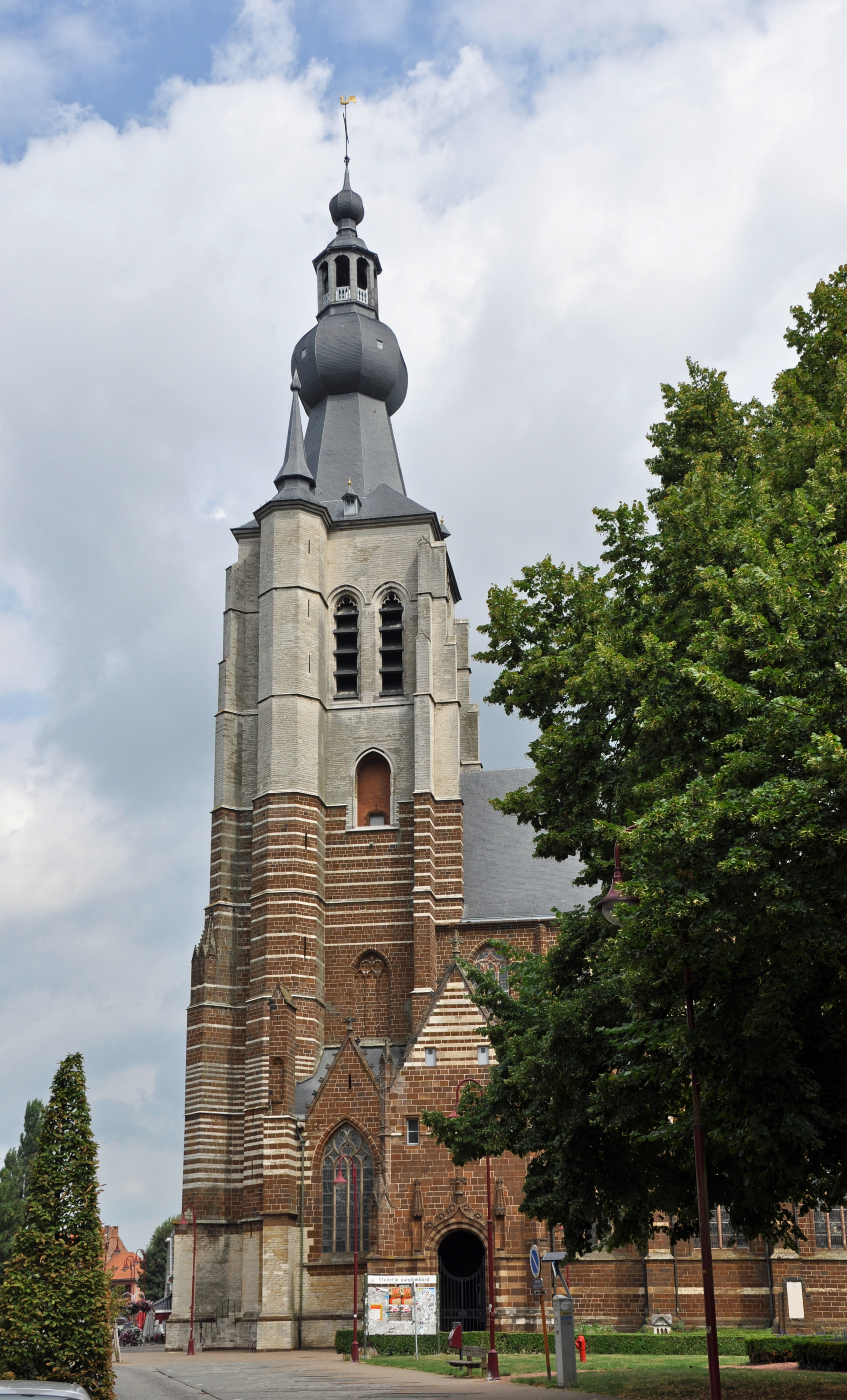
Tower of the Church of Our Lady (from the south)

== Economy ==
Aarschot is known in the region as a hub for schools and shopping, with a fairly extensive industrial area. In the city center, numerous shops line the streets leading to the Grote Markt. However, the city faces significant vacancy in its downtown area. Since the beginning of 2014, the city has implemented regulations to promote the opening of pop-up stores in the short term, aiming to reduce vacancy rates. In the Hageland region, Leuven serves as the dominant commercial center, offering a wider and more varied range of goods and services. Aarschot is also known for its several large retail spaces. Some garden centers have established themselves along the road to Rillaar. Nearby, the Gouden Kruispunt (Tielt-Winge) serves as a retail hub with over 60 stores. In 2015, construction began on the De Witte Molen small and medium-sized enterprise (SME) zone.

== Famous inhabitants ==
- Front 242, electronic music group
- Scala & Kolacny Brothers, choir
- Dany Verlinden, soccer player
