= Sint-Amands =

- Town
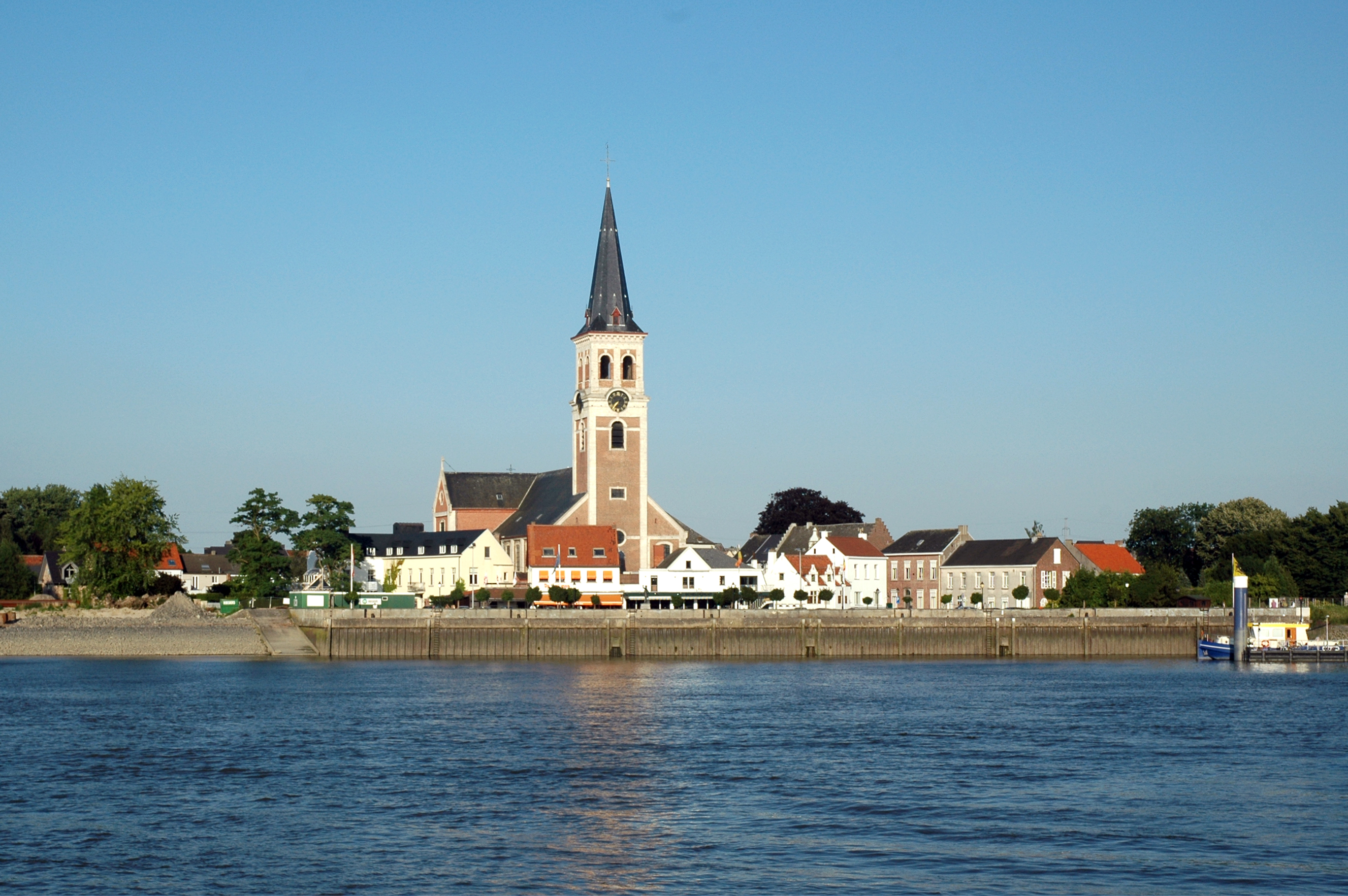
- Sint-Amands on the river Scheldt

- Flag Seal

- Location in Belgium
- Coordinates: 51°03′N 04°12′E
- Country: Belgium
- Region: Flemish Region
- Province: Antwerp
- Arrondissement: Mechelen
- Municipality: Puurs-Sint-Amands

Area
  - Total: 15.58 km^{2} (6.02 sq mi)

Population (2021)
  - Total: 8,524
  - Density: 547.1/km^{2} (1,417/sq mi)
- Time zone: CET
- Postal code: 2890
- Dialing code: 052, 03

Sint-Amands (Dutch pronunciation: [ˌsɪnt ɑˈmɑnts]) is a town and a former municipality located in the Belgian province of Antwerp, Belgium. The municipality comprises the towns of Lippelo, Oppuurs and Sint-Amands proper. In 2021, Sint-Amands had a total population of 8,524. The total area is 15.58 km^{2}. Sint-Amands is located at the right bank of the Scheldt river.

Effective 1 January 2019, Puurs and Sint-Amands were merged into the new municipality of Puurs-Sint-Amands.

== History ==
The inhabited area of Sint-Amands has been present since Roman times, with Roman artifacts discovered in the modern-day municipality.

The first written reference to Sint-Amands dates to 822, in a document authored by Louis the Pious, king of Carolingian Empire at that time and son of Charlemagne. Sint-Amands was the central location of the Baasrode region (today Dendermonde) and the region was given as a gift to the Saint-Amand Abbey.

In the 11th century, the region split into three parts: Baasrode, Sint-Amands, and Mariekerke. During this time period, a large area of the right bank of the Scheldt River was incorporated into the Flanders region and Sint-Amands became a separate seigneury.

The establishment of a parish in Sint-Amands was first noted in 1281 in the records of the diocese of Kamerijk. In 1559, the parish merged with the diocese of Mechelen until 1600 when it merged with the diocese of Ghent. In 1801, the parish once again presided under the diocese of Mechelen.

== Industry ==
Until the 19th century, Sint-Amands was an agricultural town. There were several large farms, but most land was divided into smaller farms.

Prior to the construction of the Brussels-Willebroek canal, Sint-Amands saw heavy shipping traffic with barges heading to Brussels, Mechelen, Antwerp, Dendermonde, and Temse.

== Points of interest ==
=== Heritage Railway ===
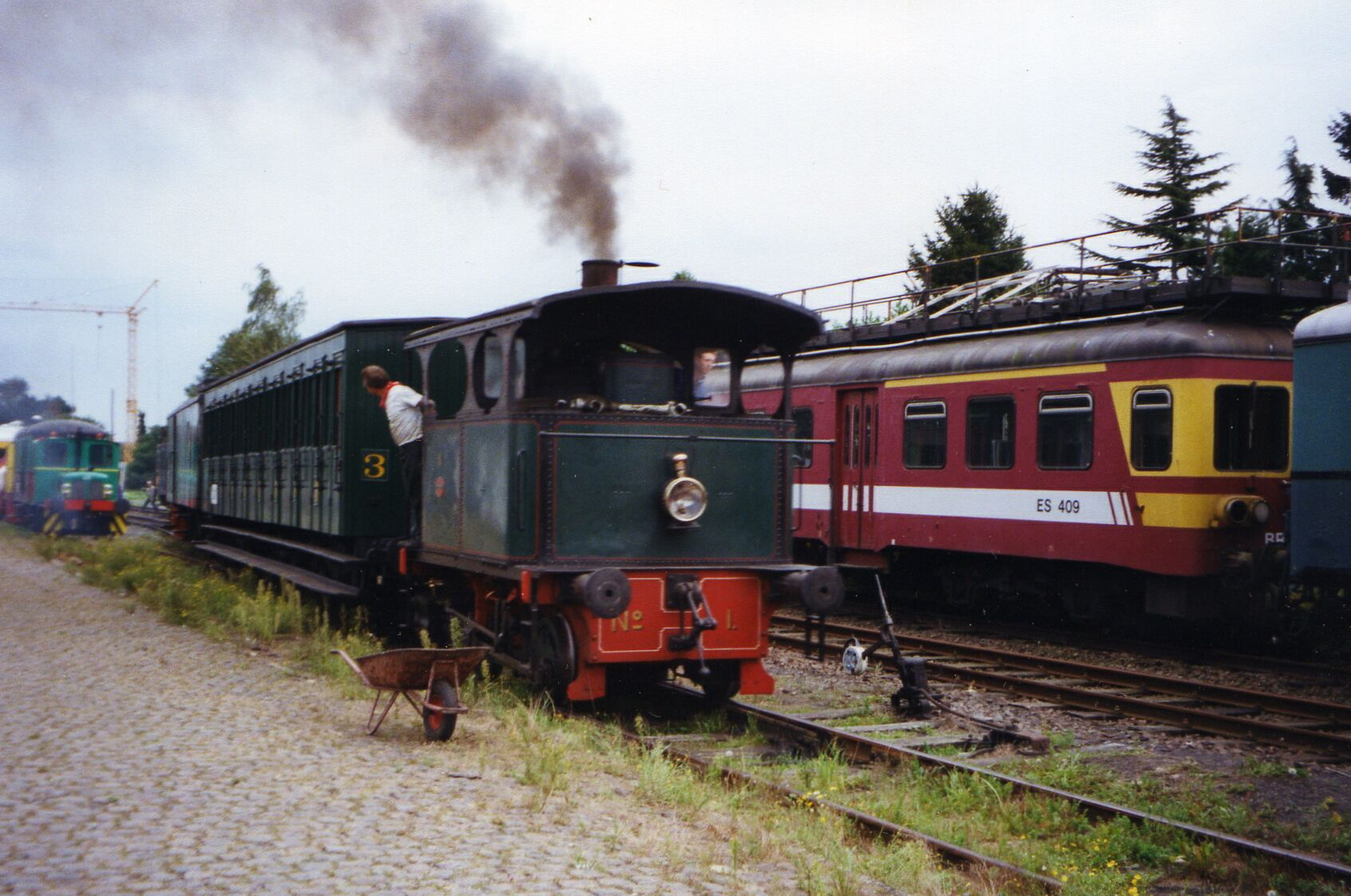
Historic steam train

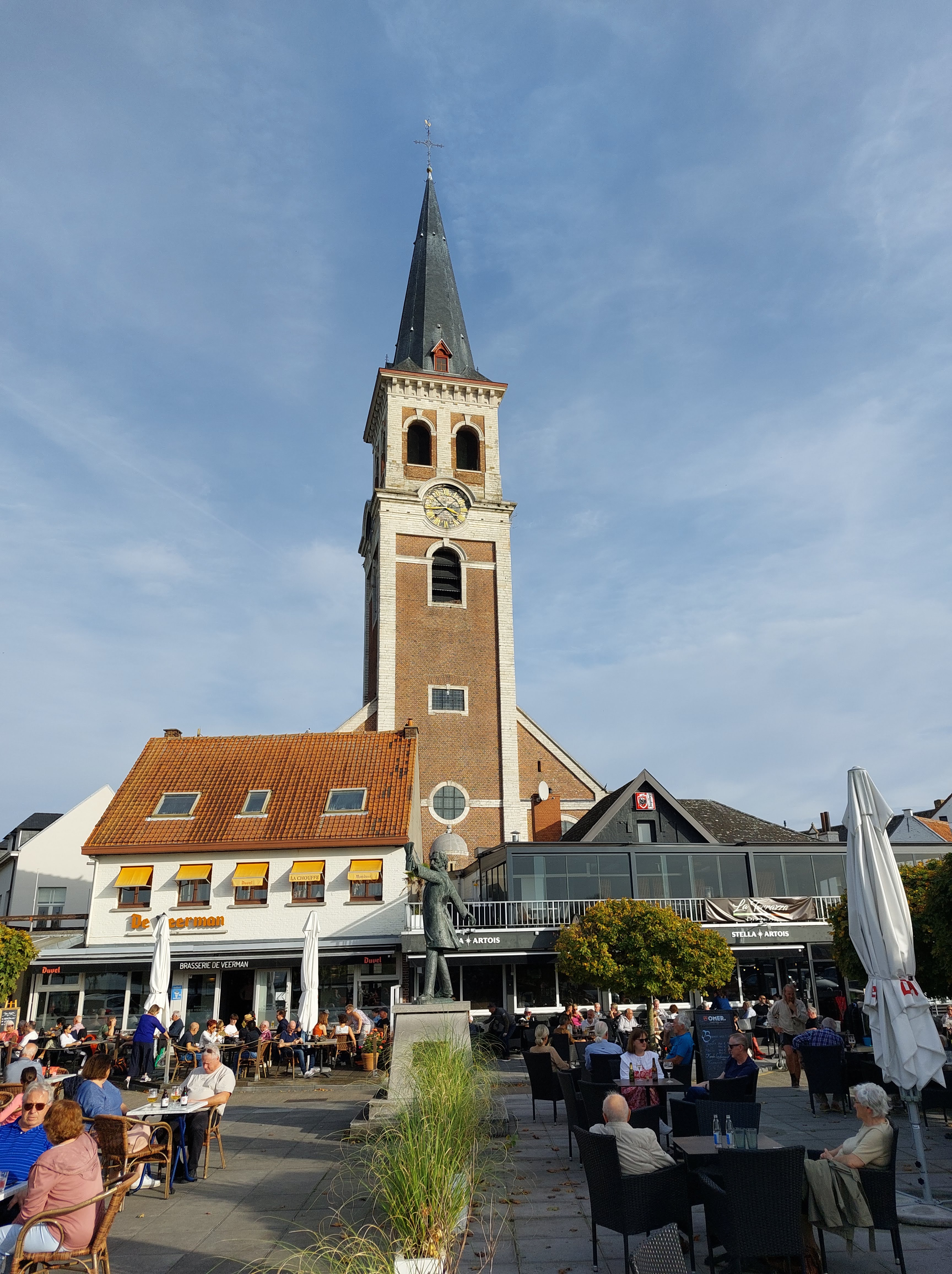
Sint-Amands church

The Dendermonde-Puurs Steam Railway is a heritage railroad that links up Puurs and Dendermonde. The maintenance road that runs alongside serves as a bicycle track. Bikers can leave the track in Sint-Amands and follow the scenic route up North on the banks of the river Scheldt.

=== Émile Verhaeren Museum ===
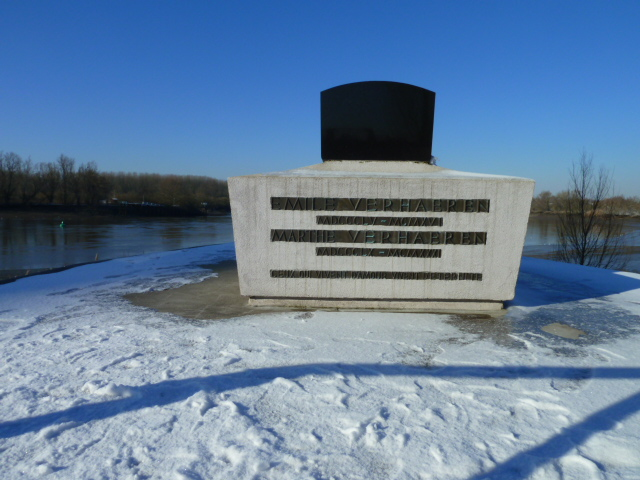
Grave of Emile Verhaeren

Émile Adolphe Gustave Verhaeren (Dutch: [vərˈɦaːrən]; 21 May 1855 – 27 November 1916) was a Belgian poet who wrote in the French language and an art critic. He was one of the founders of the school of Symbolism and was nominated for the Nobel Prize in Literature on six occasions.

=== Grave of Emile Verhaeren ===
The tomb of the poet Emile Verhaeren sits on the bank of the Scheldt River, near the Sint-Amands church.

=== Mill Museum ===
Various models and mill arrangements can be found within the museum. The museum also houses books, reference works, photos, magazines, newspaper clippings and paintings.

=== Sint-Amands Church ===
The Roman Catholic church of Sint-Amands dates back to 1417 and remains in use to this day.

=== Fourage Castle ===
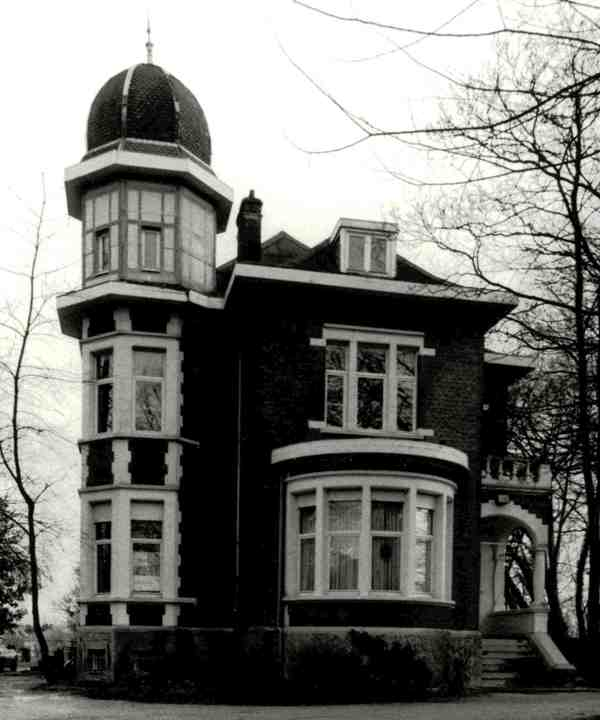
Fourage castle

Fourage castle is a former manufacturer villa built in 1912. The building was owned by a Mr. Fourage, the owner of a chemical fertilizer factory. In the 1960s, the building was rented to the Zonnehuis Foundation as a home for abandoned children.

=== Our Lady of the Dark Chapel (Onze-Lieve-Vrouw-Ten-Donkerekapel) ===
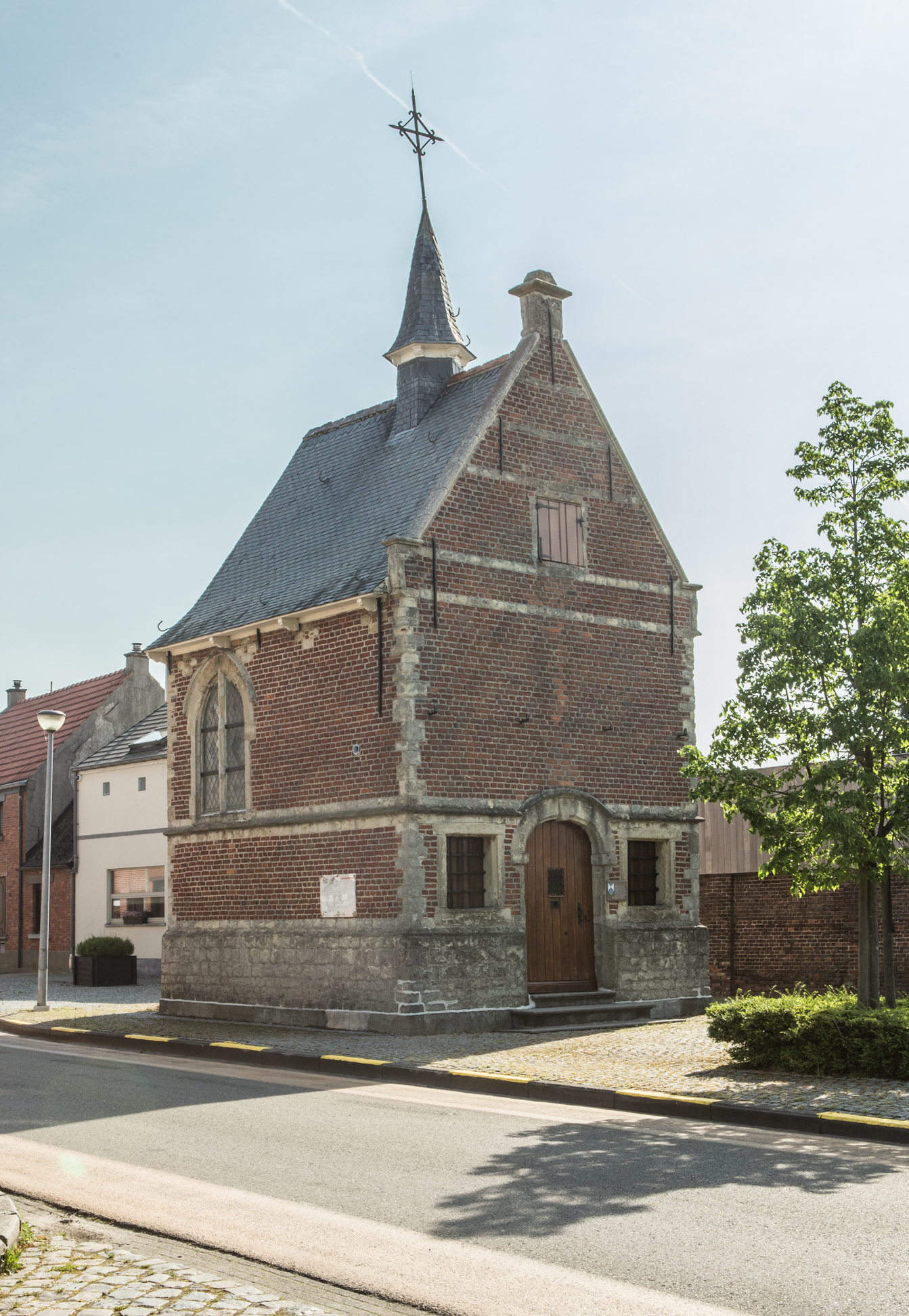
Kapel van Onze-Lieve-Vrouw Ten Donkere

A small chapel dedicated to the Virgin Mary containing an altar dating to the 1700s.

== Notable people ==
- Emmanuel Benedict Rollier 1769-1851). Leader of the Peasants' War of 1798.
- James Oliver Van de Velde (1795-1855). President of St. Louis University, Bishop of Chicago and Natchez.
- Jan Amandus van Droogenbroeck (1835-1902). Poet and writer.
- Emile Verhaeren (1855-1916). Poet. His grave is located on the bank of the Scheldt river.
- Arthur Borms (1890 -1952). Politician.
- Romain De Saegher (1907-1986). Artist.
- Didier De Witte (1934-1970). Writer.

== See also ==
- Klein-Brabant
- Puurs-Sint-Amands
