= Puurs =

- Town
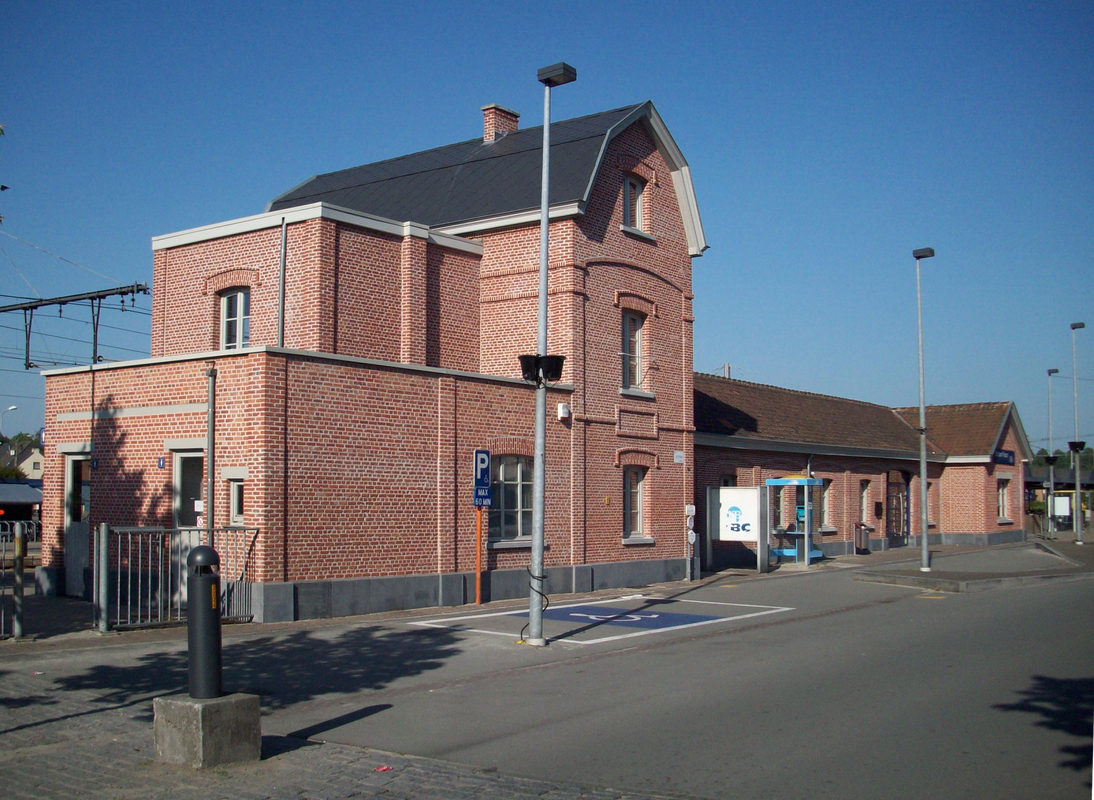
- Puurs train station

- Flag Seal

- Location in Belgium
- Coordinates: 51°4′34″N 4°16′49″E
- Country: Belgium
- Region: Flemish Region
- Province: Antwerp
- Arrondissement: Mechelen
- Municipality: Puurs-Sint-Amands

Area
  - Total: 33.41 km^{2} (12.90 sq mi)

Population (2021)
  - Total: 17,684
  - Density: 529.3/km^{2} (1,371/sq mi)
- Time zone: CET
- Postal code: 2870
- Dialing code: 03, 052

Puurs (Dutch pronunciation: [pyːrs]) is a former municipality located in the Belgian province of Antwerp. It is located in the Flemish Region. The municipality comprised the towns of Breendonk, Liezele, Kalfort, Ruisbroek (old spelling: Ruysbroeck) and Puurs proper. There is also the hamlet of Kalfort. In 2021, Puurs had a total population of 17,684. The total area is 33.41 km^{2} (12 7/8 sq mi).

Puurs sits about 5 meters above mean sea level. Its geography shows only minor elevation differences. Puurs is mainly rural, with some low intensity industry development in the North alongside the N16 expressway. However, because of its proximity to the cities of Antwerp and Brussels (both within a 25 km or 15 1/2 mi radius) and its excellent accessibility, Puurs is developing increasingly into a residential town.

Effective 1 January 2019, Puurs and Sint-Amands were merged into the new municipality of Puurs-Sint-Amands.

== History ==
Signs of habitation dating back to the Iron Age, as well as early Roman and Merovingian times, have been found in Puurs.

Arguably, the Benedictine abbeys of Saint-Cornelimunster of Aachen were the lords of Puurs in the 10th century AD. In 1278 the municipality was acquired by the Abbey of Sint-Bernard's upon Scheldt, whose property it would remain until the end of the 18th century.

== Points of interest ==
=== Saint-Peter Church ===
Puurs' Saint-Peter Church is quite large and is hence sometimes referred to as the region's "cathedral". It was built in the 15th century, on the remains of a roman-style church. The baroque-style bell tower was added in the late 17th century. The classical center piece was completed in 1744.

=== Asparagus ===
The lands of Kalfort are widely renowned for producing the most delicious asparagus, and at the beginning of summer a festival is held in honour of this "white gold".

=== Beer ===
The internationally sold Duvel beer is brewed in Breendonk, by the Duvel-Moortgat brewery. Each year in August, a 100 km (62 mi) long foot march called the Dodentocht (Death March) passes by the brewery, and participants and spectators can enjoy Duvel beer for free.

=== Nazi Prison Camp ===
Fort Breendonk was used by the Nazis as a political prison camp. It is kept in its World War II state and is open for visiting. Fort Breendonk and its twin sister Fort Liezele (which now serves as a municipal recreational area) were initially built by the Belgian military just before World War I, as part of a string of fortresses (the National Redoubt) designed to protect the approaches to Antwerp. Since 1976, the site of the fort has been part of the municipality of Willebroek.

=== Heritage railway ===
The Dendermonde-Puurs Steam Railway is a heritage railroad that links up Puurs and Dendermonde. The maintenance road that runs alongside serves as a bicycle track. Bikers can leave the track in Sint-Amands and follow the scenic route up North on the banks of the river Scheldt.

=== COVID-19 vaccine manufacturing ===
Puurs is the location of Pfizer's COVID-19 vaccine manufacturing hub in Europe. Starting in December 2020, vaccine doses were transported by armed cargo trucks and military-escorted planes, to facilities across the planet.

== Twin towns and sister cities ==
Puurs was twinned with:

- Dębica in Poland

On 13 November 2020, the municipality of Puurs-Sint-Amands suspended its 20-year-long partnership with the Polish town of Dębica because of the town's adoption of the Charter of The Rights of The Family, which, according to the Belgians, discriminates against LGBT people.

== Notable people ==
- Dina Tersago, former Miss Belgium (2001)

== See also ==
- Klein-Brabant
