= Ferguut =

Ferguut may refer to:

- Jan Ferguut, Flemish poet and writer
- Roman van Ferguut, 13th-century romance
