= Égide de Boeck =

Égide de Boeck C.I.C.M.
- Vicar Apostolic of Lisala
- Church: Catholic Church
- See: Apostolic Vicariate of Lisala
- In office: 4 January 1921 – 20 December 1944
- Predecessor: Vicariate established
- Successor: François Van den Berghe
- Other post: Titular Bishop of Azotus (1921-1944)

Orders
- Ordination: 1 July 1900
- Consecration: 8 May 1921 by Antoine Alphonse de Wachter

Personal details
- Born: 13 November 1875 Oppuurs, Antwerp Province, Belgium
- Died: 20 December 1944 (aged 69) Lisala, Coquilhatville Province, Belgian Congo

Égide de Boeck was born on 13 November 1875 in Oppuurs, Belgium. He was a priest, religious and linguist in the then Belgian Congo. He died on 20 December 1944.

== Life ==
De Boeck grew up in Flanders. His father was a primary school teacher, his mother a very devout woman. He had several younger brothers and sisters: Alphonse, a priest in Belgium, Marlo, Achilles and Jules, both missionaries in Scheut, a sister who worked as a nun in the Philippines and a brother who married.

After secondary school in Mechelen, he entered the novitiate of the missionaries of Scheut in 1894. He was ordained a priest on 1 July 1900 and was sent to New Antwerp (now Makanza) in the Congo Free State on 1 September of the same year. From 1913 to 1916 he was Apostolic Prefect of Kasaï Supérieur.

On 8 May 1921 he was ordained Bishop and Titular Bishop of Azotus. Already on 4 January 1921 he took up the office of Apostolic Vicar of New Antwerp, which he held until 27 January 1936. On that day he was appointed Apostolic Vicar of Lisala as a result of the reorganization of the Congolese dioceses, which he remained until his death.

== Lingala ==
As the son of a teacher, the school system was important to de Boeck. From the very beginning, he was committed to improving education in the Belgian Congo. On his travels, he always paid special attention to schools and introduced school inspectors. He discovered that there were many variants of Bangala spoken in the region. He gathered all available information and unified it into a standard language, the Lingala. This work resulted in a translation of the New Testament and a grammar and dictionary. His linguistic work was always a means to an end, especially for the school.

Sometimes criticism is voiced that de Boeck introduced Lingala everywhere and displaced the local languages. This may be partially true, since the limited possibilities of the missionaries did not allow them to write textbooks for over 200 languages. On the other hand, de Boeck always advocated that the local languages should be cultivated alongside the Lingala and that, for example, religious instruction should explicitly not be held in Lingala. For Lingombe, Ebudja and Gbaka he had corresponding teaching materials created.

== Varia ==
The Égide-de-Bœck cultural centres in Mongala, Équateur and Southern Ubangi are named after de Boeck.

== Publications ==
=== By Égide de Boeck ===
- Langue congolaise. Exercices de lecture à l'usage des colonies de l'état par un père de la Congrégation de Scheut. Brussels, s.a.: J. Lebègue & Cie.
- Cours théorique et pratique de lingala, avec vocabulaire et phrases usuelles. Antwerp, 1942: Impr. Saint Norbert.
- Eenige begrippen van lingala: met woordenlijst en gebruikelijke volzinnen = Quelques notions du lingala avec vocabulaire et phrases actuelles. Brussels, 1914: Impr. Th. Dewarichet.
- Grammaire et Vocabulaire de lingala. Nieuw Antwerpen, 1904: Mission du Sacré Cœur.
