= Liezele =

- Village
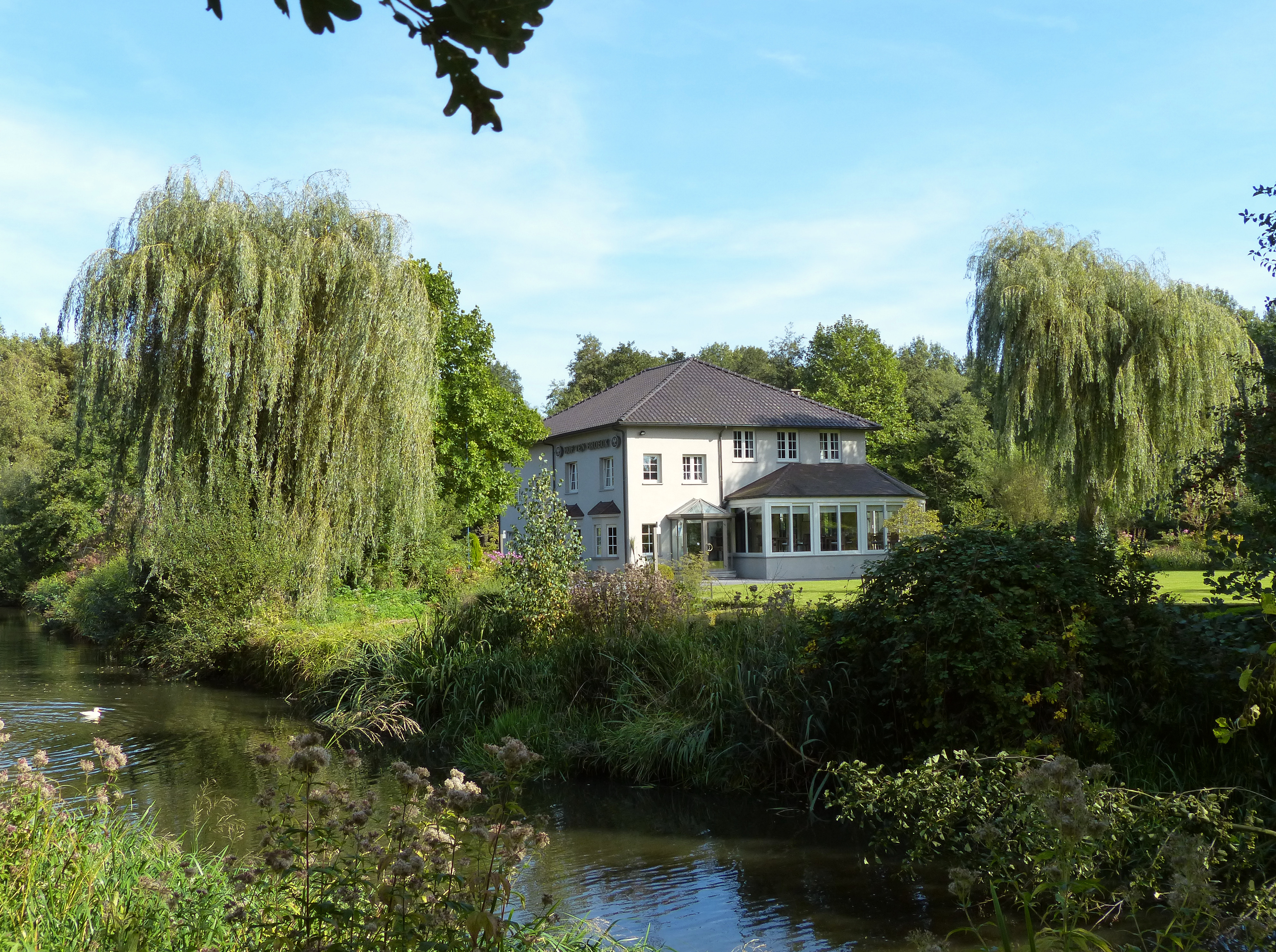
- Hof Ten Broeck

- Location in Belgium
- Coordinates: 51.0596°N 4.2808°E
- Country: Belgium
- Region: Flemish Region
- Province: Antwerp
- Municipality: Puurs-Sint-Amands

Area
  - Total: 6.51 km^{2} (2.51 sq mi)

Population (2021)
  - Total: 1,807
  - Density: 278/km^{2} (719/sq mi)
- Time zone: CET

Liezele is a village and deelgemeente (sub-municipality) of the municipality of Puurs-Sint-Amands in the province of Antwerp, Belgium. The village is located about 20 kilometres (12 mi) south-south-west of the city of Antwerp. On the night of 4 to 5 September 1914, the entire village was destroyed by the Belgian Army to deny the Germany Army cover.

== History ==
Liezele was originally located in an area of heaths and forests. The village was first mentioned in 1138 or 1139 as Liensella when it became a parish belonging to Affligem Abbey. The area was divided by the Lords of Grimbergen and the Duchy of Brabant. In 1662, the heerlijkheden (landed estates) of Liezele, Lippelo and Malderen became the property of J.F. de la Pierre. In 1795, Liezele became an independent municipality.

Liezele used to be an agricultural area. In 1908, construction started on the Fort van Liezele as part of the National Redoubt. The first soldiers were stationed in the fortress in March 1913. On 4 August 1914, Germany invaded Belgium. Due to the speed of their advance, commander Fiévez asked permission to destroy the village of Liezele to deny the German Army cover. On the night of 4 to 5 September, the village, church, castle, and manor houses were burnt and the walls of the buildings were torn down. Antwerp capitulated on 10 October 1914, and the fortress was handed over undamaged. Liezele contains no historic buildings, because all the buildings were constructed after 1914.

Liezele remained an independent municipality until 1977, when it was merged into Puurs. In 2019, Puurs was merged into the municipality of Puurs-Sint-Amands.

== Gallery ==
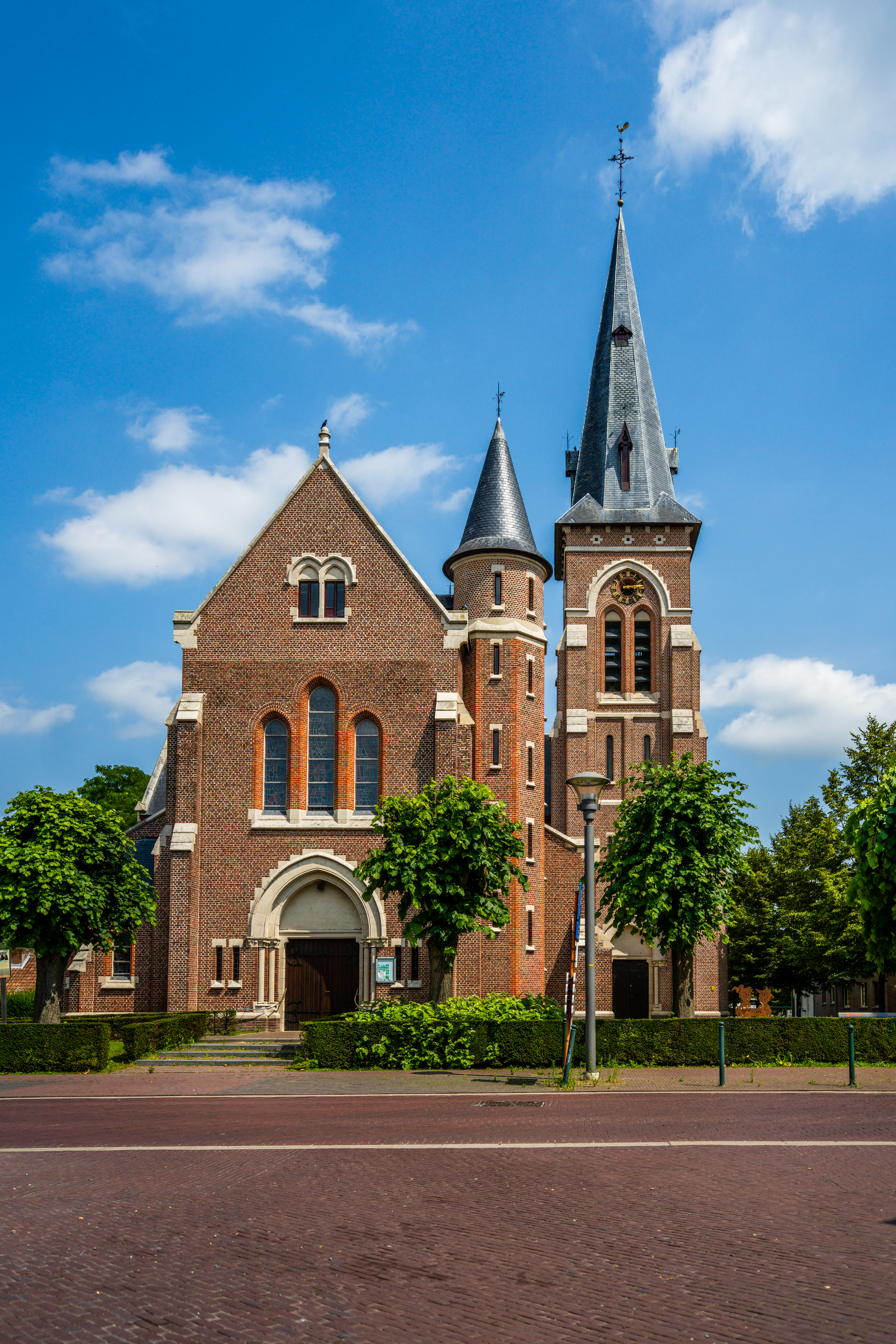
St Josef Church

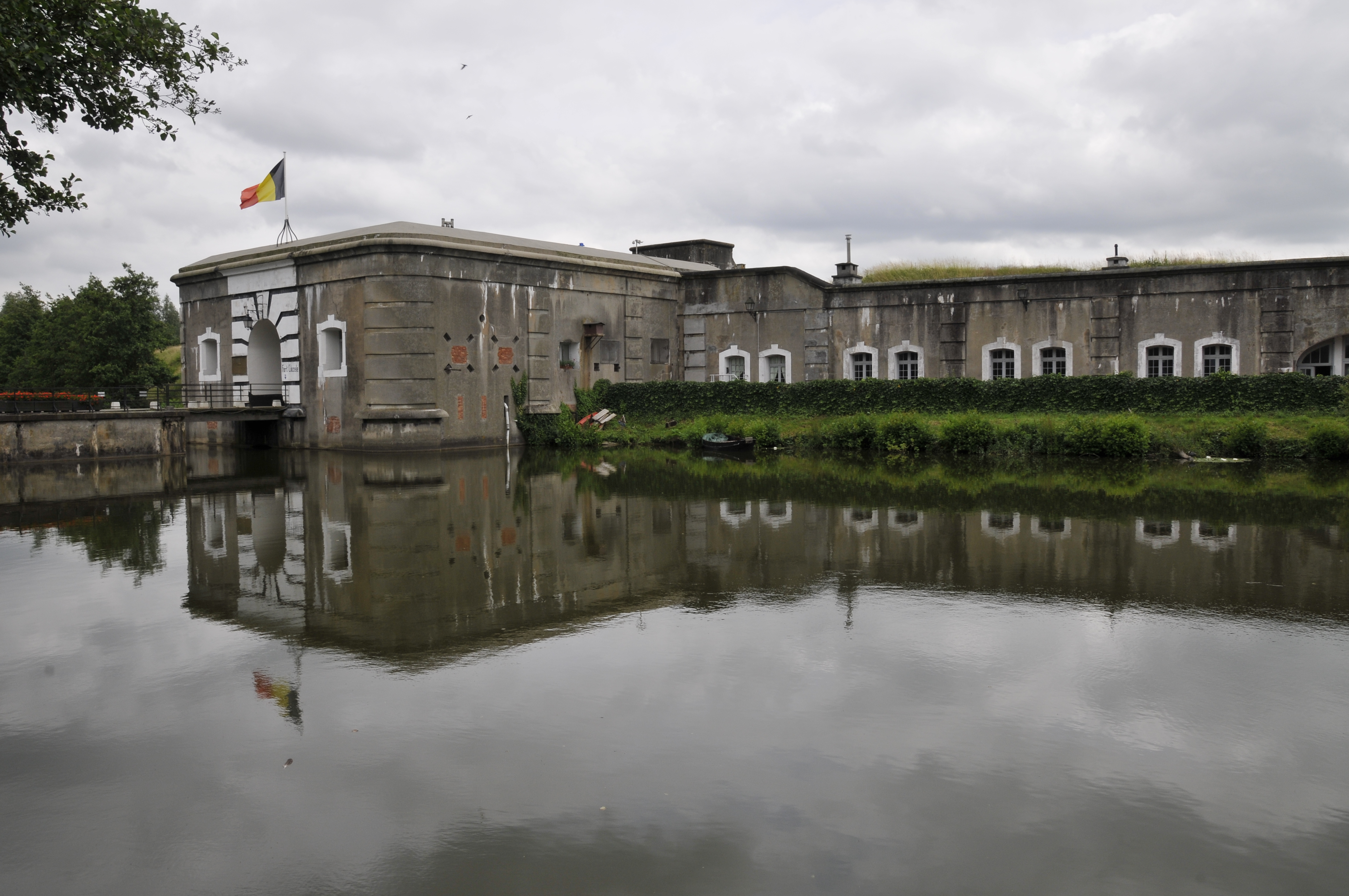
Fort van Liezele

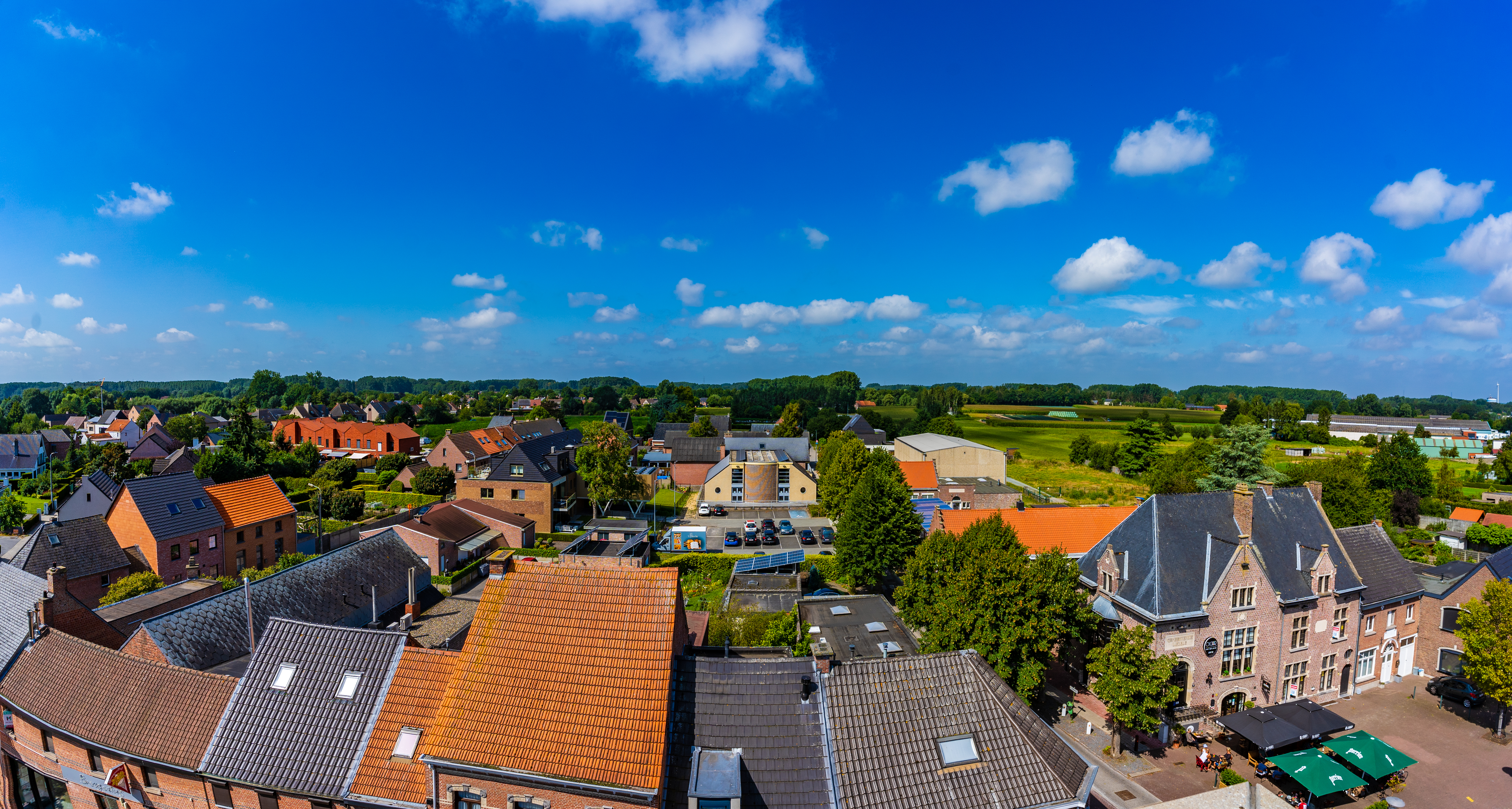
View on Liezele

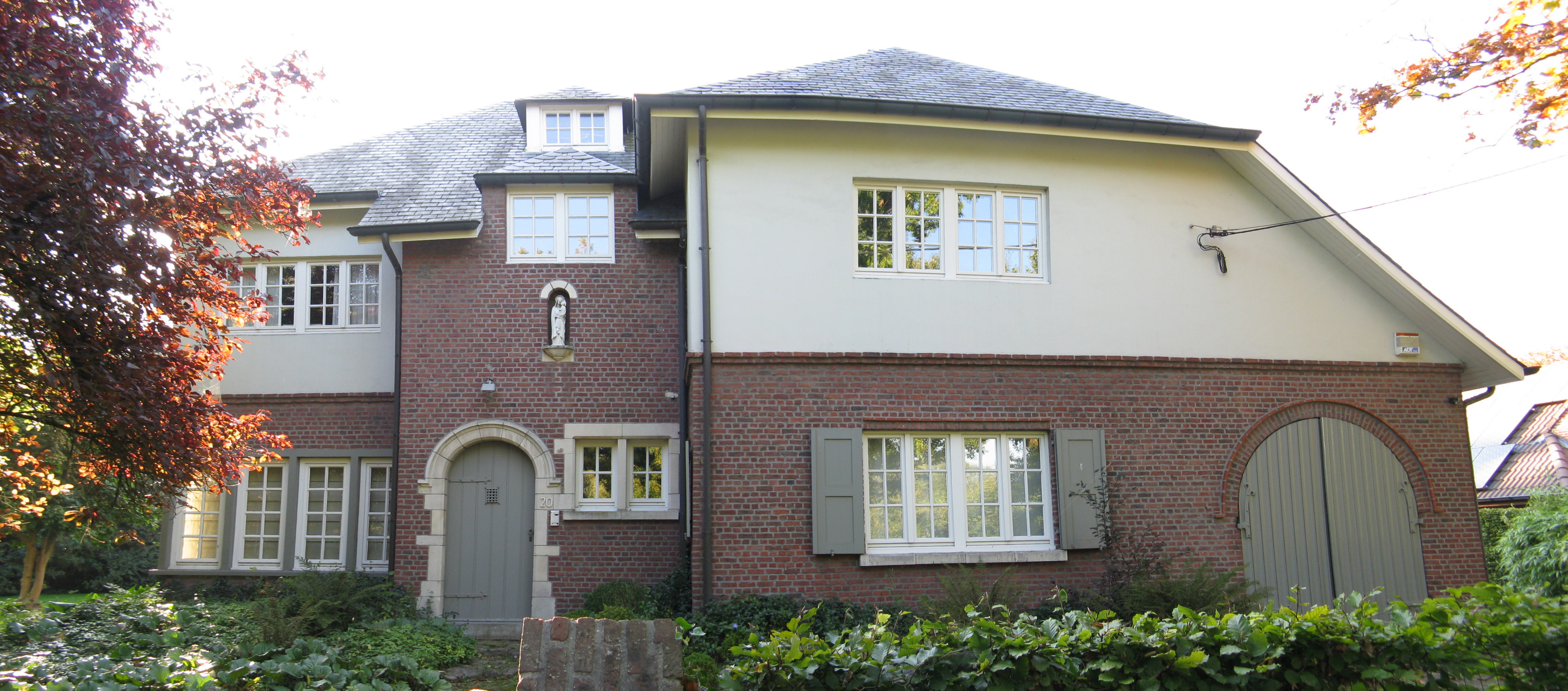
Villa in Liezele
