= Ruisbroek =

Ruisbroek may refer to multiple places in Belgium:

- Ruisbroek, Antwerp, a village in the municipality of Puurs-Sint-Amands
- Ruisbroek, Flemish Brabant, a village in the municipality of Sint-Pieters-Leeuw

== See also ==
- Jan van Ruysbroek (disambiguation)
