= Arrondissement of Mechelen =

Arrondissement of Mechelen Arrondissement Mechelen
- Arrondissement
- Location of the arrondissement in Antwerp
- Coordinates: 51.05°N 4.5°E
- Country: Belgium
- Region: Flanders
- Province: Antwerp
- Municipalities: 13 (until 2018); 12 (since 2019)

Area
  - Total: 510.22 km^{2} (197.00 sq mi)

Population (1 January 2017)
  - Total: 340,410
  - Density: 667.18/km^{2} (1,728.0/sq mi)
- Time zone: UTC+1 (CET)
  - Summer (DST): UTC+2 (CEST)

The Arrondissement of Mechelen (Dutch: Arrondissement Mechelen; French: Arrondissement de Malines) is one of the three administrative arrondissements in the Province of Antwerp, Belgium. It is both an administrative and a judicial arrondissement, as the territory for both coincides.

== History ==
The Arrondissement of Mechelen was created in 1800 as the third arrondissement in the Department of Deux-Nèthes (Dutch: Departement Twee Nethen). It originally comprised the cantons of Duffel, Heist-op-den-Berg, Lier, Mechelen and Puurs. In 1977, the then municipality of Muizen was added to the arrondissement from the Arrondissement of Leuven, and was merged into the City of Mechelen.

Per 1 January 2019, the municipalities of Puurs and Sint-Amands merged into the new municipality of Puurs-Sint-Amands.

== Municipalities ==
The Administrative Arrondissement of Mechelen consists of the following municipalities:

- Berlaar
- Bonheiden
- Bornem
- Duffel
- Heist-op-den-Berg
- Lier
- Mechelen
- Nijlen
- Putte
- Puurs-Sint-Amands
- Sint-Katelijne-Waver
- Willebroek
