= Oppuurs =

- Village
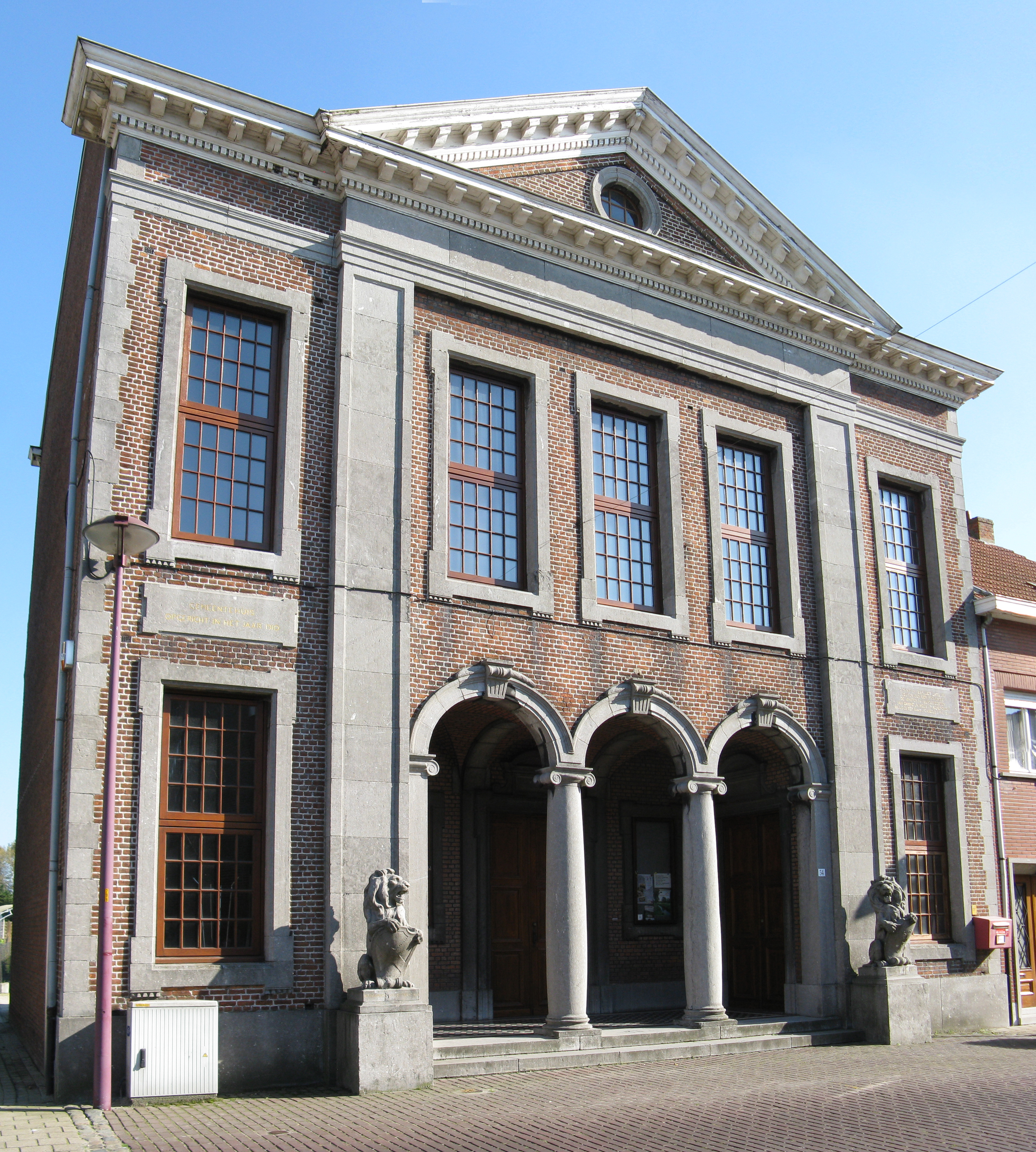
- Former town hall

- Location in Belgium
- Coordinates: 51°3′58.9″N 4°14′31.76″E
- Country: Belgium
- Region: Flemish Region
- Province: Antwerp
- Municipality: Puurs-Sint-Amands

Area
  - Total: 4.79 km^{2} (1.85 sq mi)

Population (2021)
  - Total: 2,048
  - Density: 428/km^{2} (1,110/sq mi)
- Time zone: CET

Oppuurs is a village in the Belgian province of Antwerp. It is a part of the municipality of Puurs-Sint-Amands. Oppuurs has 2,048 inhabitants as of 2021.

== History ==
Oppuurs is first mentioned in 1414, then called Oppuedersel. In the 15th century, it is owned by the Van der Calsteren family. Afterwards, Oppuurs becomes owned by the vander Meeren family, after which it becomes into the possession of Walburge van der Aa, lady of Oppuurs, who marries Joost Snoy in 1563. Although Walburge remarries after the death of Joost, Oppuurs come into the hands of the Snoy family through their son Philippus. On 22 March 1664, Philip IV grants Jean Charles Snoy the title of Baron and elevates Oppuurs to a Barony. In 1701, Charlotte Marie-Florence Snoy, Baroness of Oppuurs, marries Charles-Philippe d'Hangouart, who is a.o. Count (and later Marquess) of Avelin. Upon Charlotte's death in 1726, Charles-Philippe acquires Oppuurs and becomes the baron. The properties are put up for sale in 1777 by Francois Augustin d'Hangouart and purchased by Philippe Ghislain Snoy, who becomes the Baron of Oppuurs. Consequently, the Snoy family regains possession of Oppuurs. In 1795, however, the lordships are abolished and replaced by a new form of government with municipalities. On May 7, 1818, Idisbalda-Ghislain Snoy is appointed as mayor of Oppuurs by the king.

Oppuurs was part of the municipality of Puurs, and was separated from it in 1803. It was an independent municipality until 1976 when it became, along with Lippelo, part of the municipality of Sint-Amands.

== Demography ==
=== Evolution of the population ===
==== 19th century ====
Year	1806	1816	1830	1846	1856	1866	1876	1880	1890
Number of inhabitants	893	959	1023	983	959	936	1021	1039	1097
Remark:results from population census at 31 December

==== 20th century until 1976 ====
Year	1900	1910	1920	1930	1947	1961	1970	1976
Number of inhabitants	1066	1164	1200	1319	1478	1596	1692	1654
Remark:results from population census at 31 December

== Gallery ==
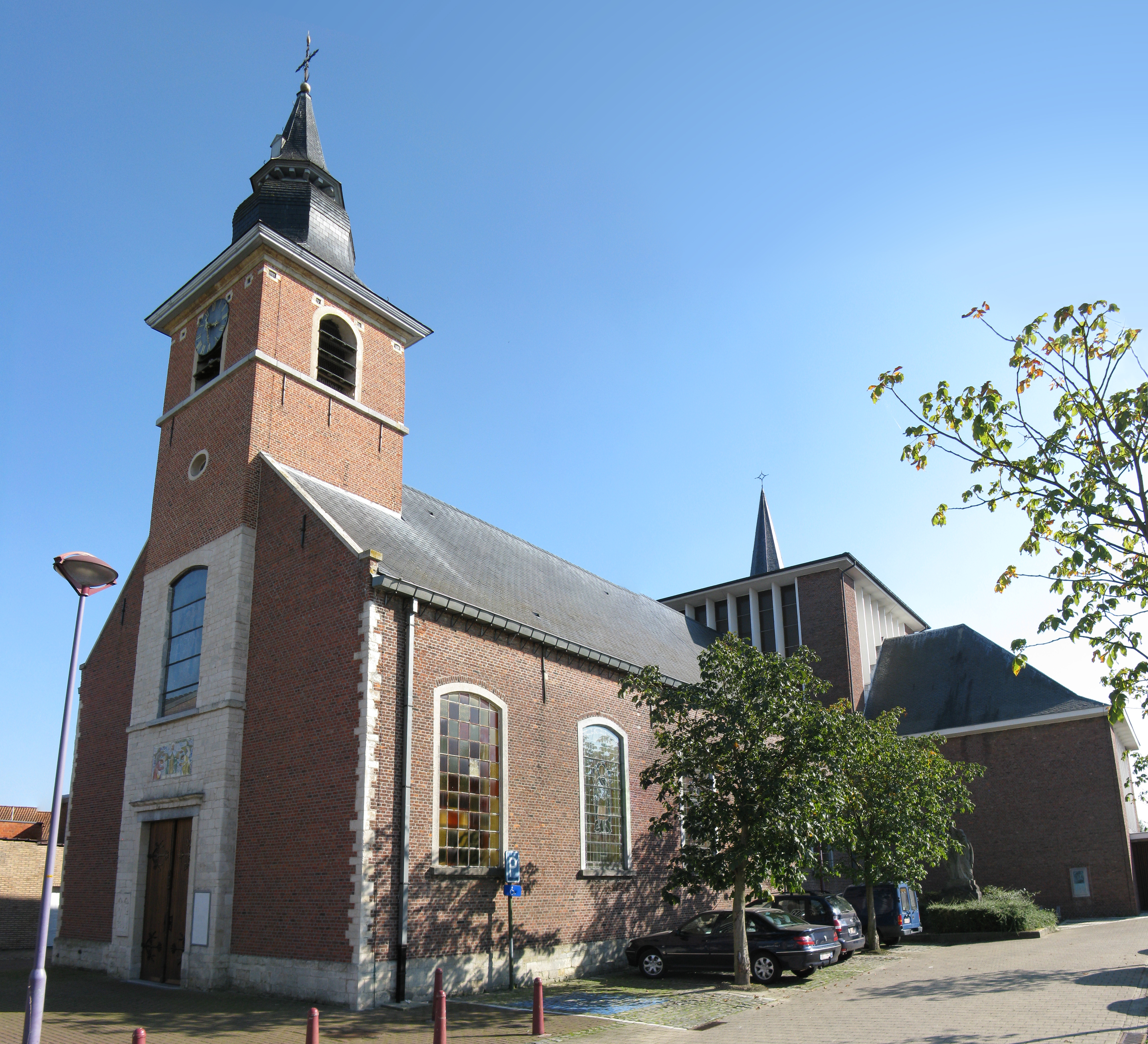
Church of Saints John and Amand

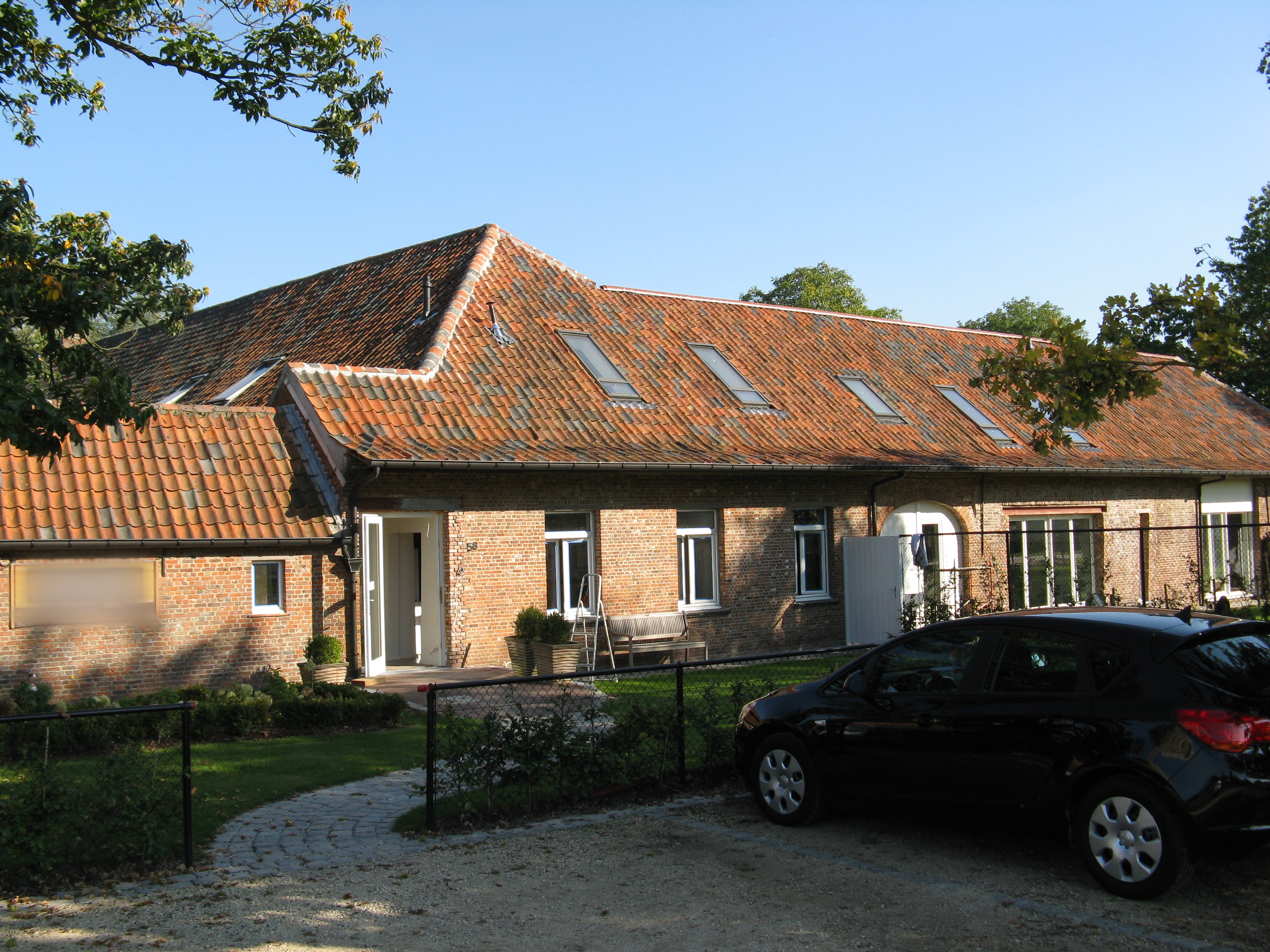
U-shaped farm

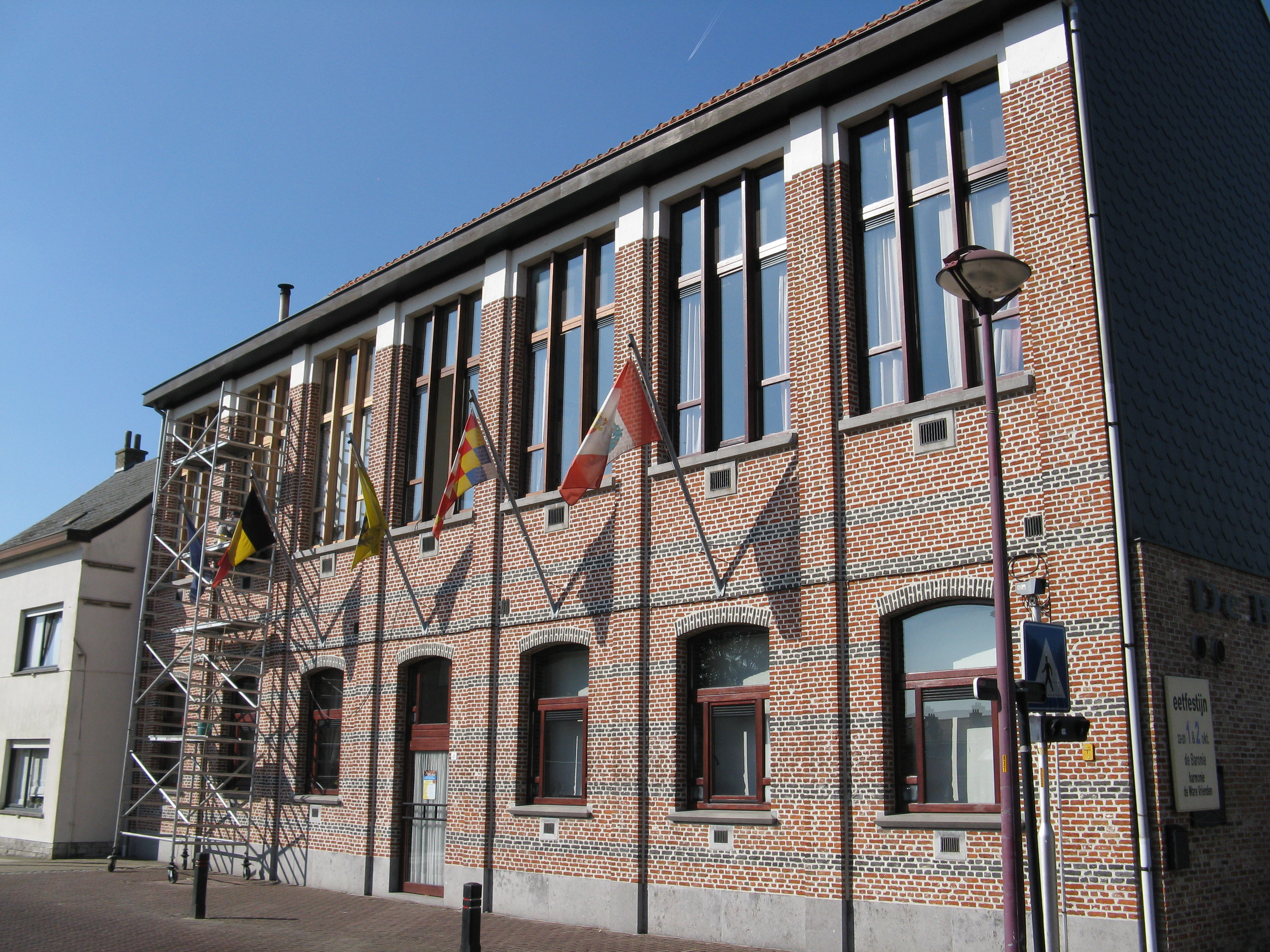
Former school

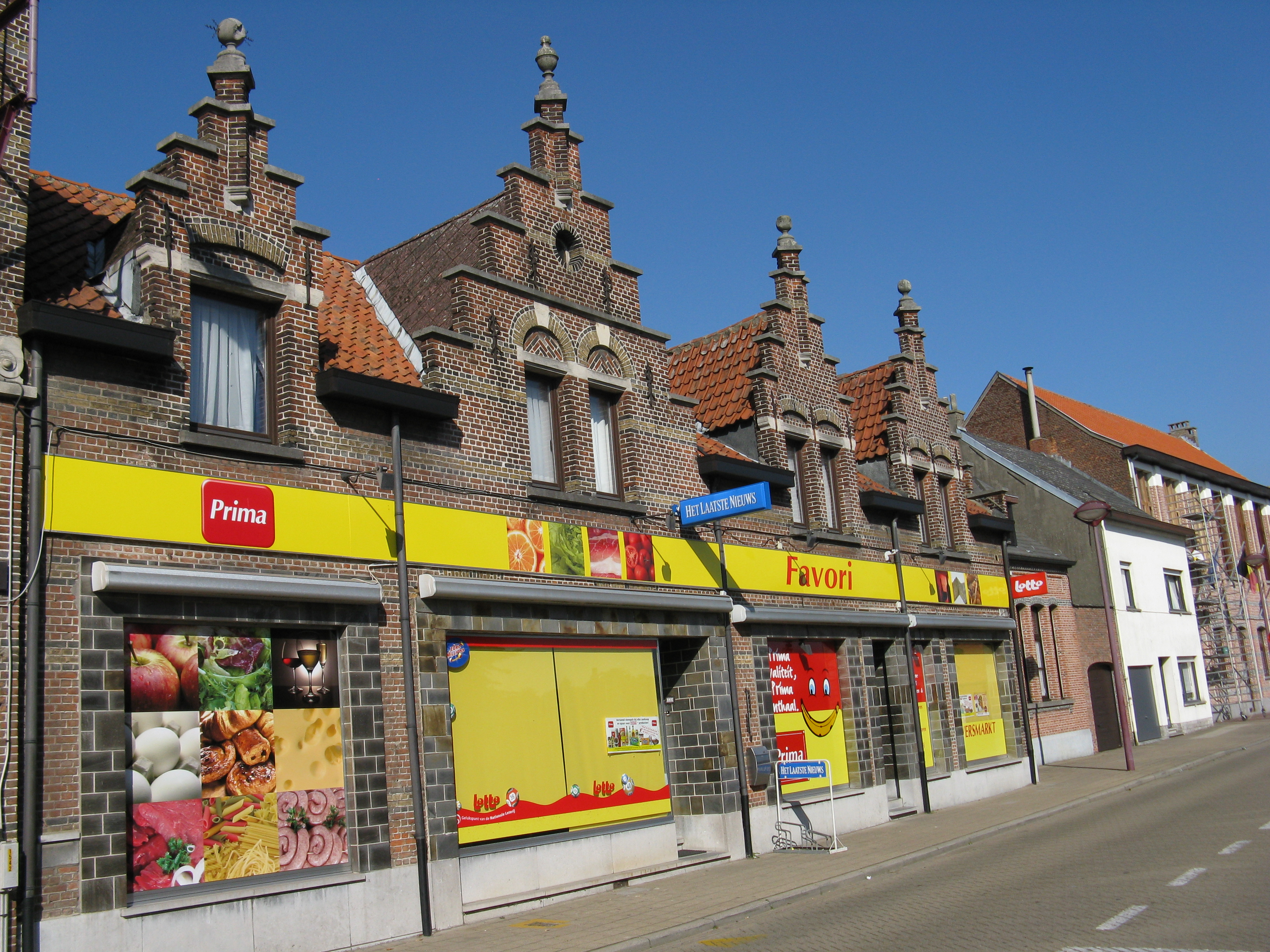
Shop in Oppuurs
