= Jan van Ruysbroek =

Jan van Ruysbroek is the name of:

- John of Ruusbroec (c. 1290–1381), Flemish scholar and mystic
- Jan van Ruysbroeck (architect) (15th century), Flemish architect

== See also ==
- Ruisbroek (disambiguation), two Belgian villages
