= Breendonk =

- Village
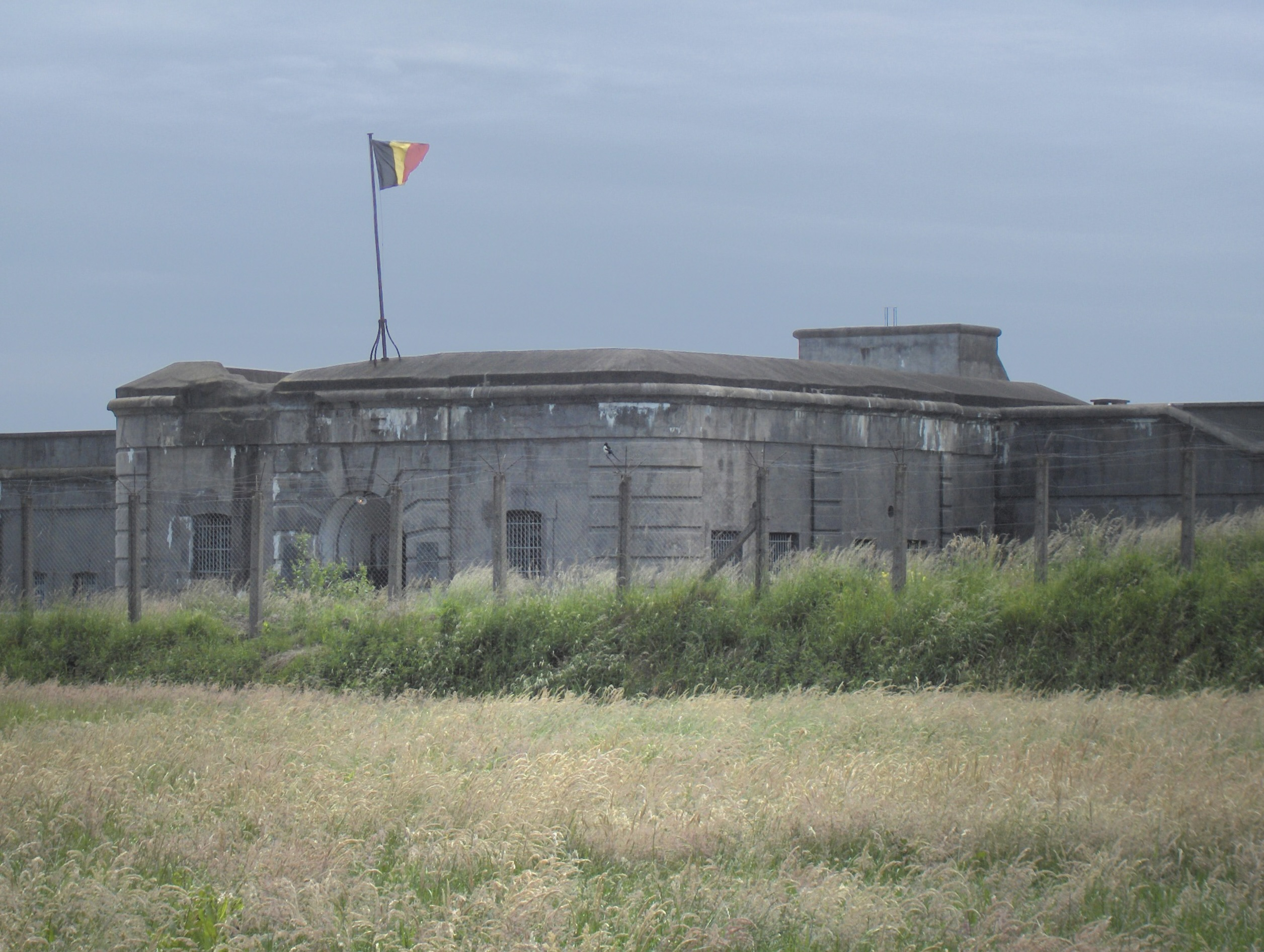
- Fort Breendonk

- Location in Belgium
- Coordinates: 51°03′N 4°20′E
- Country: Belgium
- Region: Flemish Region
- Province: Antwerp
- Municipality: Puurs-Sint-Amands

Area
  - Total: 6.43 km^{2} (2.48 sq mi)

Population (2021)
  - Total: 3,052
  - Density: 475/km^{2} (1,230/sq mi)
- Time zone: CET

Breendonk is a village in the municipality of Puurs-Sint-Amands in the province of Antwerp, Belgium, with a population of 3,000, halfway between Brussels and Antwerp.

== History ==
Its name stems from the medieval Bredene Dunc, which translates as "wide mound" or "a dry spot in the marshes."

In the 19th century, it was known for its beautiful Neo-Gothic church and the lavish mansion of the Earl de Buisseret. Both were destroyed by the Belgian army at the start of World War I because they obstructed the gunner's view from the local fortifications.

From the 20th century on, it was best known for its fortification at Fort Breendonk, built in 1909. It was judged that Antwerp, being continental Europe's second-most important port, needed two circles of fortifications for its defence. Breendonk's fortification was part of the outer defensive ring. These fortifications were built on the same site previously occupied by Roman fortifications; this site was selected because it was the only source of clean water in what, until the 18th century, was swampland. The modern fortifications fell to the Germans after only a seven-day siege.

During World War II, the fort was briefly used as the General Headquarters of King Leopold III, leading the Belgian armed forces. After his surrender to the Germans, it was transformed into a concentration camp by the Nazis (primarily as a transit camp for transport to Auschwitz). It gained a grim reputation as a place of torture and interrogation for a wide variety of prisoners. Among those to be incarcerated (about 3500 in total; 1733 didn't survive the war) were the linguist Herman Liebaers, fencer Jacques Ochs, Communist Party of Belgium politician Bert Van Hoorick, and anti-Nazi fascist Paul Hoornaert. About 300 people were killed in the camp, and at least 98 people died from deprivation or torture.

The fort is now home to the "Breendonk Fort National Memorial" which provides a historical record of the Nazi terror in Belgium. This museum is referenced for its historical significance in the W. G. Sebald novel Austerlitz.

Breendonk is now most famous for the Duvel Moortgat Brewery where the Belgian beer Duvel (meaning "Devil" in the local South Brabantian dialect of Dutch), is brewed. The brewery reputedly uses the same spring once used by the Romans and World War I fortifications.

The village of Breendonk was merged in 1977 into the municipality of Puurs, while the fort and surrounding area east of the A12 road (leading from Antwerp to Brussels) became part of the municipality of Willebroek.
