= Puurs-Sint-Amands =

- Municipality
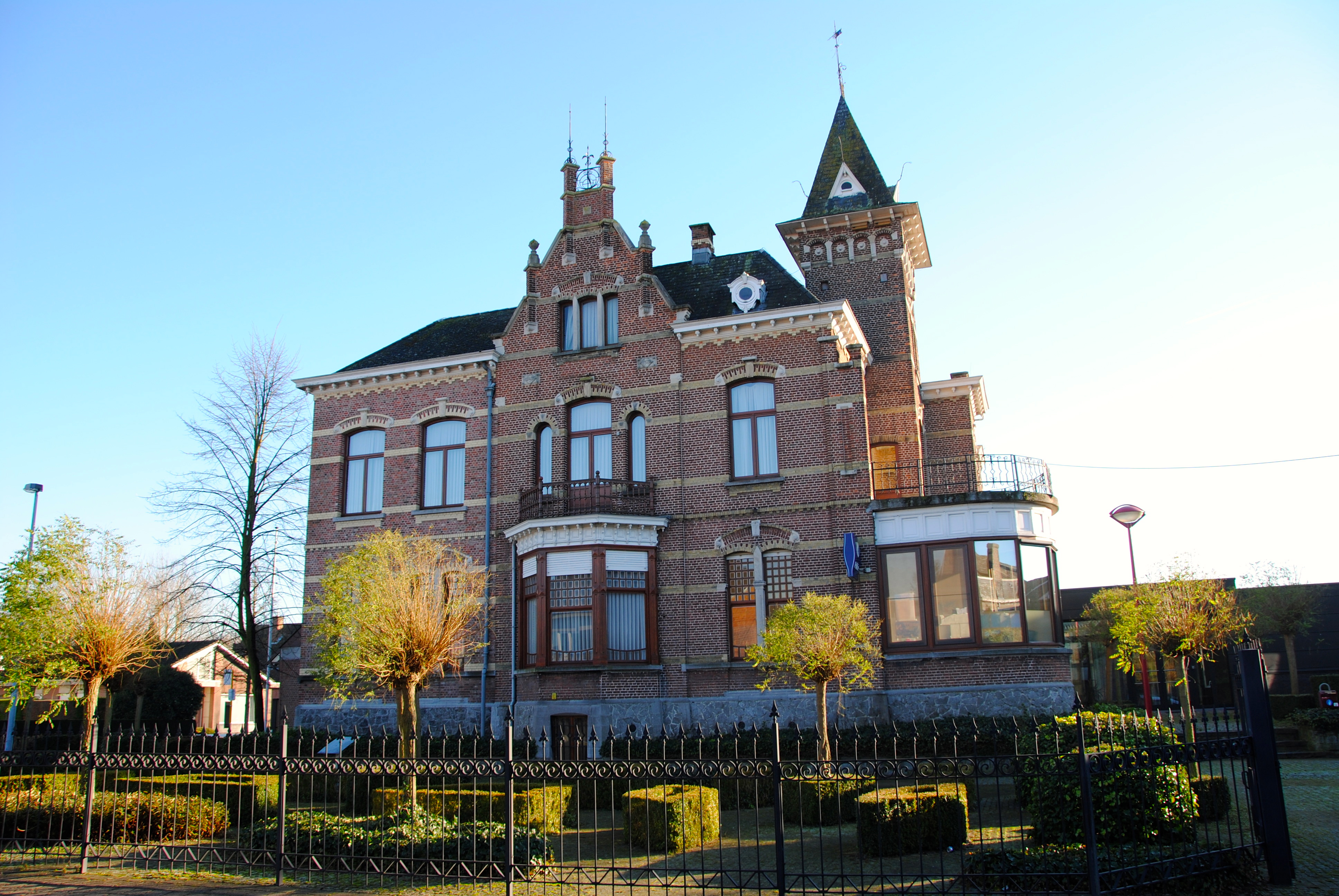
- Town hall of Sint-Amands

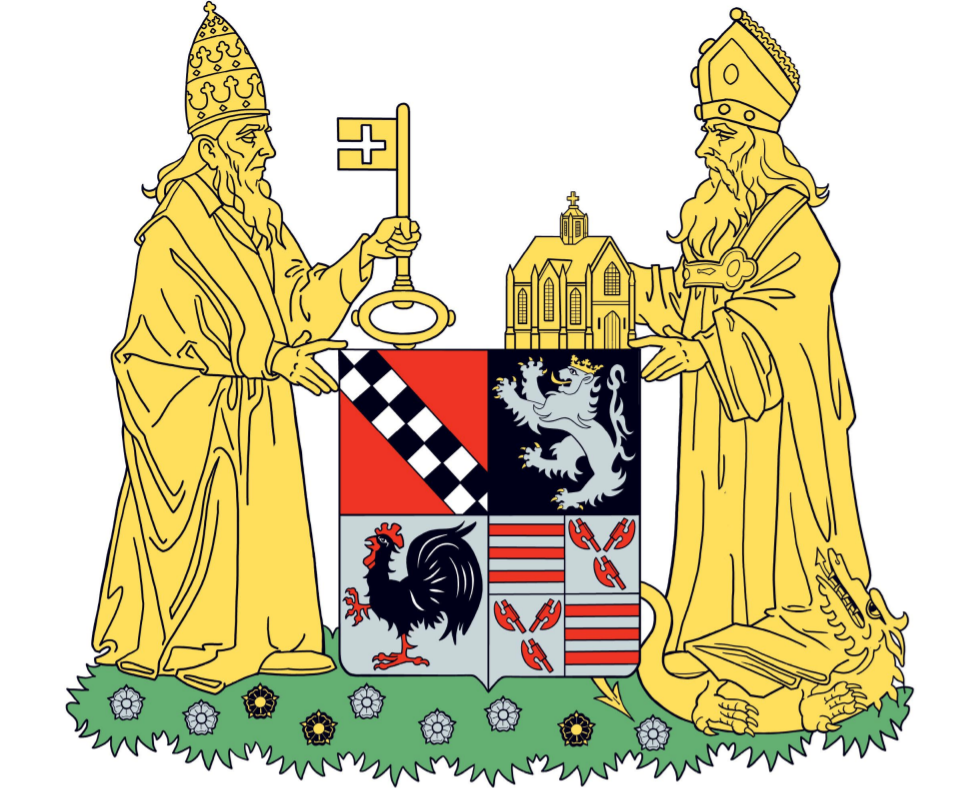
- Flag Coat of arms

- Location of Puurs-Sint-Amands in the province of Antwerp
- Interactive map of Puurs-Sint-Amands
- Location in Belgium
- Coordinates: 51.064°N 4.295°E
- Country: Belgium
- Community: Flemish Community
- Region: Flemish Region
- Province: Antwerp
- Arrondissement: Mechelen

Government
  - Mayor: Koen Van den Heuvel (CD&V)
  - Governing party: CD&V

Area
  - Total: 49.14 km^{2} (18.97 sq mi)

Population (2021-01-01)
  - Total: 26,208
  - Density: 533.3/km^{2} (1,381/sq mi)
- Postal codes: 2870, 2890
- NIS code: 12041
- Area codes: 03, 052
- Website: puurs-sint-amands.be

Puurs-Sint-Amands (Dutch pronunciation: [ˈpyːr ˌsɪnt ɑˈmɑnts]) (Note: Puurs in isolation: [pyːrs].) is a municipality in the Belgian province of Antwerp that arose on 1 January 2019 from the merging of the municipalities of Puurs and Sint-Amands.

The merged municipality has an area of 48.99 km^{2} and has a population of 26,208 people as of 2021. Puurs-Sint-Amands consists of the following deelgemeentes (sub-municipalities): Breendonk, Liezele, Lippelo, Puurs, Oppuurs, Ruisbroek, Sint-Amands.

Together with Bornem, the area forms a region known as Little Brabant.

== Creation ==
The Flemish Government provides incentives for municipalities to voluntarily merge. The municipal councils of Puurs and Sint-Amands approved a merge in principle on 18 September 2017. Definitive approval occurred on 20 November 2017, which was ratified by Flemish decree of 4 May 2018 alongside several other merges, all to be effective per 1 January 2019.

As of 1 January 2018, the municipality of Puurs had a population of 17,452 and Sint-Amands a population of 8,480.

== Government ==
The first elections for the new municipality were held during the regular local elections of 14 October 2018, electing a municipal council for the legislative period of 2019–2024. CD&V obtained a majority of seats in the municipal council (17 out of 29). Koen Van den Heuvel, who was mayor of Puurs until then, became mayor of Puurs-Sint-Amands.

== Gallery ==
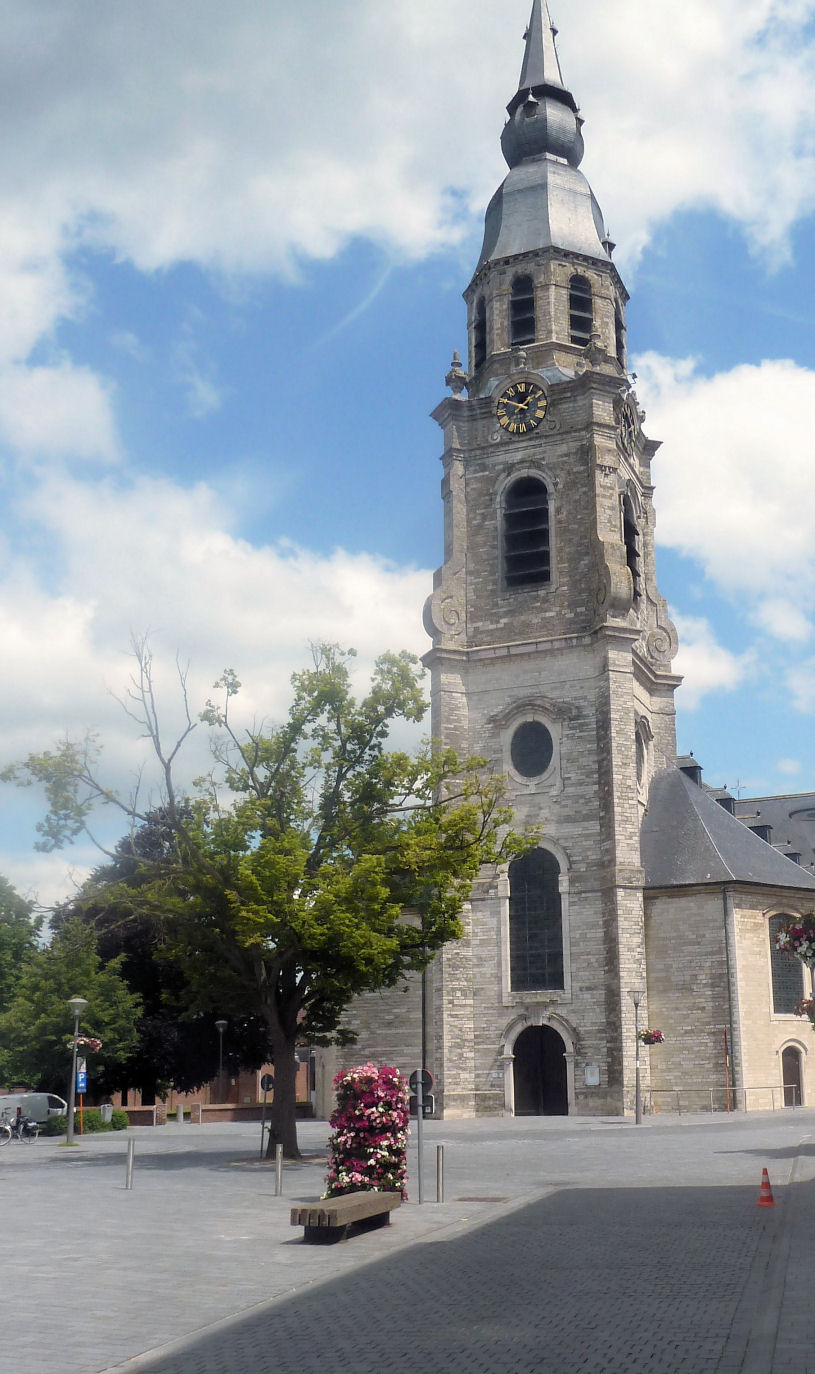
St Peter's Church, Puurs

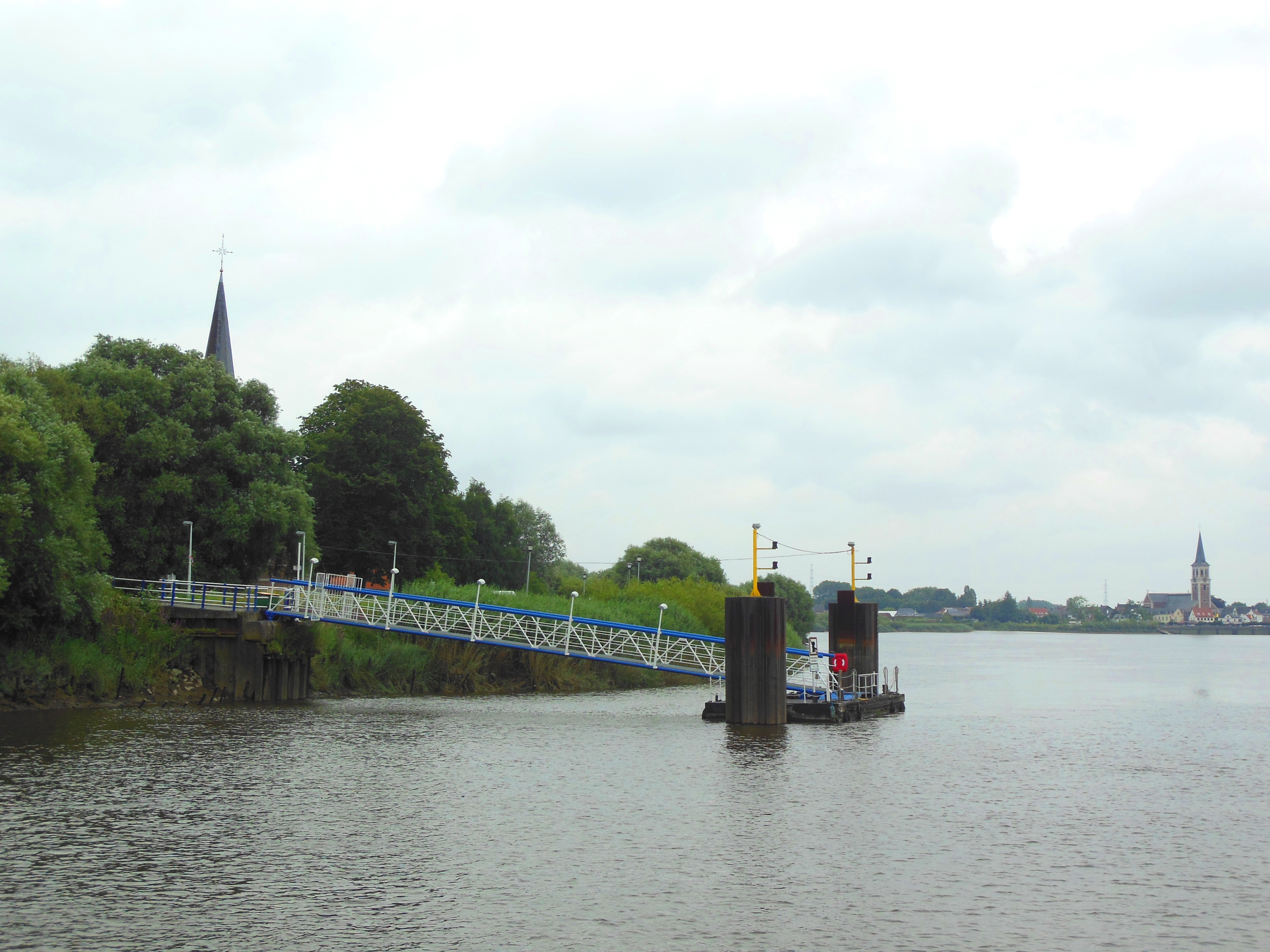
View on Mariekerke and Sint-Amands

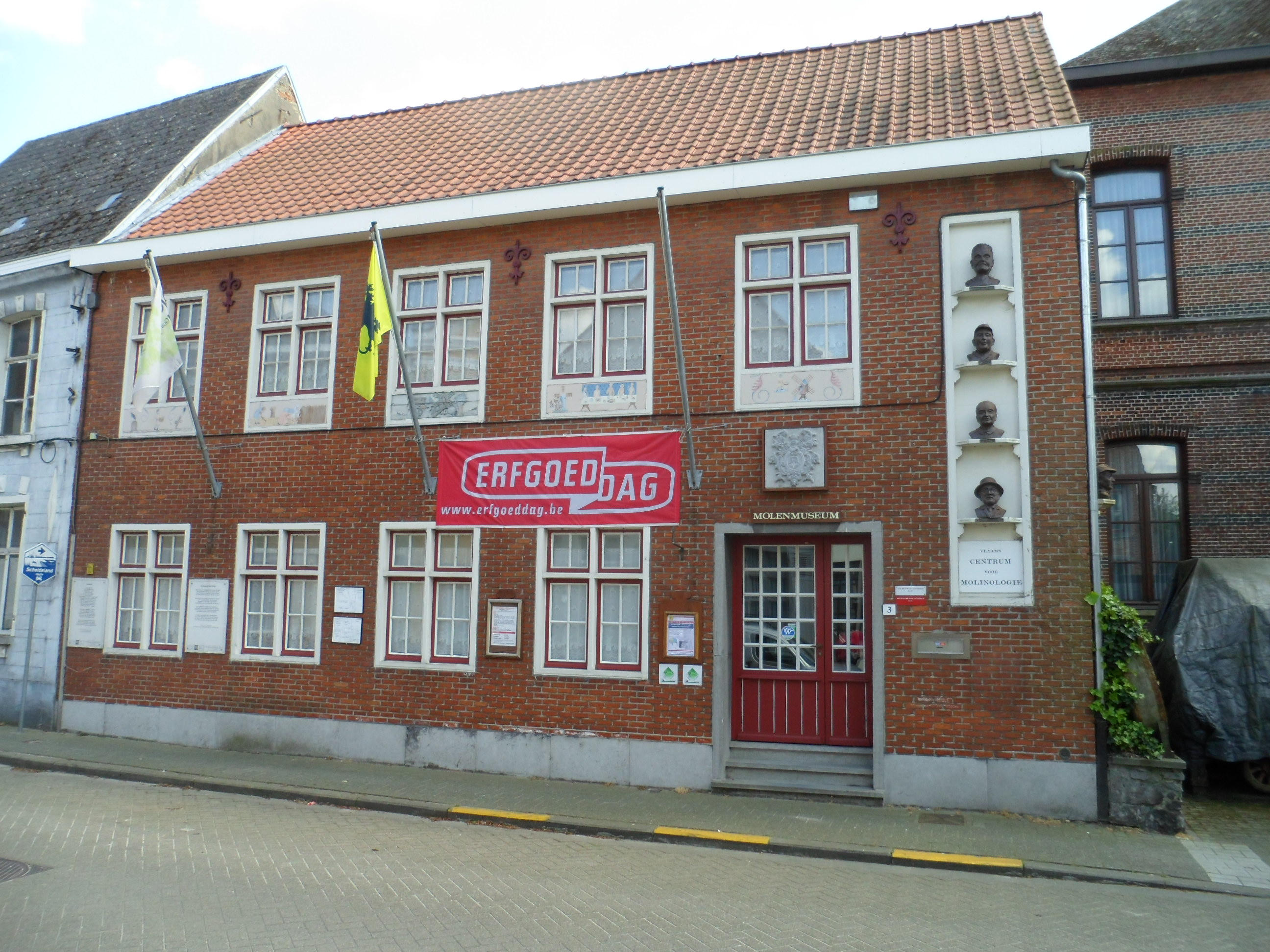
Windmill museum in Sint Amands

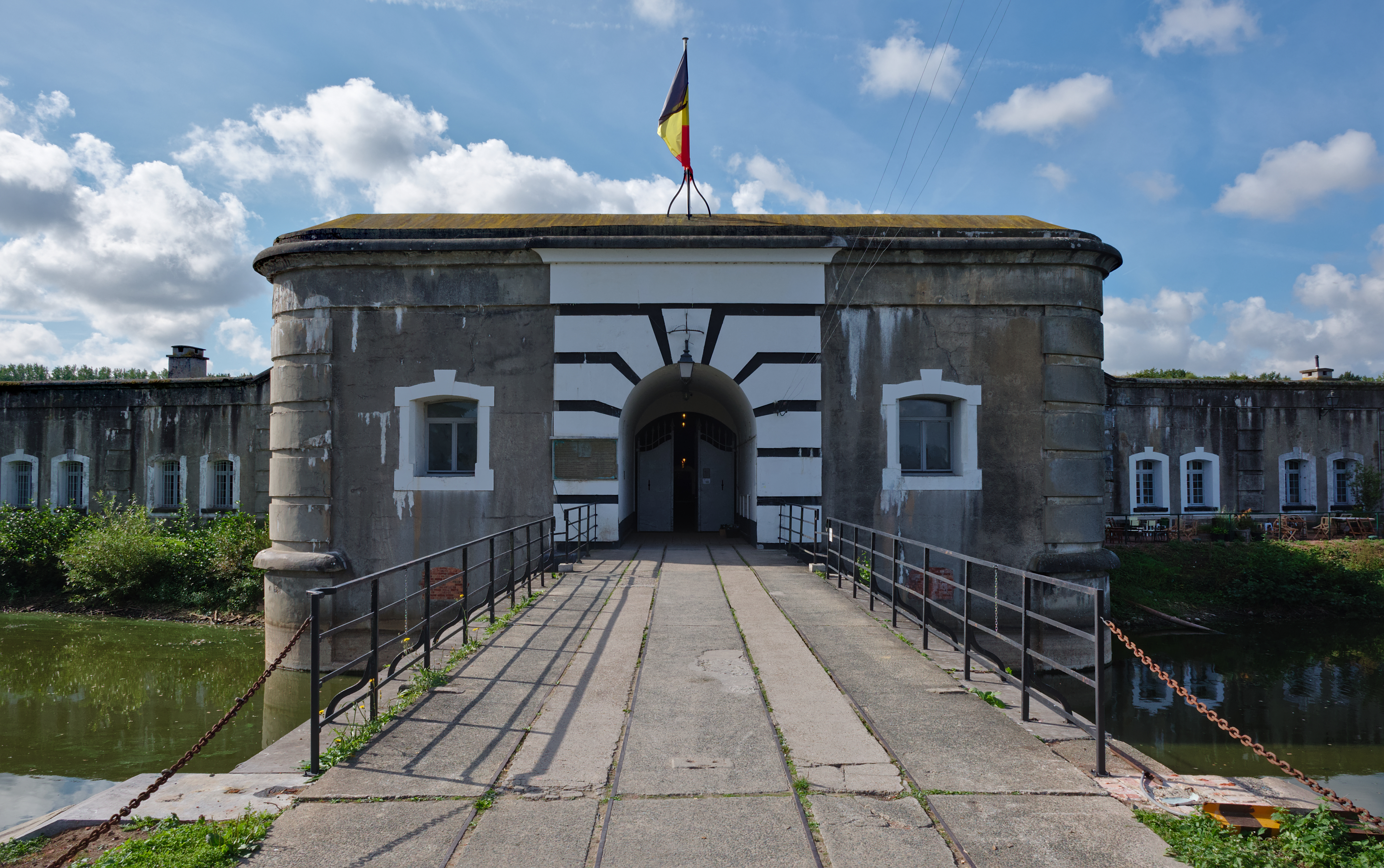
Fort of Liezele
