= Bert Van Hoorick =

Belgian politician and writer

- Born: 31 January 1915; Aalst, Belgium
- Died: 19 February 2000 (aged 85)
- Occupations: politician, writer

Bert Van Hoorick (31 January 1915 – 19 February 2000) was a Belgian politician and writer. He was a member of the Belgian parliament from 1946 up to 1949 and from 1958 until 1976. When 18 years old, he joined the Belgian socialist party and also the Socialist Anti-War Lique and in the late thirties the Communist Party of Belgium, of which he became a leading member.

During the second world war Van Hoorick became a member of the resistance. He was apprehended by the Nazis in January 1943 and imprisoned in the Nazi concentration camps of Breendonk and Buchenwald. After the war he became chief editor of De Rode Vaan, the journal of the Belgian communist party. In 1946 he was elected to the municipal council of Aalst and to the Belgian parliament. After the events of the Hungarian Revolution of 1956, he broke with the communist party and in January 1957 he became a member of the Belgian socialist party. In 1958, he became a member of parliament for the socialist party, and he held this mandate until 1976. From 1971 up to 1974 he was also secretary of the parliament.

== Awards ==
- 1983 – Arkprijs van het Vrije Woord
- 1991 – Gouden Erepenning van het Vlaams Parlement

== Bibliography ==
- In tegenstroom. Herinneringen 1919–1956

== Sources ==
- Bert Van Hoorick
