= Jan Ferguut =

Flemish poet and writer

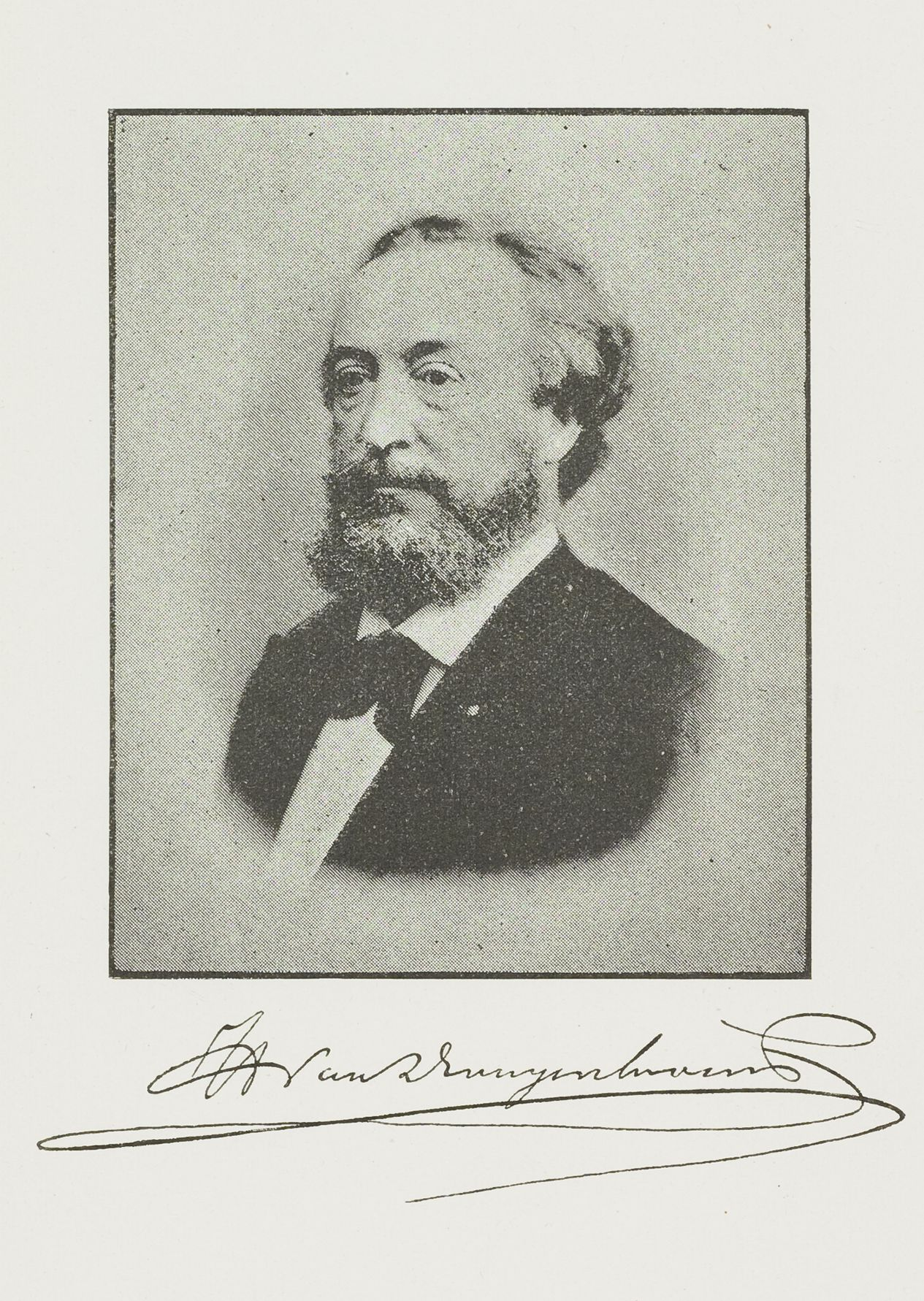
Jan Van Droogenbroeck

Jan Amandus Van Droogenbroeck (Sint-Amands, 17 January 1835 - Schaerbeek, 27 May 1902), pseudonym Jan Ferguut, was a Flemish poet and writer. He was a teacher and a civil servant.

He was a pupil of Jan Van Beers at the Normaalschool in Lier, and a follower of Johan Michiel Dautzenberg. Jan Van Droogenbroeck contributed to the magazines De Toekomst, Noord en Zuid, and Het Nederlandsch Tijdschrift.

Streets were named after him in Schaerbeek and Sint-Amands.

== Bibliography ==
- Makamen en ghazelen (1866)
- Ondine (1867
- Dit zijn zonnestralen (1873)
- Torquato Tasso's dood (1873) – Torquato Tasso
- Camoens (1879) – Camoens
- De morgen (1887)
- Spreuken en sproken (1891)
- Gedichten (1894)

== See also ==
- Flemish literature

== Sources ==
- Joannes Amandus van Droogenbroeck (Dutch)
- Jan Van Droogenbroeck (Dutch)
- Daems, S., 'J.A. van Droogenbroeck (Jan Ferguut)', Winkler-Prinzlexicon (1887).
- Muyldermans, J., 'Levensschets van Jan van Droogenbroeck', Jaarboek der Koninklijke Vlaamse Academie 22 (1908).
- van den Bossche, M., 'Bibliografie van en over J.A. van Droogenbroeck, alias Jan Ferguut', Heemkundig Jaarboek Klein-Brabant (1971) 43-64.
- Wittebols, J., 'Over dichter Jan van Droogenbroeck en mijn oude bloemlezingen', Tijdingen Beatrijsgezelschap 14 (1978-1979) nr. 4, p. 20-29.
