= Klein-Brabant =

Area in Belgium

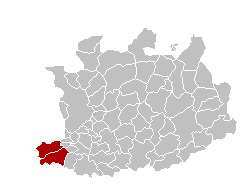
Location of Klein-Brabant within Antwerp province

Klein-Brabant ("Little Brabant") is a Flemish region in the Belgian province of Antwerp. It includes the municipalities of Bornem and Puurs-Sint-Amands. The region is also a police zone, named Politiezone Klein-Brabant.

The region got a lot of attention during and after the broadcasting of the Eén series Stille Waters. The yearly Dodentocht and the Schelde Internationale Muziekstroom-route also contribute to the image of the region.
