= Ruisbroek, Antwerp =

Ruisbroek
- Village
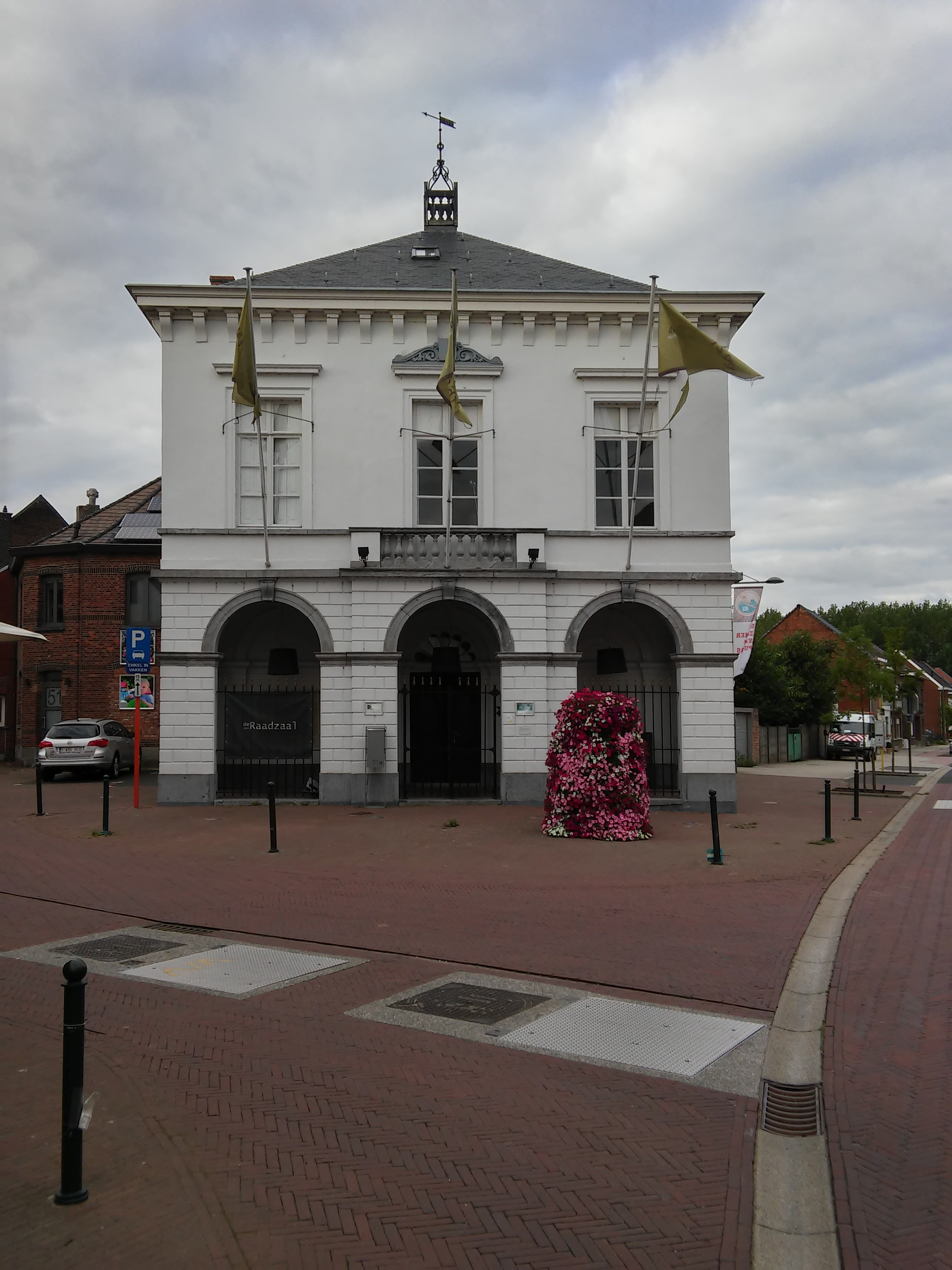
- The former town hall, Museum de Bres until 2009

- Location in Belgium
- Coordinates: 51.088°N 4.330°E
- Country: Belgium
- Region: Flemish Region
- Province: Antwerp
- Municipality: Puurs-Sint-Amands

Area
  - Total: 9.01 km^{2} (3.48 sq mi)

Population (2021)
  - Total: 5,015
  - Density: 557/km^{2} (1,440/sq mi)
- Time zone: CET

Ruisbroek is a village in the municipality of Puurs-Sint-Amands located in the Antwerp Province of Belgium.

Ruisbroek was an independent municipality until 1977, when it was merged into Puurs. In 2019, Puurs itself was merged into Puurs-Sint-Amands.

== Floods ==
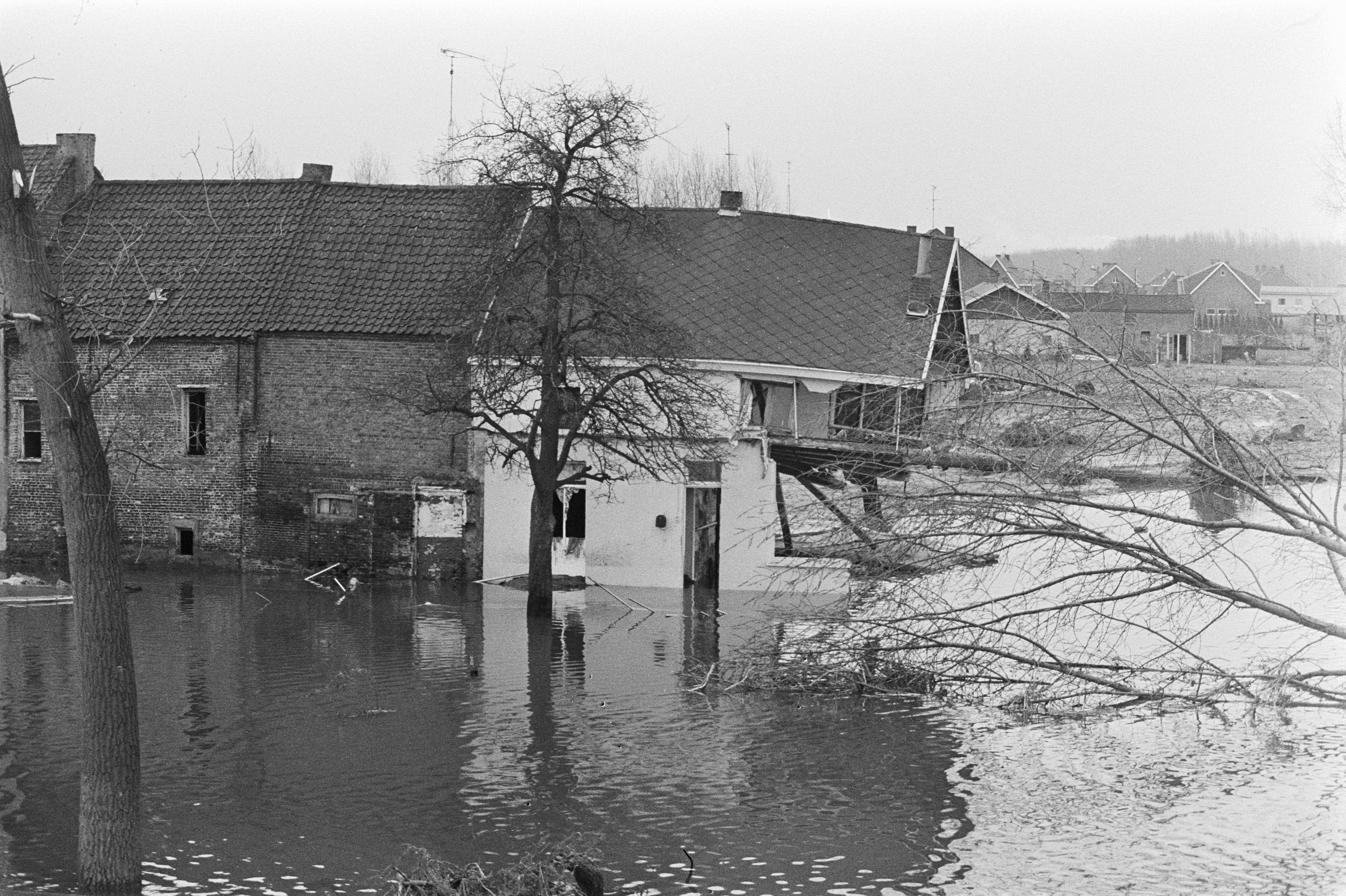
Ruisbroek (14 January 1976)

Ruisbroek is a polder village protected by dikes which has often seen severe flooding. In 1820, a complete neighbourhood was flooded, and was rebuilt north of the Rupel River. The last flood which occurred was a result of the gale of January 1976. The dike broke over a distance of 100 metres, and flooded part of the village. King Baudouin of Belgium visited the town on 6 January 1976. During his visit he was confronted with an angry crowd and accusations. De Waterhoek monument indicates the height the water reached.
