= Dodentocht =

Annual walking event in Belgium

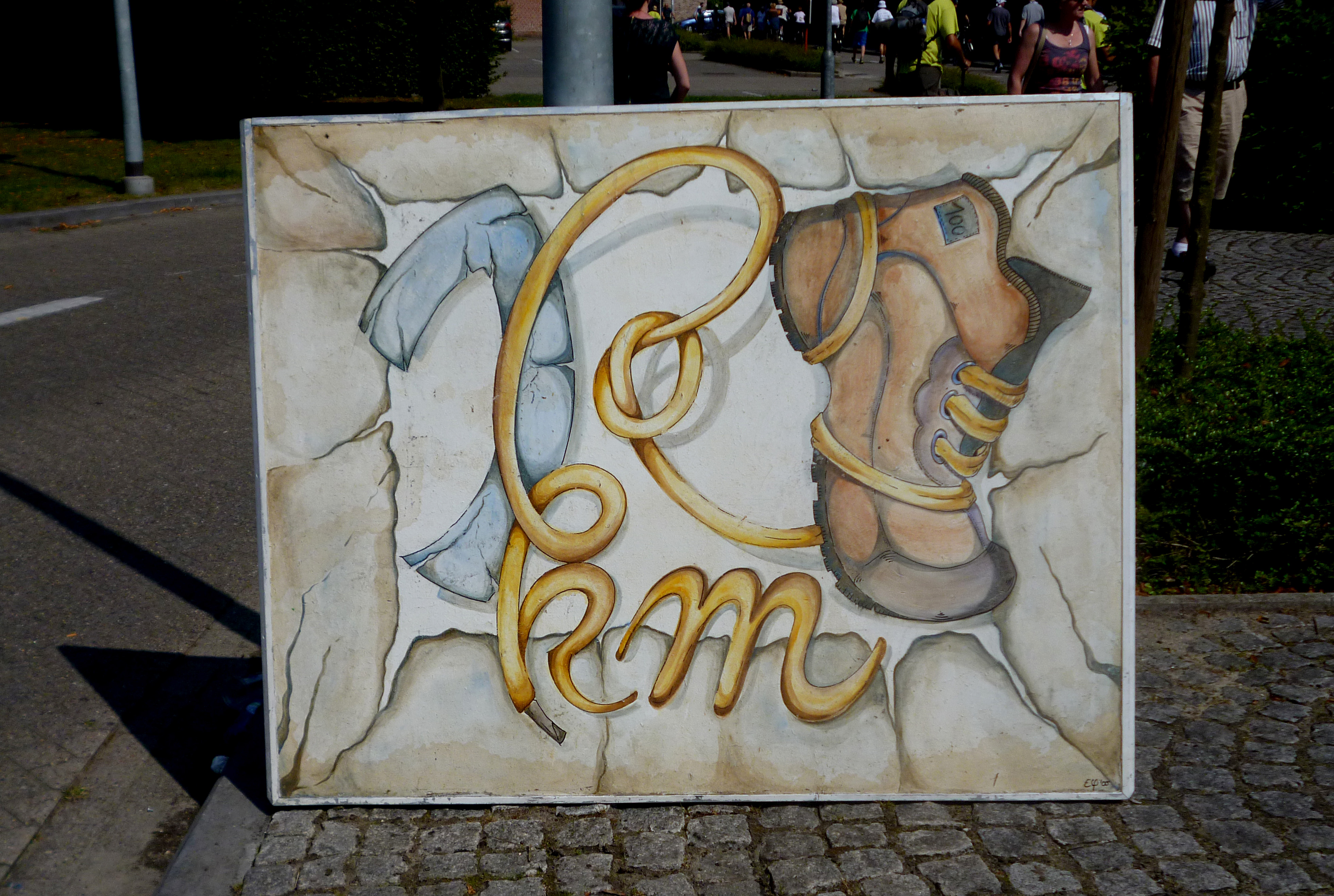
The last kilometer of the Dodentocht

The Dodentocht (Dutch for Death March) is a long-distance march of 100 kilometers organized annually since 1970 in Bornem, Belgium. The grueling march derives its name from its length. Each year since 2009, the event has attracted over 10,000 participants. A scouting group also organises a campsite for the participants, which can hold 500 people.

== History ==
The Dodentocht has become one of the most important hiking events in Europe. It began in 1970 with 65 participants and has since grown into an event with up to 13,000 hikers. Marchers have come from many countries, including the United States, the United Kingdom and Germany.

The Dodentocht is organised by the non profit organisation 100 km Dodentocht® Kadee Bornem. Approximately 600 members of the organisation are involved during the event itself. During the 2012 edition, marchers were followed on the official site via a tracking system, utilizing small RFID tags on badges worn on their clothing that are automatically scanned at each of the 15 checkpoints and at additional random points along the route. Many of the marchers return year after year; in 2019 Hugo Bonnyns finished the march for the 48th time, the current record.

The organizers have adopted a motto, "Walking for a better world"; many of the participants walk for charities.

Since the course is closed for non-participants, some of the churches along the route have been forced to reschedule church services; the pastor of the local federation of churches, Pastor Maervoet, participated in the march in 2009, for the fifth time.

Local companies that support the event have led to some unique features. The route passes through the premises of several companies. These include, at 15 km, the factory of a popular sports drink, at 40 km, the Duvel brewery in Breendonk – with free beer for all walkers.

On August 14, 2010, a walker collapsed 300 meters short of the finish line and died from cardiac arrest. The walker had already walked the Dodentocht 5 times and was properly trained. The event was not cancelled, but the festivities celebrating the arrival of the last walkers did not take place.

Since 2018 a limit has been set on the number of participants. The number became too large and the organization wanted to be able to continue to guarantee proper functioning of the event. In 2019 the 13,000 places were sold in a matter of hours.

In the days leading up to the 53rd Dodentocht in August 2022, it was announced by the organisers, at the request of the Belgium government, that the event would not continue in its current format due to the ongoing heatwave at the time. In response, the length of the route was reduced by approximately a 1/3 to 63.6km to be completed by 1pm the following day. All participants who successfully completed the shortened route received the Dodentocht medal and diploma.

== Awards ==
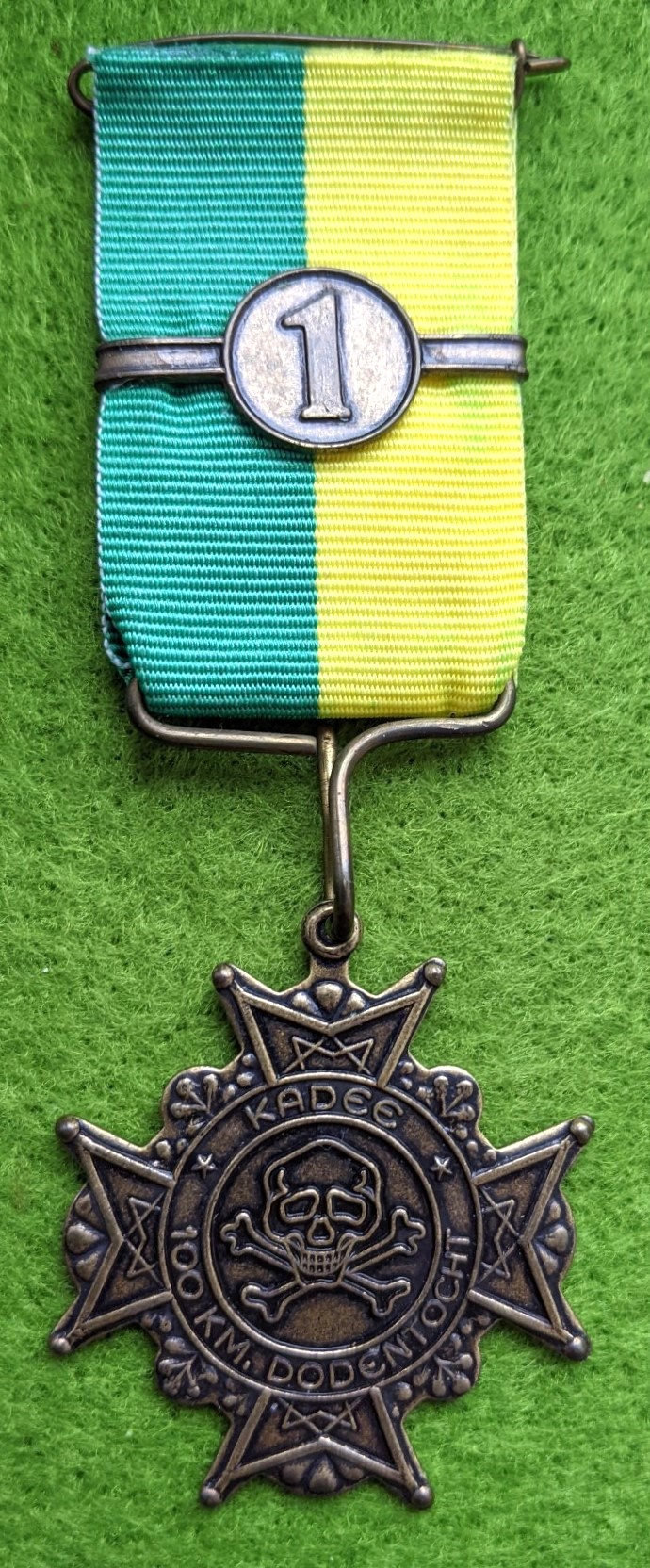
Medal for first completion

There are no rankings or records. If a walker completes the route in under 24 hours then they are awarded a certificate confirming their timings, a medal, badge and a large gingerbread.

== Participants ==
| Edition | Year | Participants |
|---|---|---|
| 1 | 1970 | 65 |
| 2 | 1971 | 202 |
| 3 | 1972 | 397 |
| 4 | 1973 | 782 |
| 5 | 1974 | 1,047 |
| 6 | 1975 | 1,408 |
| 7 | 1976 | 1,844 |
| 8 | 1977 | 2,057 |
| 9 | 1978 | 2,102 |
| 10 | 1979 | 2,487 |
| 11 | 1980 | 2,508 |
| 12 | 1981 | 2,848 |
| 13 | 1982 | 3,136 |
| 14 | 1983 | 3,208 |
| 15 | 1984 | 3,125 |
| 16 | 1985 | 3,828 |
| 17 | 1986 | 3,920 |
| 18 | 1987 | 4,518 |
| 19 | 1988 | 4,567 |
| 20 | 1989 | 4,761 |
| 21 | 1990 | 4,366 |
| 22 | 1991 | 4,930 |
| 23 | 1992 | 5,084 |
| 24 | 1993 | 5,091 |
| 25 | 1994 | 5,203 |
| 26 | 1995 | 4,826 |
| 27 | 1996 | 4,967 |
| 28 | 1997 | 5,509 |
| 29 | 1998 | 5,310 |
| 30 | 1999 | 6,644 |
| 31 | 2000 | 7,096 |
| 32 | 2001 | 8,053 |
| 33 | 2002 | 8,131 |
| 34 | 2003 | 8,717 |
| 35 | 2004 | 9,033 |
| 36 | 2005 | 8,595 |
| 37 | 2006 | 8,413 |
| 38 | 2007 | 8,958 |
| 39 | 2008 | 9,597 |
| 40 | 2009 | 10,793 |
| 41 | 2010 | 10,605 |
| 42 | 2011 | 10,507 |
| 43 | 2012 | 10,957 |
| 44 | 2013 | 11,157 |
| 45 | 2014 | 11,861 |
| 46 | 2015 | 12,017 |
| 47 | 2016 | 12,608 |
| 48 | 2017 | 13,952 |
| 49 | 2018 | 11,752 |
| 50 | 2019 | 13,045 |
| 51 | 2020 | 0 – Cancelled due to COVID-19 Pandemic |
| 52 | 2021 | 0 – Cancelled due to COVID-19 Pandemic |
| 53 | 2022 | 10,438 – Route shortened to 63.6km due to heatwave |
| 54 | 2023 | 11,500 |
| 55 | 2024 | 12,312 |
| 56 | 2025 | 12,643 |

== See also ==
- International Four Days Marches Nijmegen
- Kennedy march
