= Lippelo =

- Village
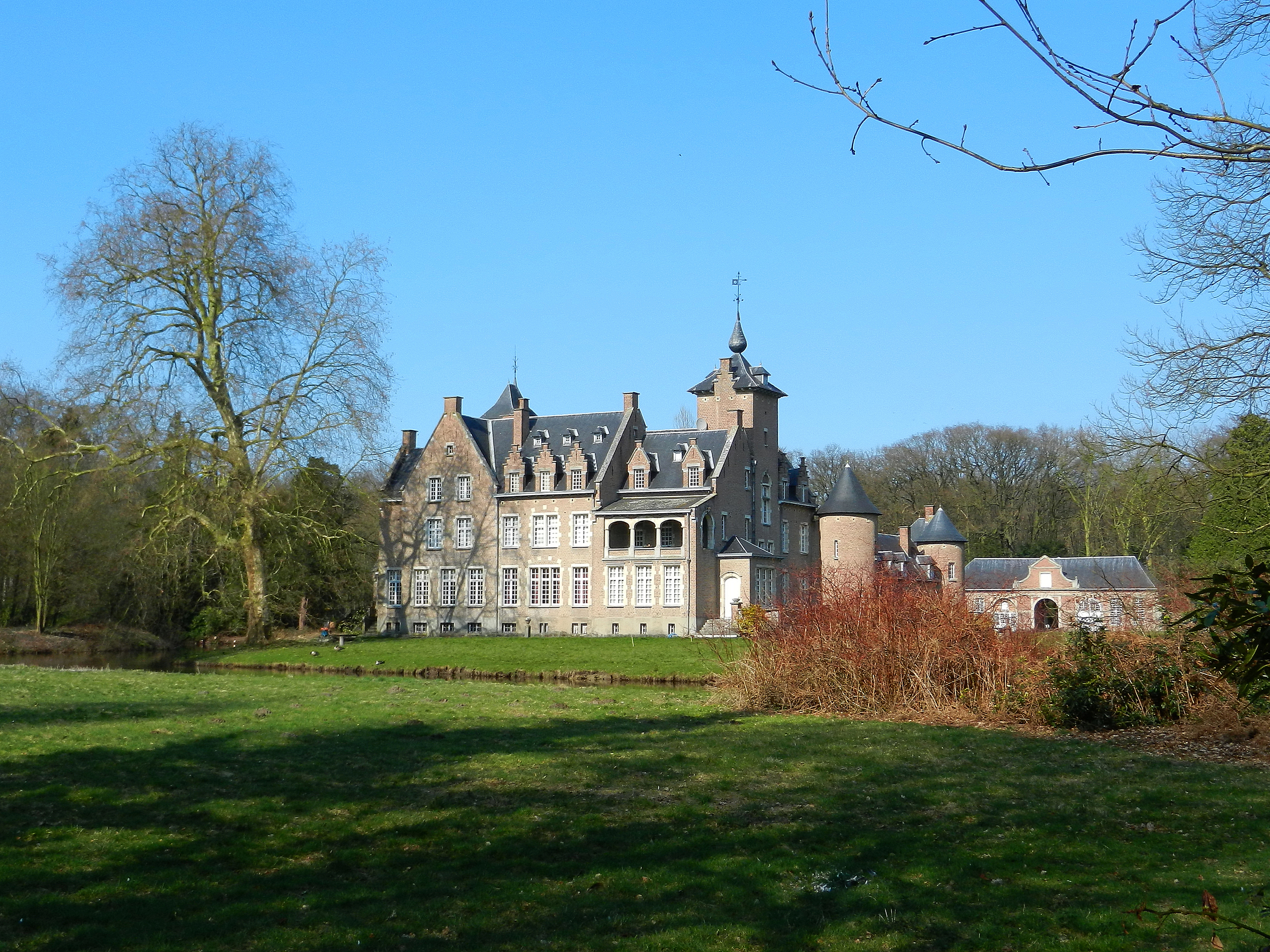
- Hof te Melis

- Location in Belgium
- Coordinates: 51°2′31.5″N 4°15′30.62″E
- Country: Belgium
- Region: Flemish Region
- Province: Antwerp
- Municipality: Puurs-Sint-Amands

Area
  - Total: 4.19 km^{2} (1.62 sq mi)

Population (2021)
  - Total: 1,138
  - Density: 272/km^{2} (703/sq mi)
- Time zone: CET

Lippelo is a village in the Belgian province of Antwerp. It is a part of the municipality of Puurs-Sint-Amands. Lippelo has a population of 1,138 as of 2021.

== History ==
Lippelo was an independent municipality until 1976. Then, it became, along with Oppuurs, part of the municipality of Sint-Amands.

== Demography ==
=== Evolution of the population ===
==== 19th century ====
Year	1806	1816	1830	1846	1856	1866	1876	1880	1890
Number of inhabitants	515	528	626	577	570	633	688	680	669
Remark:results from population census at 31 December

==== 20th century until 1976 ====
Year	1900	1910	1920	1930	1947	1961	1970	1976
Number of inhabitants	696	702	686	705	794	792	944	975
Remark:results from population census at 31 December
