= Minister of the Colonies (Belgium) =

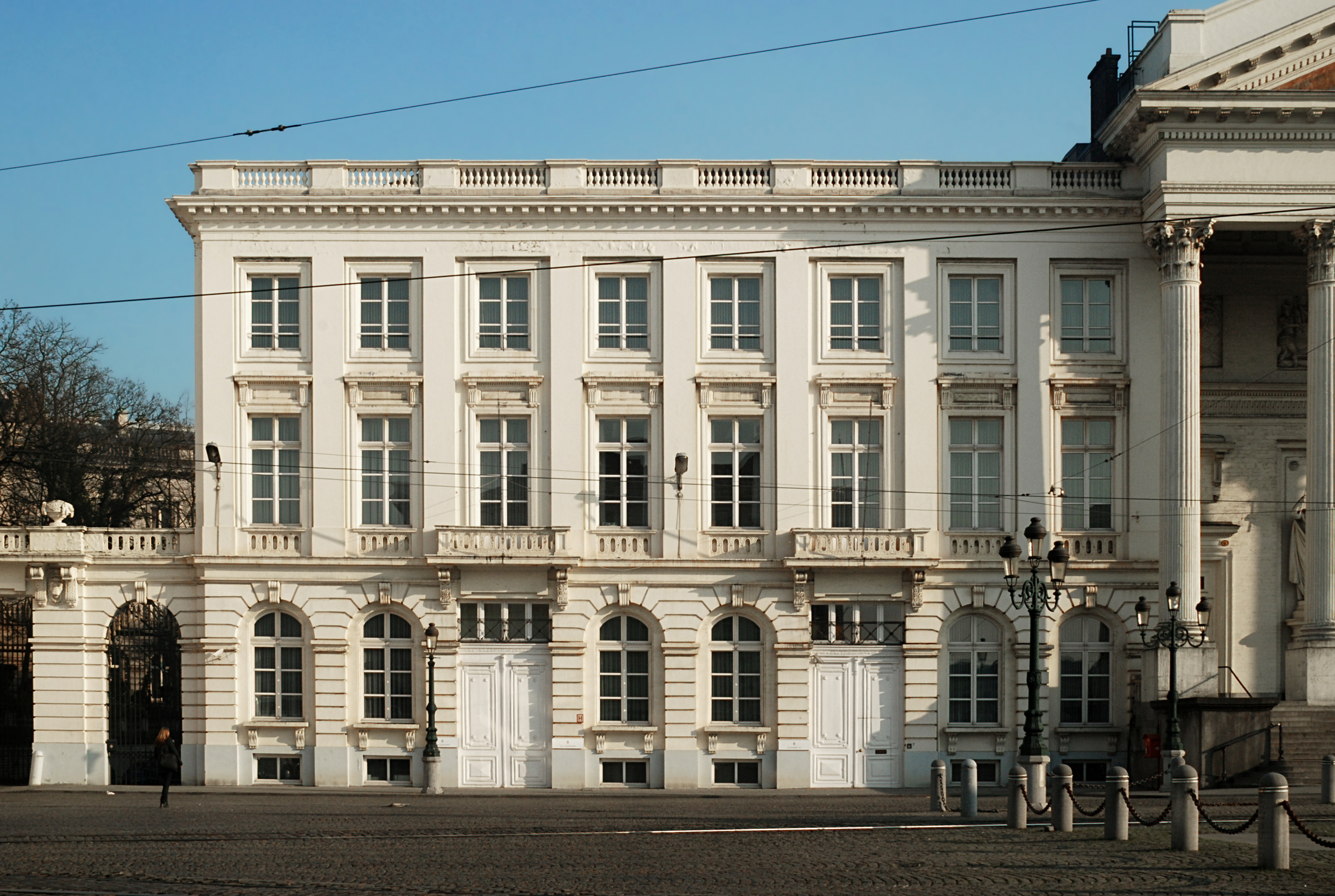
The former building of the Ministry of the Colonies between 1924 and 1960 at 7, Place Royale in Brussels, Belgium

The Belgian Minister of the Colonies (French: Ministre des Colonies, Dutch: Minister van Koloniën) was a Belgian parliamentarian who was responsible for the territories of the colonial empire in Central Africa from 1908 to 1962, comprising the colony of the Belgian Congo (1908–60) and the international mandate of Ruanda-Urundi (1916–62). The exact title was changed on several occasions.

== Ministerial title ==
For most of the existence of the post, office holders were known as "Minister of the Colonies" (Ministre des Colonies or Minister van Koloniën). From the accession of Maurits Van Hemelrijck in November 1958, however, the ministerial title changed to "Minister of the Belgian Congo and Ruanda-Urundi" (Ministre du Congo belge et du Ruanda-Urundi or Minister van Belgisch-Congo en Ruanda-Urundi). On 30 June 1960, with the independence of the Belgian Congo, the title changed to "Minister of African Affairs" (Ministre des affaires africaines or Minister van afrikaanse zaken) whose only office holders were August de Schryver and Harold Charles d'Aspremont Lynden.

In addition to official colonial ministers, two individuals served as ministers without portfolio with a colonial brief between 1959 and 1960. Raymond Scheyven was "Minister without portfolio, charged with the economic and financial affairs of the Belgian Congo and Ruanda-Urundi" (Note: Scheyven held the unique position of Minister without portfolio, charged with the economic and financial affairs of the Belgian Congo and Ruanda-Urundi (Ministre sans portefeuille, chargé des Affaires économiques et financières du Congo Belge et du Ruanda-Urundi or Minister zonder portefeuille, belast met de economische en financiële zaken van Belgisch-Kongo en Ruanda-Urundi).) while Walter Ganshof van der Meersch was "Minister without portfolio, charged with general affairs in Africa". (Note: Ganshof van der Meersch held the unique ministerial position of "Minister without portfolio, charged with general affairs in Africa (Ministre sans portefeuille, chargé des affaires générales en Afrique or minister zonder portefeuille, belast met de algemene zaken in Afrika).)

== List of ministers ==
The following is a list of ministers, cited by historian Guy Vanthemsche in his book Belgium and the Congo, 1885-1980:

Political parties

Christian Democrat

Catholic Party, later:
Christian Social Party

Liberal

Liberal Party

Socialist

Belgian Socialist Party

Portrait	Name	Term of office			Political party	Prime Minister	Monarch (Reign)
Portrait	Name	Took office	Left office	Time in office	Political party	Prime Minister	Monarch (Reign)
	Jules Renkin	30 October 1908	21 November 1918	10 years, 22 days	Catholic Party	Frans Schollaert; Charles de Broqueville; Gérard Cooreman	Albert I (1909–34)
	Louis Franck	21 November 1918	11 March 1924	5 years, 111 days	Liberal Party	Léon Delacroix; Henri Carton de Wiart; Georges Theunis	Albert I (1909–34)
	Henri Carton de Tournai	11 March 1924	20 May 1926	2 years, 70 days	Catholic Party	Georges Theunis; Aloys Van de Vyvere; Prosper Poullet	Albert I (1909–34)
	Maurice Houtart (First term)	20 May 1926	15 November 1926	179 days	Catholic Party	Henri Jaspar	Albert I (1909–34)
	Édouard Pecher (Note: Both Édouard Pecher and Edmond Rubbens died in office.)	16 November 1926	27 December 1926	41 days	Liberal Party	Henri Jaspar	Albert I (1909–34)
	Maurice Houtart (Second term)	29 December 1926	18 January 1927	20 days	Catholic Party	Henri Jaspar	Albert I (1909–34)
	Henri Jaspar (First term)	18 January 1927	19 October 1929	2 years, 274 days	Catholic Party	Own government	Albert I (1909–34)
	Paul Tschoffen (First term)	19 October 1929	24 December 1929	66 days	Catholic Party	Henri Jaspar	Albert I (1909–34)
	Henri Jaspar (Second term)	27 February 1930	18 June 1931	1 year, 111 days	Catholic Party	Own government	Albert I (1909–34)
	Paul Charles	18 May 1931	16 August 1931	90 days	Extra-Parliamentary (Catholic)	Henri Jaspar; Jules Renkin	Albert I (1909–34)
	Paul Crokaert	6 June 1931	25 May 1932	354 days	Catholic Party	Jules Renkin	Albert I (1909–34)
	Paul Tschoffen (Second term)	23 May 1932	13 November 1934	2 years, 174 days	Catholic Party	Jules Renkin; Charles de Broqueville	Albert I (1909–34)
	Paul Charles (Second term)	20 November 1934	25 March 1935	125 days	Extra-Parliamentary (Catholic)	Georges Theunis	Albert I (1909–34)
	Edmond Rubbens	25 March 1935	27 April 1938	3 years, 33 days	Catholic Party	Paul van Zeeland; Paul-Émile Janson	Leopold III (1934–44)
	Albert De Vleeschauwer (First term)	15 May 1938	22 February 1939	283 days	Catholic Party	Paul-Henri Spaak	Leopold III (1934–44)
	Gaston Heenen	21 February 1939	16 April 1939	54 days	Extra-Parliamentary (Catholic)	Hubert Pierlot	Leopold III (1934–44)
	Albert De Vleeschauwer (Second term)	16 April 1939	31 January 1945	5 years, 290 days	Catholic Party	Hubert Pierlot	Leopold III (1934–44)
	Edgard De Bruyne	12 February 1945	16 June 1945	124 days	Catholic Party	Achille Van Acker	Prince Charles Regent (1944–50)
	Robert Godding (First term)	2 August 1945	18 February 1946	200 days	Liberal Party	Achille Van Acker	Prince Charles Regent (1944–50)
	Lode Craeybeckx	13 March 1946	20 March 1946	7 days	Belgian Socialist Party	Paul-Henri Spaak	Prince Charles Regent (1944–50)
	Robert Godding (Second term)	31 March 1946	11 March 1947	345 days	Liberal Party	Achille Van Acker; Camille Huysmans	Prince Charles Regent (1944–50)
	Pierre Wigny	20 March 1947	12 August 1950	3 years, 145 days	Christian Social Party	Paul-Henri Spaak; Gaston Eyskens; Jean Duvieusart	Prince Charles Regent (1944–50)
	André Dequae	15 August 1950	12 April 1954	3 years, 240 days	Christian Social Party	Gaston Eyskens; Jean Duvieusart; Joseph Pholien; Jean Van Houtte	Baudouin (1950–93)
	Auguste Buisseret	23 April 1954	2 June 1958	4 years, 40 days	Liberal Party	Achille Van Acker; Gaston Eyskens	Baudouin (1950–93)
	Léo Pétillon (Note: A career civil servant in the colonial service, Pétillon had previously served as Governor-General of the Belgian Congo from 1952 to 1958.)	5 July 1958	6 November 1958	124 days	Extra-Parliamentary (Catholic)	Gaston Eyskens	Baudouin (1950–93)
	Maurice Van Hemelrijck	6 November 1958	2 September 1959	300 days	Christian Social Party	Gaston Eyskens	Baudouin (1950–93)
	August De Schryver	3 September 1959	2 September 1960	365 days	Christian Social Party	Gaston Eyskens	Baudouin (1950–93)
	Raymond Scheyven	17 November 1959	2 September 1960	290 days	Christian Social Party	Gaston Eyskens	Baudouin (1950–93)
	Walter Ganshof van der Meersch	16 May 1960	20 July 1960	65 days	Extra-Parliamentary	Gaston Eyskens	Baudouin (1950–93)
	Harold Charles d'Aspremont Lynden	2 September 1960	27 March 1961	206 days	Christian Social Party	Gaston Eyskens	Baudouin (1950–93)

== See also ==
- Federal Public Service Foreign Affairs
- Bibliothèque Africaine, overseen by the ministry starting in 1908
- Archives Africaines (Belgium), containing 5 km of colonial ministry-related records
- List of prime ministers of Belgium
- List of Belgian monarchs
- List of heads of state of the Democratic Republic of the Congo
- List of presidents of Burundi
- List of presidents of Rwanda

== Bibliography ==
- Vanthemsche, Guy (2012). Belgium and the Congo, 1885-1980. Cambridge: Cambridge University Press. ISBN 978-0-521-19421-1.
- Vanhove, Julien (1968). Histoire du Ministère des Colonies (PDF). Brussels: Royal Academy for Overseas Sciences.
