= August De Boodt =

Minister of Reconstruction
- In office 16 August 1950 – 15 January 1952
- Monarchs: Leopold II; Baldwin
- Preceded by: André Dequae
- Succeeded by: Albert Coppé

Senator Mechelen-Turnhout
- In office 1936–1968

Councillor Turnhout
- In office 1936–1946

Personal details
- Born: Augustus Franciscus Joseph De Boodt; 30 December 1895 Nieuwmunster, Belgium
- Died: 21 March 1986 (aged 90) Turnhout, Belgium
- Party: Christian Democratic and Flemish (CVP)
- Spouse: Pauline Vermeylen
- Children: 5

Augustus Franciscus Joseph De Boodt (Nieuwmunster, December 30, 1895, Turnhout, March 21, 1986) was from 1936 to 1968, senator District Mechelen – Turnhout. He was a member of the CVP (now CD&V). He was Councilor Turnhout from 1936 to 1946. In 1950, he was appointed Minister of Reconstruction by Joseph Pholien.

== Biography ==
=== Early life and career ===
De Boodt did his secondary school studies at the Episcopal College of Menin and was promoted to an agricultural engineer (1921) to the University of Leuven. He was an active member and senior of the UCL student club Moeder Meense

De Boodt married Pauline Vermeylen and became the father of five children. He went to work for the Farmers and settled in Turnhout, he was the promoter of agricultural and livestock improvements in De Kempen, where he resided with his family at domain Zwart Goor 1 – 2330 Merksplas, a townhouse in Turnhout's town square during the week and an appartement in Brussels for his political functions. He founded several agricultural associations.

From 1936 to 1946, he was a Councilor for Turnhout.

=== Senator (1936–1968) ===
In 1936, he was elected senator for the Catholic District Mechelen – Turnhout and held this office until 1968. In parliament, he participated in the work of the Centre Harmel.

=== Minister (1950–1952) ===
In 1950, he was Minister of Reconstruction in the homogeneous CVP Government of Joseph Pholien (August 1950 – January 1952), which came to power after the settlement of the Royal Question. He joined the government to strengthen the group of Flemish-oriented politicians (André Dequae, Geeraard Van Den Daele, Paul Willem Segers, Albert Coppé), in response to the Flemish side of the settlement.

These Ministers, a few days after their appointment, participated in the annual IJzerbedevaart. On the eve of that pilgrimage wrote De Boodt the sum of 1 million francs in his budget for reconstruction of the dynamited tower, today, the IJzertoren is still a symbol of Flemish nationalism and a symbol to remember the cruelties that happen during wars, thus a symbol of peace.

De Boodt's name is engraved on the tower, for his national contributions and bringing his country justice during a time of chaos. He is Freeman of Tessenderlo, a descendant of Anselmus de Boodt.

== Honours ==
- Belgium: Minister of Reconstruction, by Royal Decree.
- Belgium: Commander in the Order of Leopold.
- Belgium: Knight Grand Cross in the Order of the Crown.
- Belgium: Honorary citizen of Tessenderlo

== Sources ==
- Herman Todts, August De Boodt The 25-year senator , in: The Standard, December 6, 1961.
- Herman Todts, Senator De Boodt was 70 years , in: The Standard, January 3, 1966.
- Paul VAN MOLLE, The Belgian Parliament, 1894-1972 , Antwerp, 1972.
- Jean-Marie Lermyte others, August De Boodt , in: New Encyclopedia of the Flemish Movement, Tielt, 1998.
- Wouter Beke, The Soul of a column: the Christian People's Party 1945-1968 , Leuven, 2005.
