= 1950 Belgian general election =

← 1949	4 June 1950	1954 →

212 seats in the Chamber of Representatives
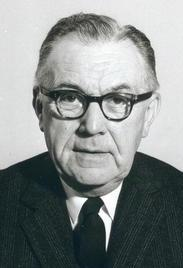

	First party	Second party	Third party
Leader	Jean Duvieusart	Max Buset	Roger Motz
Party	Christian Social	Socialist	Liberal
Leader since	Candidate for PM	1945	1945
Last election	105 seats, 43.55%	66 seats, 29.76%	29 seats, 15.25%
Seats won	108	73	20
Seat change	▲3	▲7	▼9
Popular vote	2,356,608	1,705,781	556,102
Percentage	47.68%	34.51%	11.25%
Swing	▲4.13%	▲4.76%	▼4.00%
	Fourth party	Fifth party
Leader	Edgard Lalmand	N/A
Party	Communist	LSK
Leader since	1943	N/A
Last election	12 seats, 7.49%	New
Seats won	7	4
Seat change	▼5	New
Popular vote	234,541	87,252
Percentage	4.75%	1.77%
Swing	▼2.74%	New
- Chamber seat distribution by constituency
Government before election
G. Eyskens I
CVP/PSC-Lib
Government after election
Duvieusart
Christian Social

General elections were held in Belgium on 4 June 1950. The result was a victory for the Christian Social Party, which won 108 of the 212 seats in the Chamber of Representatives and 54 of the 106 seats in the Senate. Voter turnout was 92.6%. This election was the last one in Belgian history where a single party achieved an absolute majority. Elections for the nine provincial councils were also held.

The elections took place a few months after the divisive referendum on returning King Leopold III from exile and restoring his monarchial duties (the Royal Question). Following the election, a single-party Catholic government was formed with Jean Duvieusart as Prime Minister, who oversaw the return of King Leopold III, but who was quickly succeeded by Joseph Pholien as Prime Minister, following strikes and protests due to Leopold's return, which ultimately led to his abdication.

== Results ==
=== Chamber of Deputies ===
Party	Votes	%	Seats	+/–
Christian Social Party	2,356,608	47.68	108	+3
Belgian Socialist Party	1,705,781	34.51	73	+7
Liberal Party	556,102	11.25	20	–9
Communist Party of Belgium	234,541	4.75	7	–5
Liberal–Socialist Kartels	87,252	1.77	4	+4
Cosmocraten	1,535	0.03	0	0
Belgian Patriotic Party	656	0.01	0	0
Independents	332	0.01	0	0
Total	4,942,807	100.00	212	0
Valid votes	4,942,807	94.70		
Invalid/blank votes	276,471	5.30		
Total votes	5,219,278	100.00		
Registered voters/turnout	5,635,452	92.62		
Source: Belgian Elections

=== Senate ===
Party	Votes	%	Seats	+/–
Christian Social Party	2,210,712	47.19	54	0
Belgian Socialist Party	1,631,368	34.82	37	+4
Liberal Party	526,575	11.24	10	–4
Communist Party of Belgium	229,093	4.89	3	–2
Liberal–Socialist Kartels	86,801	1.85	2	+2
Independents	262	0.01	0	0
Total	4,684,811	100.00	106	0
Valid votes	4,684,811	94.34		
Invalid/blank votes	280,854	5.66		
Total votes	4,965,665	100.00		
Registered voters/turnout	5,635,452	88.11		
Source: Belgian Elections
