= Paul Struye =

Belgian lawyer and politician

Minister of Justice
- In office 20 March 1947 – 27 November 1948
- Preceded by: Albert Lilar
- Succeeded by: Henri Moreau de Melen

President of the Senate
- In office 27 June 1950 – 12 March 1954
- Preceded by: Robert Gillon
- Succeeded by: Robert Gillon
- In office 24 June 1958 – 5 October 1973
- Preceded by: Robert Gillon
- Succeeded by: Pierre Harmel

Personal details
- Born: 1 July 1896 Ghent, Belgium
- Died: 16 February 1974 (aged 77) Ixelles, Belgium
- Party: Christian Social Party (PSC-CVP)

Paul Victor Antoine Struye (1 September 1896 – 16 February 1974) was a Belgian lawyer, politician, and journalist, notable for his writings during World War II. A native of Ghent, Struye served in the Belgian Army during World War I. He qualified as a lawyer in the years after the war and also worked as a journalist at the Catholic newspaper La Libre Belgique. A royalist and patriot, Struye was soon attracted to the Belgian resistance during World War II and was influential once La Libre Belgique became an underground newspaper. His diary of life under occupation and writings on public opinion are important historical sources on the period. After the war, Struye entered politics in the Christian Social Party as a senator and held the portfolio of Minister of Justice (1947-1948). He subsequently held the post of President of the Senate on two occasions.

== Biography ==
=== Early life ===
Paul Struye was born in Ghent, Belgium in 1896, the son of Dr. Eugène Struye and Jenny Linon. He was educated at Sint-Barbaracollege. During World War I, in 1915, Struye was smuggled out of German-occupied Belgium to join the Belgian army in exile, but was declared ineligible for all but ancillary military duties. Eventually he wrote to Queen Elisabeth to request a transfer to the front, where he served as a stretcher bearer. In 1918, while still at the front, he sat a philosophy degree. In November 1918, he was wounded in action.

Between the wars, Struye joined the bar in Brussels and became a lawyer at the Court of Cassation by 1940. Alongside his legal practice he also wrote for the popular conservative newspaper La Libre Belgique from 1925 where he wrote a weekly column.

=== World War II ===
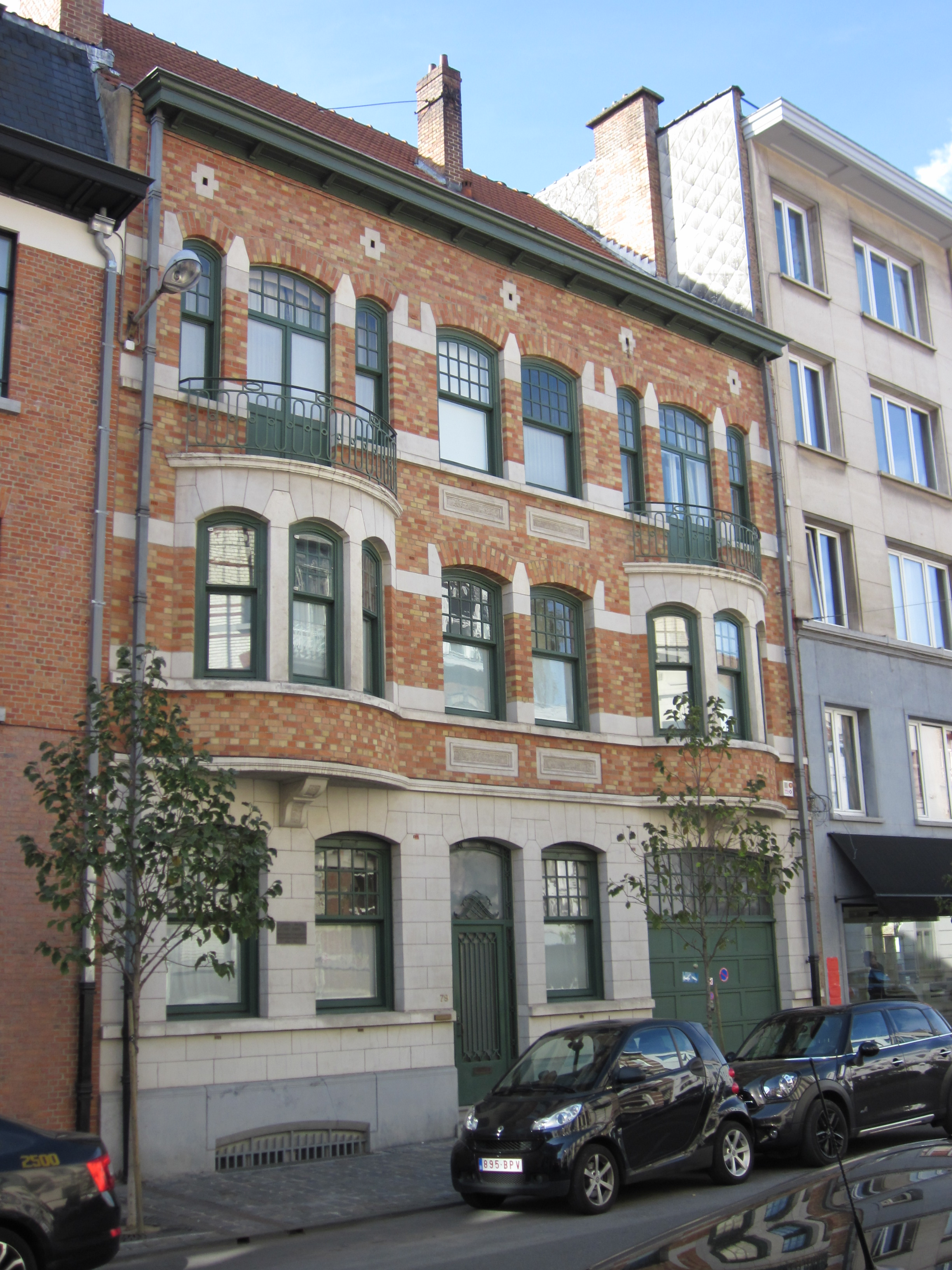
Paul Struye house on the rue Washington, Ixelles)

Under the German occupation between 1940 and 1944, Struye continued to practise as a lawyer. He began to keep a diary, recording his daily life. A royalist and Belgian patriot, he soon became involved in the Belgian Resistance, especially the La Libre Belgique of Peter Pan, an underground newspaper created in August 1940 which became one of the most prominent published during the period. Struye also keenly observed Belgian public opinion during the occupation and wrote regular reports on the subject for the Belgian government in exile.

=== Political career ===
In the first post-war elections in February 1946, Struye was elected as senator for the region of Brussels in the Christian Social Party (PSC-CVP). In March 1947, he was made Minister of Justice, responsible for the legal prosecution of former collaborators. He favoured a liberal approach towards sentencing, particularly in commuting death sentences, which was controversial. He resigned in November 1948. He took a pro-royalist stance during the Royal Question and a liberal stance in the Second Schools' War. He served two terms as President of the Senate between 1950-1954 and 1958-1973. He died in Ixelles on 16 February 1974.

== Works ==
- Une page d'histoire: la campagne des 18 jours et la reddition de l'armée belge (1940), published under the pseudonym "Saint-Yves".
- L'évolution du sentiment public en Belgique sous l'occupation allemande (1945). The work was subsequently republished in an edited volume entitled La Belgique sous l'occupation allemande, 1940-1944 (2002).
- Problèmes internationaux 1927-1972 (1972).
- Journal de guerre, 1940-1945 (2004).

Political offices
Preceded by Robert Gillon	President of the Senate; 1950–1954	Succeeded by Robert Gillon
Preceded by Robert Gillon	President of the Senate; 1958–1973	Succeeded by Pierre Harmel
