= Jean Van Houtte =

Belgian politician

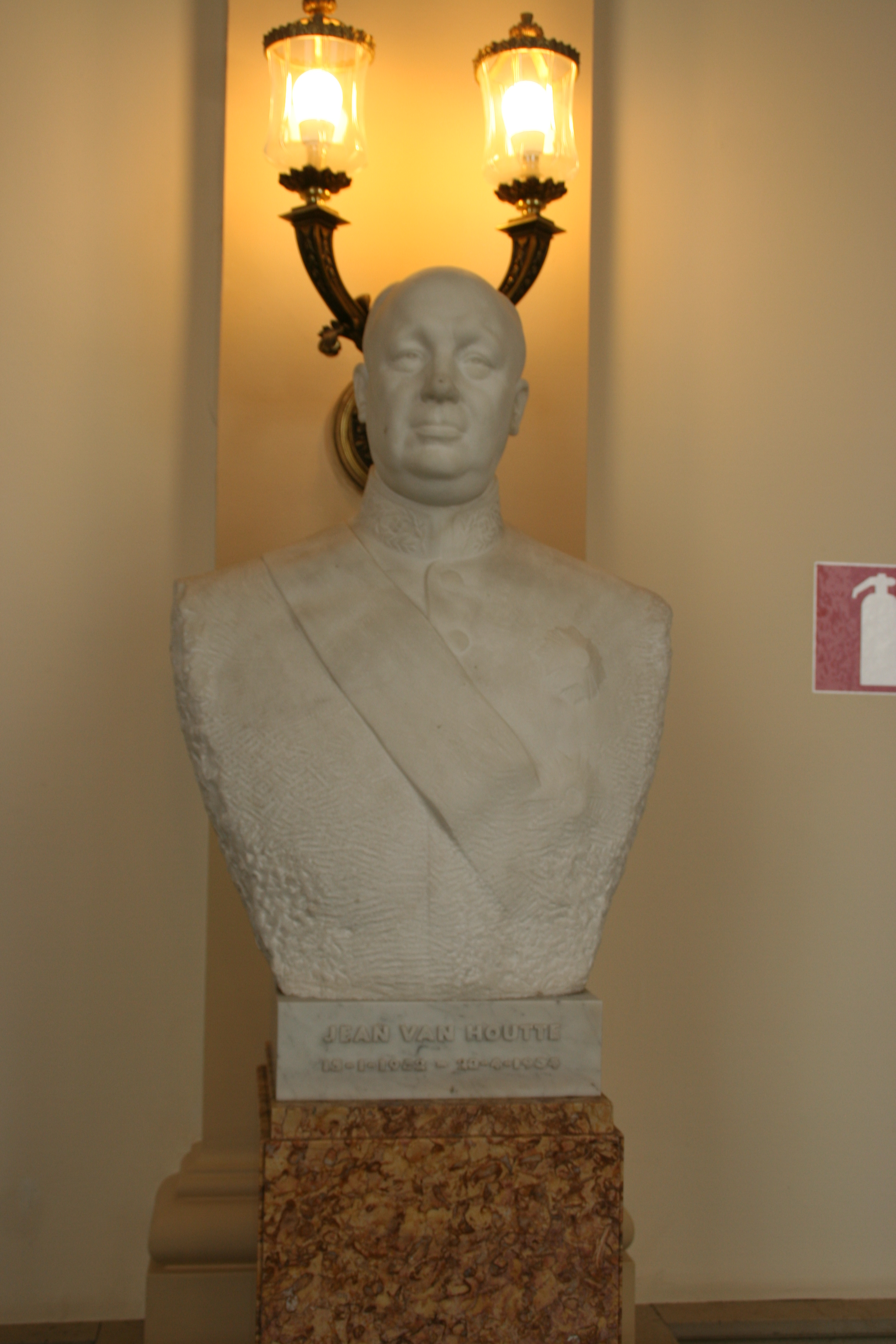
- Former Prime Minister of Belgium Jean Van Houtte's official portrait bust in the Belgian Federal Parliament

Prime Minister of Belgium
- In office 15 January 1952 – 23 April 1954
- Monarch: Baudouin
- Preceded by: Joseph Pholien
- Succeeded by: Achille Van Acker

Personal details
- Born: 17 March 1907 Ghent, Belgium
- Died: 23 May 1991 (aged 84) Brussels, Belgium
- Party: Christian Social Party
- Education: University of Liège

Jean Marie Joseph "Jan", Baron Van Houtte (17 March 1907 – 23 May 1991) was a Belgian politician who served as the Prime Minister of Belgium from 1952 to 1954.

== Biography ==
Born in Ghent, van Houtte held a doctorate in law and lectured at Ghent University and the University of Liège. He served as chairman of the Belgian Institute of Public Finance and represented the PSC-CVP in the Belgian Senate from 1949 to 1968.

Having served as Minister of Finance in the governments of Jean Duvieusart (1950) and Joseph Pholien (1950–1952), van Houtte replaced Pholien to become the 38th Prime Minister of Belgium in January 1952. His period in office was marked by disputes over conscription, and in particular the length of service of conscripts, and over the treatment of collaborators, where van Houtte controversially favoured a mild approach. An economic recession added to his troubles.

Van Houtte again served as Minister of Finance from 1958 to 1961 under Gaston Eyskens. He was governor of the World Bank, named an honorary Minister of State in 1966, and made a Baron in 1970.

== Honours ==
- Belgium: Created Baron van Houtte by Royal Decree in 1970.
- Belgium: Minister of State, by Royal Decree.
- Belgium: President of the Royal Academy.
- Belgium: Commander in the Order of Leopold.
- Belgium: knight Grand Cross in the Order of the Crown.
- Knight Grand Cross in the Order of Merit of the Federal Republic of Germany.

Political offices
Preceded by Joseph Pholien	Prime Minister of Belgium; 1952–1954	Succeeded by Achille Van Acker
