= Social Pact =

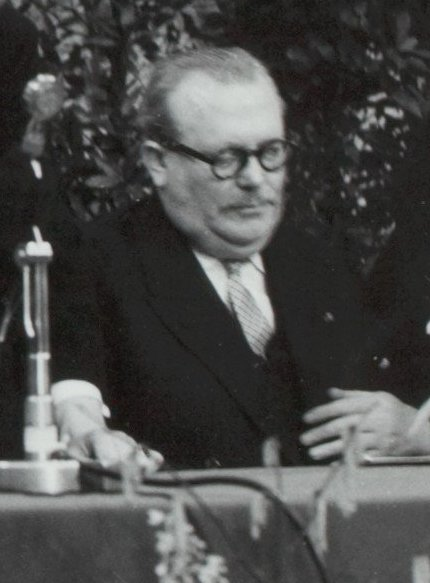
Achille Van Acker, pictured in 1958, who presided over the social security reform as prime minister in 1944

The Social Pact (French: Pacte social, Dutch: Sociaal Pact), officially entitled the Draft Accord for Social Unity (Projet d'accord de Solidarité sociale or Ontwerp van overeenkomst tot sociale solidariteit), was an informal political agreement concluded between corporate, labour, and civil service representatives in Belgium which laid the basis for a political compromise after World War II. Concluded in secret in German-occupied Belgium on 24 April 1944, the Plan was intended to lay the foundations for a new political compromise between the different groups after the war based on improved labour relations. It is most notable for laying the foundation for the country's social security legislation adopted by the government of Achille Van Acker in December 1944.

== Social Pact ==
The Social Pact brought together representatives of Belgium's pre-war trades unions and employers, as well as civil service technocrats, to agree on a number of social reforms to be implemented after the end of the war. Among the most important were the extension of state social welfare provision and collective bargaining in employment disputes. The pact was concluded in secret on 24 April 1944 while Belgium was still under German occupation as labour and company leaders prepared for the period of reconstruction which would follow liberation by the Allies. Most of Belgium was liberated in September 1944.

The agreement was conducted unofficially and independently of the Belgian government in exile and never achieved any official status, but remained an influential document on post-war politics. Many of its previsions would be met by the social reforms launched by Achille Van Acker in December 1944. The Pact has been seen as the start of the consensus politics which characterised Belgian post-war democracy, and a move towards more peaceful social relations.

According to historian Martin Conway, "the real significance of the Pact lay not in the vision it presented of a new era of social welfare but rather in the way in which its preparation demonstrated the degree of common ground that had emerged during the Occupation" between different interest groups. Other historians have pointed to the influence of pre-war corporatist ideas.

== See also ==
- Saltsjöbaden Agreement (1938) - similar agreement in Sweden
- Beveridge Report (1942) - comprehensive plan of social welfare reform in the United Kingdom
- Belgian economic miracle (1944–47)
