= Royal question =

1945–1951 Belgian political crisis

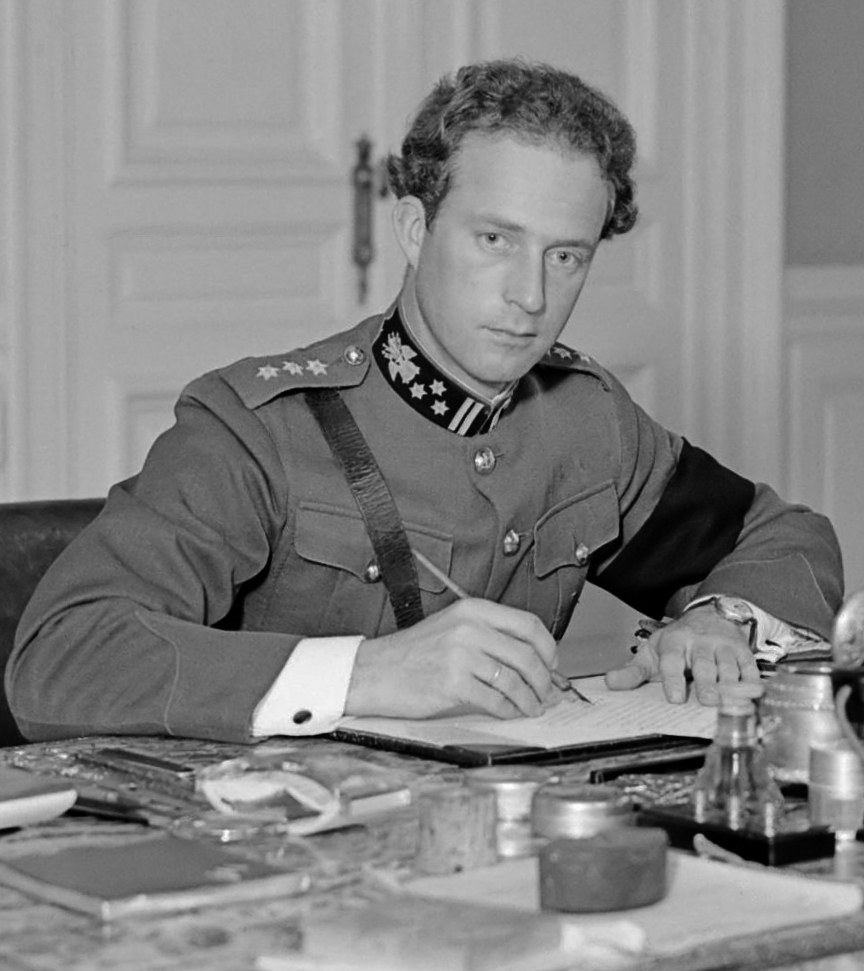
King Leopold III, the subject of the political disagreement, pictured in 1934, the year he came to the Belgian throne

The royal question (French: question royale; Dutch: Koningskwestie) was a major political crisis in Belgium that lasted from 1945 to 1951, coming to a head between March and August 1950. The question at stake surrounded whether King Leopold III could return to Belgium and resume his constitutional role amid allegations that his actions during World War II had been contrary to the provisions of the Belgian Constitution. The crisis brought Belgium to the brink of a civil war. It was eventually resolved by the abdication of Leopold in favour of his son Prince Baudouin in 1951.

The crisis emerged from the division between Leopold and his Government, led by Prime Minister Hubert Pierlot, during the German invasion in May 1940. Leopold, who was suspected of authoritarian sympathies, had assumed command of the Belgian Army at the outbreak of war. Considering his constitutional position as commander-in-chief to take precedence over his civil role as head of state, he refused to leave his defeated troops and join the Belgian government in exile in France. Leopold's refusal to obey the Government marked a constitutional crisis and he was widely condemned after negotiating his army's surrender on 28 May 1940. He spent most of the occupation under house arrest in German-occupied Belgium. Shortly before the Allies liberated the country in 1944, Leopold was deported to Germany by the Nazis.

With Belgium liberated but the King still in captivity, Leopold was declared officially "unable to rule" in accordance with the constitution and his brother, Prince Charles, Count of Flanders, was elected regent. The country was divided along political lines over whether Leopold could ever return to his functions, and with a dominantly left-wing government in Belgium, Leopold went into exile in Switzerland. In 1950, a national referendum was organised by a new centre-right government to decide on whether Leopold could return. Although the result was a victory for the Leopoldists, it produced a strong regional split between Flanders, which was broadly in favour of the King's return, and Brussels and Wallonia which generally opposed it. Leopold's return to Belgium in July 1950 was greeted with widespread protests in Wallonia and a general strike. The unrest culminated in the killing of four workers by police on 30 July. With the situation fast deteriorating, on 1 August 1950 Leopold announced his intention to abdicate. After a transition period, he formally abdicated in favour of Baudouin in July 1951.

== Background ==
=== Monarchy and the constitution ===
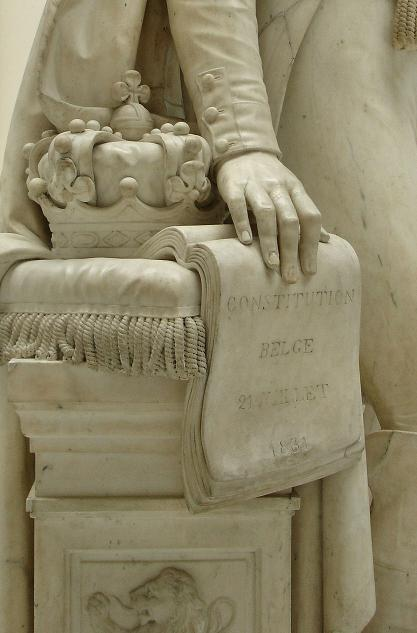
The Belgian crown symbolically resting on the constitution in a nineteenth-century statue of Leopold I

Belgium gained its independence from the United Netherlands in 1830 and was established as a popular and constitutional monarchy under a bicameral parliamentary democracy. A liberal Constitution was written in 1831 which codified the responsibilities and restrictions imposed on the monarch. As head of state, the King's acts were not valid without the countersignature and approval of a government minister. However, he was vested with full control of military matters in his capacity as Commander-in-Chief. Which responsibility would take precedence if they became incompatible was left ambiguous and this uncertainty would lie at the heart of the royal question.

The first King, Leopold I, accepted the terms of the Constitution but attempted to use its ambiguities to subtly increase his own powers. This was continued by his successors, although with little real success.

=== King Leopold III ===
King Leopold III came to the throne in 1934 after his father, Albert I, died in a mountaineering accident. Albert, known as the "Knight King" (roi-chevalier or koning-ridder), had been hugely popular in Belgium after commanding the Belgian army during World War I (1914–18) while much of the country was under German occupation. Leopold's reign was marked by economic crisis in the wake of the Great Depression, and political agitation by both far-left and far-right parties. Amid this period of crisis, Leopold attempted to expand the powers of the monarch. He was widely suspected of holding authoritarian and right-wing political views and was accordingly held in high esteem by various far-right movements in Belgium throughout his reign. These movements hoped to replace the parlementarian system by an authoritarian regime led by Leopold. From 1936, Leopold was a strong supporter of Belgium's "independence policy" of political neutrality in the face of Nazi Germany's increasingly aggressive territorial expansion.

== German invasion and occupation, 1940–44 ==
On 10 May 1940, German forces invaded neutral Belgium without a formal declaration of war. King Leopold III headed immediately to Fort Breendonk, the headquarters of the Belgian army near Mechelen, to take control of the army. He refused to address the Belgian parliament beforehand, as Albert I had famously done at the outbreak of World War I. The speed of the German advance, using the new Blitzkrieg approach, soon pushed the Belgian army westwards despite British and French support. On 16 May, the Belgian government left Brussels.

=== Break between King and Government ===
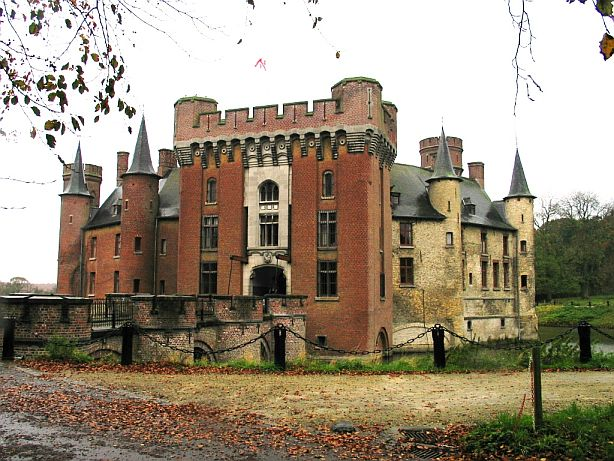
A modern view of the Kasteel van Wijnendale, where the final meeting between Leopold and the Belgian government took place on 25 May 1940

Soon after the outbreak of war, the King and Government began to disagree. While the Government argued that the German invasion had violated Belgian neutrality and made Belgium one of the Allies, Leopold argued that Belgium was still a neutral country and had no obligations beyond defending its borders. Leopold opposed allowing British and French forces into Belgian territory to fight alongside Belgian troops, as a breach of its neutrality.

On 25 May 1940, Leopold met senior representatives of his Government for a final time at the Kasteel van Wijnendale in West Flanders. The meeting is frequently cited as the start of the royal question and the moment of the decisive break between King and Government. Four ministers were present: Hubert Pierlot, Paul-Henri Spaak, Henri Denis and Arthur Vanderpoorten. By the time of the meeting, against the backdrop of the bloody Battle of the Lys, the Belgian government was preparing to continue the fight against Germany from exile in France. They urged the King to join them, following the examples of Queen Wilhelmina of the Netherlands and Charlotte, Grand Duchess of Luxembourg. The King rejected their arguments and hardened his own position. He refused to leave Belgian territory and his army in Flanders at any cost. The ministers suspected that Leopold's aides were already negotiating with the Germans. The meeting broke up with no agreement and the Belgian Government left for France.

King Leopold negotiated a cease-fire with the Germans on 27 May 1940, and the Belgian armed forces officially surrendered the following day. Leopold became a prisoner of war and was placed under house arrest at the Royal Palace of Laeken, near Brussels. Furious that the King had both ignored the Government and negotiated a surrender without consulting them, Pierlot gave an angry speech on Radio Paris, condemning the King and announcing the Government's intention to continue fighting alongside the Allies. French politicians, notably Paul Reynaud, blamed Leopold for the growing disaster of the Battle of France and angrily condemned him as a "criminal king" (roi-félon).

=== King Leopold during the German occupation ===
"Military honour, the dignity of the Crown and the good of the country forbade me from following the government out of Belgium."

— Political Testament of Leopold III, 1944

With the Belgian surrender on 28 May 1940, Belgium was placed under German occupation and a military administration was established under General Alexander von Falkenhausen to govern the country. Belgian civil servants were ordered to remain at their posts in order to ensure the continued functioning of the state and to attempt to protect the population from the demands of the German authorities.

With France's defeat and the installation of the pro-German Vichy regime, it was widely believed that Germany was about to win the war. King Leopold was hailed as a "martyr" or a symbol of national resilience, in contrast to a Government that appeared to place its ideology above the interests of the Belgian people. On 31 May 1940, the senior representative of the Catholic Church in Belgium, Jozef-Ernest Cardinal van Roey, circulated a pastoral letter calling for all Belgians to unite around the King. Other figures in the King's entourage, particularly the authoritarian socialist Henri de Man, believed that democracy had failed and that the end of the war would see the King as the ruler of an authoritarian Belgian state.

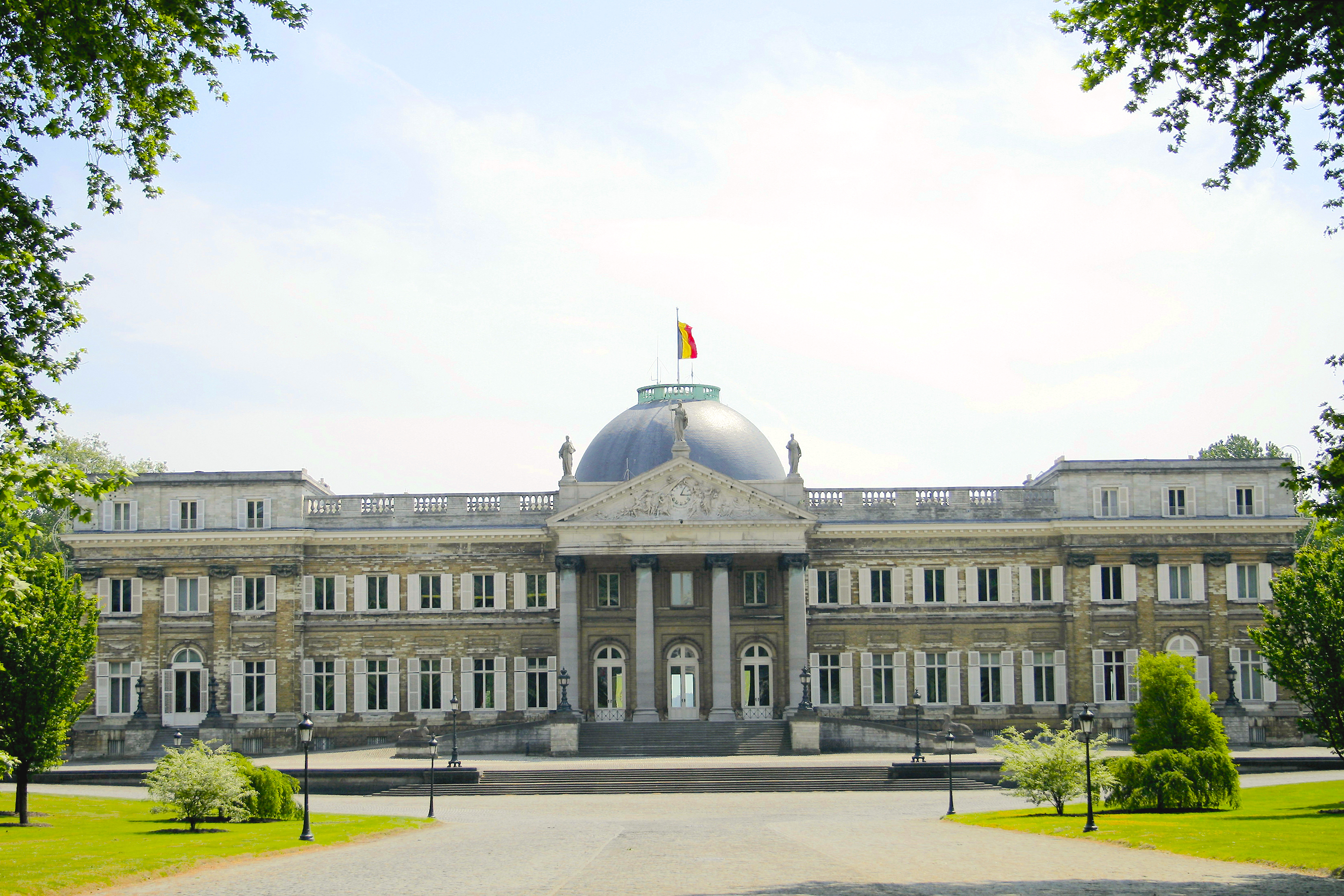
Modern view of the Royal Palace of Laeken, where Leopold was detained during the occupation

Imprisoned, the King continued to follow his own political programme. He believed that after the German victory, a "New Order" would be established in Europe and that, as the senior Belgian figure in occupied Europe, he could negotiate with the German authorities. King Leopold corresponded with Adolf Hitler and tried to organise a meeting with him. Hitler remained uninterested and distrustful of the King, but on 19 November 1940, King Leopold succeeded in gaining an unproductive audience with him at Berchtesgaden.

Popular support for Leopold in Belgium declined sharply in December 1941 when news of Leopold's remarriage to Lilian Baels was made public. The marriage was deeply unpopular with the Belgian public. (Note: Leopold's first wife, Astrid, had been killed in a car accident in 1935 and remained hugely popular with the public. By contrast, Baels, who had no noble title and came from Flanders, was considered nouveau riche and her political influence over the king was distrusted.) The image of the "prisoner-king" (roi prisonnier), sharing the suffering of the Belgian prisoners of war, was undermined and his popularity fell sharply, especially in Wallonia, the home of the majority of the Belgian prisoners still detained. Popular opinion also turned on the king for his perceived unwillingness to speak out against German occupation policies.

Amid German defeats against the Russians on the Eastern Front after 1942, the King prepared for the end of the war. He ordered the preparation of a document, known as the Political Testament (Testament Politique), which would justify his behaviour under the occupation and detail his interventions on behalf of Belgian prisoners of war and deported workers. Leopold, however, continued to condemn the action of the Belgian government in exile (based in London after October 1940). On 7 June 1944, following D-Day, he was deported to Germany. He was finally liberated by American forces on 7 May 1945.

== Regency and the early crisis, 1944–49 ==
=== Leopold declared "unable to reign", 1944 ===
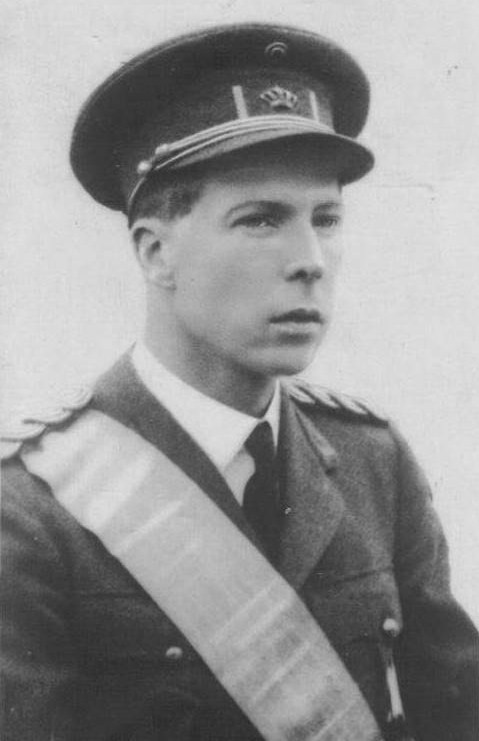
Prince Charles, Count of Flanders, who was installed as regent in 1944

After the Allied landings in Normandy, Allied troops advanced eastwards and crossed the Belgian frontier on 1 September 1944. German forces offered little resistance and, by 4 September, the Allies were in control of Brussels, although the last occupied parts of Belgian territory were only liberated in February 1945. On 8 September 1944, the government in exile returned to Brussels and was greeted with general indifference. Although the King was no longer in the country, his Political Testament was presented to the returned Government as he had wished and was soon circulated publicly. At the same time, a copy was presented to the British King, George VI, and was seen by the Foreign Secretary Anthony Eden. The text reignited the divisions within the Government which had been largely hidden since earlier in the war.

Since the King was still in German custody, there was no opposition to the creation of a regency in his absence. On 20 September 1944, a meeting of both chambers of Parliament was called. Article 82 of the Constitution (Note: Subsequent constitutional revisions have shifted the "inability to reign" clause, formerly Article 82, to its current position as Article 93 of the Constitution. The clause itself remains unchanged and was again enforced for a 24-hour period in 1990 to allow a law legalising abortion to pass without the signature of King Baudouin.) was invoked, declaring the King "unable to reign" (dans l'impossibilité de régner). Leopold's reclusive brother, Prince Charles, Count of Flanders, was elected regent and took the oath the following day. Further action on the royal question was pushed aside by more pressing economic and political issues that occupied most of the Government's time. With Belgium under partial Allied military administration until the restoration of the government services, British hostility to Leopold's return also complicated the issue.

=== Political recovery and revival of the royal question ===
Soon after the liberation, Belgium began a period of rapid economic recovery and the process of political reconstruction began. The traditional party system had been torn apart by the war and occupation. The two major ideological blocks proceeded to create their own parties: socialists created the Belgian Socialist Party (PSB–BSP), while Catholics and conservatives created the Christian Social Party (PSC–CVP). The biggest change in early post-liberation politics was the surge of support for the Communist Party of Belgium, which became the third party in Belgian politics until 1949, temporarily displacing the Liberal Party. The Walloon Movement also re-emerged after the war, promoting the culture and economic interests of the French-speaking areas in the south. The period saw major reform of trade unions following the creation of the first large unified union, the General Labour Federation of Belgium (Fédération générale du Travail de Belgique or Algemeen Belgisch Vakverbond, FGTB–ABVV), in April 1945 with 248,000 members nationwide. By 1947, however, the political structure of the Belgian state had stabilised.

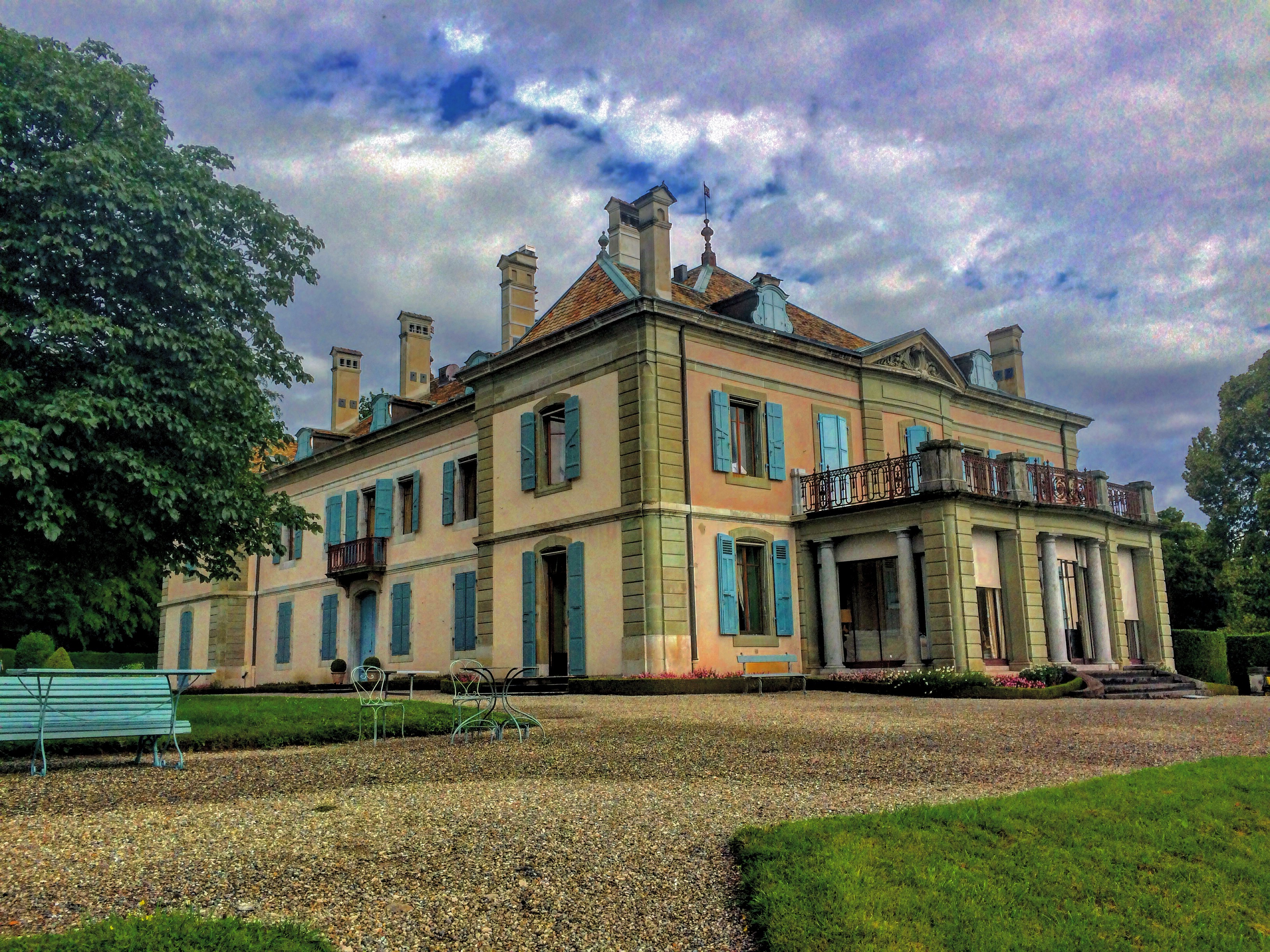
The Villa le Reposoir in Pregny, Switzerland where King Leopold III spent the years from 1945 to 1950 in exile

Under the early regency, both the Pierlot and subsequent Achille Van Acker governments attempted to avoid confronting the issue of Leopold's return despite calls from communists, some socialists and trade unionists for the King's abdication in April and May 1945. Soon after the King's liberation, Van Acker and a government delegation headed to Strobl, Austria to negotiate with Leopold. At a series of meetings between 9 and 11 May 1945, Van Acker insisted that the King publicly announce his support for the Allied cause and his commitment to parliamentary democracy. No agreement was reached. In the meantime, Leopold took up residence in Pregny (near Geneva) in Switzerland under the pretext that heart palpitations made further negotiations or thoughts of a return to political life impossible.

In Belgium, political debate about the royal question continued and grew after the war, and remained a polemical topic in the popular press, notably in the Francophone newspaper Le Soir. In the general election of 1949, (Note: The 1949 general election was the first vote held in Belgium under truly universal suffrage following the extension of the vote to all Belgian women in March 1948.) the PSC–CVP campaigned on a pro-Leopold royalist platform. The results reshaped the political landscape; the communists were routed (Note: The Communist Party of Belgium saw its share of the vote fall from 12.68 per cent to just 7.48 in the 1949 elections. By 1954, it was gaining just 3.57 per cent of the vote and never recovered its earlier influence.) and the PSB–BSP lost seats to both the Liberals and Catholics. The Catholics gained a new majority in the Senate and a plurality in the Chamber of Representatives, their best results since the war. Gaston Eyskens took over as prime minister at the head of a Liberal-Catholic coalition. Both parties in the government (and Leopold himself) supported a referendum on the King's return, which became the focus of political attention.

== Culmination of the crisis, 1950 ==
=== Referendum of March 1950 ===
The Eyskens government agreed to a national referendum, known as the "popular consultation" (consultation populaire or volksraadpleging), which was scheduled for 12 March 1950. It was the first-ever referendum in Belgian history and was intended to be advisory. Campaigning was vigorous on both sides, with little disruption at the polls, despite the contentious nature of the subject.

Result of the referendum was that Leopold's return won a 58 per cent majority in the national vote, with majorities in seven of the nine provinces. However, the vote was heavily divided by region. In Flanders, 72 per cent voted in favour of Leopold's return, but in the arrondissement of Brussels, the Leopoldists won only a minority of 48 per cent. In Wallonia, a mere 42 per cent voted for the restitution of the King. The final results, in percentages by province, were (with green standing for the Leopoldist side and red for the anti-Leopoldist one):

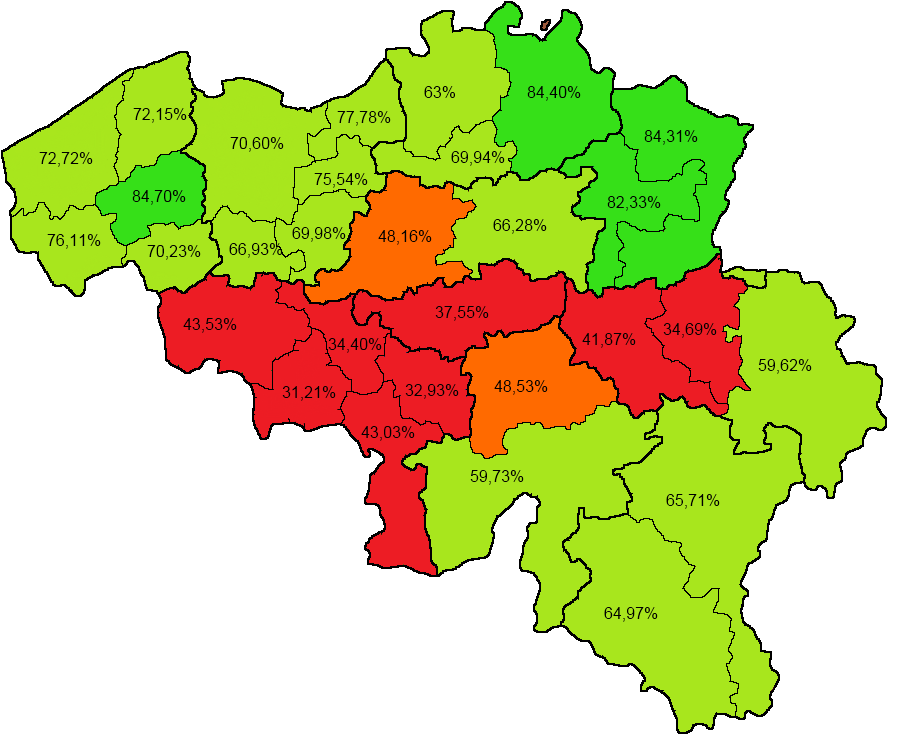
Koningskwestie kaart met percentage voor-stemmen

*The majority in the arrondissement of Verviers voted in favour of the King's return. **The arrondissement of Namur voted against the return.

The result confirmed the worries of some, including Spaak, that the vote would not be sufficiently decisive in either direction and could divide the country along regional and linguistic lines. On 13 March, Eyskens travelled to Pregny to encourage Leopold to abdicate. Paul Van Zeeland and Spaak attempted to broker a new agreement by which Leopold would abdicate in favour of his son. On 15 April 1950, Leopold announced that he was willing to temporarily delegate his authority. Many within the PSC–CVP realised that, despite the referendum's result, their party's lack of a parliamentary majority would undermine their ability to build a national reconciliation around the King as long as their Liberal coalition partners and socialist opponents were unwilling to accept the King's return.

=== King Leopold's return to Belgium ===
On 29 April 1950, Prince-Regent Charles dissolved parliament pending fresh elections. His intention was probably to prevent the formation of a PSC–CVP government under Van Zeeland, a staunch Leopoldist, which would lead to the return of the King without further discussion. The following election produced an absolute PSC–CVP majority in both Chamber and Senate, (Note: The PSC–CVP bicameral majority produced by the election of 1950 was the last to be gained by any single party in Belgian political history.) and a new single-party government under Jean Duvieusart was formed.

One of the first acts of the Duvieusart government was to introduce a bill bringing the "impossibility to reign" to an end. On 22 July 1950, Leopold returned to Belgium for the first time since June 1944 and resumed his functions.

=== General strike and abdication ===
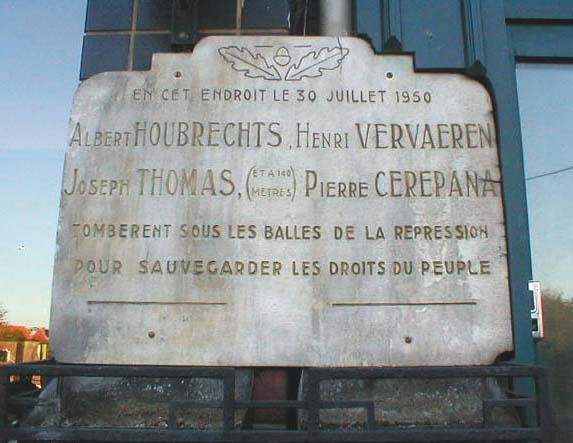
Memorial plaque at Grâce-Berleur, near Liège, commemorating the four workers shot dead by Belgian police on 30 July 1950

In 1949, the FGTB–ABVV voted a special budget of ten million Belgian francs to establish a Committee of Common Action (Comité d'action commune) aimed at supporting strike action taken in the event of the King's return. The union took the lead in the opposition which emerged in the summer of 1950. André Renard, a Walloon trade union leader, called for "insurrection" and "revolution" in the newspaper La Wallonie shortly after the King's return in July 1950. Modern historians have noted that "the smell of revolution was on the air" as Walloon nationalists called for the immediate secession of Wallonia and the creation of a republic.

The general strike of 1950 began in the coal mining centres of Hainaut and quickly spread. Workers were soon on strike across Wallonia, Brussels, and, to a lesser extent, Flanders. The port of Antwerp was one of the key sites affected and the country was virtually paralysed. On 30 July, four workers were shot dead by the Gendarmerie at Grâce-Berleur, near Liège and the violence intensified. Staunch Leopoldists in the Government called for a stronger stance but found themselves in a minority, even in the PSC–CVP. Frustrated at the lack of progress, the Government threatened to resign en masse.

As the situation escalated, the National Confederation of Political Prisoners and their Dependents (Confédération nationale des prisonniers politiques et des ayants droit, Nationale Confederatie van Politieke Gevangenen en Rechthebbenden, or CNPPA–NCPGR), the organisation representing political prisoners detained during the German occupation, offered to act as intermediaries between the different parties because of their respected status. The CNPPA–NCPGR succeeded in persuading both the King and the Government to reopen negotiations which resumed on 31 July. In the afternoon of 1 August, Leopold publicly announced his intention to abdicate in favour of his eldest son, Baudouin, to avoid further bloodshed. Baudouin, at the age of 19, became regent, with the title of "prince royal" on 11 August 1950.

== Accession of King Baudouin, 1951 ==
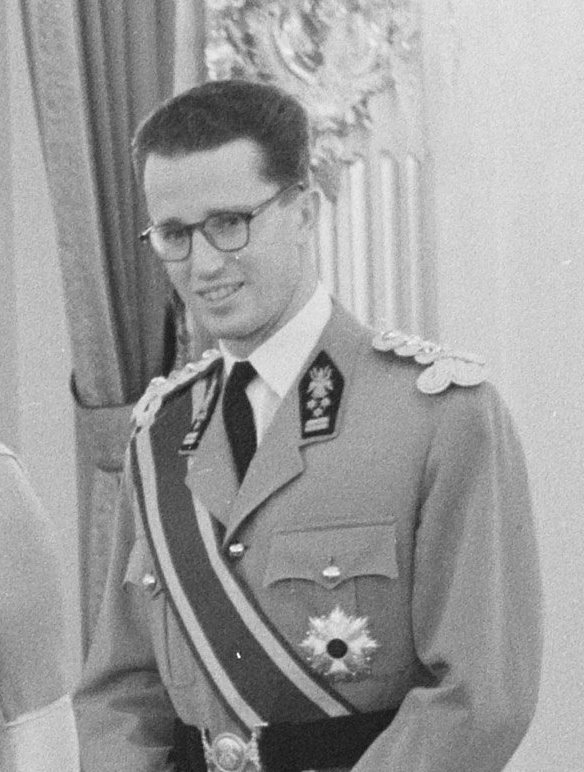
King Baudouin, photographed in 1960, who succeeded Leopold in 1951

King Leopold's abdication message of 1 August 1950 was premised on a reconciliation in the person of his eldest son over the course of a year. Baudouin was seen by most parties as an acceptable alternative candidate. Under a law of 11 August, executive powers were transferred to Baudouin in advance of the official abdication. Leopold formally abdicated on 16 July 1951. His son succeeded him the following day as King Baudouin.

=== Assassination of Julien Lahaut ===
On 11 August 1950, as Crown Prince Baudouin was taking the oath of allegiance (as regent) to the Constitution in front of the Parliament, an unidentified individual in the Communist benches shouted "Vive la république!" ("Long Live the Republic!"). The interruption caused outrage. It was widely suspected that the culprit was Julien Lahaut, the noted Communist leader who had been one of the leading opponents of Leopold's return. A week later (18 August), Lahaut was shot dead by an unidentified assassin outside his house in Seraing, near Liège. The murder shocked the Belgian public and an estimated 200,000 people attended Lahaut's funeral. Although no-one was ever prosecuted for the murder, it was widely attributed to clandestine Leopoldist militia like the Ligue Eltrois or the Bloc anticommuniste belge who operated with the knowledge of the security services. In 2015, new research by a team of historians linked the assassination of Lahaut to anti-communist and royalist elements inside the Belgian intelligence services, probably spearheaded by André Moyen.

== Aftermath and significance ==
In the aftermath of the royal question, national priorities shifted to other political questions. On 17 September 1950, the government of Joseph Pholien announced its intention of dispatching Belgian volunteers to fight in the Korean War. Negotiations about the European Defence Community followed and, by the mid-1950s, Belgium was immersed in a new political crisis, known as the Second School War, surrounding the secularisation of education. In August 1960, King Baudouin informed Prime Minister Gaston Eyskens that he did not have confidence in his government and asked for his resignation. Eyskens refused and challenged the King to invoke Article 65 of the Constitution and unilaterally revoke his ministerial mandate. Fearing that such an action would reopen the royal question, King Baudouin yielded.

Modern historians describe the royal question as an important moment in Belgian recovery after World War II. The opposition between Leopoldists and anti-Leopoldists led to the re-establishment of socialist and Catholic political parties from before the war. The question was also an important moment in the Belgian linguistic conflict. It also put an end to the federalisation of Belgian institutions which might exacerbate the regional tensions exposed by the royal question. In addition, the perceived failure of the PSC–CVP to realise Flemish demands for the return of Leopold helped to strengthen support for the Flemish nationalist Volksunie party after 1954. In Wallonia, the legacy of trade union and socialist political mobilisation during the general strike paved the way for a left-wing revival of the Walloon Movement, eventually witnessed in the Belgian general strike of 1960–1961.

The Lahaut assassination was not solved, and it remained contentious as the only political murder in Belgian history until the death of the socialist politician André Cools in 1991. Leopoldists were suspected, but no individual was prosecuted in the aftermath. An inquiry by historians Rudy Van Doorslaer and Etienne Verhoeyen named an alleged culprit. A final report, commissioned by the Belgian government, was submitted in 2015.

== Notes and references ==
=== Bibliography ===
- Conway, Martin (2012). The Sorrows of Belgium: Liberation and Political Reconstruction, 1944–1947. Oxford: Oxford University Press. ISBN 978-0-19-969434-1.
- Crossland, John (4 January 1996). "Allies' dilemma over 'cowardice' of Belgian king". The Independent.
- Dumoulin, Michel; Van den Wijngaert, Mark; Dujardin, Vincent (2001). Léopold III. Brussels: Complexe. ISBN 2-87027-878-0.
- Gérard-Libois, Jules; Lewin, Rosine (1992). La Belgique entre dans la guerre froide et l'Europe: 1947–1953. Brussels: Pol-His. ISBN 978-2-87311-008-6.
- Havaux, Pierre (29 March 2013). "Léopold III, l'impossible réhabilitation". Le Vif. Archived from the original on 3 February 2014.
- Mabille, Xavier (2003). La Belgique depuis la Seconde guerre mondiale. Brussels: Crisp. ISBN 2-87075-084-6.
- Van den Wijngaert, Mark; Dujardin, Vincent (2006). "La Belgique sans Roi, 1940–1950". Nouvelle histoire de Belgique. Brussels: Éd. Complexe. ISBN 2-8048-0078-4.
- Witte, Els; Craeybeckx, Jan; Meynen, Alain (2009). Political History of Belgium from 1830 Onwards (New ed.). Brussels: ASP. ISBN 978-90-5487-517-8.
- Vlassenbroeck, Julien (12 May 2015). "Julien Lahaut assassiné par un réseau soutenu par l'establishment belge". RTBF.
- Young, Crawford (1965). Politics in the Congo: Decolonization and Independence. Princeton: Princeton University Press. OCLC 307971.
