= 1958 Belgian general election =

- 1 June 1958

212 seats in the Chamber of Representatives
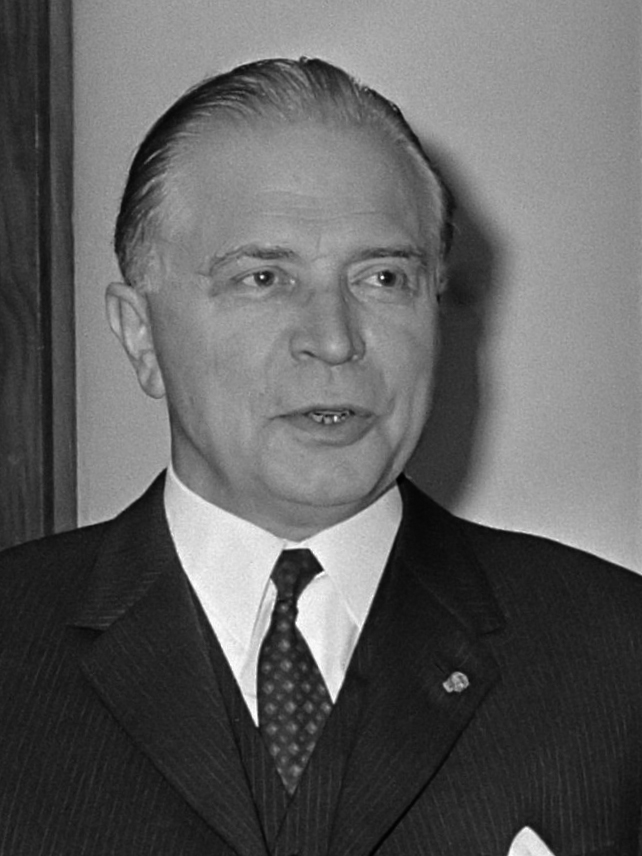

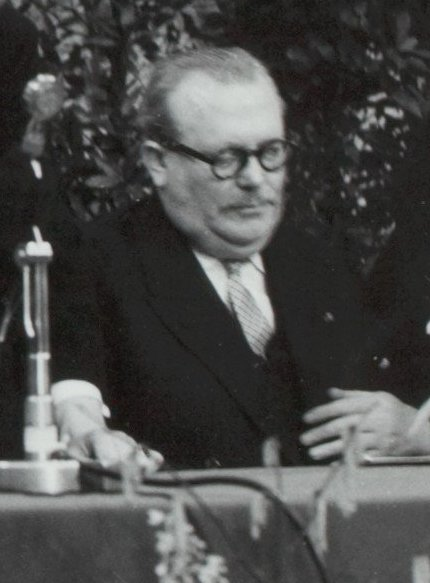

	First party	Second party	Third party
Leader	Gaston Eyskens	Achille Van Acker	Maurice Destenay
Party	Christian Social	Socialist	Liberal
Leader since	Candidate for PM	Candidate for PM	1954
Last election	95 seats, 41.15%	82 seats, 37.34%	24 seats, 12.15%
Seats won	104	80	20
Seat change	▲9	▼2	▼4
Popular vote	2,465,549	1,897,646	585,999
Percentage	46.50%	35.79%	11.05%
Swing	▲5.35%	▼1.55%	▼1.10%
	Fourth party	Fifth party	Sixth party
Leader	N/A	Ernest Burnelle	Frans Van der Elst
Party	LSK	Communist	VU
Leader since	N/A	1954	1955
Last election	5 seats, 2.10%	4 seats, 3.57%	New
Seats won	5	2	1
Seat change	Steady	▼2	New
Popular vote	111,284	100,145	104,823
Percentage	2.10%	1.89%	1.98%
Swing	Steady	▼1.68%	New
- Chamber seat distribution by constituency
Government before election
van Acker IV
BSP/PSB-Lib
Government after election
G. Eyskens II
Christian Social

General elections were held in Belgium on 1 June 1958. The result was a victory for the Christian Social Party, which won 104 of the 212 seats in the Chamber of Representatives and 53 of the 106 seats in the Senate. Voter turnout was 93.6% in the Chamber election and 93.7% in the Senate election. Elections for the nine provincial councils were also held.

The election took place in a political crisis known as the Second School War. The outgoing anti-clerical "purple" government of the Socialist and Liberal Party, led by Achille Van Acker, reversed policies of the previous Catholic-led government regarding private schools. The Van Acker government lost the election, leading again to a Catholic government led by Gaston Eyskens. That government, which was a few seats short of a majority in the Chamber, would be the last single-party government in Belgian history. Later in 1958, the School War was ended by a cross-party agreement and the Liberal Party joined the government.

== Results ==
=== Chamber of Deputies ===
Party	Votes	%	Seats	+/–
Christian Social Party	2,465,549	46.50	104	+9
Belgian Socialist Party	1,897,646	35.79	80	–2
Liberal Party	585,999	11.05	20	–4
Liberal–Socialist Kartels	111,284	2.10	5	0
People's Union	104,823	1.98	1	New
Communist Party of Belgium	100,145	1.89	2	–2
Other parties	36,907	0.70	0	–
Total	5,302,353	100.00	212	0
Valid votes	5,302,353	95.11		
Invalid/blank votes	272,774	4.89		
Total votes	5,575,127	100.00		
Registered voters/turnout	5,954,858	93.62		
Source: Nohlen & Stöver

=== Senate ===
Party	Votes	%	Seats	+/–
Christian Social Party	2,478,153	47.12	53	+4
Belgian Socialist Party	1,886,242	35.87	40	–2
Liberal Party	574,230	10.92	10	–1
Liberal–Socialist Kartels	111,299	2.12	2	0
Communist Party of Belgium	100,788	1.92	1	–1
People's Union	84,364	1.60	0	0
Democratic Party	23,953	0.46	0	–
Independents	23,953	0.46	0	–
Total	5,259,029	100.00	106	0
Valid votes	5,259,029	94.26		
Invalid/blank votes	320,096	5.74		
Total votes	5,579,125	100.00		
Registered voters/turnout	5,954,858	93.69		
Source: Nohlen & Stöver, Belgian Elections
