= Théo Lefèvre =

Belgian politician (1914–1973)

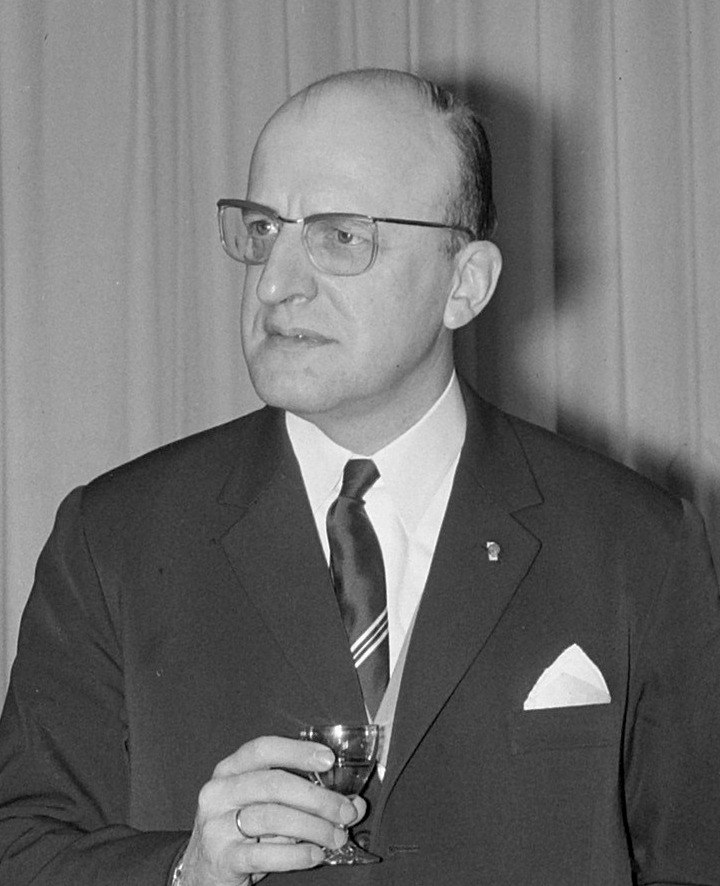
- Lefèvre in 1964

Prime Minister of Belgium
- In office 25 April 1961 – 28 July 1965
- Monarch: Baudouin
- Preceded by: Gaston Eyskens
- Succeeded by: Pierre Harmel

Personal details
- Born: 17 January 1914 Ghent, Belgium
- Died: 18 September 1973 (aged 59) Woluwe-Saint-Lambert, Belgium
- Party: Christian Social Party

Théodore Joseph Albéric Marie Lefèvre (French pronunciation: [teɔdɔʁ ʒozɛf albeʁik maʁi teo ləfɛvʁ]; 17 January 1914 – 18 September 1973), better known as Théo Lefèvre, was a Belgian politician and lawyer who served as the prime minister of Belgium from 1961 to 1965. He was a lawyer at the Ghent court of justice, and became deputy of the Belgian parliament for the PSC-CVP in 1946.

== Political career ==
Théo Lefèvre was elected to the Chamber of Representatives in 1946 and served until 1971, when he became a member of the Belgian Senate (1971–1973).

In September 1950 Lefèvre became Chairman of the PSC-CVP (1950–1961). In December 1958 he was appointed a Minister of State.

In 1961, after the fall of the fourth government of Gaston Eyskens and the following snap election, Lefèvre became Prime Minister of a centre-left cabinet. During this period, the Belgian army intervened in Congo (Operation Dragon Rouge). His government encountered heavy opposition, and the planned health care reform only succeeded due to large concessions made by the government. Having become unpopular, Lefèvre lost the elections of 1965 and was excluded from the next government, which was a coalition government of Christian-democrats and liberals.

In 1968 Lefèvre was again included in the government led by Gaston Eyskens (Eyskens V) as a minister without portfolio, charged with scientific policy (1968–1972). In 1972 (Eyskens VI) he became state secretary for scientific policy (January 1972 - January 1973).

== Personal life ==
On 26 August 1944, Theo Lefèvre married Marie-José Billiaert (1918–1998). They had three children. He died of cancer in September 1973.

== Honours ==
- Minister of State, by royal Decree.
- Commander in the Order of Leopold.
- Knight Grand Cross in the Order of the Crown.
- Knight Grand Cross in the Order of Merit of the Federal Republic of Germany.

Political offices
Preceded by Gaston Eyskens	Prime Minister of Belgium; 1961–1965	Succeeded by Pierre Harmel
