= Pierre Harmel =

Belgian politician (1911–2009)

The Count Harmel
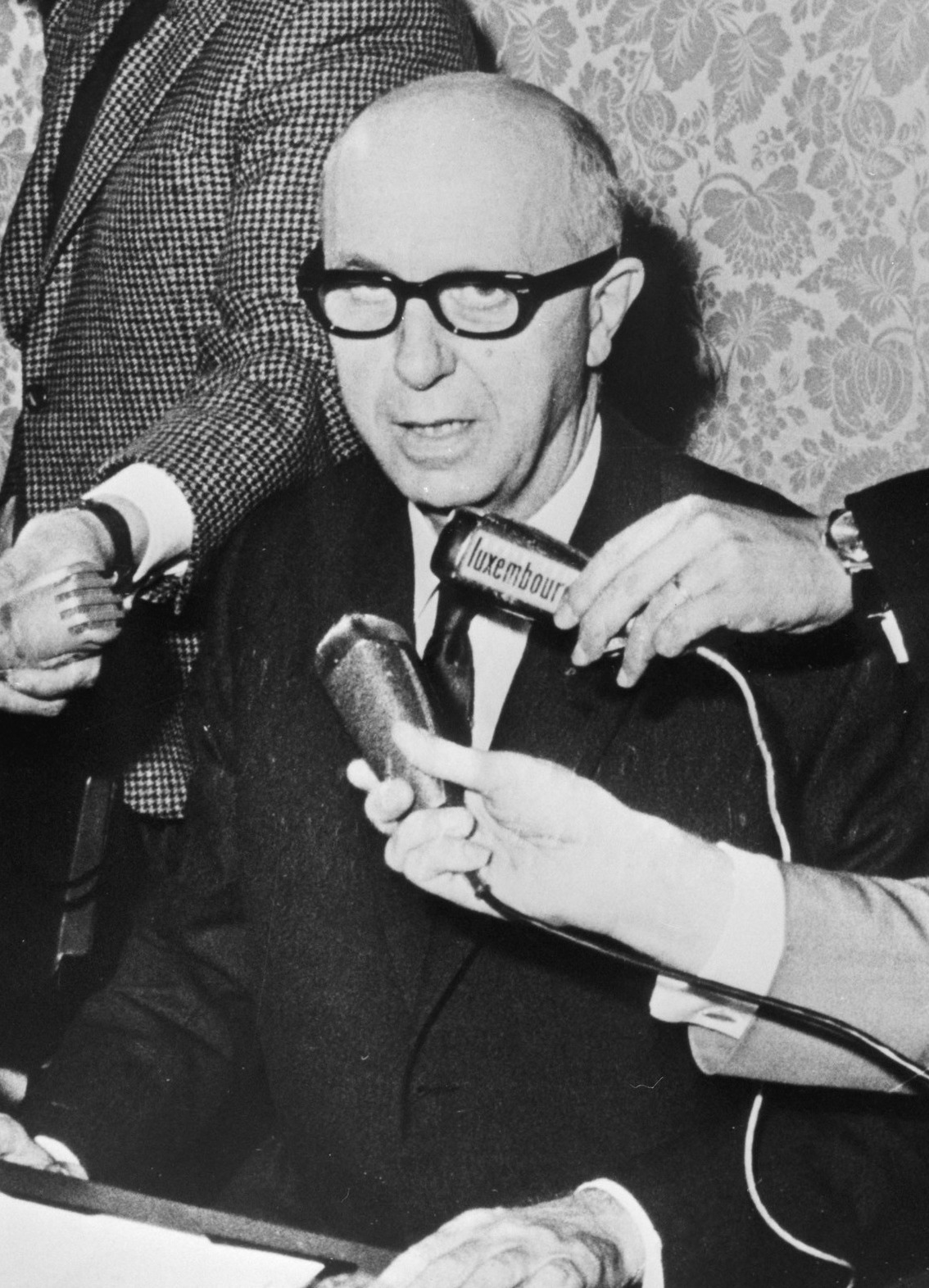
- Harmel in 1965

Prime Minister of Belgium
- In office 28 July 1965 – 19 March 1966
- Monarch: Baudouin
- Preceded by: Théo Lefèvre
- Succeeded by: Paul Vanden Boeynants

President of the Senate
- In office 9 October 1973 – 7 June 1977
- Preceded by: Paul Struye
- Succeeded by: Robert Vandekerckhove

Personal details
- Born: 16 March 1911 Uccle, Belgium
- Died: 15 November 2009 (aged 98) Brussels, Belgium
- Party: Christian Social Party; Humanist Democratic Centre
- Education: University of Liège
- Profession: Lawyer

Pierre Charles José Marie, Count Harmel (French pronunciation: [pjɛʁ aʁmɛl]; 16 March 1911 – 15 November 2009) was a Belgian lawyer, Christian Democratic politician and diplomat. Harmel served as the prime minister of Belgium from 1965 to 1966, leading a centre-left cabinet.

== Early life ==
He was born in Uccle, son of father Charles Harmel and mother Eusibie André. He studied law at the University of Liège (Liège), where he obtained the titles of Doctor of Laws and Master of Social Science in 1933. During his studies, he was active in the Association catholique belge, of which he became the chairman in 1938.

Mobilized in 1940, he took part in the 18 days Campaign. In 1947, he was appointed professor of law at the University of Liège.

== Political career ==
=== Early political career ===
Member of the PSC-CVP since its creation in 1945, Harmel was elected deputy for the first time in the parliamentary elections of 17 February 1946. He would keep his seat without interruption until 1971.

Harmel represented Belgium at the fourth session of the General Assembly of the United Nations in 1949. He subsequently was member of several governments in the 1950s and 1960s.

=== School War ===
During his period as Minister of Education (8 June 1950 until 22 April 1954), Harmel increased the wages of teachers in private (i.e. Catholic) schools and introduced laws linking the subsidies for private schools to the number of pupils. These measures were perceived by the secularists (i.e. the anti-clerical Liberals and Socialists) as a declaration of war. When the 1954 elections brought to power a coalition of Socialists and Liberals, the new Education Minister, Leo Collard, immediately set out to reverse the measures taken by his predecessor, sparking mass protests by the Catholic bloc. A compromise was eventually found by the next government (a Catholic minority government led by Gaston Eyskens), and the "School War" was concluded by 6 November 1958 School Pact. André Molitor was one of the chief architects of the school pact.

=== Minister of Justice, Prime Minister and Minister of Foreign Affairs ===
Harmel was Minister of Justice in the second government led by Gaston Eyskens (23 June 1958 – 6 November 1958), and then Minister of Culture (6 November 1958 – 3 September 1960) and Minister of the Civil Service (3 September 1960 – 25 April 1961) in the third Eyskens cabinet.

Prime Minister of Belgium from 28 July 1965 until 19 March 1966, Harmel led a coalition comprising Christian Democrats and Socialists. Finally, he was Minister of Foreign Affairs in the Liberal-Christian Democratic coalition led by Paul Vanden Boeynants (19 March 1966 – 7 February 1968). As Foreign Minister he chaired the opening meeting of the enlargement negotiations between the EEC and the four applicants for Community membership in June 1970. Indeed, Harmel's opening statement to the enlargement conference has since formed the basis of the Community opening position for future enlargement discussions.

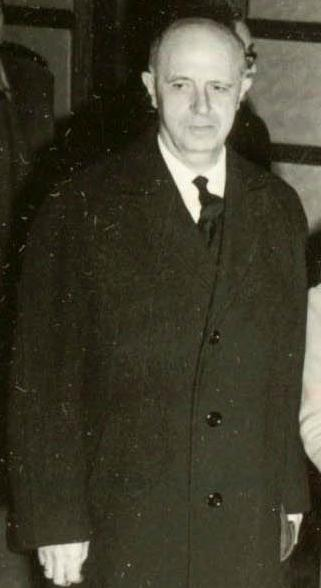
Pierre Harmel in 1967

==== Harmel Doctrine ====
As Minister of Foreign Affairs, he submitted a report titled "Future Tasks of the Alliance" to the NATO council of ministers. This Harmel report, which was approved by the council in December 1967, contained the so-called "Harmel Doctrine". It advocated a strong defence combined with good diplomatic relations with the countries of the Warsaw Pact. The Harmel Doctrine helped to pave the way for the east–west détente of the early 1970s, which led to the 1975 Helsinki Summit and the creation of the OSCE. Harmel himself visited several Warsaw Pact countries.

=== Later career ===
After 25 years in the Chamber of Deputies, Harmel was Senator from 1971 until 1977. He was made a Minister of State from 1973. In 1988, he was awarded an honorary doctorate at the Catholic University of Louvain, and in 1991, was raised into the Belgian nobility by King Baudouin with the hereditary title of Count Harmel (Dutch: graaf Harmel).

== Personal life ==
Harmel was married to Marie-Claire Van Gehuchten from 22 May 1946. Together they had 6 children, four sons and two daughters. Harmel died on 15 November 2009 at the age of 98. His wife died in 2018.

== Honours ==
- Belgium: Croix de Guerre.
- Belgium: Minister of state, by Royal Decree.
- Belgium: Member of the Royal Academy.
- Belgium: Grand Cordon in the Order of Leopold.
- Belgium: Grand Officer in the Order of Leopold II.
- Knight Grand Cross in the Order of Saints Michael and George.
- Commander in the National Order of the Leopard.

== Bibliography ==
- Vincent Dujardin, Pierre Harmel, Brussels, Le Cri 2004.

Political offices
Preceded by Théo Lefèvre	Prime Minister of Belgium; 1965–1966	Succeeded by Paul Vanden Boeynants
Preceded by Paul Struye	President of the Senate; 1973–1977	Succeeded by Robert Vandekerckhove
Belgian nobility
New creation	Count Harmel; 1991–2009	Succeeded by Roger Harmel
