= Belgian economic miracle =

The Belgian economic miracle (French: Le miracle belge, Dutch: Het belgische wonder; literally "the Belgian miracle") was a period of rapid economic growth in Belgium after World War II, principally between 1945 and 1948.

The Belgian miracle was characterised by parallel trends of rising employment and real wages and low inflation, leading to improvements in living standards. It formed part of the period of rapid post-war economic expansion in Western Europe in the late 1940s and 1950s but preceded many other "economic miracles" and was notably shorter in duration.

The term has been criticised in relation to its possible contribution to the growing obsolescence of Belgian heavy industry in the 1950s and 1960s and emergence of deindustrialisation.

== Economic miracle ==
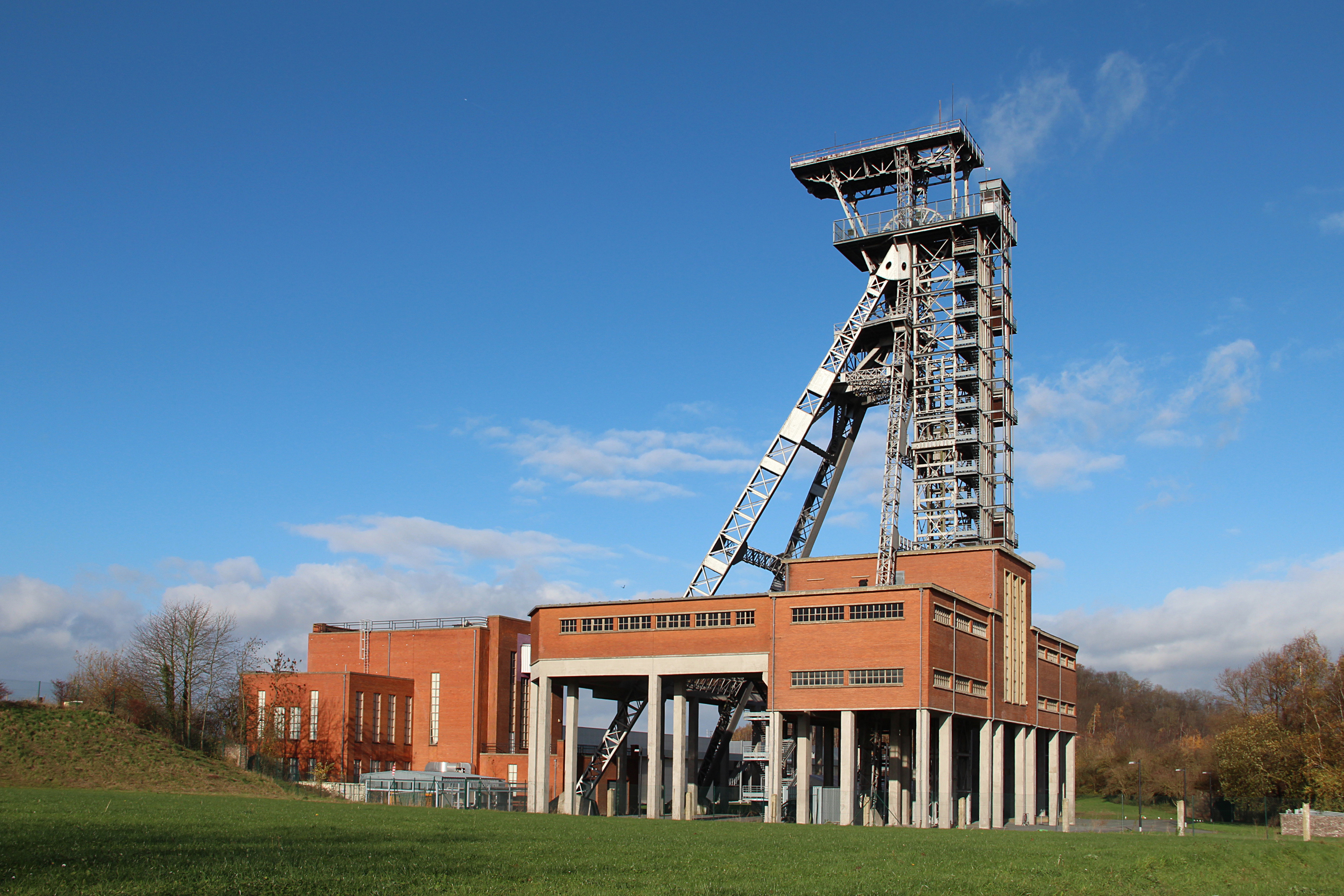
Modern-day view of a former coal mine at Frameries in Hainaut Province. Coal mining was one of the industries which drove Belgium's economic miracle

During World War II, Belgium had been occupied by Nazi Germany and had seen a deterioration in its gross domestic product through war damage and the economic policies pursued by the occupiers, despite the efforts of Alexandre Galopin and the Committee of Secretaries-General who attempted to preserve Belgium's industrial capacity through a policy of limited compromise with the German occupation authorities.

From 1945, however, demand for Belgium's traditional industries (steel and coal, textiles, and railway machinery in particular) grew across Europe, boosting the recovery of the Belgian economy. In comparison with neighbouring countries, whose industries had been heavily damaged by fighting, the comparatively intact Belgian industrial base was able to restore its capacity to respond to the rise in demand. In 1946, the government announced its intention to increase production in Belgium's important coal mining industries by inaugurating a "Battle for Coal" (Bataille du charbon). At the end of 1947, Belgium became the first former belligerent in Europe to reach its pre-war level of industrial output.

The economic miracle was also greatly facilitated by the monetary policy of Camille Gutt whose "Plan Gutt", begun in October 1944, reduced the money supply which had grown hugely during the occupation. The effect of the policy, which reduced the amount of circulating currency by two-thirds, was to limit inflation sharply and facilitate a general rise in living standards.

Living conditions for Belgian workers improved rapidly during the economic miracle. Historically, Belgium's urban workers had been paid less and lived in poorer conditions than those in comparable countries, even while the Belgian economy grew rapidly during the Industrial Revolution. This began to change during the economic wonder. In 1944, shortly after the Liberation, the Belgian government of Achille Van Acker introduced a series of social security reforms which began the rise in living standards. Labour shortages and demands for higher production, especially in coal mining, led to rising wages. By 1947 the wages of coal miners in the Borinage were 40 percent higher than they had been in 1938.

The economic miracle also demonstrated the national labour shortage, especially in coal sector. The Belgian government attempted to recruit labour abroad. It briefly employed 64,000 German prisoners of war as coal miners. In 1946, the Belgian government created a guest worker programme in Italy which led to the first significant wave of immigration into Belgium.

One of the causes of the end of the miracle was that Belgium only partially devalued the Belgian franc against the United States dollar in 1949 at the same time as other European countries. This raised the labour costs handicap of Belgian industry and led to increased unemployment in the 1950s.

== Criticism ==
Some historians have criticised the use of the term economic miracle to describe the period. According to historian Martin Conway, the term is "singularly inappropriate" to describe Belgian economic recovery during the period because "growth rates, salaries, and levels of investment lagged substantially behind, and production costs significantly above, those of Belgium's competitor economies". Government policy focused on monetary stability rather than on investment.

Surprised by the speed of the country's economic recovery, the Belgian government claimed little of the Marshall Aid that was being used by competitor economies to develop new industries. By 1953, Belgium's industrial production was 11 percent higher than its 1929 output, compared with a 70 percent difference in other Western European countries. The result was that Belgian heavy industry faced an "acute structural crisis" in the 1950s as industrial exports became uncompetitive. This led to the start of the deindustrialisation of Wallonia and the start of growing regional economic divergence between Wallonia and Flanders which would become visible during the general strike of winter 1960–61.

The study of the period was important in the formation of the economic thought of the economist Alexandre Lamfalussy, who wrote on the subject in the early 1960s.

== See also ==
- Social Pact, a 1944 Belgian agreement on social welfare reform
- Benelux Customs Union, agreed in 1944 and effective from 1948
- Marshall Plan, effective from 1948
- European Payments Union, 1950–58
- European Coal and Steel Community, which Belgium entered in 1952
