= Robert Gillon =

Belgian lawyer and liberal politician

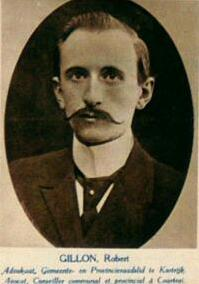
- 1925 campaign poster of Gillon

President of the Senate
- In office 5 May 1954 – 24 June 1958
- Preceded by: Paul Struye
- Succeeded by: Paul Struye
- In office 8 November 1949 – 27 June 1950
- Preceded by: Henri Rolin
- Succeeded by: Paul Struye
- In office 26 April 1939 – 11 November 1947
- Preceded by: Romain Moyersoen
- Succeeded by: Henri Rolin

Personal details
- Born: 10 December 1884 Kortrijk, Belgium
- Died: 25 July 1972 (aged 87) Kortrijk, Belgium
- Party: Liberal Party

Robert Paul Raymond Gillon (French: [ʒilɔ̃]; 10 December 1884 – 25 July 1972) was a Belgian lawyer and liberal politician.

He was a member of the municipal council of Kortrijk, member of the provincial council of West Flanders, three times President of the Belgian Senate (26 April 1939 - 11 November 1947, 8 November 1949 - 27 April 1950 and 5 May 1954 - 24 June 1958) and later became Minister of State in 1945.

== See also ==
- Liberal Party
- Liberalism in Belgium

Political offices
Preceded by Romain Moyersoen	President of the Senate; 1939–1947	Succeeded by Henri Rolin
Preceded by Henri Rolin	President of the Senate; 1949–1950	Succeeded by Paul Struye
Preceded by Paul Struye	President of the Senate; 1954–1958	Succeeded by Paul Struye
