= Christian Social Party (Belgium, 1945–68) =

Christian Social Party Christelijke Volkspartij Parti Social Chrétien
- Francophone logo, used c.1958
- Historical leaders: Jean Duvieusart (first); Jean-Charles Snoy et d'Oppuers (last)
- Founded: August 18, 1945
- Dissolved: 1968
- Preceded by: Catholic Block
- Succeeded by: Christelijke Volkspartij (CVP), Parti social chrétien (PSC)
- Headquarters: Brussels, Belgium
- Ideology: Christian democracy Pro-Europeanism
- Political position: Centre to Centre-right
- European affiliation: Christian Democrat group
- International affiliation: Christian Democrat International
- Colours: Orange; Black

The Christian Social Party (French: Parti Social Chrétien, pronounced [paʁti sɔsjal kʁetjɛ̃]; Dutch: Christelijke Volkspartij, pronounced [ˈkrɪstələkə ˈvɔlkspɑrˌtɛi], lit. 'Christian People's Party'; generally abbreviated to PSC–CVP) was a major political party in Belgium which existed from 1945 until 1968. It is sometimes referred to as the unitary Christian Social Party (PSC unitaire/unitaire CVP) to distinguish it from its two identically named successor parties.

Established as the successor to the pre-war Catholic Party, the PSC-CVP was established after Belgium's Liberation in World War II with an explicitly "deconfessionalised" orientation in the Christian Democratic tradition. It supported social welfare and limited economic redistribution. It remained the largest party in Belgian politics throughout much of its existence and was the last party in Belgian history to gain an outright majority in the 1950 elections. It provided a number of influential prime ministers and participated in most coalition governments in combination with the Belgian Socialist Party and the Liberal Party or its successor the Party for Freedom and Progress.

Amid rising regionalist tensions, the PSC-CVP's regional parties split along linguistic and regional lines between 1968 and 1972 to form the Francophone Christian Social Party (Parti Social Chrétien, PSC) and Flemish Christian People's Party (Christelijke Volkspartij, CVP).

== Background ==
Catholicism was a major social and political influence in Belgium even before the Belgian Revolution in 1830. Approximately 98 percent of the country's population were at least nominally Catholics. Although initially able to collaborate, the clash between Catholics and Liberals came to dominate Belgian politics by the 1840s and would give rise to the social phenomenon of "pillarisation". The clash finally culminated in Liberal defeat in the political struggle known as the First School War (1879-84). After 1884, the Catholic Party entered a period of almost unchallenged electoral dominance winning parliamentary majorities in every national election for 30 years. This was unparalleled elsewhere in Europe.

As the franchise expanded over the late 19th century, the Catholic Party was forced into making limited concessions on the issue of social reform but remained conservative and dominated by "bourgeois interests". The Catholic Party lost its electoral majority after World War I and was obliged to share power in a series of coalition governments. The historian Martin Conway writes that it marked "a period of unprecedented crisis for the party during which it struggled to retain its unity against a combination of social, ideological, and regional divisions".

The party's internal organisation was radically reformed in 1921 and again in 1936. Amid the Great Depression, it was challenged by a range of authoritarian, working class, and Flemish nationalist movements which drew heavily on Catholic voters. Although improving its fortunes in the final years before World War II, the party finally collapsed at the time of the German invasion of Belgium in May 1940.

== History ==
=== Formation, 1944-1946 ===
After the Liberation of Belgium from German occupation in September 1944, there was little support for resurrecting the pre-war Catholic Party. Martin Conway writes that "although all were agreed on the need to avoid a return to the Catholic Party of the inter-war years, Belgian Catholics emerged from the war with a renewed sense of their common purpose and a heightened optimism that the values of Catholicism did indeed offer a distinctive solution to the problems of a modern democratic society".

The Christian Social Party was formally established on 19 August 1945 under the presidency of August De Schryver. The new party's ideology drew heavily from personalism and sought to demonstrate its distance from the institutional Catholic Church by dropping the word "Catholic" in favour of the less sectarian term "Christian".

Participating in the first post-war elections in February 1946, it won nearly 43% of the national vote exceeding the total vote share gained by the Catholic Party at any previous elections since World War I. A separate new party attempting to attract left-leaning Christian Democratic voters called the Belgian Democratic Union (Union démocratique belge/Belgische Democratische Unie) failed to make an electoral breakthrough at the elections and was soon disbanded. The same elections also saw the re-emergence of liberal and socialist parties which, alongside the Christian Social Party, would dominate Belgian politics over the following two decades.

=== Christian Social Party in government, 1946-1954 and 1958-1968 ===
In contrast to the conservatism of the Catholic Party, the Christian Social Party (Parti social chrétien/Christelijke Volkspartij) stood on a democratic platform emphasising social reforms, welfare, industrial democracy, and moderate economic redistribution. It rallied to the monarchist cause during the Royal Question (1949-50) and supported King Leopold III's return to the throne. Standing on this issue, the party won the last bicameral majority in Belgian history in the 1950 general election. Although ultimately successful, Leopold's return proved politically divisive and caused widespread unrest in industrial regions of Wallonia. Seeking to de-escalate the crisis at its peak in Summer 1950, Leopold agreed to abdicate in favour of his son Prince Baudouin the following year. Leopold's abdication caused considerable agitation within the party and it was ultimately forced out of power in 1954.

In opposition, the party was revitalised in opposition to the Second School War (1954-58) initiated by the Liberal and Socialist parties which challenged the Church's continuing influence within the Belgian education system. It was eventually ended with a compromise in the form of the "School Pact" and the return of the Christian Social Party to government in the 1958 elections.

As a result of the economic fall-out from the independence of the Belgian Congo, the government of Gaston Eyskens introduced an austerity plan known as the Unitary Law in 1960. Opposition to the programme led to the 1960-61 general strike but failed to prevent its passage. Alongside increasing secularism within Belgian society and growing demands for federalising reforms in both Wallonia and Flanders, the dominance of the Christian Social Party finally came into question in late 1960s.

=== Linguistic split, 1968-1972 ===
As part of the unrest leading to the split of the Catholic University of Leuven, the government of Paul Vanden Boeynants refused to intervene to remove Francophone students from the university in accordance with the demands of Flemish student demonstrators. In response, Flemish ministers to withdraw from the government in February 1968. The regionalist Volksunie made significant inroads into the Christian Democratic vote in Flanders.

In the March 1968 general election, the regional Flemish (Christelijke Volkspartij) and Francophone (Parti Social Chrétien) parties stood on different programmes but continued to retain a single national president until 1972. They subsequently stood as entirely separate parties with different programmes and political identities, marking the collapse of the "unitary" Christian Social Party.

== Election results ==
=== Chamber of Representatives ===
Election	Votes	%	Seats	+/–	Position	Government
1946	1,006,293	42.5	92 / 202	▲19	1st	Opposition
1949	2,190,895	43.6	105 / 212	▲13	1st	Christian Social-Liberal coalition
1950	2,356,608	47.7	108 / 212	▲3	1st	Majority government
1954	2,123,408	41.2	95 / 212	▼13	1st	Opposition
1958	2,465,549	46.5	104 / 212	▲9	1st	_{Minority government until November 1958, later Christian Social-Liberal coalition}
1961	2,182,642	41.5	96 / 212	▼8	1st	Christian Social-Socialist coalition
1965	1,785,211	34.5	77 / 212	▼19	1st	_{Christian Social-Socialist coalition until March 1966, later Christian Social-Liberal coalition}
1968	1,643,785	31.8	69 / 212	▼8	1st	Christian Social-Socialist coalition

== Notable members ==
- Jean Duvieusart
- Gaston Eyskens
- Pierre Harmel
- Théo Lefèvre
- Joseph Pholien
- Paul Vanden Boeynants
- Jean Van Houtte
- Count Jean Charles Snoy et d'Oppuers

== See also ==
- Politics of Belgium
- Confederation of Christian Trade Unions
- Graves de communi re
