= Gaston Eyskens =

Belgian prime minister (1905–1988)

The High-born Gaston Eyskens
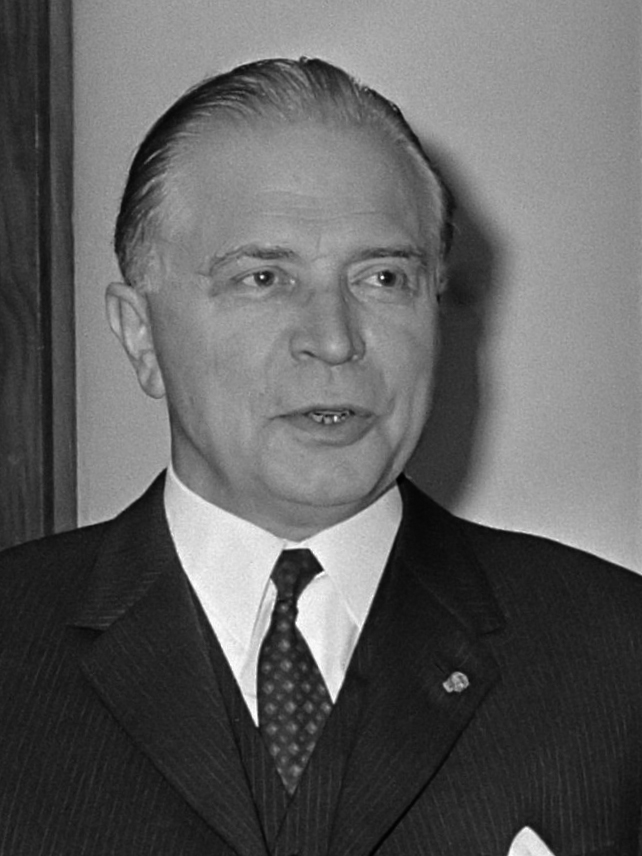
- Eyskens in 1969

Prime Minister of Belgium
- In office 17 June 1968 – 26 January 1973
- Monarch: Baudouin
- Preceded by: Paul Vanden Boeynants
- Succeeded by: Edmond Leburton
- In office 26 June 1958 – 25 April 1961
- Monarch: Baudouin
- Preceded by: Achille Van Acker
- Succeeded by: Théo Lefèvre
- In office 11 August 1949 – 8 June 1950
- Monarch: Leopold III
- Regent: Prince Charles
- Preceded by: Paul-Henri Spaak
- Succeeded by: Jean Duvieusart

Personal details
- Born: 1 April 1905 Lier, Belgium
- Died: 3 January 1988 (aged 82) Leuven, Belgium
- Party: Christian Social Party
- Spouse: Gilberte De Petter
- Education: Catholic University of Leuven; Columbia University

Gaston François Marie, Viscount Eyskens (1 April 1905 – 3 January 1988) was a Christian democratic politician and prime minister of Belgium. He was also an economist and member of the Belgian Christian Social Party (CVP-PSC).

He served three terms as the prime minister of Belgium, holding the position from 1949 to 1950, 1958 to 1961 and 1968 to 1973. During his periods in office, Eyskens was confronted with major ideological and linguistic conflicts within Belgium including the Royal Question in 1950, the School War in 1958, the independence of the Belgian Congo in 1960 and the split of the University of Leuven in 1970. He oversaw the first steps towards the federalization of Belgium (constitutional reform of 1970).

Eyskens led a centre cabinet in 1958, followed by two centre-right cabinets from 1958 to 1961, another centre cabinet from 1968 to 1972, and another centre-left cabinet from 1972 to 1973.

== Family ==
Eyskens was born in Lier, the son of Antonius Franciscus Eyskens (1875–1948) and Maria Voeten (1872–1960). On 10 August 1931 he married Gilberte De Petter (1902–1981), daughter of the Leuvener politician Emile De Petter, with whom he had two sons: Erik Eyskens (Leuven, 20 July 1935 – Antwerp, 31 August 2008) and Mark Eyskens. His son Mark also became Prime Minister, serving from 6 April 1981 to 17 December 1981.

== Career ==
=== Academic career ===
Eyskens studied at the Catholic University of Leuven where he gained a master and doctorate degree. In 1927 he became Master of Science at Columbia University. In 1931 Eyskens became a professor at the University of Leuven. He later became dean of the economics faculty. He also served on the board of Lovanium University in the Congo.

Eyskens was made doctor honoris causa by Columbia University, the University of Cologne and the Hebrew University of Jerusalem.

=== Political career ===
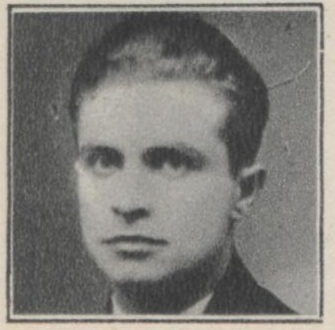
Gaston Eyskens

During the early 1930s Eyskens was chief of staff of CVP ministers Edmond Rubbens and Philip Van Isacker. In 1939 Eyskens was elected to the Belgian Chamber of Representatives. He was steadily re-elected (in 1946, 1949, 1950, 1954, 1958 and 1961) and served until 1965.

In 1945 and between 1947 and 1949 he was Minister of Finance. On 11 August 1949 he became Prime Minister of Belgium in a coalition (Eyskens I) between Christian-democrats and liberals. His cabinet fell in June 1950 over the constitutional crisis caused by King Leopold III's actions during the Second World War. In the short lived government of Jean Duvieusart (June–August 1950) Eyskens was Minister of Economic Affairs.

Between 26 June 1958 and 6 November 1958, Eyskens led a minority government which was the most recent government of Belgium (Eyskens II) not to be a coalition government. On 6 November, Eyskens formed a coalition government with the liberals (Eyskens III) which remained in power until 3 September 1960. On 3 September 1960 he formed his third government (Eyskens IV), again a coalition with the liberal party. This government fell on 25 April 1961 over the Unitary Law (which raised the fiscal pressure by 7 billion Belgian francs, cut spending in education and the military, and reformed unemployment benefits and government pensions) and had caused large-scale strikes.

During these years he also had to deal with the School War and the independence of the Belgian Congo. His office maintained "Secret Funds" on the bribes paid to Congolese, payments to Belgian secret agents and newspapers to disinform about Patrice Lumumba, the Prime Minister. [The documents were published in the Belgian inquiry into the assassination of Patrice Lumumba (Belgian Commission 2001: 653–655, 679–681, and passim) and in an article (Roosevelt 2020).]

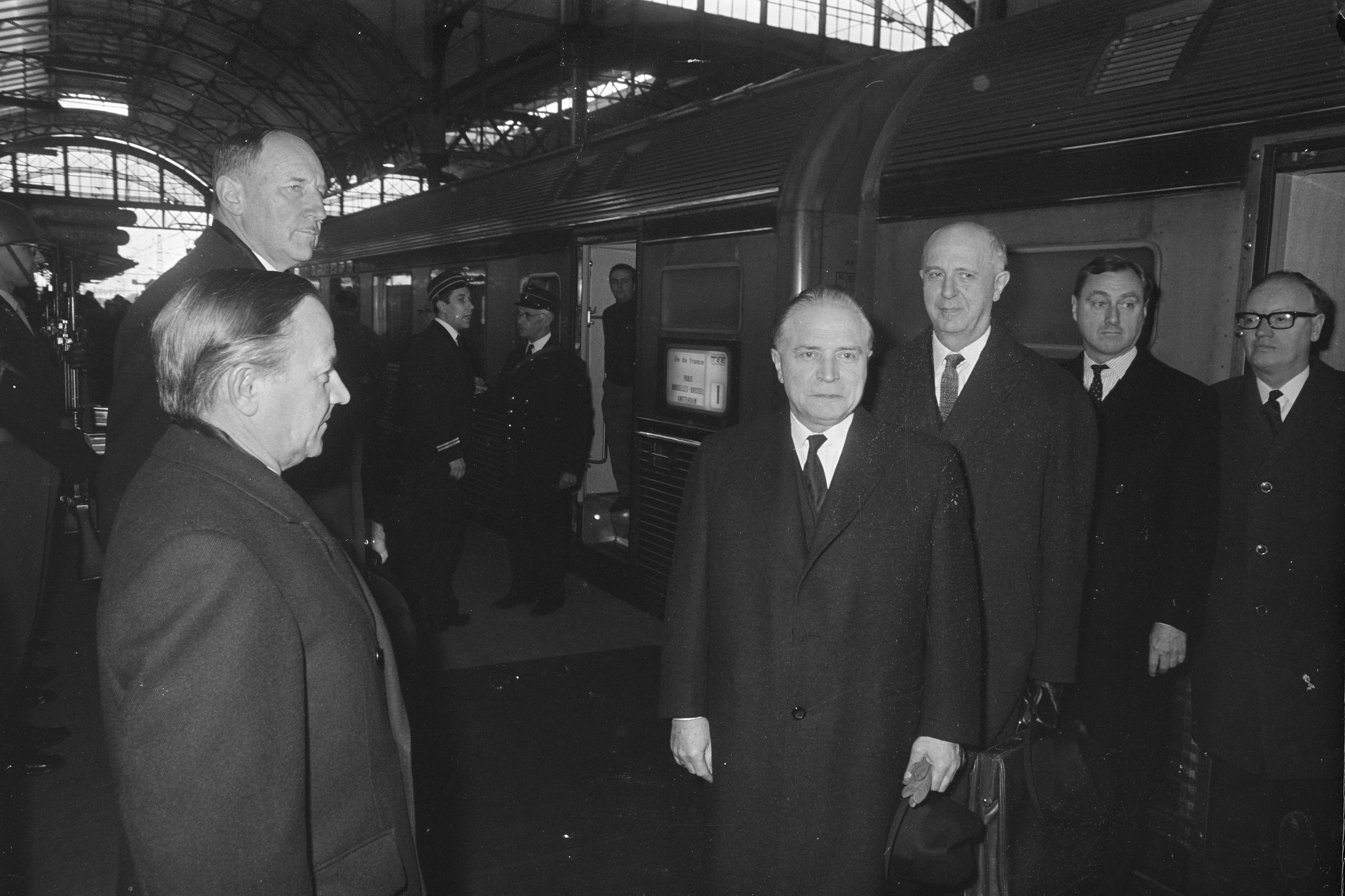
l.t.r. Joseph Luns, Piet de Jong, Gaston Eyskens and Pierre Harmel in 1969

In the general election of 1965 Eyskens was elected to the Belgian Senate (re-elected in 1968 and 1971). In the government led by Pierre Harmel (1965–1966) he again served as Minister of Finance. Student unrest and questions of discrimination against the ethnic Flemish population brought down the Belgian government in February 1968. On 17 June 1968, Gaston Eyskens formed his fifth government (Eyskens V); this time a centre-left coalition between the Christian Democrats and the Socialists. On 20 January 1973, he formed his sixth and last government (Eyskens VI), again a coalition with the Socialists.

His last two governments were plagued by linguistic troubles regarding the split of the old bilingual Catholic University of Leuven into a Dutch-language university (the Katholieke Universiteit Leuven), which stayed in Leuven and a French-language university which moved to Louvain-la-Neuve and became the Université catholique de Louvain and the start of the process of changing Belgium from a unitary state into a federation with the creation of the Communities. Upon the fall of his last government Gaston Eyskens retired from politics. He died in Leuven.

=== Honours ===
- Belgium: Minister of State by RD of 5 April 1963.
- Belgium: Created Viscount Eyskens by RD in September 1973.
- Belgium: Member of the Royal Academy.
- Belgium: Commander in the Order of Leopold II, by RD of 15 February 1946.
- Belgium: Knight Grand Cross in the Order of the Crown, by RD of 8 April 1954.
- Knight Commander in the Order of Saint Gregory the Great.

Political offices
Preceded by Paul-Henri Spaak	Prime Minister of Belgium; 1949–1950	Succeeded by Jean Duvieusart
Preceded by Achille Van Acker	Prime Minister of Belgium; 1958–1961	Succeeded by Théo Lefèvre
Preceded by Paul Vanden Boeynants	Prime Minister of Belgium; 1968–1973	Succeeded by Edmond Leburton
