= Jean Duvieusart =

Belgian politician (1900–1977)

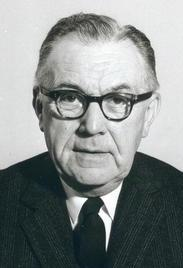

Prime Minister of Belgium
- In office 8 June 1950 – 16 August 1950
- Monarch: Leopold III
- Regent: Prince Charles; Prince Baudouin
- Preceded by: Gaston Eyskens
- Succeeded by: Joseph Pholien

President of the European Parliament
- In office 21 March 1964 – 24 September 1965
- Preceded by: Gaetano Martino
- Succeeded by: Victor Leemans

Personal details
- Born: 10 April 1900 Les Bons Villers, Belgium
- Died: 10 October 1977 (aged 77) Charleroi, Belgium
- Party: Christian Social Party

Jean Pierre Duvieusart (French pronunciation: [ʒɑ̃ pjɛʁ dyvjøzaʁ]; 10 April 1900 – 10 October 1977) was a Belgian politician of the PSC-CVP who served as the prime minister of Belgium from June to August in 1950.

== Political career ==
Jean Duvieusart became a member of the Chamber of Representatives in 1944, serving until 1949, when he became a member of the Senate. He was a member of the Senate until 1965.

Duvieusart served as Minister of Economic Affairs (1947-1950 and 1952-1954).

In 1950, he served two months as the 36th Prime Minister of Belgium but he resigned after the abdication of King Leopold III.

He was president of the European Parliament (1964–1965).

He left the PSC in 1965 and became president and co-founder of the Rassemblement wallon and the Front Démocratique des Bruxellois Francophones (FDF) (1968–1972).

== Personal life ==
On 8 July 1930, Duvieusart married Blanche Dijon (18 November 1907 – 24 February 1984) and had three sons and one daughter, Philippe (born 1932), Léopold (born 1933), Étienne (born 1935) and Thérèse (1939).

== See also ==
- Royal Question, Belgium

Political offices
Preceded by Gaston Eyskens	Prime Minister of Belgium; 1950	Succeeded by Joseph Pholien
