= Belgian Socialist Party =

Belgian Socialist Party French: Parti socialiste belge Dutch: Belgische Socialistische Partij
- The fist and rose emblem used by the party from 1973.
- President: Achille Van Acker (first); André Cools (last)
- Founder: Paul-Henri Spaak
- Founded: May 1945
- Dissolved: October 1978
- Preceded by: Belgian Labour Party
- Succeeded by: Socialist Party (Flemish); Socialist Party (Francophone)
- Headquarters: Brussels, Belgium
- Trade union wing: General Federation of Belgian Labour
- Ideology: Social democracy Democratic socialism
- Political position: Centre-left to left-wing
- European affiliation: Confederation of the Socialist Parties
- International affiliation: Socialist International
- Colours: Red

The Belgian Socialist Party (French: Parti Socialiste belge, pronounced [paʁti sɔsjalist bɛlʒ], PSB; Dutch: Belgische Socialistische Partij, pronounced [ˈbɛlɣisə ˌsoːɕaːˈlɪstisə pɑrˈtɛi], BSP) was a social-democratic political party which existed in Belgium from 1945 to 1978. During its time in office, a number of progressive social reforms were introduced.

The BSP was founded by activists from the Belgian Labour Party (1885–1940), which was the first Belgian socialist party. It ceased to function during the Second World War, while Belgium was under Nazi occupation. Its main support bases were the co-operative and trade union movements, and it won relatively more support in Wallonia. Like most Belgian political organisations, the party supported greater integration with the European Economic Community, albeit in a socialist context.

As linguistic and community issues became more divisive, the Belgian Socialist Party split into two new entities: the Flemish Socialist Party for the Flemish community and the Parti Socialiste (PS) for the Francophone community.

== Presidents ==
Presidents BSP/PSB
Period	President	
1942–1945	Achille Van Acker	
1945–1959	Max Buset	
1959–1971	Leo Collard	
Co-Presidents (from 1971)
Period	Dutch speaking co-President	French speaking co-President
1971–1973	Jos Van Eynde	Edmond Leburton
1973–1975	Jos Van Eynde	André Cools
1975–1977	Willy Claes	André Cools
1977–1978	Karel Van Miert	André Cools

== Election results ==
Election year	Votes		Seats	Change
Election year	Number	Percentage	Seats	Change
1946	746,738	31.57%	69 / 202	Steady
1949	1,496,539	29.76%	66 / 212	3
1950	1,705,781	34.51%	73 / 212	▲7
1954	1,927,015	37.34%	82 / 212	▲9
1958	1,897,646	35.79%	80 / 212	2
1961	1,933,424	36.72%	84 / 212	▲4
1965	1,403,107	28.28%	64 / 212	20
1968	1,403,107	27.10%	59 / 212	5
1971	549,483 623,395 **1,172,878**	10.40% 11.80% **22,20%**	25 / 212 25 / 212 50 / 212^{[a]}	9
1974	1,401,725	26.66%	59 / 212^{[b]}	▲9
1977	602,132 725,513 **1,327,645**	10.80% 13.01% **23,81%**	34 / 212 27 / 212 61 / 212^{[a]}	2

^{a} From the 1971 general election, the Belgian Socialist Party ran separate lists for Flanders and Wallonia; however, they still existed under a single party. The letters in bold thus show the results of the combined lists and consequently the true result of the Belgian Socialist Party in each election
^{b} Whilst the Belgian Socialist Party also ran separate lists for Flanders and Wallonia in the 1974 general election, there is no information on the results of separate lists, hence only the result for the combined lists is shown.

== See also ==
- Agusta scandal
- Charter of Quaregnon
- Socialist Party (francophone Belgium), also known as the Parti Socialiste or PS of Belgium, a French-speaking social democratic political party
- Vooruit, the Flemish social-democratic party in Belgium. It was formerly known as SP, then as SP.a
- General Labour Federation of Belgium (FGTB/ABVV), the main post-war socialist trade union federation
