= Joseph Pholien =

Belgian politician (1884–1968)

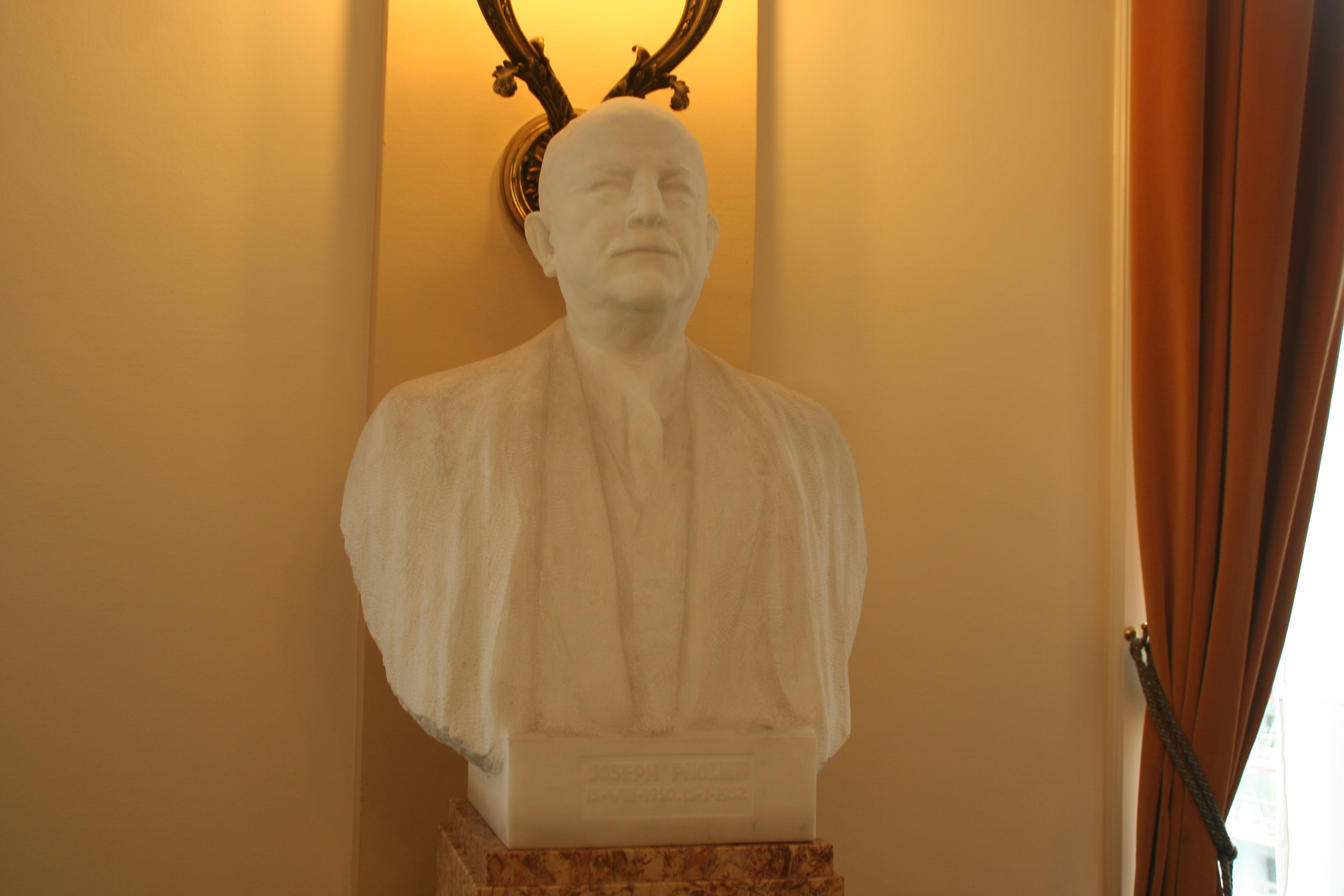
- Pholien's official portrait bust in the Belgian Federal Parliament

Prime Minister of Belgium
- In office 16 August 1950 – 15 January 1952
- Monarchs: Leopold III; Baudouin
- Preceded by: Jean Duvieusart
- Succeeded by: Jean Van Houtte

Personal details
- Born: 28 December 1884; Liège, Belgium
- Died: 4 January 1968 (aged 83); Brussels, Belgium
- Political party: Christian Social Party

Joseph Clovis Louis Marie Emmanuel Pholien (French pronunciation: [ʒozɛf klɔvis lwi maʁi emanɥɛl fɔljɛ̃]; 28 December 1884 – 4 January 1968) was a Belgian Catholic politician and member of the PSC-CVP. He was born in Liège, and volunteered to serve with the Belgian army during World War I, being commissioned as a first lieutenant. He was the minister of Justice under Paul-Henri Spaak from May 1938 to February 1939 and was the prime minister of Belgium from 16 August 1950 to 15 January 1952. In 1966, he became a minister of State.

His term as prime minister is notable for seeing the departure of the Belgian United Nations Command (BUNC) to fight in the Korean War (1950–1953).

He was the last Christian Democrat prime minister from Wallonia.

== Honours ==
- Belgium:
  - Croix de Guerre.
  - Minister of state, by Royal Decree.
  - Grand Officer in the Order of Leopold.
  - Knight Grand Cross in the Order of the Crown.
  - Knight Grand Cross in the Order of Leopold II.
- Thailand: Knight Grand Cross in the Order of the Crown of Thailand.
- Grand Officer in the Order of Merit of the Italian Republic.
- Commander in the Legion of Honour.

Political offices
Preceded by Jean Duvieusart	Prime Minister of Belgium; 1950–1952	Succeeded by Jean Van Houtte
