= Achille Van Acker =

Belgian socialist politician (1898–1975)

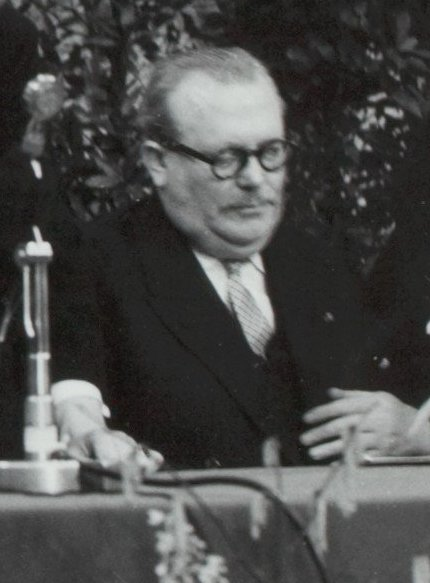
- Van Acker in 1958

Prime Minister of Belgium
- In office 23 April 1954 – 26 June 1958
- Monarch: Baudouin
- Preceded by: Jean Van Houtte
- Succeeded by: Gaston Eyskens
- In office 31 March 1946 – 3 August 1946
- Monarch: Leopold III
- Regent: Prince Charles
- Preceded by: Paul-Henri Spaak
- Succeeded by: Camille Huysmans
- In office 12 February 1945 – 13 March 1946
- Monarch: Leopold III
- Regent: Prince Charles
- Preceded by: Hubert Pierlot
- Succeeded by: Paul-Henri Spaak

President of the Chamber of Representatives
- In office 27 April 1961 – 30 April 1974
- Preceded by: Paul Kronacker
- Succeeded by: André Dequae

Personal details
- Born: 8 April 1898 Bruges, Belgium
- Died: 10 July 1975 (aged 77) Bruges, Belgium
- Party: Belgian Labour Party (1918–44); Belgian Socialist Party (1944–)

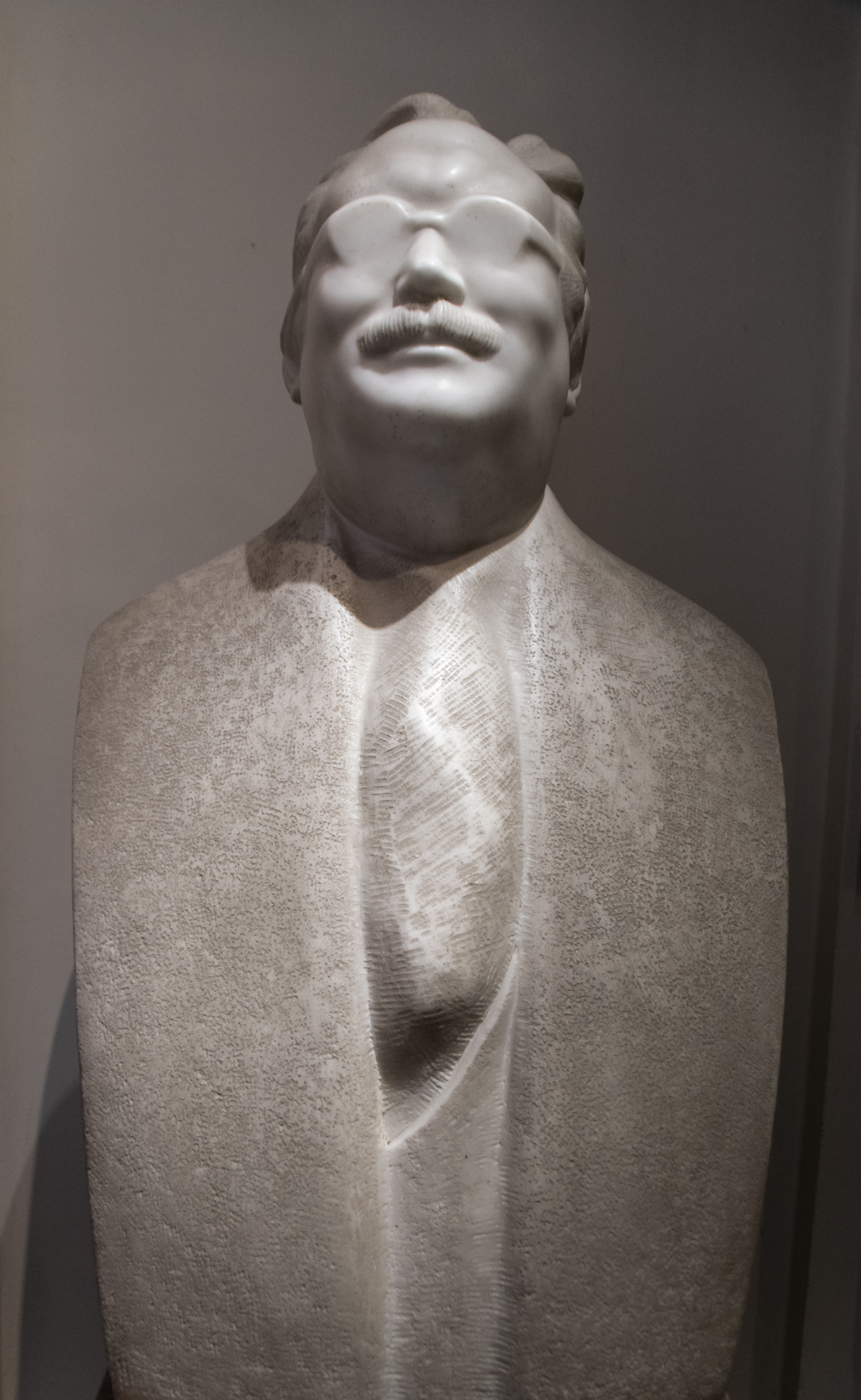
Bust of Achille van Acker in Bruges City Hall

Achille Van Acker (8 April 1898 – 10 July 1975) was a Belgian politician who served three terms as the prime minister of Belgium between 1945 and 1958. A moderate from Flanders, Van Acker was a member of the Belgian Socialist Party (PSB–BSP) and played an important role in the creation of the Belgian welfare state. He also organized the successful “coal battle” which stimulated coal production following the end of World War II and helped Belgium to recover rapidly economically.

== Biography ==
=== Early life ===
Achille Honoré Van Acker was born into a working class family in Bruges, West Flanders, Belgium in 1898 as the youngest of 12 children. Van Acker was the son of a basket maker, and left school at age ten to work in the same trade. According to one study, his life “exemplified the transition of the economy of Flanders from pre-industrial poverty to post-industrial wealth.”

Despite entering the workforce, Van Acker read widely and joined several social associations in Bruges. At the outbreak of World War I, he was refused by the Belgian Army because he suffered from astigmatism. While the Germans occupied most of Belgium, Van Acker fled into the small section of unoccupied territory behind the Yser Front where he worked in various menial capacities. Mixing with Belgian soldiers during the war, Van Acker became involved in socialist politics, developing a distinctive ideology based on moderate social democracy. After the end of the war, he returned to Bruges and joined the left leaning Belgian political party, the Belgian Labour Party (Belgische Werkliedenpartij, POB–BWP) and became active in socialist groups, trade unions, and cooperatives.

In 1926, Van Acker was elected to a position in Bruges' city council and, in 1927, became a POB–BWP member of the Chamber of Representatives aged 29. In his early years in parliament, Van Acker developed particular expertise in social security legislation.

Van Acker spoke fluent French with an accent, and was known to pronounce ‘ch’ as ‘z’ which made him the subject of ridicule by some, but this reinforced his image as someone ordinary people could identify with. In later years, when serving as prime minister, Van Acker’s background provided him with the image of a man of the people in contrast to the bourgeois background of much of the political elite, as noted by one historian:

Rather than a statesman or intellectual, the Prime Minister seemed to be a man of the people to whom his fellow citizens wrote, ‘auprès d’un bon feu,’ to thank him for having brought warmth to ordinary homes. This was an image carefully fostered by Van Acker who used his highly effective radio talks to portray himself with a Rooseveltian intimacy as the personification of Belgian virtues of hard work and ‘bon sens.’ In contrast to the American president, however, Van Acker’s common touch was no mere patrician affectation. His sense of the preoccupations of ordinary people was far from unerring but it remained one of his strongest political assets, enabling him to win reluctant assent for unpopular policies such as wage control. Indeed, it is tempting to see in Van Acker’s popularity a reflection of the wider public aspiration in the post-liberation era for a politics which was more democratic, more accountable, and closer to the people.

=== Later years ===
In May 1940, Belgium was invaded by Nazi Germany. Following the Belgian surrender and the start of the German occupation, the head of the POB–BWP Henri de Man announced the dissolution of the socialist party as part of a policy of collaborationism. Van Acker retreated from public life. In 1941, however, he rejoined the illegal socialist party and underground trade union movement under the nom de guerre "Monsieur André" and travelled around the country making contact with party sections. As a means of improving his underground disguise, he grew a moustache. At the Liberation of Belgium in September 1944, Van Acker emerged as the head of the POB–BWP's successor party, the Belgian Socialist Party (Belgische Socialistische Partij, PSB-BSP).

During World War II, as noted by one observer, “he relentlessly worked at a solution of labor-management relations and succeeded in obtaining the agreement of all political parties interested.”

After the Second World War, Van Acker became Prime Minister of Belgium in four different cabinets and served as Minister of Labour and Social Services, Minister of Public Health, Minister of Mobility and Minister of Mining (which led to his nickname). He was named Minister of State in 1958.

=== Social policy ===
During Van Acker's first premiership, compulsory disability insurance and compulsory health insurance for manual and non-manual workers was introduced in March 1945 and from January 1946 onwards health insurance funds earmarked a special contribution that covered the costs of preventive open-air cures. The government also improved miner’s wages and welfare allowances to the point that they went from being amongst the lowest-paid to the highest-paid members of the Belgian workforce.

A Decree-Law of 13 December 1945 legally ratified "the regulations for road accidents that have existed since 1942." In addition, as noted by one study, "In the first organic unemployment scheme (decree of the Regent of 26 May 1945) the principle of a generalized right to unemployment was registered, without taking into account the possible needy situation of the unemployed person held."

To improve health and safety in mines, a decree was introduced in December 1945 providing for the compulsory use in dusty places of devices "capable of allaying or suppressing coal and stone dust." A number of laws were also passed from April 1945 onwards that liberalized entitlement to allowances for deportees of foreign nationality.

An Order of October 1945 issued general regulations for the medical control of workers in industrial and commercial undertakings, public services and public utilities. Another order introduced that month issued general regulations concerning personal equipment for health protection. Following a 1940 law that enabled homeowners wishing to begin reconstruction of their properties to apply for a repair loan at a low rate of interest, an Act was passed in December 1945 that enabled them to acquire an interest-free advance on their compensation. That same month, a Supreme Council for Hygiene in Mines was established with the aim of furthering the progress of industrial hygiene. In February 1946, the formation of safety and hygiene committees was made compulsory. Titles I and II of general regulations for the protection of labour, dated 11 February 1946, "which constitute a codification of the Belgian labour protection legislation, were approved by an Order of the Regent on 11 February 1946."

In September 1945, workers’ compensation was extended to household maids, and for accidents to and from work in December 1945. A Legislative Order of January 1946 regulating annual holidays covered all persons "bound by contracts for the hiring of services or by contracts of apprenticeship," and laid down the essential principles for the grant of paid holidays, "leaving scope for their adaptation to the special needs of the various branches of industrial activity."

The first three cabinets led by Van Acker were short-lived because of the crisis pertaining to Leopold III which held Belgium in its grip from 1944 to 1951.

Further reforms were carried out by Van Acker's fourth cabinet including initiatives to expand social spending on pensions, housing, employment, and education and to reduce the term of compulsory military service from 21 to 18 months.

Under a royal order of July the 16th 1954, a person engaged in home crafts (as noted by one study) “is entitled to compensation in respect of any period of unemployment of not less than six working days, whereas hitherto such a person was entitled to benefit only in respect of complete weeks of unemployment.” An order of December the 14th 1954 provided for free non-contributory health assistance for invalid miners, while also extending entitlement to non-contributory health assistance (as noted by one study) “to old-age pensioners or invalids (not less than 150 days of sickness) who were political prisoners, prisoners of war, deportees for forced labour or members of the active or passive civil resistance and have been compulsorily or voluntarily insured without interruption since 1 January 1946.” A royal order of June the 30th 1954 raised (as noted by one study) “the pension supplements for salaried employees and their widows to the same amount as those for wage-earners and their widows.”

An Act of July the 20th 1955 forbade performances of music-hall or circus aerial acrobatics without a protective net, while orders issued on July the 1st and November the 18th 1955 set up (as noted by one study) “general or special training courses which unemployed women may be called on to follow.” A 45-hour workweek was also introduced in 1955, and a law was passed in 1956 that doubled holiday leave entitlement from 6 to 12 days. Earnings-related pension schemes were introduced for manual workers (1955), seamen (1956), and white-collar workers (1957). As noted by one study, "The laws of 21 May 1955 (workers) and 12 July 1957 (clerks) take over the principles of the 1953 law with an extension. Every pensioner is entitled to a pension calculated according to the length of his career and at 60 per cent. (single persons) or 75 pc. (family pension) of the gross revalued earned wages." Allowances were introduced in 1955 to cover demolition and rehousing while pension contributions were made obligatory in 1956.

An Act of June 1954 increased the minimum pension and introduced index-linking of for pension benefits, while an Act of July 1957 introduced a wage-related pension formula for white-collar workers. Under the 1955 Collard Act, municipalities could admit private schools only "after they had created public-sector ones and only where there a need for them was felt." New schools were also built, and in the 1956 budget, provision was made (for the first time) for the purchase by the state of school supplies for "the benefit of pupils in primary and nursery-infant sections attached to state secondary education establishments."

An Act of June the 30th 1956 provided that independent workers of both sexes could, under certain conditions, receive an old-age pension at the end of their careers, while an Act of July the 11th 1956 extended the application of a previously Act dated December the 30th 1929 “to compensation for injuries suffered by seamen as a result of industrial accidents.” A Royal order of July the 24th 1956 extended the coverage of family allowances to several categories of employers and non-wage-earning workers. A royal order of December the 14th 1956 prohibited (as noted by one study) “the employment of children under sixteen on underground work in mines, surface workings and quarries.” An Act of June the 28th 1956, together with a royal order of August the 4th 1956, granted educational allowances (as noted by one study) “to pupils who are the orphans of war victims and are in difficult circumstances.”

A royal order of May the 23rd 1957 provided for the establishment of a national centre for vocational information and guidance and the preliminary selection of occupations for workers under the age of 25, while an Act of July the 15th 1957 forbade the employment of boys under the age of 18 in underground areas of mines, surface mines and quarries. Previously, the minimum employment age was set at 14. An Act of July the 17th 1957, as noted by one study, “supplements the provisions of the Act of 10 June 1952 respecting the health and safety of workers. All employers shall set up a workplace safety, hygiene and improvement service; if they employ fifty or more workers, they shall also set up committees based on parity representation, for the same purpose.” Also in 1957, an age allowance was introduced, and a law of March 1958 made public authorities responsible for the cost of transporting (where necessary) abnormal and similarly handicapped children to special schools. In addition, a law of April the 28th 1958 established a social rehabilitation scheme for the disabled.

=== Foreign policy ===
Van Acker also focused on international affairs during the course of his political career. During his first premiership he was an advocate of what he termed an “occidental bloc” comprising Denmark, Holland, Belgium and Holland that would grow “out of financial and economic agreements leading to unity in the cause of peace and prosperity.” He asserted that the “Anglo-Saxon countries must realize that the political power of Europe is in new hands, and they must prepare to accept that fact.” Van Acker was also pleased with the coming to power of the Labour Party in Britain, believing that it would influence other European left-wing groups while also expressing surprise at the extent of its victory. In regards to Germany, Van Acker didn’t agree with the Dutch prime minister that Germany “as a sound economic unit is important to the prosperity of western Europe,” and believed in Germany being broken up into three or four nations as a way of preventing it from achieving power again. Later, in 1958, he signed an economic union agreement with Luxembourg and the Netherlands. Van Acker was also described (in a 1959 study) as “a key figure in the movement to unify western Europe and a staunch supporter of NATO.”

Van Acker was opposed to the Schuman Plan, which led to the establishment of the European Coal and Steel Community (ECSC), in contrast to most of the PSB. Although the PSB’s pro-European wing (as noted by one study) “made support for ECSC conditional on the preservation of the advanced wage standards of Belgian workers” many Socialists remained unconvinced by the efforts of Paul-Henrri Spaak, with Van Acker believing that mining employment and wage standards “were not sufficiently safeguarded.”

=== Literary interests ===
Van Acker was also the editor of a regional socialist weekly and wrote home poetry, along with a novel, and was a small-scale publisher. His publications (which were low price) were geared towards working people, and the first volume he published was a Flemish translation of Epictetus.

=== Later life and death ===
Van Acker continued to be politically involved long after his final premiership. In the early Sixties, he intervened in the Belgian general strike of 1960–1961, arguing that its losses outweighed any gains strikers hoped to achieve by rejecting the austerity bill that precipitated the strike, and believed that the government should work with the socialists to work around the impasse. The former wished to reduce welfare benefits and increase taxes, and while Van Acker acknowledged that there was a need for more taxes, he noted that “if the present atmosphere created by the strike continues, it will be completely impossible to find a solution.” He suggested that government proposals for cutting unemployment benefit claims should be studied by an independent committee before taking effect; a proposal that Gaston Eyskens agreed that Parliament should consider. The austerity bill was eventually passed, with Van Acker believing that the bill had been pursued for reasons of vanity and called for the government’s resignation. Nevertheless, Van Acker played a moderating role between the socialist trade unions and the Eyskens III government during the strike, and this laid the foundations for the Catholic-socialist Lefevre government.

From 1961 to 1974, Van Acker served as speaker of the house, a position where, as noted by one study, “he managed to stay above inter- and intra-party conflicts and was widely respected as an unpretentious elder statesman.”

Van Acker died on 11 July 1975, at the age of 77.

== Authography ==
- Moederweelde (Bruges, 1926).
- Drie Sterren (Bruges, 1962).
- Puntdichten en Grafschriften (Tielt, 1968).

== Honours ==
- Belgium: Minister of state, By royal decree of 23 December 1958.
- Belgium: Grand Cordon in the Order of Leopold.
- Belgium: Knight Grand cross in the Order of the Crown.
- Belgium: Knight in the Order of Leopold II.
- Knight Grand cross in the Order of Orange-Nassau.
- Knight Grand cross in the Legion of Honour.
- Knight Grand cross in the Order of the Oak Crown.
- Knight Grand cross in the Order of the White Rose of Finland.

Political offices
Preceded by Hubert Pierlot	Prime Minister of Belgium; 1945–1946	Succeeded by Paul-Henri Spaak
Preceded by Paul-Henri Spaak	Prime Minister of Belgium; 1946	Succeeded by Camille Huysmans
Preceded by Jean Van Houtte	Prime Minister of Belgium; 1954–1958	Succeeded by Gaston Eyskens
Preceded by Paul Kronacker	President of the Chamber of Representatives; 1961–1974	Succeeded by André Dequae
