= History of Wallonia =

The history of Wallonia, from prehistoric times to the present day, is that of a territory which, since 1970, has approximately coincided with the territory of Wallonia, a federated component of Belgium, which also includes the smaller German-speaking Community of Belgium (73,000 inhabitants). Wallonia is the name colloquially given to the Walloon Region. The French word Wallonie comes from the term Wallon, itself coming from Walh. Walh is a very old Germanic word used to refer to a speaker of Celtic or Latin (cf. Wales).

== Prehistory ==
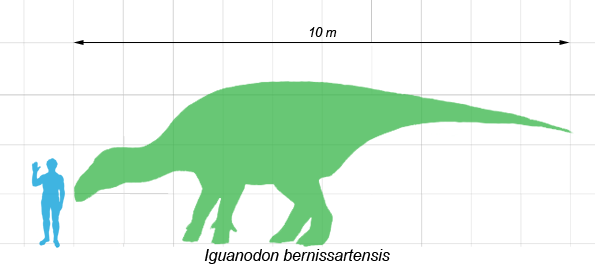
Iguanodon bernissartensis compared in size to a human.

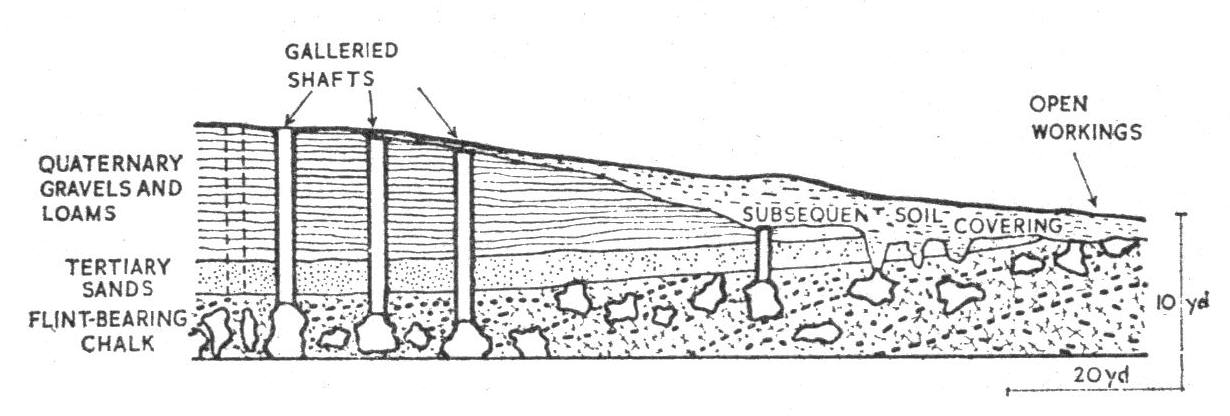
Section of mines at Spiennes

As of 2014, the largest find of the fossilised remains of Iguanodon to date occurred in 1878 in a coal mine at Bernissart, at a depth of 322 metres (1,056 ft). I. bernissartensis, that lived from the Barremian to the early Aptian (Early Cretaceous) in Europe, between about 130 and 120 million years ago.

The Grotte de Spy (Spy Cave) is located near Spy, Belgium, in the Walloon municipality of Jemeppe-sur-Sambre in the province of Namur. It was discovered in 1886 and has been classified as Wallonia's Major Heritage. It is one of the most important paleolithic sites in Europe. The excavation was conducted by Marcel de Puydt and Max Lohest of Liège. They proved the existence of the Neanderthal. Fraipont published an article about the cave in the American Anthropologist.

Spiennes, another famous Walloon village in the municipality of Mons, Province of Hainaut, has well known neolithic flint mines that are included on UNESCO's list of World Heritage Sites. The entry on the list describes them as "the largest and earliest concentration of ancient mines in Europe" and cites the level of early technological development they demonstrate as justification for their inclusion.

== Antiquity ==
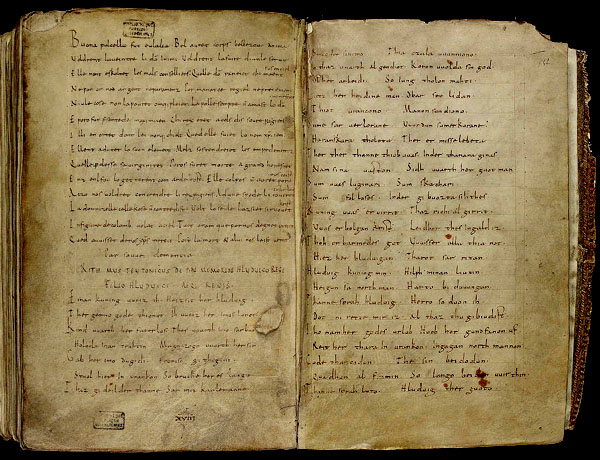
Séquence de sainte Eulalie

According to the region's official website, after Julius Caesar conquered Gaul, its inhabitants became the Gallo-Romans and were called the "Walha" by their Germanic neighbours, from whence the name Wallonia comes. The Walha started speaking Vulgar Latin instead of their Celtic dialects. At that time, Wallonia was on the border between Germanic-speaking and Latin-speaking territories. Historian Léopold Genicot wrote in his review Toudi n° 1, 1987, p." of an "enclave" in "the area of the Germanic languages". According to Hervé Hasquin, Francis Dumont described the Walloon territory as "a kind of isthmus" connecting old France and old Germany.

Félix Rousseau said Wallonia has always been a Romance land since the Gallic Wars and constitutes a Latin avant-garde in Germanic Europe. In his book La Wallonie, Terre Romane (Wallonia, a Romance Land) he says:

For centuries, the land of the Walloons has been and has never ceased to be a Romance land. That is the capital fact of the history of the Walloons that explains their ways of thought, feeling, and belief. Moreover, in the whole Romance world, the land of the Walloons, caught between Germanic territories, occupies a special position, the position of a vanguard. In fact a border about 300km long separates these extremi Latini from the Flemish to the North and from the Germans to the East.

According to Genicot, the most remarkable evidence of the Romance identity of Wallonia is the Sequence of Saint Eulalia because of its traits of Walloon, Picard, Lorrain, which may have been located in Wallonia or adjacent to it. Its origin must be located "in a region between Tournai and Liège, and it was written around 880".

== The longue durée event of the language border ==
According to Fernand Braudel, the most important event of Walloon history—and that of Belgian history—is the Barbarian invasions, which he says is an interesting example of the longue durée event. Braudel wrote that the result of the Germanic invasions—the language border—is "a contemporary and living circumstance" and that "Belgium divided into two parts along a language border". This border, separating the Germanic and Roman sprachraums, moved over the centuries preceding the establishment of the Belgian state over an area between the Ardennes and the line from Aachen to Calais and the more sparsely populated frontier from Aachen to Arlon via Malmedy. This frontier has not much changed since the 18th century. Flanders is to the north of the line and Wallonia to the south. According to Kenneth D. McRae, this language border "acquired administrative significance for the first time in 1822 with [William I of the Netherlands'] legislation on the use of Dutch in Flemish communes".

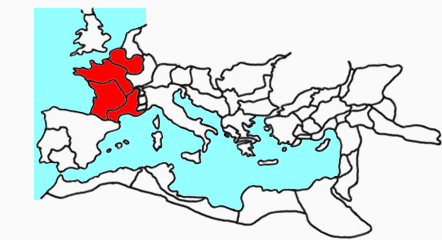
Gaul, conquered by Julius Caesar, was a part of the Roman Empire. The result of this is French-speaking Europe: France, Wallonia, Brussels, and French-speaking Switzerland, with their regional languages (see following map).

Languages of France. Wallonia is in the NE, containing almost the whole Walloon language (dark green), a small part of the Picard language (light green to the West), and another small part of the Lorrain language (light green to the South).

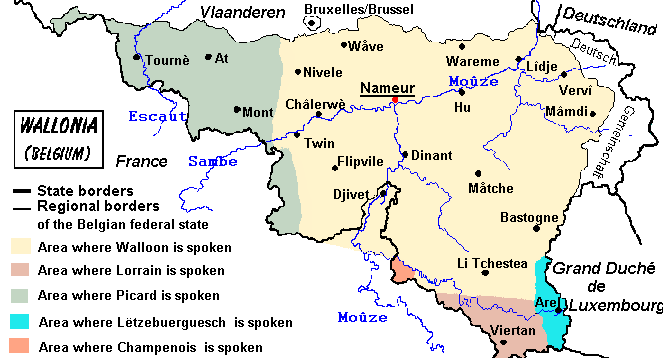
Regional languages of Wallonia: Walloon language (yellow), Picard language (green) and Lorrain language (brown), with a small area of Champenois (and smaller Germanic areas (blue or white))

Area of the Walloon language (the most important one): the white-coloured areas are those of the Picard language, Lorrain language, and Champenois. Some old smaller current Germanic areas.

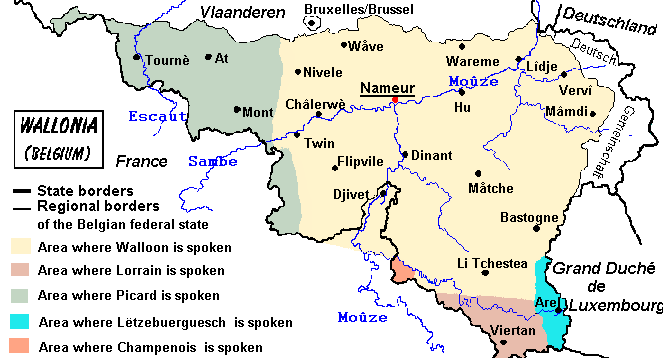
Regional languages of Wallonia.

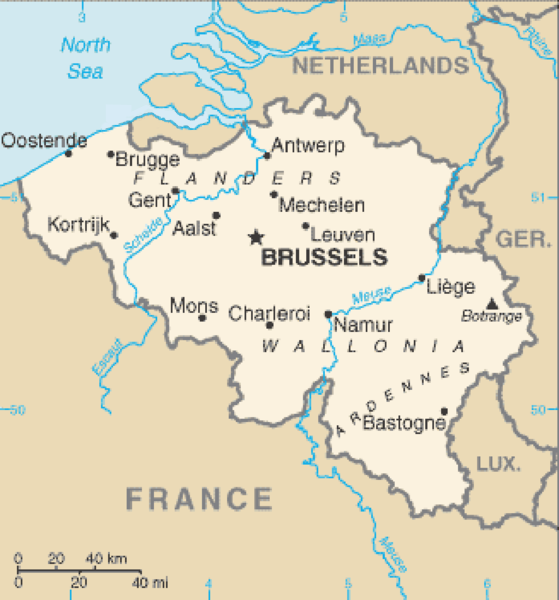
Wallonia in relation with Belgium and the neighbouring countries: France, Germany etc.

Political Wallonia among the other Regions.
Flemish Region
Brussels-Capital Region
Walloon Region

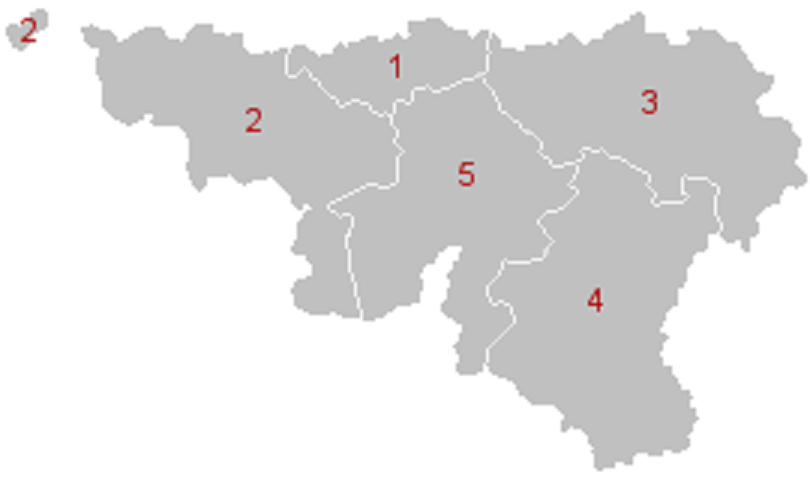
The five provinces of Wallonia: Walloon Brabant (1), Hainaut (2), Liège (3), Luxembourg (4), Namur (5).

== Industry ==
The Ardennes is an old mountain mass formed during the Hercynian orogeny. At the bottom of these old mountains, coal, iron, zinc, and other metals are often found in the sub-soil. In the north and west of the Ardennes lie the valleys of the Sambre and Meuse rivers, forming the Sillon industriel, an arc stretching across the most industrial provinces of Wallonia, Hainaut, along the river Haine, the Borinage, the Centre and Charleroi along the river Sambre and Liège along the river Meuse. This geological region is at the origin of the economy, the history, and the geography of Wallonia. "Wallonia presents a wide range of rocks of various ages. Some geological stages internationally recognized were defined from rock sites located in Wallonia, e.g. Frasnian (Frasnes-lez-Couvin), Famennian (Famenne), Tournaisian (Tournai), Viséan (Visé), Dinantian (Dinant) and Namurian (Namur)." The Tournaisian excepted, all these rocks are in the geological area of Ardennes.

The Ardennes includes the greatest part of the Belgian province of Luxembourg, the south of the province of Namur, the province of Liège, and a very small part of Hainaut. The first furnaces in the four Walloon provinces were in this area, before the 18th century using charcoal made in the Ardennes forest. This industry was also found in Gaume in the south of the province of Luxembourg. After the 18th century, the most important part of the Walloon steel industry, now using coal, was built around the coal mines, principally around the cities of Liège, Charleroi, La Louvière, the Borinage, and also in Walloon Brabant in Tubize. Wallonia became the second industrial power of the world, in proportion to its territory and to its population.

The Industrial Revolution in the Sillon industriel embraced four industrial basins: Borinage, La Louvière—called Centre, Charleroi and Liège, and a semi-industrial basin in Namur. According to Peter N. Stearns, the area was an important centre for iron manufacture for the Roman Empire. After the empire's fall, brass and bronze became favourable and the centres of metalworking shifted to Huy and the forested areas around Dinant and Chimay. In the twelfth and thirteenth centuries, the Walloon method, involving the use of a blast furnace, was developed in Liége, making it possible to substitute bronze with iron. The few coal mines around Liège, Charleroi, and the Borinage produced coal for breweries, dyeworks, soap and brick factories, and in the fourteenth century by the glassmaking industry in the Charleroi basin. At that time, coal mining was a part-time activity carried on by rural peasants to supplement their incomes.

=== The Walloon process in the Middle Ages ===
During the Late Middle Ages, the demand for iron for artillery caused important technological developments in iron working to occur in Wallonia, especially in the County of Namur, County of Hainaut, and Principality of Liège; this was called the Walloon process. It consists of making pig iron in a blast furnace, then refining it in a finery forge. The process was devised in the Liège region and spread into France and thence from the Pays de Bray to England before the end of the 15th century. Louis de Geer took it to Roslagen, Sweden, in the early 17th century, where he employed Walloon ironmakers. Iron made there by this method was known in England as oregrounds iron.

=== The beginning of the Industrial Revolution ===
The beginning of the Industrial Revolution in Wallonia, like elsewhere in Europe, was predicated on the location of coal mines, particularly in coal-rich Hainaut and Liège. Moreover, the French annexation of Belgium, although initially chaotic, gave Walloon industries access to the larger French market and protection from British competition, aiding early industrial experimentation. In 1799, English emigrant William Cockerill built the first water-powered carding and spinning machine for the wool industry, sparking off the rise of the modern machine-building sector. Wallonia's first industrialisation wave took place from 1800 to 1820.

Peter N. Stearns wrote that the development of the puddling process and the improvement of the blast furnace after 1750 accelerated the substitution of coke for charcoal. The first puddling furnace in Belgium was installed in 1821, and two years later the first coke-fed blast furnace was installed there. By 1870, except in a few small establishments in Luxembourg and Namur, the extensive use of charcoal in metalworking had been discontinued. Metal production moved from forests close to the coal-producing areas Charleroi and Liège. Newcomen-type steampumps were used in mines near Liège by 1723 and at Charleroi by 1725. The first steam engines based on James Watt's modifications appeared about 1803 in a Liège cannon foundry. The two engines installed there was producing 100,000 horsepower by 1860.

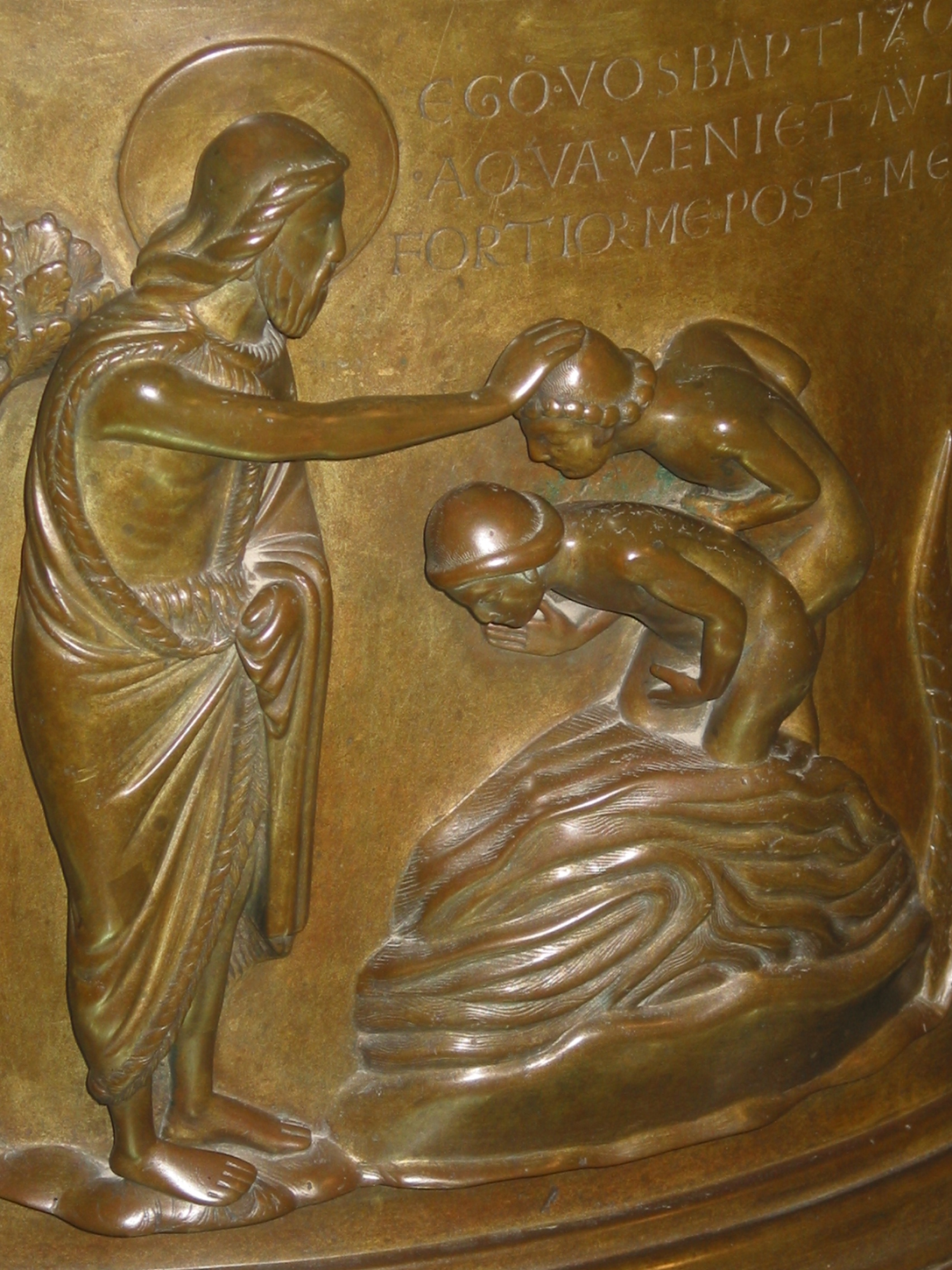
Font of Renier de Huy (Mosan art): The baptism of the catechumens. An example of old Walloon technique in making the brass I (12th century).

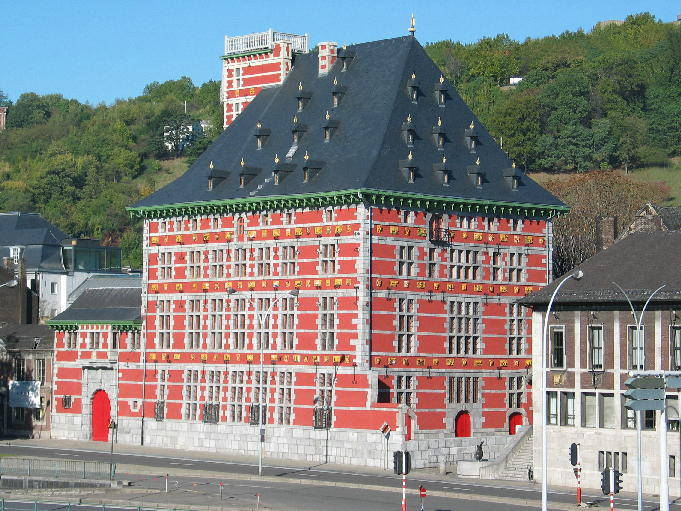
The splendid house of Curtius in Liège, one of the first capitalists.

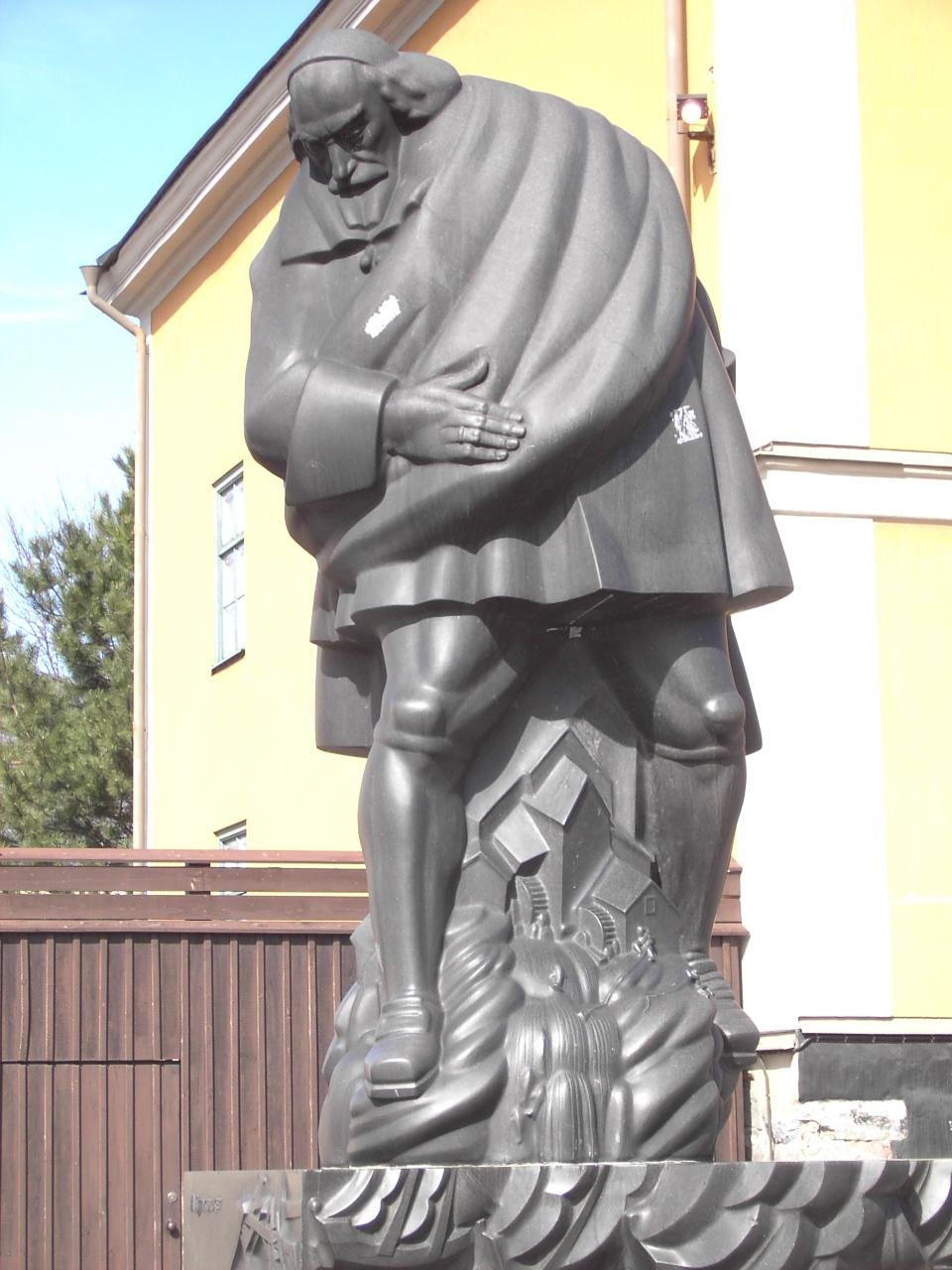
Statue of the Walloon Louis de Geer (1587–1652) in Norrköping, Sweden (1945; the sentence at the bottom of the statue speaks of him as the "father of the industry in Sweden").

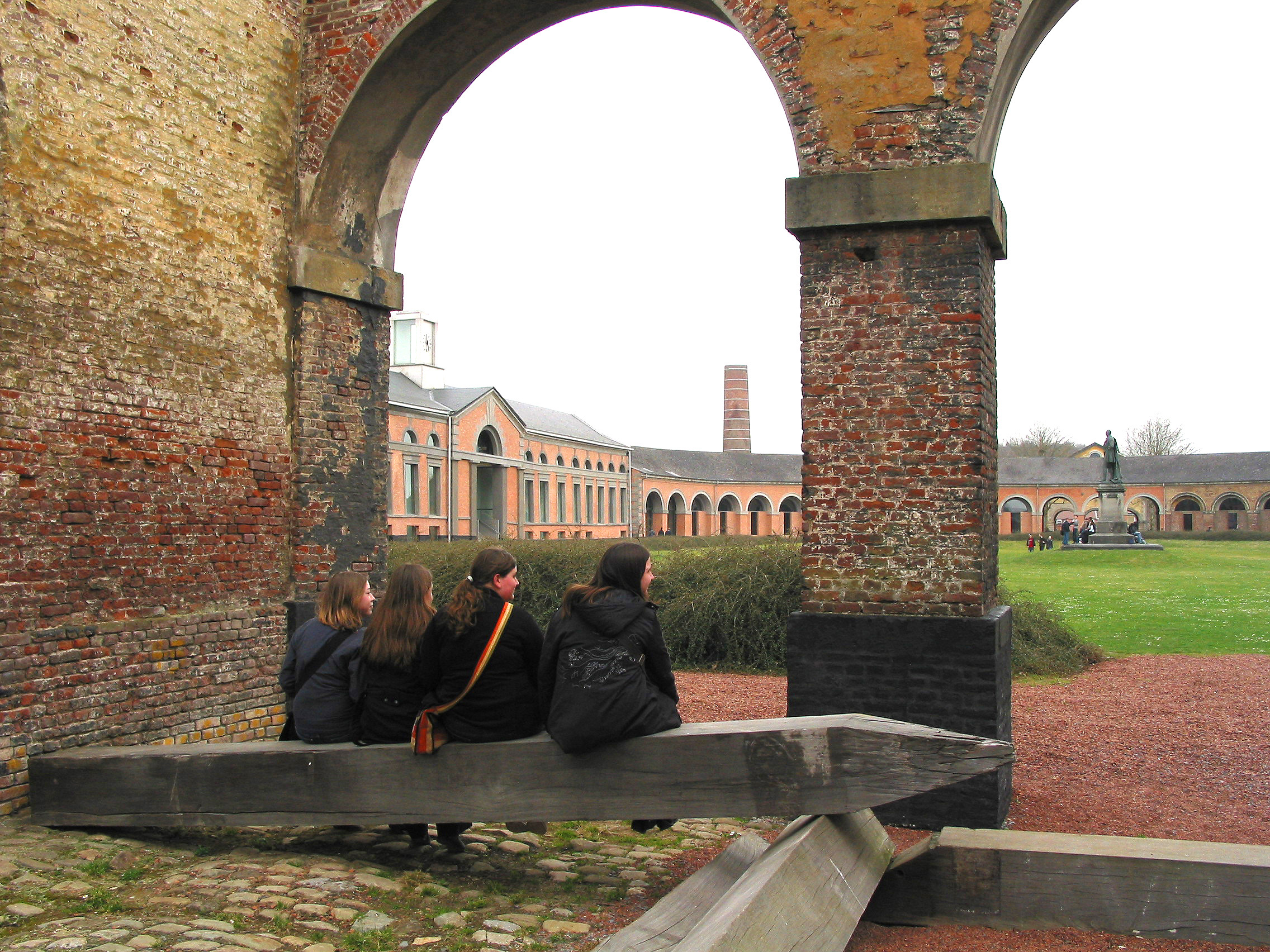
View of the oval courtyard and the statue of H. de Gorge, who early in the 19th century built the mining complex of Grand Hornu, which is an example of functional town-planning and evidence of the importance of the Industrial Revolution in Wallonia.

=== Second industrial power of the world ===
Jean-Pierre Rioux quoted the following table in his book La révolution industrielle (The Industrial Revolution) based on several "levels of development"; consumption of cotton in the rough state, of cast iron, cast steel, coal, and the development of the railway network. It was first drawn by Paul Bairoch, one of the most important post-1945 economists. This table is not based on absolute figures, nor does it point out absolute ranks, but the hierarchy of the industrial powers is based on their levels of development. "Wallonia" may be substituted for "Belgium".

Rank	1810	1840	1860	1880	1900	1910
1	United Kingdom	United Kingdom	United Kingdom	United Kingdom	United States	United States
2	Belgium	Belgium	Belgium	Belgium	United Kingdom	United Kingdom
3	United States	United States	United States	United States	Belgium	Belgium
4	France	Switzerland	Switzerland	Switzerland	Switzerland	Germany
5	Switzerland	France	France	Germany	Germany	Switzerland
6	Germany	Germany	Germany	France	France	France
7	Sweden	Sweden	Sweden	Sweden	Sweden	Sweden
8	Spain	Spain	Spain	Spain	Spain	Spain
9	Italy	Italy	Italy	Italy	Italy	Italy
10	Russia	Russia	Russia	Russia	Russia	Russia
11	Japan	Japan	Japan	Japan	Japan	Japan

According to Herbert Lüthy, quoted by Maurice Besnard said Belgium and its Walloon part was "the first country to become an industrial country after England". Herbert Lüthy did not agree with the theory of Max Weber on the link between capitalism and Protestantism and emphasised the fact that Wallonia was a Catholic country. Philippe Destatte wrote that Wallonia was "the second industrial power of the world, in proportion to its population and its territory".

Hervé Hasquin said, "the development of the Walloon industrial regions contributed to make Belgium one of the main industrial powers in Europe, if not in the world ..." Philippe Raxhon wrote that after 1830, "the Walloon regions were becoming the second industrial power in the world after England". Marc Reynebau said the same thing.

According to Michel De Coster, a professor at the University of Liège, "The historians and the economists say that Belgium was the second industrial power of the world, in proportion to its population and its territory ... [b]ut this rank is that of Wallonia, where were concentrated the coal-mines, the blast furnaces, the iron and zinc factories, the wool industry, the glass industry, the weapons industry ... " According to Wallonia Foreign Trade and Investment Agency, "The Walloon iron and steel industry came to be regarded as an example of the radical evolution of industrial expansion. Thanks to coal ... the region geared up to become the second industrial power in the world after England ... in 1833 Belgian industry boasted 5 times more steam machines per inhabitant than a country such as France. It also exported them to over 25 countries." European Route of Industrial Heritage said, "The sole industrial centre outside the collieries and blast furnaces of Walloon was the old cloth making town of Ghent".

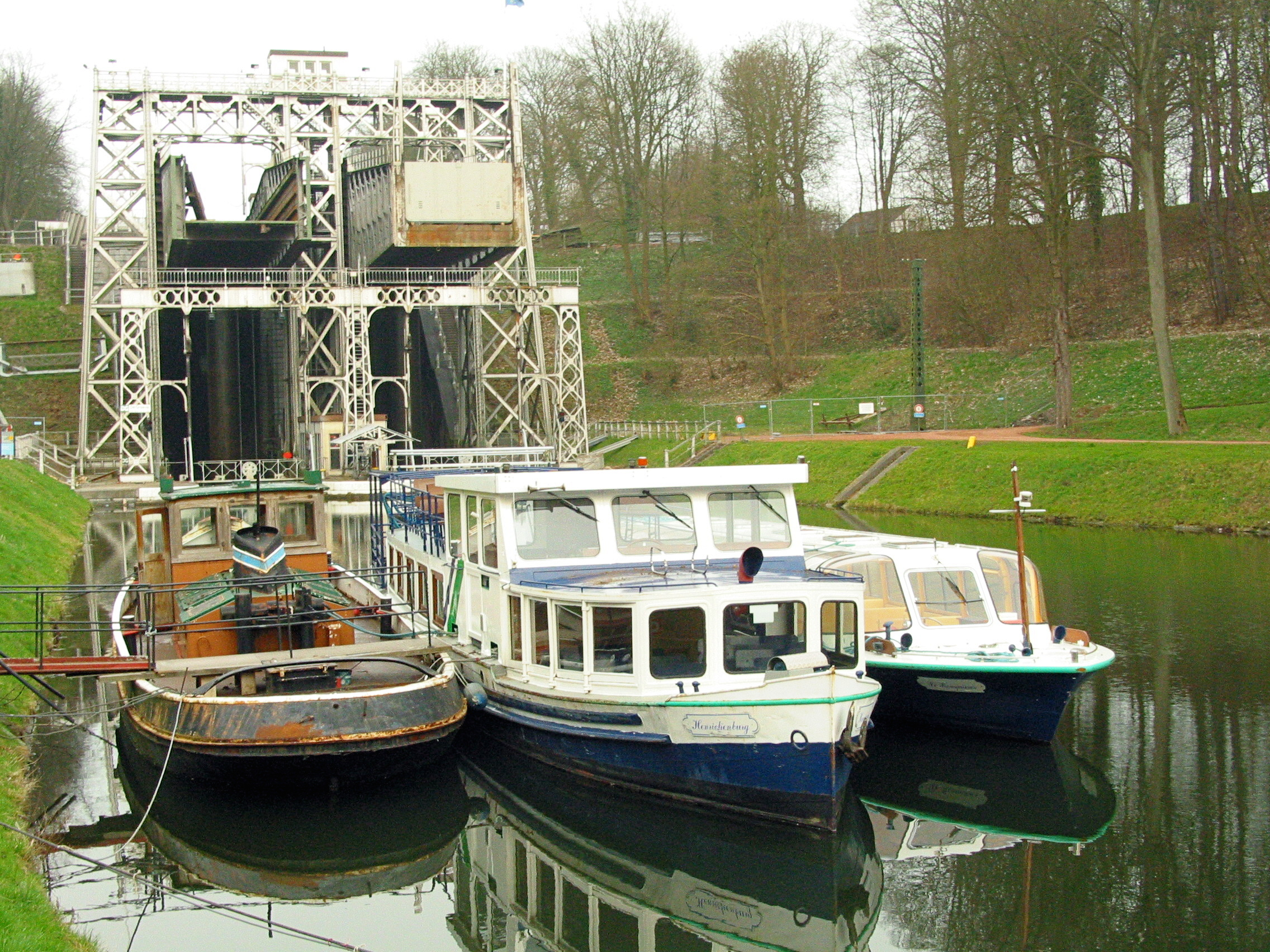
Lift no. 3, of four late-19th-century hydraulic boat lifts on the old Canal du Centre near the town of La Louvière, and a World Heritage Site.

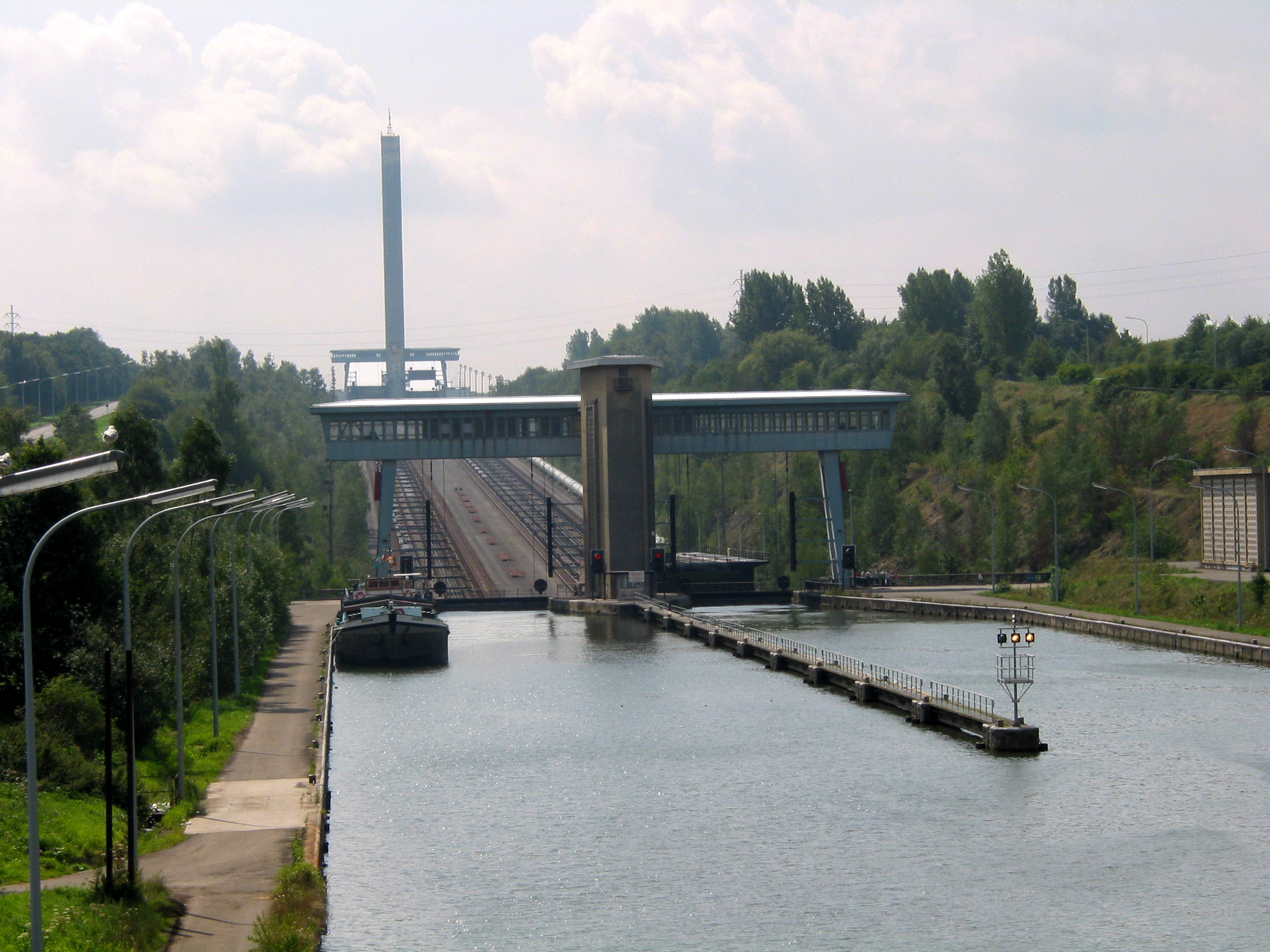
Ronquières inclined plane, second half of the 20th century

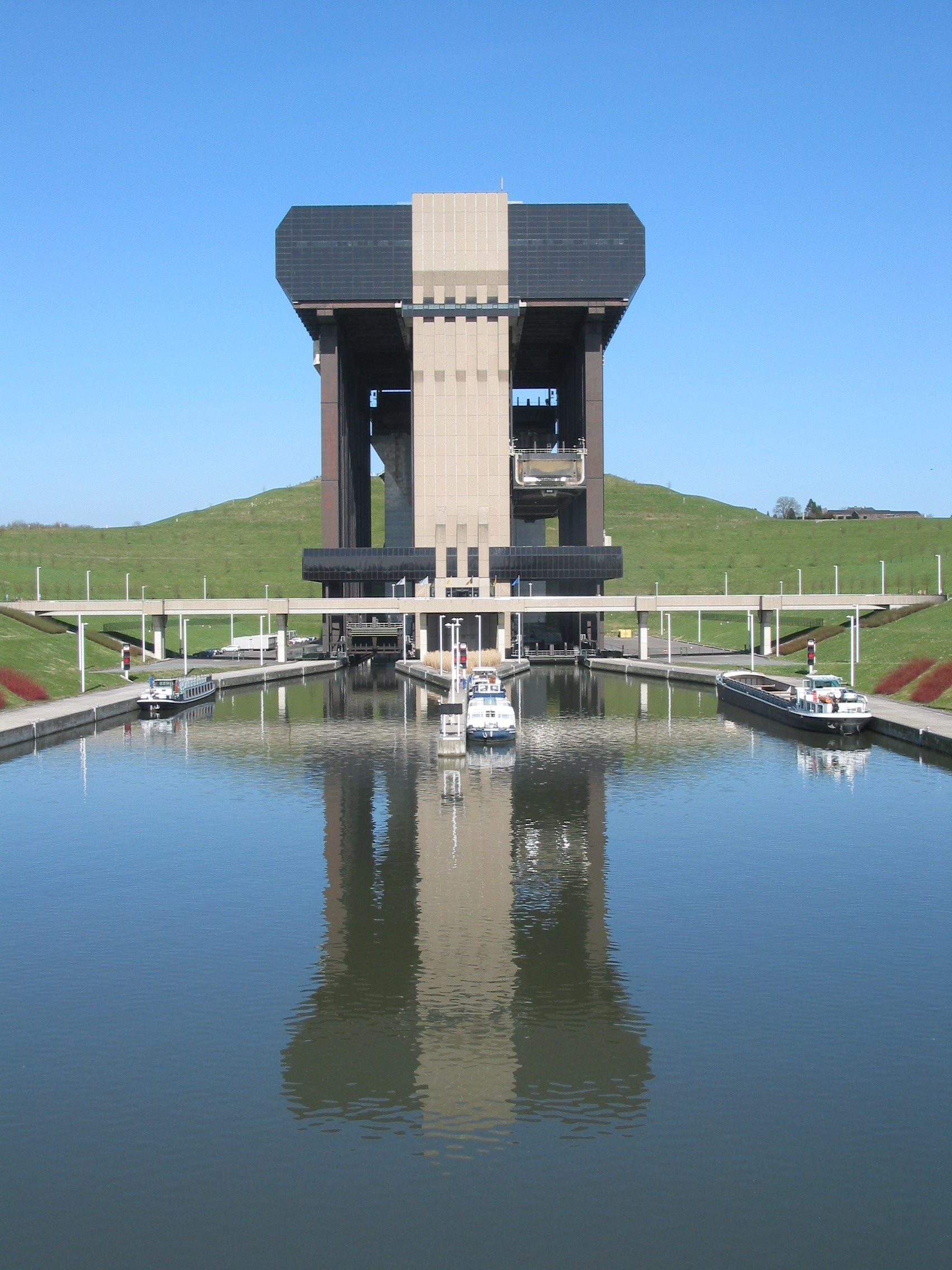
Strépy-Thieu boat lift. The modern boat lift, built at the beginning of the 21st century.

=== Dependence on Brussels ===
Michel Quévit wrote that Wallonia has been a prosperous country dependent on the financial powers in Brussels. When arriving at the end of the first stage of the industrial revolution, Walloon captains of industry took huge risks because of the large increase of their production. The result was that the Haute Banque in Brussels acquired very important financial participation in the Walloon companies, and in 1847 Brussels became the dominant centre of Belgian territory".

Herman Van der Wee said Wallonia's status as Belgium's industrial heartland was "due to factors on the supply side and to a fortuitous boom in exporting coal to France [and] to the export demand for pig iron, for intermediate finished metal products, for steam engines, locomotives and other transportation equipment [which was largely determined by] the Railway Revolution and the ensuing railway boom." He also said, " ... because ... Wallonia’s heavy industry had an undeniable technological lead over its French and German counterparts, and because it had a clear locational advantage vis-à-vis British competition, the first phase of industrialization in Germany and France became very dependent upon exports from Wallonia".

According to Van der Wee, "Antwerp's harbor benefited from the shift of Wallonia’s exports to the sea route and from the rising transit trade with Germany and France". At the end of the nineteenth century, the port began attracting industrial investment based on its advantageous location. The industrialisation of Antwerp and the diffusion of the mechanized textile industry from Ghent to the rest of Flanders was not enough to shift the balance of industrial power northwards, and this shift did not occur until after the Second World War. The Brussels mixed banks, the Société Générale de Belgique, founded in 1822, and the Banque de Belgique, founded in 1835, combined commercial banking with long-term investment and had a dominant role in Belgium's industrialisation.

After the Second World War, investment in colonial mining and transportation ceased and Belgium became a more affluent society. Industrial investment shifted towards consumer durables and traditional Brussels holding companies lost their grip on Belgian industry to American multinationals, German mixed banks and to other financially independent European companies. The need for external funds was increasing but the control of the new industrial sectors increasingly shifted into the hands of foreign investors.

=== Political dependence on the north ===
In 1930, the language of Belgium's elites, government, monarchy, and bourgeoisie, was French; they favoured the southern part of Belgium over the northern part. Francophone elites at the head of companies, industry and politics came from both Flanders and Wallonia. Wallonia found this to be a disadvantage. According to Philippe Destatte, "In the history of Belgium, the legislative elections held on 11 June 1884 represent a pivotal point, for the total victory of the Catholic Party over Walthère Frère-Orban's Liberals opened the way for thirty years of homogeneous governments, thirty years of domination by that party, whose main power was in Flanders. Above all, this 1884 victory had the effect—to quote Robert Demoulin—of shifting the country's political centre of gravity from the South to the North."

Government composition, 1884-1911
Periods and Governments	Flemish Ministers	Ministers from Brussels	Walloon Ministers
A. Beernaert : October 26, 1884/ March 17, 1894	60%	14%	26%
J. de Burlet : March 26, 1894/ June 25, 1896	75%	9%	16%
P. de Smet de Naeye : June 26, 1896/ January 23, 1899	87%	-	13%
J. Vandenpeereboom : January 24, 1899/ July 31, 1899	84%	-	16%
Paul de Smet de Naeyer : August 5, 1899/ April 12, 1907	76%	-	24%
J. de Trooz : May 1, 1907/ December 31, 1907	67%	11%	22%
F. Schollaert : January 9, 1908/ June 8, 1911	57%	22%	21%
Ch. de Broqueville : June 18, 1911/ August 4, 1914	42%	22%	36%

Jules Destrée, an important socialist leader of Charleroi, reacted against this situation by writing his Lettre au roi sur la séparation de la Wallonie et de la Flandre. The President of the POB, Emile Vandervelde, said, "The Walloon populations are tired of seeing themselves crushed by an artificial majority formed by the Flemish part of the country".

=== Industrial relations ===
According to Tony Cliff, Belgium has a tradition of general strikes. A series of strikes occurred in 1886, beginning in Charleroi then moving to Liege and into the Walloon provinces. The strikers demanded universal suffrage, and in some places there were economic demands. In May 1891, 125,000 workers struck to demand electoral reforms, and a similar strike occurred in April 1893, when 250,000 workers struck. Further strikes demanding electoral reform occurred in 1902 and 1913. In 1936, workers successfully struck to demand a forty-hour working week and paid holidays. A general strike in 1950 led to the abdication of King Leopold. Coal miners in the Borinage began a general strike in 1958-9 to demand the nationalisation of the mining industry and increased wages.

Belgium was dominated by a Francophone elite from Brussels, Flanders and Wallonia. Philippe Destatte wrote: "It is true that the Walloon movement, which has never stopped affirming that Wallonia is part of the French cultural area, has never made this cultural struggle a priority, being more concerned to struggle against its status as a political minority and the economic decline which was only a corollary to it." Jules Destrée fought against this situation; the Wallonian people were always a minority in Belgium, first dominated by the French-speaking elite and afterwards by the Dutch-speaking elite. André Renard became the leader of the 1960–61 Winter General Strike to demand a self-governing Wallonia.

=== Walloon decline versus reconversion ===
According to the website "Portal Wallonia", the effect of the two world wars was to curb economic growth in Wallonia. By 1958, the region's dwindling coal reserves were becoming increasingly expensive to extract and the factories were becoming outdated. Wallonia needed to redefine its role as Belgium's industrial heartland; it turned to the technology sector.

The December 1960 general strike succeeded only in Wallonia, where it became a Renardist strike. According to Renée Fox, a major reversal in the relationship between Flanders and Wallonia was underway. Flanders had entered a period of vigorous industrialization, and a significant percentage of the foreign capital entering Belgium to support new industries—particularly from the United States—was being invested in Flanders. In contrast, Wallonia's coal mines and outdated steel plants and factories were in crisis, and the region's unemployment was rising and investment capital was falling. According to Fox, an unpwardly mobile, Dutch-speaking, "populist bourgeoisie" was becoming visible and vocal in both Flemish movements and in local and national policy. The strike was originally against the austerity law of Gaston Eyskens, but became "a collective expression of the frustrations, anxieties, and grievances that Wallonia was experiencing in response to its altered situation, and by the demands [for] regional autonomy for Wallonia ... "

In 2012, four former industrial sites, the Major Mining Sites of Wallonia, were recognized by UNESCO as world heritage sites.

As of 2014, Wallonia displays interregional cooperation with its neighbours, centres of excellence and-state-of-the-art technologies and business parks. The Region is not yet at the level of Flanders, however, and is suffering many difficulties. Nevertheless, forty Walloon companies are number one in Wallonia and worldwide, according to the Union Wallonne des Entreprises, for instance in glass production, lime and limestone production, cyclotrons, and the aviation industry.

== Culture ==
The Manifesto for Walloon culture published in 1983 is also an important event in Walloon history.

== See also ==
- History of the Walloon Movement
- History of Belgium
- Renardism
- Huguenots

== Bibliography ==
- Ramon Arango, Leopold III and the Belgian Royal Question, The Johns Hopkins Press, Baltimore, 1961.
- Léopold Genicot (ed.), Histoire de la Wallonie, Privat, Toulouse, 1973.
- Hervé Hasquin (ed.), La Wallonie, le pays et les hommes. Histoire. Écomonie; Sociétés, Tome I and Tome II, La Renaissance du Livre, Brussels, 1975 and 1980.
- Rita Lejeune and Jacques Stiennon (eds.), La Wallonie, le Pays et les Hommes: Lettres – Arts – Culture, 4 vols, La Renaissance du Livre, Brussels, 1978–1981.
- Kenneth D. McRae, Conflict and Compromise in Multilingual Societies: Belgium, Wilfrid Laurier University Press (1 January 1986), ISBN 978-0-88920-195-8.
- Renée C. Fox, In the Belgian Château, Ivan R. Dee, Chicago, 1994, p. 13 ISBN 978-1-56663-057-3.
- Jan Velaers and Herman Van Goethem, Leopold III, de Koning, het Land, de Oorlog, Lannoo, Tielt, 1994, ISBN 978-90-209-2387-2.
- Philippe Destatte, L'identité wallonne, Institut Destrée, Charleroi, 1997. ISBN 978-2-87035-000-3.
- Carl Strikwerda, A House Divided: Catholics, Socialists, and Flemish Nationalists in Nineteenth-Century Belgium, Rowman & Littlefield, Laham, Oxford, 1997, p. 109, ISBN 978-0-8476-8526-4.
- Astrid Von Busekist,Politique des langues et construction de l'État, Éd. Duculot, Gembloux, 1998. ISBN 978-2-8011-1179-6.
- Louis Vos, Nationalism in Belgium, Macmillan Press, London, 1998, ISBN 978-0-333-65737-9, St. Martin's Press, New York, 1998, ISBN 978-0-312-21249-0.
- Alan S. Milward, The European Rescue of the Nation-State, Routledge, London, 2000, p. 41, ISBN 978-0-415-21628-9.
- Paul Delforge (ed.), Encyclopédie du Mouvement wallon, Tome I, II and III, Institut Destrée, Charleroi, 2000 and 2001.
- Robert Halleux, Cockerill, Deux siècles de technologie, Editions du Perron, Liège, 2002.
- Luc Courtois and Jean Pirottte, De fer et de feu, l'émigration walllonne vers la Suède, Fondation Humblet, Louvain-la-neuve, 2003.
- Bruno Demoulin and Jean-Louis Kupper (eds.), Histoire de la Wallonie de la préhistoire au XXIe siècle, Privat, Toulouse, 2004.
- Pierre Tilly, André Renard, Far et Le Cri, Brussels, Liège, 2005. ISBN 978-2-87106-378-0.
- Yves Quairiaux, L'image du Flamand en Wallonie, Labor, Brussels, 2006.
- Michel De Coster, Les enjeux des conflits linguistiques, L'Harmattan, Paris, 2007, ISBN 978-2-296-03394-8.
- Luc Courtois, Jean-Pierre Delville, Françoise Rosart and Guy Zélis (eds.), Images et paysages mentaux des xixe siècle et xxe siècle de la Wallonie à l'Outre-Mer - Hommage au professeur Jean Pirotte à l'occasion de son éméritat, Academia Bruylant, Presses Universitaires de l'UCL, Louvain-la-Neuve, 2007. ISBN 978-2-87416-014-1.
- Paul Delforge, La Wallonie et la première guerre mondiale. Pour une histoire de la séparation administrative, Institut Jules Destrée, Namur, 2009.
- Marnix Beyen and Philippe Destatte, Un autre Pays Le Cri, Brussels, 2009, ISBN 978-2-87106-502-9.
- Els Witte, Jan Craeybeckx, Alain Meynen, Political History of Belgium: From 1830 onwards, Academic and Scientific Publishers, Brussels, 2009, p. 240. ISBN 978-90-5487-517-8.
- Pascal Verbeken, La terre promise. Flamands en Wallonie, Le castor astral, Brussels, 2010.
- Michel Quévit, Flandre-Wallonie. Quelle solidarité? De la création de l'Etat belge à l'Europe des Régions, Charleroi, 2010. ISBN 978-2-87003-536-8.
