= Wallonie Libre =

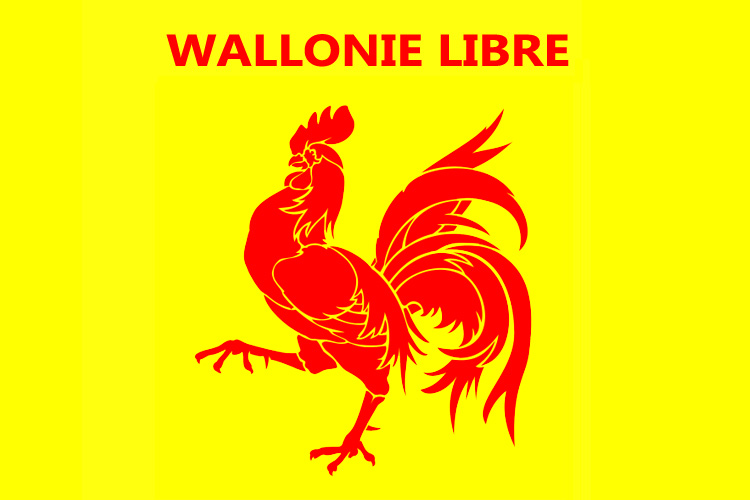
The banner of Wallonie Libre, based on the flag of Wallonia

Wallonie libre (French; literally "Free Wallonia") is a minor political party active in Wallonia in Belgium which originated as a group active within the resistance in German-occupied Belgium during World War II. Affiliated with the Walloon Movement, its ideology became increasingly radical in the post-war period.

== History ==
=== Resistance group, 1940–44 ===
Wallonie libre originated as a political association of Walloon migrants in Brussels known as the Walloon Guard (Garde wallonne) in the 1930s. It was heavily influenced by the radical Walloon Movement which supported the secession of Wallonia and its merger into France.

The group was re-formed in the aftermath of the Battle of Belgium (10–28 May 1940) to provide aid to the French which were still fighting Nazi Germany. Wallonie libre was purportedly established on 18 June 1940 during the Garde's annual gathering to commemorate the anniversary of the Battle of Waterloo which coincided with the radio broadcast of the Appeal of 18 June by the French General Charles de Gaulle. The name Wallonie libre was consciously chosen as a counterpart to de Gaulle's own France libre (Free France).

Wallonie libre is therefore sometimes credited as the earliest Belgian Resistance group. During the occupation, Wallonie libre produced an underground newspaper called La Wallonie Libre and another in Liège entitled Sambre et Meuse. Although broadly socialist and liberal in political orientation, it became close to parts of the Communist Party of Belgium in 1941. In August 1942, it was absorbed into the national left-wing faction Front de l'Indépendance (Independence Front).

=== Political party, 1944— ===
After the Liberation in 1944, Wallonie Libre became a political movement. It organised the Walloon National Congress, held on 20-1 October 1945. After a period of dormancy, it was revived during the resurgence of the Walloon Movement in 1960. It organised the so-called Combat Wallon (Walloon Combat), leading to the 1980 Congress where the movement began to call for complete Walloon independence. In 2005, Jacques Rogissart, the then-leader of Wallonie Libre decided to join the Rassemblement Wallonie-France ("Wallonia-France Rally"), led by Paul-Henry Gendebien. He created a counter-organization called Nouvelle Wallonie Libre ("New Free Wallonia"). He was replaced by Jacques Dupont.
