= Walloons =

Ethnic group native to Belgium

- Flag of Wallonia

Total population
- c. 3.5–4 million

Regions with significant populations
- Belgium: 3,240,000
- United States: Indeterminable^{[a]} (352,630 Belgians)
- Canada: 176,615^{[b]} (Belgians)
- France: 133,066

Languages
- Walloon French; Regional Langues d'oïl: (Walloon; Picard; Lorrain; Champenois); French Belgian Sign Language

Religion
- Roman Catholic majority, Protestant minority (see also Walloon church)

Related ethnic groups
- Other Romance, romanized Celtic and Germanic peoples: (French; Romands; Normans; Jèrriais; Dutch; Flemish; Germans; Luxembourgers)
- ^a U.S. population census does not differentiate between Belgians and Walloons, therefore the number of the latter is unknown.^b Canadian census does not differentiate between Belgians and Walloons, therefore the number of the latter is unknown and indeterminable. In 2011, 176,615 respondents stated Belgian ethnic origin; this figure definitely includes a substantial number of ethnic Flemings who may also identify as Belgian even though the census differentiates between the two. They may also be inclined to identify as French, of which there were as many as 7 million.

Walloons (/wɒˈluːnz/ WOL-oonz; French: Wallons [walɔ̃]; Walloon: Walons; Dutch: Walen) are a Gallo-Romance ethnic group native to the Wallonia region of Belgium. Walloons primarily speak langues d'oïl such as Belgian French, Picard and Walloon. Walloons are primarily Roman Catholic, with a historical minority of Protestantism which dates back to the Reformation era.

In modern Belgium, Walloons are, by law, termed a "distinctive linguistic and ethnic community" within the country, as are the neighbouring Flemish, a Dutch (Germanic) speaking community.

When understood as a regional identification, the ethnonym is also extended to refer to the inhabitants of the Walloon region in general, regardless of ethnicity or ancestry.

== Etymology ==
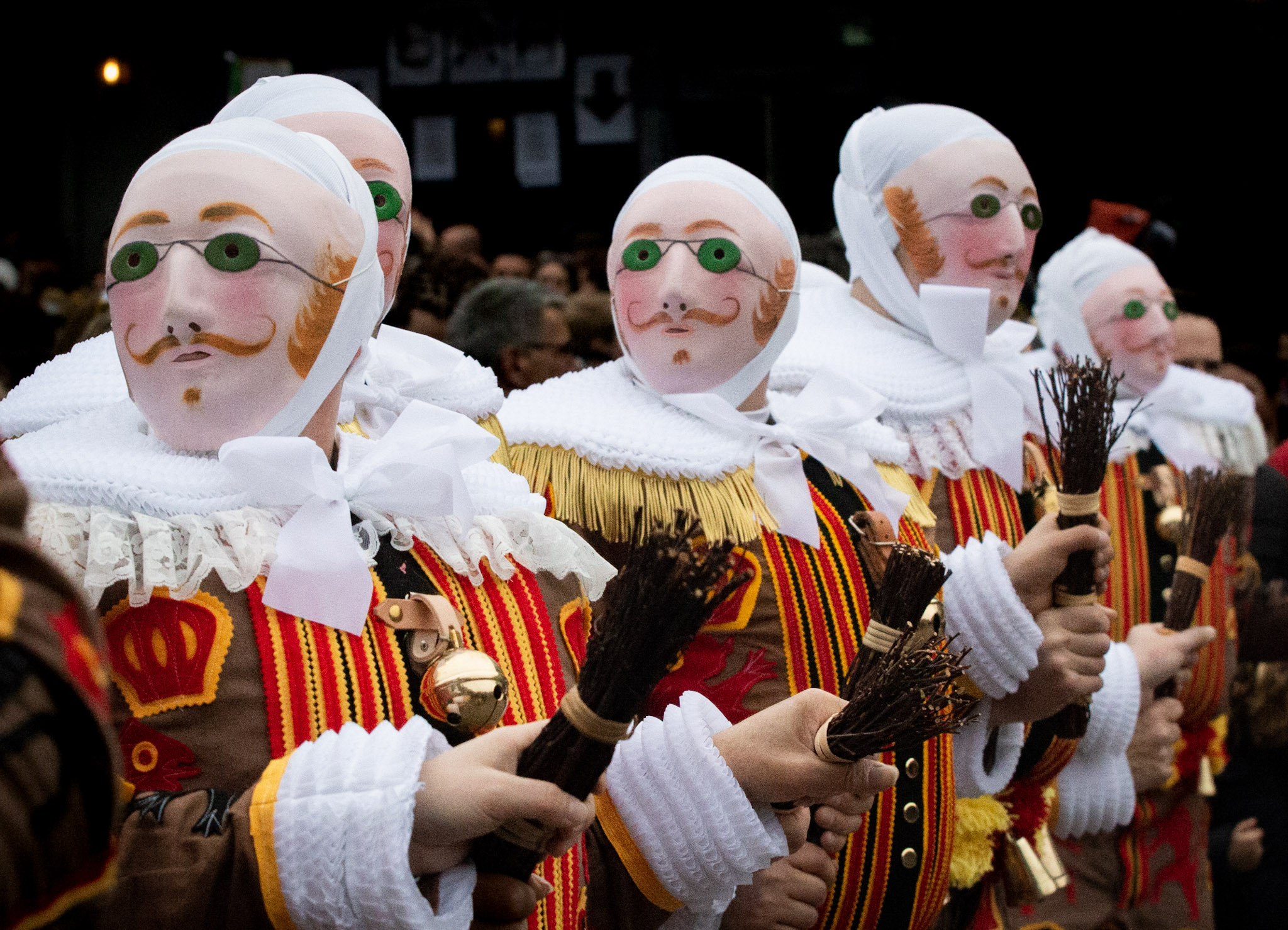
Walloons wearing Gilles masks in Binche

The term Walloon is derived from *walha, a Proto-Germanic term used to refer to Celtic and Latin speakers.

Walloon originated in Romance languages alongside other related terms, but it supplanted them. Its oldest written trace is found in Jean de Haynin's Mémoires de Jean, sire de Haynin et de Louvignies in 1465, where it refers to Roman populations of the Burgundian Netherlands. Its meaning narrowed yet again during the French and Dutch periods and, at Belgian independence, the term designated only Belgians speaking a Romance language (French, Walloon, Picard, etc.) The linguistic cleavage in the politics of Belgium adds a political content to "the emotional cultural, and linguistic concept". The words Walloon and Wallons can be seen in the book of Charles White, The Belgic Revolution (1835): "The restless Wallons, with that adventurous daring which is their historical characteristic, abandoned their occupations, and eagerly seizing the pike and the musket marched towards the centre of the commotion." The Spanish terms of Walon and Walona from the 17th century referred to a Royal Guard Corps recruited in the Spanish Flanders. They were involved in many of the most significant battles of the Spanish Empire.

Albert Henry wrote that although in 1988 the word Walloon evoked a constitutional reality, it originally referred to Roman populations of the Burgundian Netherlands and was also used to designate a territory by the terms provinces wallonnes or pays wallon (Walloon country), from the 16th century to the Belgian revolution, and later Wallonia. The term 'Walloon country' was also used in Dutch viz. Walsch land. The term existed also in German, perhaps Wulland in Hans Heyst's 1571 book, where that word is later (1814) translated to Wallonia in English. In German it is however generally Wallonenland. In English, it is Walloon country (see further James Shaw). In French it is le Pays wallon. For Félix Rousseau, Walloon country is, after le Roman pays the old name of the country of the Walloons.

=== Institutional aspects ===
The term "state reform" in the Belgian context indicates a process towards finding constitutional and legal solutions for the problems and tensions among the different segments of the Belgian population, mostly Dutch-speakers of Flanders and French-speakers of Wallonia. In general, Belgium evolved from a unitary state to a federal state with communities, regions and language areas.

== Conceptual aspects ==
=== Wallonia ===
Location of Wallonia in Belgium and Europe (dark green)

The area now known as Wallonia has been settled by various Celtic tribes and later by Roman and Frankish settlers. From the early Middle Ages up until the early modern period, the region has been separated between many city-states and external powers. Such changing rule brought variations to borders, culture, and language. The Walloon language, widespread in use up until the Second World War, has been dying out of common use due in part to its prohibition by the public school system, in favor of French.

Starting from the end of the 19th century, the Walloon Movement, aiming to assert the identity of Walloons as French-speaking (rather than Walloon speaking) people of Belgium. In this context, the concept of Wallonia, as a heartland of the Walloon people was invented in 1886.

Later, this was complicated by the federal structure given to Belgium, which splits Belgium into three communities with the privilege of using their own tongues in official correspondence, but also into three autonomous regions. The communities are: French community (though not Walloon, but sometimes controversially called Wallonia-Brussels), Flemish community (which uses Dutch), and German-speaking community. The division into political regions does not correspond with the communities: Flemish Region, Walloon Region (including the German community but generally called Wallonia), and the bilingual (French-Dutch) Brussels-Capital Region.

=== Brussels - not Walloon and mostly French-speaking ===
Many non-French-speaking observers (over)generalize Walloons as a term of convenience for all Belgian French-speakers (even those born and living in the Brussels-Capital Region). The mixing of the population over the centuries means that most families can trace ancestors on both sides of the linguistic divide. But, the fact that Brussels is around 85% French-speaking, but is located in Dutch-speaking Flanders, has led to friction between the regions and communities. The local dialect in Brussels, Brussels Vloms, is a Brabantic dialect, reflecting the Dutch heritage of the city.

Walloons are historically credited with pioneering the Industrial Revolution in Continental Europe in the early 19th century. In modern history, Brussels has been the major town or the capital of the region. Because of long Spanish and minor French rule, French became the sole official language. After a brief period with Dutch as the official language while the region was part of the United Kingdom of the Netherlands, the people reinstated French after achieving independence in 1830. The Walloon region, a major coal and steel-producing area, developed rapidly into the economic powerhouse of the country. Walloons (in fact French-speaking elites who were called Walloons) became politically dominant. Many Flemish immigrants came to work in Wallonia. Between the 1930s and the 1970s, the gradual decline of steel and more especially coal, coupled with too little investment in service industries and light industry (which came to predominate in Flanders), started to tip the balance in the other direction. Flanders became gradually politically and economically dominant. In their turn, Walloon families have moved to Flanders in search of jobs. This evolution has not been without political repercussions.

=== Walloon identity ===
The heartland of Walloon culture are the Meuse and Sambre river valleys, Charleroi, Dinant, Namur (the regional capital), Huy, Verviers, and Liège.

==== Regional language statistics ====
The Walloon language is an element of Walloon identity. However, the entire French-speaking population of Wallonia cannot be culturally considered Walloon, since a significant portion in the west (around Tournai and Mons) and smaller portions in the extreme south (around Arlon) possess other languages as mother tongues (namely, Picard, Champenois, Lorrain, Flemish, German and Luxembourgish).

A survey of the Centre liégeois d'étude de l'opinion pointed out in 1989 that 71.8% of the younger people of Wallonia understand and speak only a little or no Walloon language; 17.4% speak it well; and only 10.4% speak it exclusively. Based on other surveys and figures, Laurent Hendschel wrote in 1999 that between 30 and 40% people were bilingual in Wallonia (Walloon, Picard), among them 10% of the younger population (18–30 years old). According to Hendschel, 36 to 58% of young people had a passive knowledge of the regional languages. On the other hand, Givet commune, several villages in the Ardennes département in France, which publishes the journal Causons wallon (Let us speak Walloon); and two villages in Luxembourg are historically Walloon-speaking.

==== Walloons in the Renaissance ====
In 1572 Jean Bodin made a funny play on words which has been well known in Wallonia to the present:

Ouallonnes enim a Belgis appelamur [nous, les "Gaulois"], quod Gallis veteribus contigit, quuum orbem terrarum peragrarent, ac mutuo interrogantes qaererent où allons-nous, id est quonam profiscimur? ex eo credibile est Ouallones appellatos quod Latini sua lingua nunquam efferunt, sed g lettera utuntur.

Translation: "We are called Walloons by the Belgians because when the ancient people of Gallia were travelling the length and breadth of the earth, it happened that they asked each other: 'Où allons-nous?' [Where are we going? : the pronunciation of these French words is the same as the French word Wallons (plus 'us')], i.e. 'To which goal are we walking?.' It is probable they took from it the name Ouallons (Wallons), which the Latin speaking are not able to pronounce without changing the word by the use of the letter G." One of the best translations of his (humorous) sayings used daily in Wallonia is "These are strange times we are living in."

Shakespeare used the word Walloon: "A base Walloon, to win the Dauphin's grace/Thrust Talbot with a spear in the back." A note in Henry VI, Part I says, "At this time, the Walloons [were] the inhabitants of the area, now in south Belgium, still known as the 'Pays wallon'." Albert Henry agrees, quoting Maurice Piron, also quoted by A.J. Hoenselaars: "'Walloon' meaning 'Walloon country' in Shakespeare's 'Henry VI'..."

==== Walloons and the Enlightenment ====
A 1786 history of the Netherlands noted, "[The] Haynault and Namur, with Artois, now no longer an Austrian Province, compose the Walloon country. The Walloon name and language are also extended into the adjacent districts of the neighbouring Provinces. A large part of Brabant, where that Province borders on Haynault and Namur, is named Walloon Brabant. The affinity of language seems also on some occasions to have wrought a nearer relation."

==== The Belgian revolution of 1830 ====
The Belgian revolution was recently described as firstly a conflict between the Brussels municipality which was secondly disseminated in the rest of the country, "particularly in the Walloon provinces". We read the nearly same opinion in Edmundson's book:

The royal forces, on the morning of September 23, entered the city at three gates and advanced as far as the Park. But beyond that point they were unable to proceed, so desperate was the resistance, and such the hail of bullets that met them from barricades and from the windows and roofs of the houses. For three days almost without cessation the fierce contest went on, the troops losing ground rather than gaining it. On the evening of the 26th the prince gave orders to retreat, his troops having suffered severely. The effect of this withdrawal was to convert a street insurrection into a national revolt. The moderates now united with the liberals, and a Provisional Government was formed, having amongst its members Charles Rogier, Van de Weyer, Gendebien, Emmanuel van der Linden d'Hooghvorst, Félix de Mérode and Louis de Potter, who a few days later returned triumphantly from banishment. The Provisional Government issued a series of decrees declaring Belgium independent, releasing the Belgian soldiers from their allegiance, and calling upon them to abandon the Dutch standard. They were obeyed. The revolt, which had been confined mainly to the Walloon districts, now spread rapidly over Flanders.

Jacques Logie wrote: "On the 6th October, the whole Wallonia was under the Provisional Government's control. In the Flemish part of the country the collapse of the Royal Government was as total and quick as in Wallonia, except Ghent and Antwerp." Robert Demoulin, who was professor at the University of Liège, wrote: "Liège is in the forefront of the battle for liberty", more than Brussels but with Brussels. He wrote the same thing for Leuven. According to Demoulin, these three cities are the républiques municipales at the head of the Belgian revolution. In this chapter VI of his book, Le soulèvement national (pp. 93–117), before writing "On the 6th October, the whole Wallonia is free", he quotes the following municipalities from which volunteers were going to Brussels, the "centre of the commotion", in order to take part in the battle against the Dutch troops: Tournai, Namur, Wavre (p. 105) Braine-l'Alleud, Genappe, Jodoigne, Perwez, Rebecq, Grez-Doiceau, Limelette, Nivelles (p. 106), Charleroi (and its region), Gosselies, Lodelinsart (p. 107), Soignies, Leuze, Thuin, Jemappes (p. 108), Dour, Saint-Ghislain, Pâturages (p. 109) and he concluded: "So, from the Walloon little towns and countryside, people came to the capital.." The Dutch fortresses were liberated in Ath ( 27 September), Mons (29 September), Tournai (2 October), Namur (4 October) (with the help of people coming from Andenne, Fosses, Gembloux), Charleroi (5 October) (with people who came in their thousands).The same day that was also the case for Philippeville, Mariembourg, Dinant, Bouillon. In Flanders, the Dutch troops capitulated at the same time in Bruges, Ypres, Ostend, Menen, Oudenaarde, Geeraardsbergen (pp. 113–114), but nor in Ghent nor in Antwerp (only liberated on 17 October and 27 October). Against these interpretation, in any case for the troubles in Brussels, John W. Rooney Jr wrote:

It is clear from the quantitative analysis that an overwhelming majority of revolutionaries were domiciled in Brussels or in the nearby suburbs and that the aid came from outside was minimal. For example, for the day of 23 September, 88% of dead and wounded lived in Brussels identified and if we add those residing in Brabant, it reached 95%. It is true that if you look at the birthplace of revolutionary given by the census, the number of Brussels falls to less than 60%, which could suggest that there was support "national" (to different provinces Belgian), or outside the city, more than 40%. But it is nothing, we know that between 1800 and 1830 the population of the capital grew by 75,000 to 103,000, this growth is due to the designation in 1815 in Brussels as a second capital of the Kingdom of the Netherlands and the rural exodus that accompanied the Industrial Revolution. It is therefore normal that a large part of the population of Brussels be originating provinces. These migrants came mainly from Flanders, which was hit hard by the crisis in the textile 1826-1830. This interpretation is also nationalist against the statements of witnesses: Charles Rogier said that there were neither in 1830 nor nation Belgian national sentiment within the population. The revolutionary Jean-Baptiste Nothomb ensures that "the feeling of national unity is born today." As for Joseph Lebeau, he said that "patriotism Belgian is the son of the revolution of 1830.." Only in the following years as bourgeois revolutionary will "legitimize ideological state power.

==== In the Belgian State ====
A few years after the Belgian revolution in 1830, the historian Louis Dewez underlined that "Belgium is shared into two people, Walloons and Flemings. The former are speaking French, the latter are speaking Flemish. The border is clear (...) The provinces which are back the Walloon line, i.e.: the Province of Liège, the Brabant wallon, the Province of Namur, the Province of Hainaut are Walloon [...] And the other provinces throughout the line [...] are Flemish. It is not an arbitrarian division or an imagined combination in order to support an opinion or create a system: it is a fact..." Jules Michelet traveled in Wallonia in 1840 and mentions many times in his History of France his interest for Wallonia and the Walloons (this page on the Culture of Wallonia), 476 (1851 edition published online)

==== Relationship with the German-speaking community ====
The Walloon Region institutionally comprises also the German-speaking community of Belgium around Eupen, in the east of the region, next to Germany which ceded the area to Belgium after the First World War. Many of the 60,000 or so inhabitants of this very small community reject being considered as Walloon and – with their community executive leader Karl-Heinz Lambertz want to remain a federating unit, and to have all the powers of the Belgian Regions and Communities. Even if they do not want them absolutely and immediately (10 July 2008, official speech for the Flanders' national holiday).

=== Walloon diaspora ===
- Département des Ardennes
- Quebec and other parts of Canada
- United Kingdom
- South Africa
- Wisconsin: it is estimated that between 5,000 and 7,500 Brabantines and Hesbignons immigrated to the New World from 1852 to 1856. Algoma, Brussels, Casco, Forestville, Green Bay, Kewaunee, Luxemburg, Namur, Sturgeon Bay (Françoise L'Empereur found 700 Walloon family names in the phone books of these towns). The Walloon population of the Door Peninsula have historically spoken a distinctive dialect of Walloon known as Wisconsin Walloon or "Belgian".
- Sweden
- Italy

==== Walloons in Germany ====
Since the 11th century, the great towns along the river Meuse, for example, Dinant, Huy, and Liège, traded with Germany, where Wallengassen (Walloons' neighborhoods) were founded in certain cities. In Cologne, the Walloons were the most important foreign community, as noted by three roads named Walloonstreet in the city. The Walloons traded for materials they lacked, such as copper, found in Germany, especially at Goslar. New Walloon immigrants settled in several cities in the late 17th century, including Magdeburg and Cottbus.

==== Walloons in Poland ====
Walloons were one of the first foreign immigrant groups in Poland, with Walloons settling in Wrocław probably since the 12th century, however, the first written mention of Walloon immigrants in Wrocław comes from c. 1270. In the 12th century, Walloon brothers Aleksander and Walter from Malonne served as Catholic bishops of Płock and Wrocław in Poland, respectively, and there is a possibility that it was Bishop Walter who brought the first Walloon settlers to Poland. In the early 13th century Duke Henry the Bearded invited further Walloon immigrants to the area of Oława and Wierzbno to the south of Wrocław, and some descendants of Walloons from Wrocław also moved to Oława, Wierzbno, and Kraków. The guild of Walloon clothiers in Wrocław ceased to exist after 1422.

==== Walloons in Transylvania ====
In the 13th century, the medieval German colonization of Transylvania, then part of the Kingdom of Hungary, now central and north-western Romania, also included numerous Walloons. Place names such as Wallendorf (Walloon Village) and family names such as Valendorfean (Wallon peasant) can be found among the Romanian citizens of Transylvania.

==== Walloons in Sweden ====
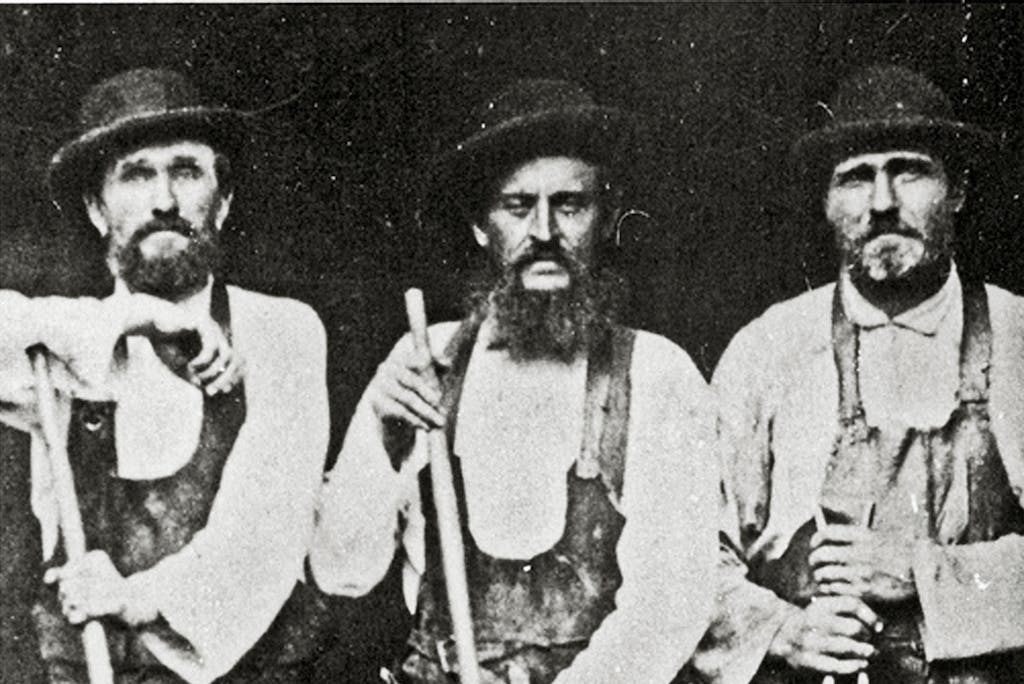
Walloon hammersmiths at Lövstabruk, early 1870s

Starting from the 1620s, numerous Walloon miners and iron-workers, with their families, settled in Sweden to work in iron mining and refining. Walloon methods of iron production were incorporated into Swedish practice, to supplement the existing German techniques. Many Walloon workers settled around the mine at Dannemora producing Öregrund iron which represented 15 per cent of Sweden's iron production at that time.

They were originally led by the entrepreneur Louis de Geer, who commissioned them to work in the iron mines of Uppland and Östergötland. The wave of migration continued substantially into the 18th century. Walloon ancestry is traceable through Walloon surnames. Some people of Walloon descent belong to the Sällskapet Vallonättlingar (Society of Walloon Descendants).

==== Walloons in Finland ====
During the 17th century Walloons from Sweden started arriving in Finland, during which Finland was part of Sweden. Some also came directly from Wallonia. Most of them settled along the coast in ironworks. Many of the ironworks in Finland were established by Walloons. Walloons largely used the same methods as in Sweden, although Walloon forging was not used, instead Walloon smiths used the German method. As in Sweden, the Walloon population in Finland eventually integrated to the wider society. Former Finnish prime minister Paavo Lipponen is of Walloon descent.

=== Walloon culture ===
The Manifesto for Walloon culture in 1983 was a major event of the History of Wallonia quoted in the important books about the region's history.

== Famous Walloons ==
This list includes people from the region before it became known as Wallonia.

=== Business ===
- Édouard Empain, (1852–1929), a wealthy engineer and entrepreneur; built the Paris Métro
- Louis De Geer, (1587–1652) merchant, industrialist and slave trader
- Georges Nagelmackers (1845–1905), founder of Compagnie des wagons lits
- Ernest Solvay (1838–1922), invented the Solvay process and founded the Solvay Business School

=== Literature ===
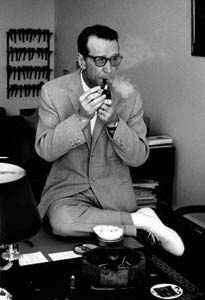
Georges Simenon, 1963

- Raoul Cauvin (1938-2021), comics author
- Nicolas Defrêcheux (1825–1874), poet in the Walloon language
- Jean Lemaire de Belges (ca.1473 – ca.1525), early Renaissance poet and historian.
- Henri Michaux (1899–1984), poet, writer, and painter
- Charles Plisnier (1896–1952), Prix Goncourt (1937)
- Édouard Remouchamps (1836–1900),(in the French Wiki) playwright in the Walloon language
- Georges Simenon (1903–1989), author of Maigret and other novels

=== Music ===
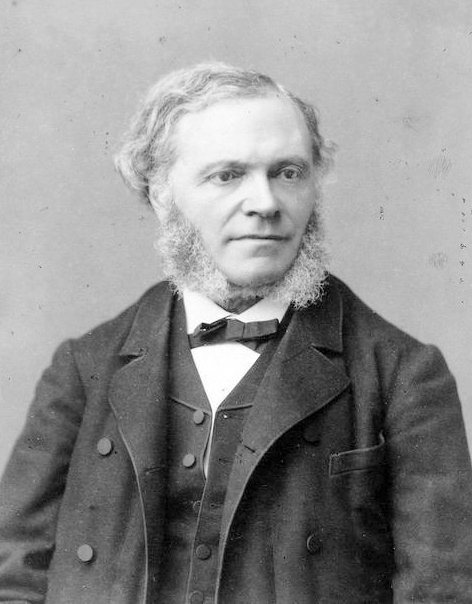
César Franck

- Gilles Binchois (c. 1400–1460), Franco-Flemish composer.
- Johannes Ciconia (ca.1370–1412), Ars nova composer
- Alice D'Hermanoy, (1885 — after 1932), soprano with the Chicago Civic Opera in the 1920s
- Guillaume Dufay, (ca.1397 – 1474) Franco-Flemish composer
- César Franck, (1822–1890) a Romantic composer, pianist and organist.
- André Grétry (ca.1741–1813), composer.
- Jean-Noël Hamal (1709 – 1778), Baroque composer.
- Pierre Lacocque, (born 1952) harmonica player for American blues band Mississippi Heat
- Orlande de Lassus (ca.1531 – 1594), Franco-Flemish composer
- Henri Pousseur (1929–2009), composer
- Pierre de la Rue (ca.1452 – 1518), Franco-Flemish composer
- Adolphe Sax (1814–1894), inventor of the saxophone.

=== Politics and military ===
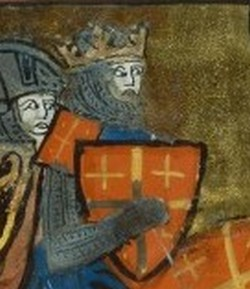
Godfrey of Bouillon, 1330

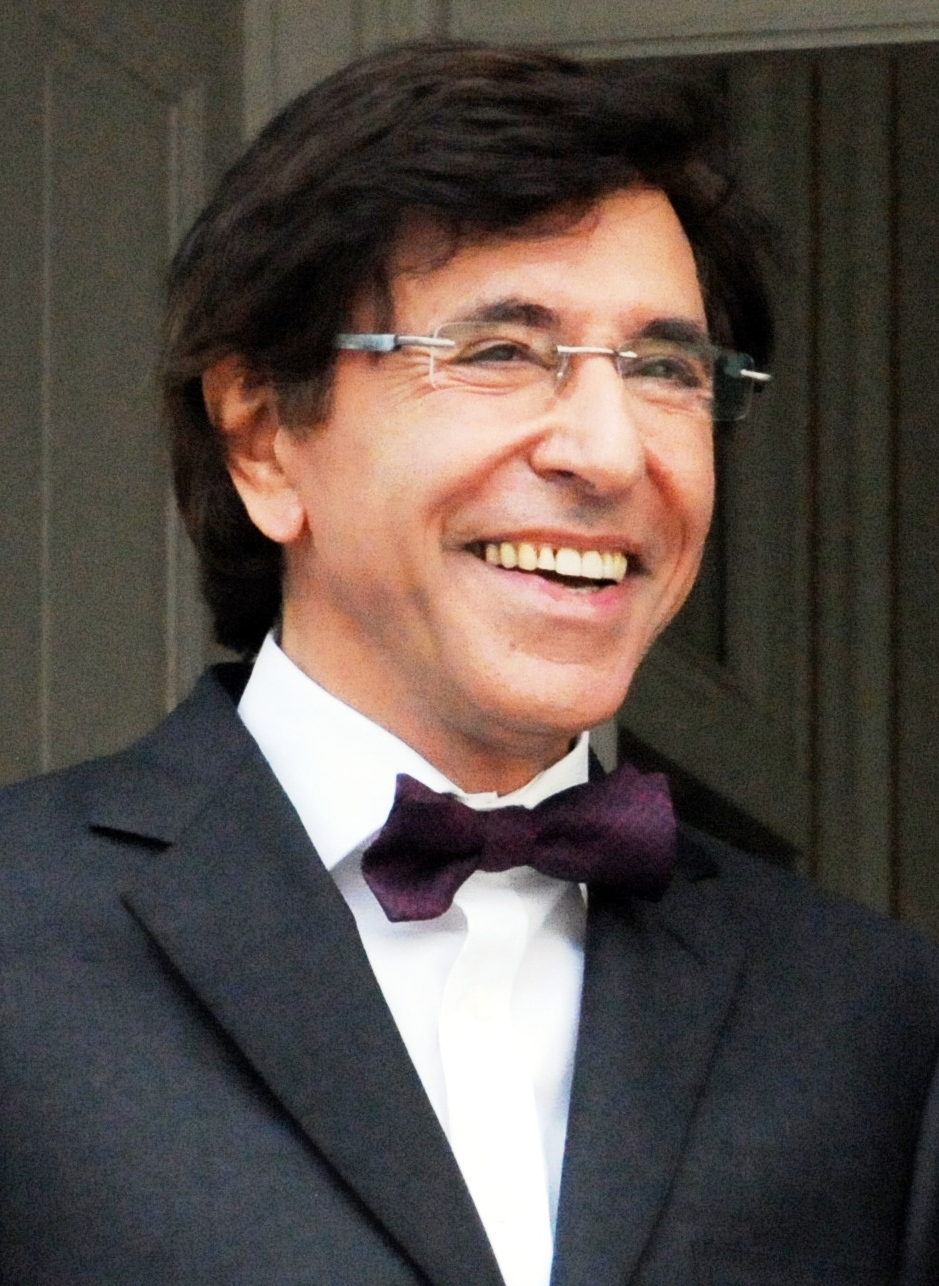
Elio Di Rupo, 2012

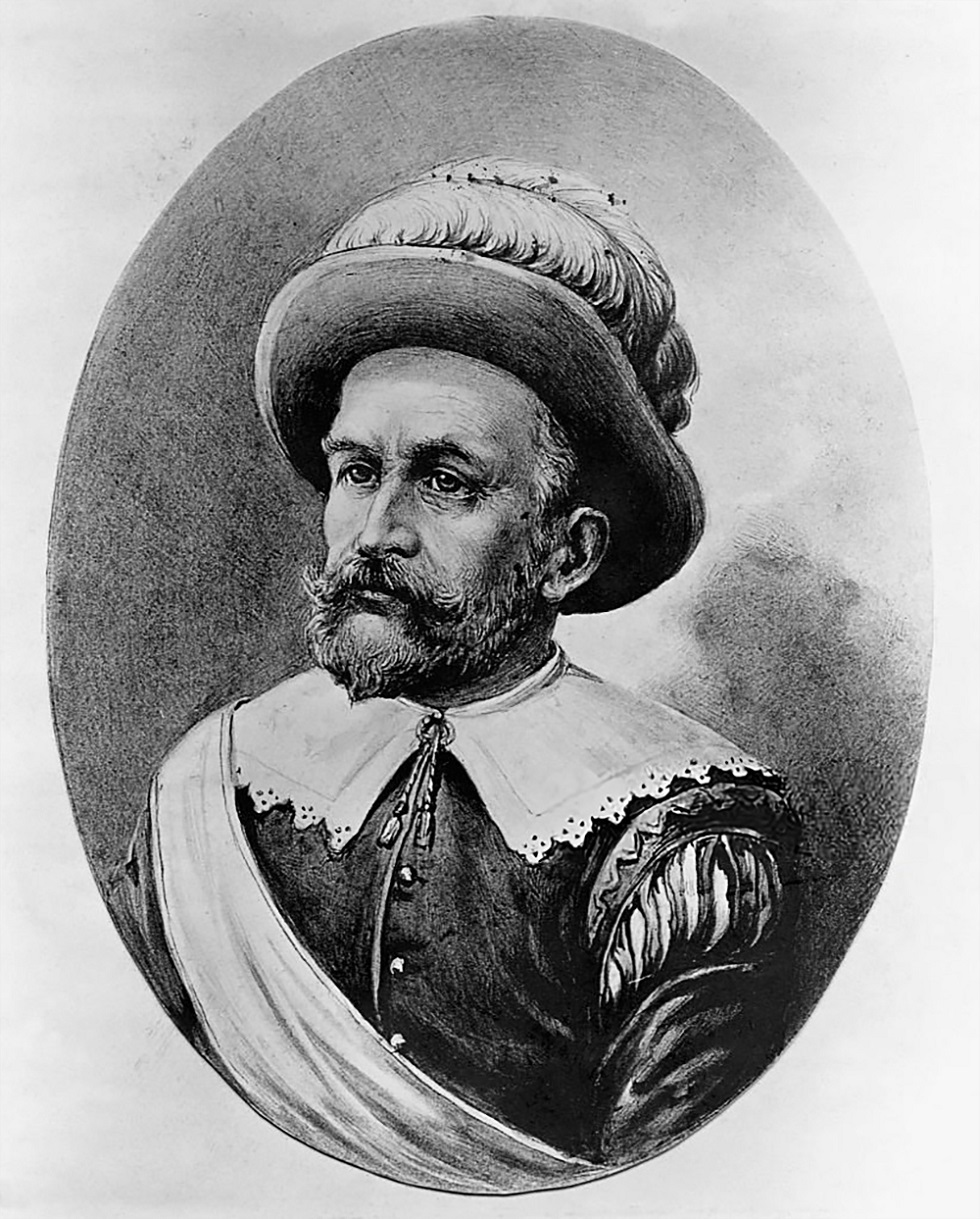
Peter Minuit

- Godfroid de Bouillon (ca.1060–1100), leader of the First Crusade and first European King of Jerusalem.
- François Sébastien Charles Joseph de Croix, Count of Clerfayt (1733–1798) Walloon Habsburg soldier in the Seven Years' War.
- Léon Degrelle (1906–1994), Belgian Rexist politician, leader of Waffen SS Walloon contingent
- Elio Di Rupo, (born 1951) the first Belgian Prime Minister of non-Belgian descent
- Jessé de Forest, (1576–1624) Walloon settler, colonised New Netherland and New York City
- Charles Michel (born 1975), prime minister of Belgium (2014–2019) and president of the European Council since 2019
- Pierre Minuit (1580–1638), purchased the island of Manhattan from the Native Americans for 60 guilders and founded what would become New York City
- André Renard (1911–1962), syndicalist, leader of the longest general strike in Belgium
- Jean Rey (1902–1983), second President of the European Commission
- Johann Tserclaes, Count of Tilly (1559–1632), Catholic League commander in the Thirty Years' War.

=== Religion ===
- Michael Baius (1513–1589), theologian of the Baianism.
- Louis Hennepin (1626–1704), Franciscan Recollet order missionary and US explorer.
- Juliana of Liège (ca.1192 – 1258), promoter of feast Corpus Christi
- Dominique Pire (1910–1969), recipient of the Nobel Peace Prize (1958)

=== Science and technology ===
- Zénon Bacq (1903–1983), inventor
- Jules Bordet (1870–1961), recipient of the Nobel Prize in Physiology or Medicine (1919)
- Zénobe Gramme (1826–1901), inventor of the Gramme machine
- Marc Lacroix (born 1952), biochemist and cancer researcher
- Georges Lemaître (1894–1966), originator of the "Big Bang" theory of the origin of the universe
- Dieudonné Saive (1888–1970), small arms engineer, designer of the FN FAL rifle
- Rennequin Sualem (1645–1708), hydraulics engineer
- Ernest Vervier, small arms engineer, designer of the FN MAG and FN Minimi machine guns, co-designer of the FN FAL rifle

=== Sport ===
- Philippe Gilbert (born 1982), professional cyclist
- Eden Hazard (born 1991), footballer
- Justine Henin (born 1982), tennis champion
- Michel Preud'homme (born 1959), footballer
- Jean-Michel Saive (born 1969), table tennis champion

=== Visual arts ===
- Robert Campin (c. 1375 – c. 1444), painter
- Dardenne brothers, Jean-Pierre Dardenne (born 1951), Luc Dardenne (born 1954)
- Jacques Daret (c. 1404 – c. 1470), Flemish painter
- Paul Delvaux, (1897–1994) a Belgian surrealist painter
- Louis Dewis, (1872–1946) pseudonym for the Post-Impressionist painter Louis Dewachter,
- Louis Gallait (1810–1887) a Belgian painter.
- René Magritte (1898–1967), Surrealist artist
- Joachim Patinir (1480–1524), Mosan painter
- Félicien Rops (1833–1898), painter.
- Michaelina Wautier (c. 1614 – c. 1689), painter
- Rogier van der Weyden (1399 or 1400–1464) or Roger de la Pasture, painter
- Thierry Zéno (1950–2017), filmmaker

=== Other ===
- Philip Delano (1603–1681/82), early American colonist and progenitor of the Delano family

== See also ==
- Belgians
- Flemish people
- Walloon church
