= Joseph Chot =

Belgian author and educator

Joseph Chot (1871–1952) was a Belgian author and educator, particularly known for gathering testimony of German atrocities during the First World War in Belgium. He was also active in the Walloon Movement.

== Life ==
Chot was born in Virton on 2 July 1871 and educated at the state secondary school in Tongeren. He studied history at the University of Liège, obtaining a doctorate in 1894.

He taught history at state secondary schools in Tienen (1899–1904) and Thuin (1904–1908) before briefly serving in the ministry of Science and Arts (1908–1912). He went on to teach at state secondary schools in Ixelles and Brussels until appointed an inspector of middle schools in 1920.

Throughout his adult life, Chot wrote for numerous French-language Belgian reviews and periodicals, and published several books, both fiction and non-fiction, including school textbooks in history and geography. He was a promoter of a distinctively Walloon cultural and historical identity. Besides writing and teaching, he was also involved in inventorising art and monuments for the heritage committee of the Province of Namur (Commission du Patrimoine artistique de la province de Namur).

He died at Olloy-sur-Viroin on 1 December 1952.

== Works ==
=== Non-fiction ===
- Histoire littéraire de l'abbaye de Saint-Trond de son origine au XIIIe siècle (1899)
- L'Évolution de l'art littéraire français en Belgique (1902)
- Histoire de la Renaissance artistique en Italie (1903)
- Histoire des villes de l'Italie du Nord au moyen-âge (1904)
- with René Dethier, Histoire des lettres françaises en Belgique (1910)
- Pendant la tourmente (1918)
- Dinant cité martyre (1919)
- Furie allemande dans l’Entre Sambre-et-Meuse (1919)
- Scaldes et vikings d'Islande (1937)
- De la défaite à la victoire (1949)

=== Fiction ===
- Légendes et nouvelles de l'Entre-Sambre-&-Meuse (1897)
- Cunroth le Scandinave (1900)
- Carcassou (1903)
- Le Génie d'Athènes (1908)
- Monsieur le Professeur (1909)
- Têtes dures de chez moi (1923)
- Un gai Luron (1928)
- Le berger des loups (1928)
- Fagnolle, 1554-1555 (1930)
