= André Renard =

Belgian trade unionist (1911–1962)

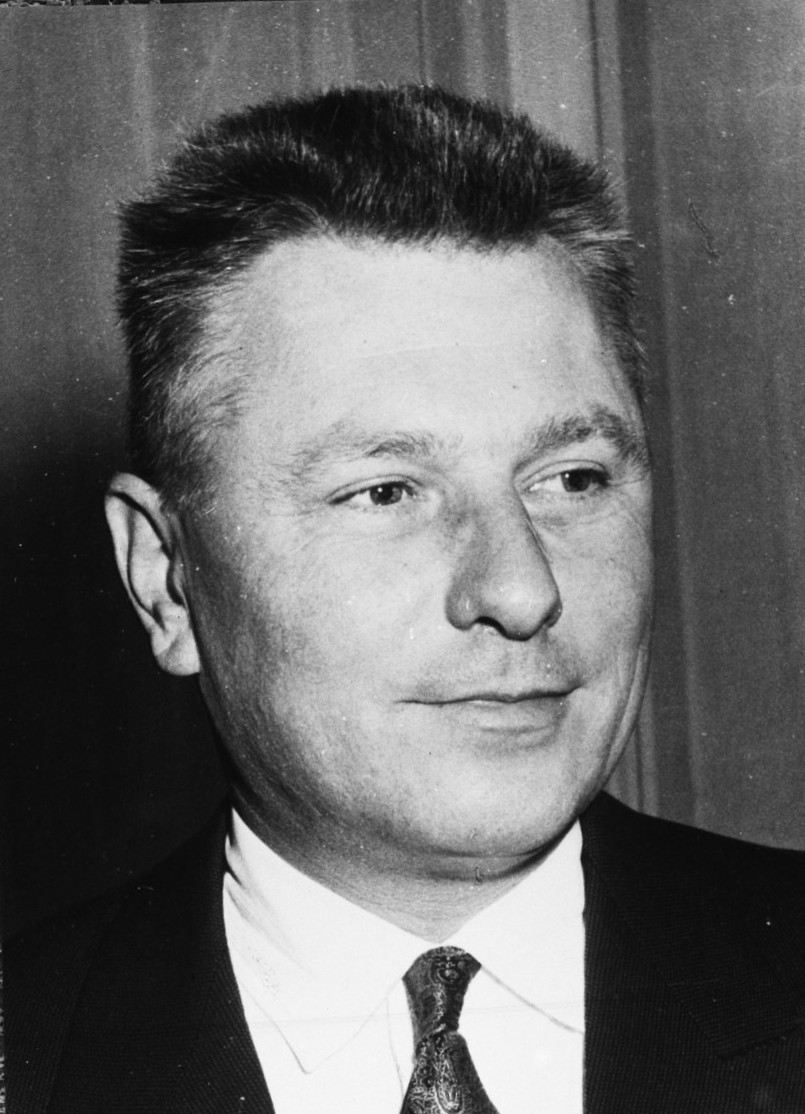
- Renard, pictured in 1961

Deputy General Secretary of the General Labour Federation of Belgium
- In office 1952–1961

Personal details
- Born: 25 May 1911 Valenciennes, Nord-Pas-de-Calais, France
- Died: 20 July 1962 (aged 51) Seraing, Liège Province, Belgium
- Spouse: Renée Lurquin (m. 1942)
- Known for: Renardism

André Renard (French pronunciation: [ɑ̃dʁe ʁənaʁ]; 25 May 1911 – 20 July 1962) was a Belgian trade union leader who, in the aftermath of World War II, became an influential figure within the Walloon Movement.

Born into a working-class family, Renard was as a metalworker in the Liège region in Wallonia in the era of the Great Depression before becoming involved in the Federation of Metalworkers of Liège (Fédération des métallurgistes de Liège) in 1937. He established an underground trade union in German-occupied Belgium during the Second World War which sought to unite socialist and communist unions within a united trade union (syndicat unique). He emerged as a powerful figure within trade unionism in the aftermath of the Liberation of Belgium.

Renard entered the newly established General Labour Federation of Belgium (Fédération Générale du Travail de Belgique, FGTB) in 1945 and emerged as a political figure with a national reputation in following years. He became increasingly interested in federalism at the time of the Royal Question in 1950 in which he was a vocal critic of the return of King Leopold III. He was prevented from becoming secretary-general of the FGTB in 1952 but was able to take the deputy secretary-general role with responsibility for Wallonia. The acrimonious failed general strike of 1960–1961 revealed the split between Walloon and Flemish aspirations and led to Renard's resignation in 1961.

Renard's political thinking, which became termed "Renardism" after his death, reflected the belief that left-wing political groups in Belgium should embrace federalism as a means to achieve radical social reform in a way not possible in a unitary state. After his resignation, Renard founded the Walloon Popular Movement (Mouvement Populaire Wallon, MPW) but died prematurely in July 1962. His ideals remained influential within the Walloon Movement after his death.

== Biography ==
=== Early life, 1911–1944 ===
André Gilles Guillaume Renard was born into a working-class family in Valenciennes in France on 25 May 1911. His parents were Belgian and he grew up in the industrial region around Liège in Wallonia in eastern Belgium. He began working at the steelworks of SA John Cockerill in Seraing in 1927 and soon moved to the Société métallurgique d'Espérance-Longdoz but was fired in 1935 in the midst of the Great Depression. Although re-hired at Cockerill, he participated in the general strike of 1936. He had taken evening classes in his spare time and was able to begin a career within the Federation of Metalworkers of Liège (Fédération des métallurgistes de Liège) in 1937. In trade union circles, he acquired a reputation as a leading figure among younger radical leaders.

Renard was mobilised into the Belgian Army at the start of the Second World War. He participated in the 18 Days' Campaign in May 1940 and spent two years as a prisoners of war in Nazi Germany. He was allowed to return to German-occupied Belgium in 1942 and made contact with the resistance group Army of Liberation (Armée de la libération, AL). He became involved in resistance activities himself and was involved in the attempt to form an underground trades union called the Unified Syndical Movement (Mouvement syndical unifié, MSU) which was intended to unite workers of all political persuasions in opposition to the officially-sanctioned Union of Manual and Intellectual Workers (Union des travailleurs manuels et intellectuels, UTMI) established with an explicitly corporatist objective. He married Renée Lurquin on 10 September 1942.

It was during the latter stages of the occupation that Renard first consolidated his ideas on trade unionism that would become known as Renardism. He published a collection of political essays entitled Pour la révolution constructive (1944) shortly after the Liberation of Belgium.

=== Syndicalist leader, 1944–1961 ===
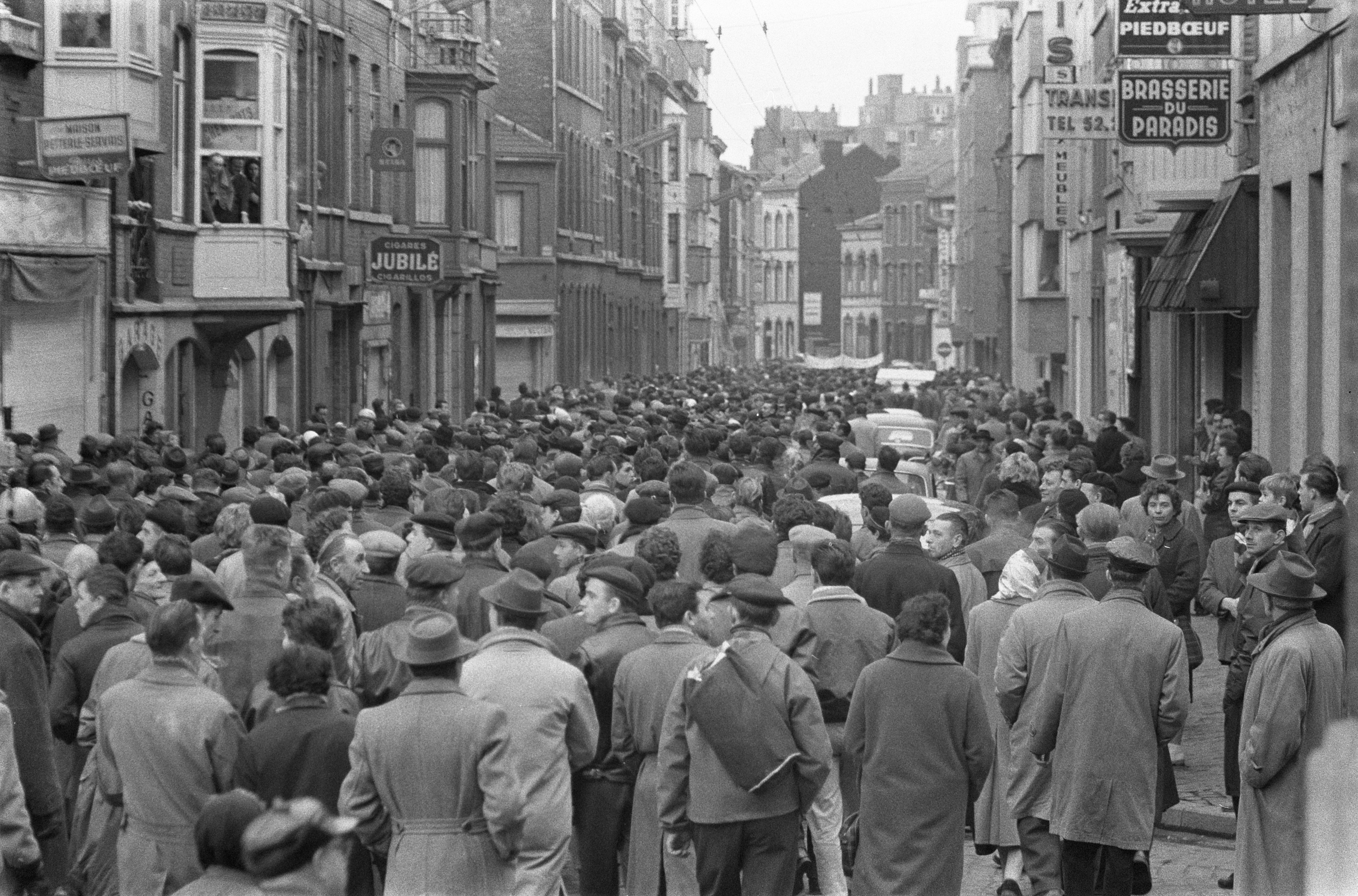
Demonstration in Liège during the general strike of 1960–1961

According to the historian Pierre Tilly, Renard emerged from the war as the "new strongman of Liège syndicalism". He was a leading advocate of the united trade union (syndicat unique) model which had been pioneered in the MSU. He became president of the newly established General Labour Federation of Belgium (Fédération Générale du Travail de Belgique, FGTB) which combined various left-wing unions into a single powerful federation. The position gave him wider political influence as well as considerable power within the labour movement. He cultivated a flamboyant lifestyle which further added to his public persona. In the immediate post-war years, contrary to some others on the left, he voiced support for the Marshall Plan and Benelux Economic Union in 1948 and the European Coal and Steel Community in 1951. Renard was a vocal opposition of the return of King Leopold III to the throne in the Royal Question which came to a head in August 1950. In the crisis and ensuing strikes, he was able to pose himself as a spokesman for Walloon public opinion and became interested in federalism.

Renard was blocked from succeeding Paul Finet as general secretary of the FGTB in 1952. Instead, Finet was replaced by Louis Major. Renard was promoted to the position of Deputy General Secretary, with responsibility for the FGTB's activities across Wallonia. By this point, his political thought had begun to focus on the idea of structural reform within Belgium which combined with the syndical unity and direct action already apparent in the MSU. Tilly writes:

In a context of increased interventionism which marked the post-war period, André Renard would defend a programme of structural reforms which would give new rights to workers in businesses, including those to participate in its management. It meant no more or less than controlling the economy. The programme, which sometimes appears confused, in its definition of co-management for example, remained finally highly theoretical. It did not detail in a precise manner the concrete measures to put in place to reach the sought-after aims.

Renard was most associated with the general strike of 1960–1961 which began as an opposition to the austerity measures of the Unitary Law initiated by the government of Gaston Eyskens. The strike has been described as "one of the most serious class confrontations in Belgium's social history" and involved 700,000 workers across the country but predominantly in Wallonia. It exposed the increasing divisions between the priorities of Flemish and Walloon syndicalists and the strike ultimately failed amid bitterness and recrimination within the FGTB.

=== Walloon Popular Movement, 1961–1962 ===
Renard blamed the national FGTB leadership for the failure of the general strike. He resigned from his position as deputy secretary general in 1961. He became increasingly interested in Walloon regionalism as a means to build a left-wing coalition that would pave the way for further economic democratisation. The same year, he established a federalist political movement called the Walloon Popular Movement (Mouvement Populaire Wallon, MPW) in 1961 which attracted a number of individuals who would subsequently emerge as leading figures within Walloon politics in the increasingly polarised linguistic politics of the 1970s and 1980s.

== Death and posthumous influence ==
Renard died on 20 July 1962, aged just 51. After his death, "Renardism" continued to serve as an intellectual influence in the Walloon Movement. He was named in a 1985 poll as the second most influential Walloon political figure after Jules Destrée. The André Renard Foundation (Fondation André Renard) was established in 1963.

== See also ==
- Regionalism (politics)
- Belgian general strikes
- History of the Walloon Movement
