= Léopold Genicot =

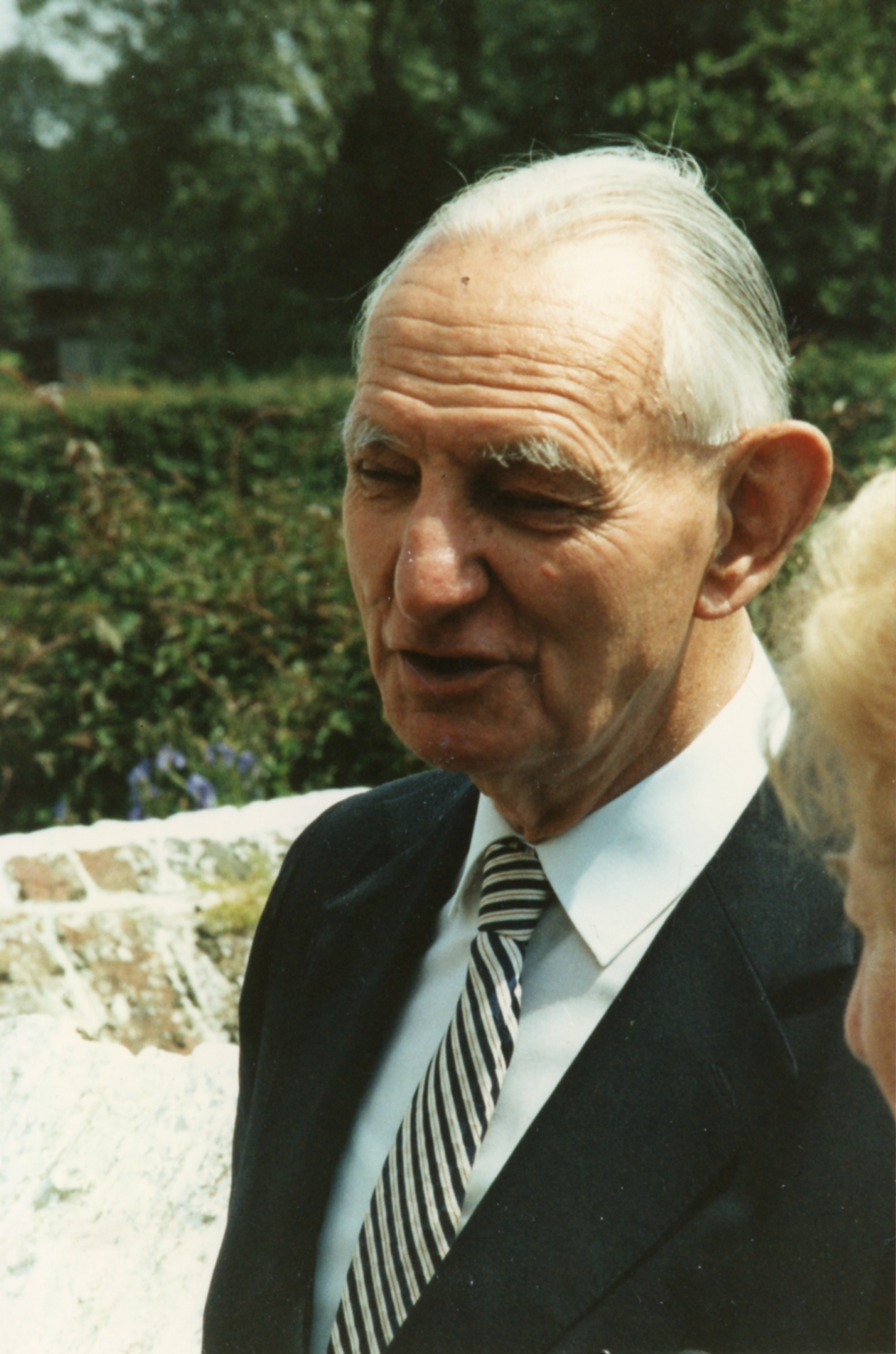
Image of Léopold Genicot

Léopold Genicot (Forville, Namur, 18 March 1914 - Ottignies, Louvain-la-Neuve, 11 May 1995) was a Belgian historian and medievalist and an activist for the Walloon Movement. He established a centre for the study of rural history and an influential series of guides to medieval historical sources.

== Life ==
Léopold Genicot was born in Forville, Belgium, in 1914. After earning his BA in political economy, he worked as an archivist in the Namur branch of the Royal Archives from 1935 to 1944. During that time, he obtained a doctorate in History in 1937. His work at the archives also allowed him to hide escaped prisoners during the Second World War.

In 1935, he was offered a position as professor at the Catholic University of Leuven, receiving tenure there in 1947. He taught diplomatic, methodology, Belgian history and medieval history. In his research, he was particularly interested in the history of Wallonia.

His contribution to Medieval History is well known, and his books and articles are used today in many medieval history classes.

In 1963, persuaded of the academic value of interdisciplinarity, he established a Centre for Rural History (Centre d'Histoire Rurale) and later still a Centre for Historical Ecology (Centre d'écologie historique), inviting historians to work together with geographers, agronomers, and other specialists in Earth Sciences in the newly established Institut Interfacultaire d'Études Médiévales (better known as the Institut d'Études Médiévales).

In 1972 he decided to start publishing a series of small monographs under the title Typologie des sources du Moyen Âge occidental ("typology of sources for the Western Middle Ages"), devising the editorial plan and writing an introductory volume the same year. The whole of this collection has acquired significant academic prestige and has continued to be published by Brepols. This collection was to serve a scholarly base of medievalists ranging from graduate students to professors and has become one of the most successful collections of introductory and bibliographical aids ever presented to the academic community of medieval history scholars. By publishing three to four titles a year, the series has steadily grown to seventy-eight volumes, covering everything in medieval studies and culture, from necrological documents to Latin treatises on the virtues and the vices, from astronomy to arms, from armour to other daily hardware.

=== Political activism ===
Genicot was a Catholic and a political militant on behalf of the Walloon Movement who had been a member of Rénovation wallone and a candidate for Rassemblement wallon in the European elections. As a politician, in 1995, by the time of his demise, his patriotic views had become gradually more regionalistic, favouring either an independent Wallonia or its integration into France.

== Awards, Honours and Distinctions ==
In 1964, he received the "Guaillarde d'Argent". In 1976 he was elected a Corresponding Fellow of the Medieval Academy of America, and in 1982 he received an honorary degree from the Catholic University of Lublin. In 1988, he was awarded the prize "Personnalité Richelieu" by the Belgium and Luxembourg branch of "Richelieu International".

He was the father of the architectural historian Luc-Francis Genicot (1938–2007), and the great-uncle of Garance Genicot and Frédérique Genicot.

== Publications ==
See , , .

Monographs

This is a partial list of Genicot's published monographs.

- Histoire des routes belges depuis 1704, Bruxelles: Office de publicité, 1948. 43 pags.
- Principe de Critique Historique. 5th ed. Louvain: Université catholique de Louvain, -1954. 54 pags.
- Les lignes de faîte du Moyen Âge, Paris: Ed. Casterman, 1951. (first English translation: Contours of the Middle Ages. London: Routledge & Keegan Paul, 1967). 394 pags. ISBN 0-710060157
- Le XIIIéme siècle européen, coll. Nouvelle Clio - l'histoire et ses problèmes, No. 18. Paris: Puf (Presses Universitaires de France), 1968, 409 pags. ISBN 2-13-038342-4
- Histoire de la Wallonie. coll. Histoire des provinces - Univers de la France et des pays francophones. Toulouse: Éditions universitaires Édouard Privat, 1973. 502 pags. ISBN 2-7089-1627-0
- Critique Historique. Louvain-la-Neuve: Cabay, 1979. 75 pags. ISBN 978-2-870771075
- La noblesse dans l'Occident médiéval. coll. Variorum collected studies series, No. 163. London: Variorum Reprints, 1982. 356 pags. ISBN 0860781119
- La Wallonie: un passé pour un avenir, coll. Écrits politiques wallons, No. 1. Mont-sur-Marchienne: Ed. Institut Jules Destrée, 1986, 163 pags.
- Racines d'espérance. Vingt siècles en Wallonie par les textes, les images et les cartes, Bruxelles: Didier Hatier, 1986. ISBN 2-87088-581-4
- Critique historique (2nd ed.) coll. Pédasup. Louvain-la-Neuve: Academia, 1987. ISBN 2-87209-004-5
- Rural Communities in the Medieval West, Baltimore, MD: Johns Hopkins University Press, 1990. 185 pags. ISBN 0801838703
- Calme Hesbaye, Mon village en Namurois, 1920-1930. Bruxelles: Didier Hatier, 1992. 184 pags. ISBN 2-87088774-4

Articles

This is a partial list of Genicot's published articles.

- "Discordiae concordantium: Sur l'intérêt des textes hagiographiques", Académie royale de Belgique: Bulletin de la Classe des Lettres et des Sciences Morales et Politiques, 5éme ser., No. 2/3, vol. 51 (1965), pp. 65–75.
- "Crisis: From the Middle Ages to Modern Times" in The Cambridge Economic History of Europe from the Decline of the Roman Empire, vol.I (2nd ed.) Cambridge: Cambridge University Press, 1966), ch. 8, pp. 660–742. ISBN 0-521045053doi:10.1017/CHOL9780521045056.016
- "Naissance, fonction et richesse dans l'ordonnance de la société médiévale. Le cas de la Noblesse du Nord-Ouest du Continent" in Problèmes de stratification sociale. Actes du Colloque international de Paris, 1966. Louvain: Centre belge d'histoire rurale, No. 14, 1968. pp. 83–100.
- "L'informatique au service de l'histoire des institutions et de la société" in La Lexicographie du latin médiéval et ses rapports avec les recherches actuelles sur la civilisation du Moyen âge (colloque international du Centre national de la recherche scientifique, Paris, 18–21 October 1978). coll. Colloques internationaux du CNRS, n° 581. Paris: CNRS, 1981. 547 p. ISBN 2-222-02649-0
- "Villes et campagnes dans les Pays-Bas médiévaux" in Acta historica et archaeologica mediaevalia, No. 7-8, 1986, pp. 163–192. ISSN 0212-2960
- "Un Equilibrage dans l'histoire médiévale: L'étude du monde rural" in Révue d'histoire ecclesiastique vol. 81, No. 3-4 (1986) pp. 501–527. ISSN 0035-2381
- "The Nobility in Medieval Francia: Continuity, Break or Evolution?" in Fredric L. Cheyette (ed.) Lordship and Community in Medieval Europe - Selected Readings. New York: Holt, Rinehart, and Winston, 1968, pp. 128–136. (1st. ed., 435 p.) [See Ch. 4, XII] ISBN 9780882752839

Editions

This is a partial list of Genicot's (co-)edited articles.

- Léopold Genicot and Paul Tombeur, Index Scriptorum Operumque Latino-Belgicorum medii Aevi. Nouveau répertoire des oeuvres mediolatines belges, 5 volumes (Bruxelles: Academie royale de Belgique. Comité national du dictionnaire du Latin médiéval, 1973–1979).
- Léopold Genicot, La Typologie des sources du moyen âge occidental, general editor (Turnhout, Belgium: Brepols, 1972-).
