= Belgian general strike of 1960–1961 =

General strike in Belgium

Strike of the Century
- Grève du Siècle; Part of general strikes in Belgium
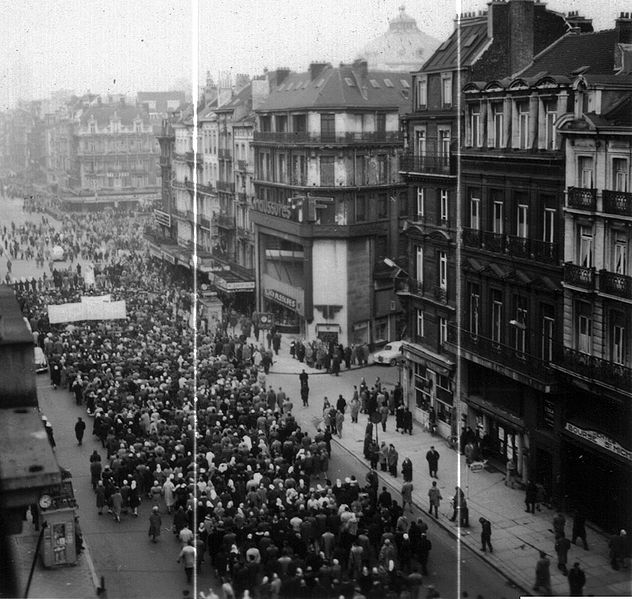
- Walloon strikers demonstrate in Brussels, late 1960
- Date: 1960-1961
- Location: Belgium
- Caused by: Proposed Unitary Law
- Methods: General strike

Parties
Workers; FGTB-ABVV	Belgian government Gendarmerie; Belgian Army

Lead figures
André Renard	Gaston Eyskens

Number
700,000	

Casualties and losses
4	

Casualties
- Results: Development of Renardism; Linguistic Wars; Eventual State reform

The general strike of 1960–1961 (French: Grève générale de 1960–1961), known popularly in Wallonia as the Strike of the Century (Grève du Siècle), was a major series of strikes in Belgium which began on 14 December 1960 and lasted approximately six weeks.

The general strike was instigated by the militant trade union, the General Labour Federation of Belgium (Fédération Générale du Travail de Belgique, or FGTB; Algemeen Belgisch Vakverbond, ABVV), against an attempt by the government of Gaston Eyskens to improve the state of Belgium's public finances after the independence of the Belgian Congo by introducing a series of austerity measures known as the Unitary Law (Loi Unique or Eenheidswet). It has been described as "one of the most serious class confrontations in Belgium's social history"; it brought 700,000 workers out on strike. There were a number of clashes between strikers and the police, Gendarmerie, and Belgian Army. In one incident, the Liège-Guillemins railway station was ransacked by strikers on 6 January 1961. Although the strike began across Belgium, it soon lost momentum in Flanders, where workers returned to work after a few days. The strike continued for several weeks in Wallonia, a region largely reliant on heavy industry and already starting to experience deindustrialization. The law was eventually passed on 14 February 1961. Four strikers died.

The strike is considered a key moment for the Walloon Movement and an influence on the formation of Walloon identity. It led to the foundation of a new ideology of Renardism which linked Walloon nationalism with syndicalism. The strike also led to the creation of the pro-federalist Walloon Popular Movement (Mouvement Populaire Wallon, MPW) in 1961 and an increasing polarization between Flemish and Walloons which culminated, from the late 1960s, in the "Linguistic Wars" and, ultimately, in Belgium's gradual transformation into a federal state.

The 1983 film Winter 1960 is based on the strike. The strike was the subject of the documentary film Lorsque le bateau de Léon M. descendit la Meuse pour la première fois (1979) by the Dardenne brothers.

== See also ==
- Belgian general strikes
- Misère au Borinage (1933)
- André Renard
- Split of the Catholic University of Leuven
- Congo Crisis (1960-65)
