= Unitary Law =

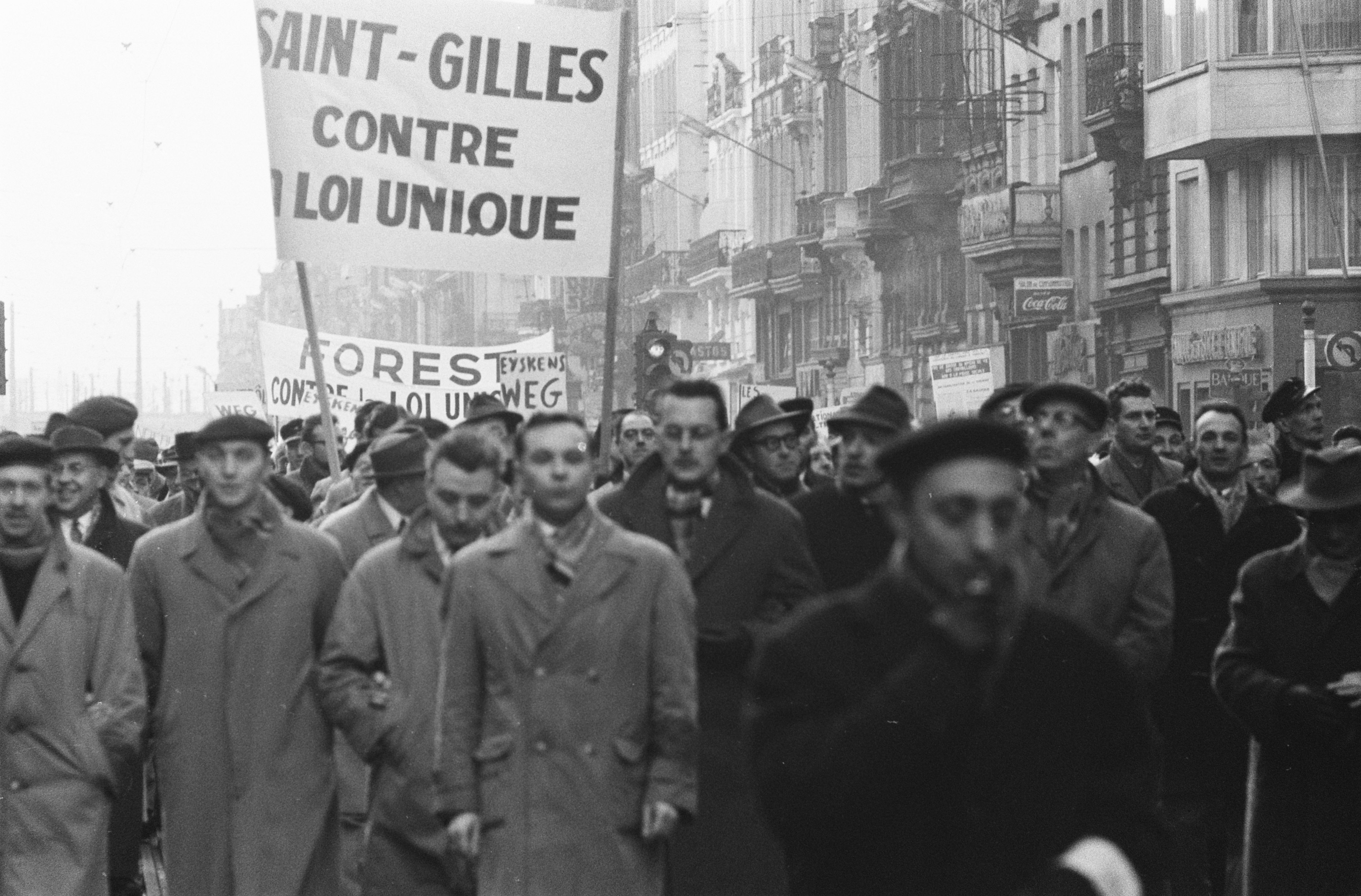
Photograph of crowds in Brussels demonstrating against the law during the general strike of 1960-61.

The Law on Economic Growth, Social Progress and Fiscal Redressment (French: Loi d'expansion économique, de progrès social et de redressement financier, Dutch: wet voor de economische expansie, de sociale vooruitgang en het financieel herstel), better known as the Unitary Law (Loi unique or Eenheidswet), was a controversial law in Belgium which was passed on 14 February 1961. It introduced a programme of fiscal austerity intended to reduce the country's large government debt and respond to the economic consequences of the independence of the Belgian Congo in June 1960. The Unitary Law was championed by Gaston Eyskens's coalition government of Eyskens's own Christian Social Party and the Belgian Liberal Party (Eyskens IV).

The bill met with fierce protest from Liberals and Socialists alike. Opposition culminated in a general strike over the winter of 1960-61, described as "one of the most serious class confrontations in Belgium's social history", which brought out 700,000 workers out on strike. The protest was unsuccessful, however, and the Unitary Law was passed on 14 February 1961 but the Eyskens IV government nonetheless collapsed in April 1961. New elections were held bringing to power a coalition of the Christian Social Party and Socialists.
