= Renardism =

Political ideology in Belgium

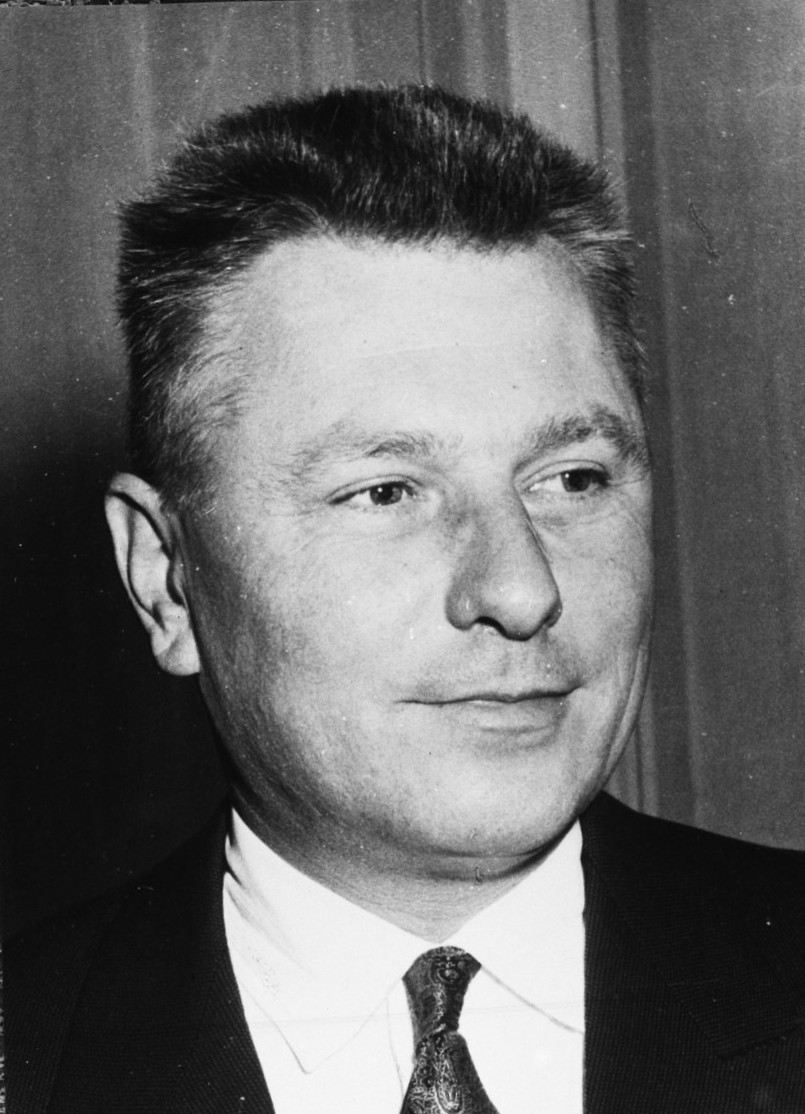
André Renard whose ideology formed the basis for "Renardism"

Renardism (French: Renardisme) refers to a political ideology in Belgium based on the thinking of the trade union leader André Renard (1911–62) which is generally considered to have emerged as a concept only in the years after his death. Although its exact nature has been much discussed, Renardism combined elements of syndicalism and regionalist politics which ultimately sought the transformation of the country into a federal state.

== André Renard and Renardism ==
Renard had been an active trades unionist before World War II. After 1945, he became involved with the Belgian socialist trades union, the General Federation of Belgian Labour (FGTB) but refused to adapt his populist rhetoric to fit within the mainstream Belgian Socialist Party (PSB). He strongly opposed the return of Leopold III during the Royal Question (1950) and supported the Belgian general strike of 1960–61. When the strike collapsed, he participated in the formation of the Mouvement populaire wallon (MPW) party. He died in 1962. Many of the positions of the MPW were adopted by the PSB at the Verviers Congress in 1967.

Renard's political ideas attracted a following within the FGTB and the Walloon Movement and outlived his own death. A staunch populist, inspired by Trotskyism and anarcho-syndicalism, Renard aimed to use industrial action to achieve structural reform which would provide greater autonomy to Wallonia and improve the situation of the working class. He strongly advocated federalism.

== See also ==
- Rattachism, a Walloon Movement ideology seeking "reunion" of the region with France
- Poujadism, French populist right-wing ideology founded in 1954
- Regionalism (politics)

== Bibliography ==
- Tilly, Pierre. "Le renardisme, un héritage durable ?" (PDF). Les Analyses de l'IHOES.
- Witte, Els; Craeybeckx, Jan; Meynen, Alain (2009). Political History of Belgium from 1830 Onwards (New ed.). Brussels: ASP. ISBN 978-90-5487-517-8.
