= Robert Demoulin =

Belgian history professor

Professor Robert Demoulin
- Born: 8 May 1911; Huy, Liège Province, Belgium
- Died: 27 March 2008 (aged 96); Liège, Walloon Region, Belgium

Academic background
- Education: Athénée royal de Huy
- Alma mater: University of Liège
- Thesis: Les Journées de septembre 1830 à Bruxelles et en province (1932)

Academic work
- Discipline: Historian
- Sub-discipline: 19th and 20th-century Belgium
- Institutions: University of Liège

Robert Demoulin (1911–2008) was a professor of contemporary Belgian history at the University of Liège.

== Life ==
Demoulin was born in Huy on 8 May 1911. He attended a state secondary school in Huy, and then the University of Liège, where he studied history. He graduated Ph.D. in 1932, with a thesis on the Belgian Revolution of 1830. In the mid-1930s he prospected in archives in Paris, London and The Hague, attending Charles Webster's seminar at the London School of Economics and Political Science, and François Simiand's lectures at the Collège de France. In 1938 he succeeded Herman Vander Linden lecturing on Belgian and contemporary history in Liège.

He was called up as a lieutenant in the reserves in 1940, and spent much of the Second World War as a prisoner of war in Germany, organising courses and lectures for fellow prisoners. In absentia he was appointed full professor in Liège in 1943.

He married the classical philologist Marielle Marique, and the couple had four children after the war. He resumed his academic duties in Liège in 1945. In 1946–1947 he travelled in the United States as a guest of the Rockefeller Foundation, visiting the universities of Yale, Harvard, Chicago and Columbia. He was particularly impressed by the interdisciplinarity of the Yale Institute of International Studies. In his seminars at the University of Liège, he became a pioneer in the use of press reports as historical source material.

In 1955 he was a co-founder of the Centre interuniversitaire d'histoire contemporaine (CIHC), and in 1969 took part in founding the Revue belge d'histoire contemporaine. He retired from teaching in 1981, but continued to publish. He died in Liège on 27 March 2008.

== Publications ==
- Les Journées de septembre 1830 à Bruxelles et en province (Liège and Paris, 1934).
- "La correspondance des consuls anglais en Belgique pendant la Révolution de 1830", Bulletin de la Commission royale d'histoire, vol. 98 (1934), pp. 417–534.
- Guillaume I et la transformation économique des provinces belges, 1815–1830 (Liège and Paris, 1938).
- La Révolution de 1830 (Brussels, 1950).
- "Unification politique, essor économique (1794-1914)", in Histoire de la Wallonie, edited by Léopold Genicot (Toulouse, 1973), pp. 313–412.
