= Walloon Movement =

Category of political ideologies in Belgium

The Walloon Movement (French: Mouvement wallon) is an umbrella term for all Belgian political movements that either assert the existence of a Walloon identity and of Wallonia and/or defend French culture and language within Belgium, either within the framework of the 1830 Deal or either defending the linguistic rights of French-speakers. The movement began as a defence of the primacy of French but later gained political and socio-economic objectives. In French, the terms wallingantisme and wallingants are also used to describe, sometimes pejoratively, the movement and its activists. To a lesser extent, the Walloon Movement is also associated with the representation of the small German-speaking population in the East of Belgium of the Walloon Region.

== History ==
Historians agree that the Walloon political movement began in 1880 with the foundation of a Walloon and French-speaking defence movement following the first linguistic laws of the 1870s. For historians like Lode Wils, the movement was born as a movement of administrative colonisation of Flanders. It took then the character of a movement asserting the existence of Wallonia and a Walloon identity without giving up the defence of French. Wallonia asserted timidly since 1898 but which becomes the principal claim since 1905 with a climax at the Walloon congress of 1912 and Jules Destrée's Letter to the King.

The First World War and a reviving of Belgian patriotism applied a brake to the movement and its spin offs. Walloon militants banded together in 1930s under the patronage of the Walloon Concentration where the radical ideas of 1912 were born again bringing into existence the linguistic laws of 1932. During the Second World War, several activists distinguished themselves within Resistance by forming various clandestine groupings. This world war radicalised even more the movement which for the first time speaks about independence ideas, and which will lead to its active participation in the Royal Question in 1950. Then follows a lull long of a decade which ends with the 1960–61 Winter General Strike with at its head André Renard who ally Walloon Movement claims and workers' claims. Gilson Act of 8 November 1962 and the transfer of Fourons (Voeren in Dutch) from Liège Province to Limburg Province resulted in political and linguistic strife with some violence during the 1970s and 1980s. The Fourons are still considered by walloon activists as a part of Wallonia occupied by Flanders, for example Walloon Minister-President Jean-Claude Van Cauwenberghe during a speech in 2001 described Wallonia 'from Fourons to Mouscron, from Nivelles to Arlon' and he also proposed in 2006 a Walloon constitution with a bi-regional status for the municipality in the Article 9.

== Ideological background ==
=== Francophilia ===
The central theme of the Walloon Movement is the ideals of the French revolution and a love of French language and culture. This francophilia gave rise to the Walloon Movement and the Walloon militants' aim of growing closer to France and more distant from the Netherlands, as expressed in an anti-Benelux policy:

"In fact, the Walloon Movement is the first (and virtually the only) organisation to warn public opinion against the implications of the Benelux policy and, as a counterbalancing or complementary force, to call for closer economic and cultural cooperation with France. […] When viewed as a modern version of Orangism, the pro-Benelux policy can be seen to promote certain Flemish interests. According to Georges Dotreppe, a member of the directory of "Wallonie Libre", the Benelux concept, created on English soil and orientated towards Great Britain and the United States, supports an Anglo-Saxon anti-French policy which in no way embraces the interest of Wallonia, a sister community of France."

"Rattachism", the French irredentist trend in the Walloon Movement, is a good example of this love for the French republic. This sentiment is notably expressed by Albert du Bois, who in his book The Belgians or the French?, published in 1903, denounces the subjection of the Walloons to the Flemings, who are merely the successors of the previous Dutch, Austrians and Spanish occupiers of Wallonia. The French soul of the Walloons must drive them to yearn for a return to "l'œuvre de Quatre-vingt-treize" (the invasion of the Southern Netherlands provinces by the French in 1793) and the destruction of the international agreements of 1814 and 1830. The same thesis is developed in the "Walloon's Catechism", widely distributed in the same year of 1903."

=== Left-wing politics ===
The Walloon Movement was a left wing movement from its beginning. Started in liberal left societies, it quickly became a rallying cry for a liberal-socialist coalition against the conservatives of the Catholic Party whose power base was in the Flemish-speaking provinces. During the interbellum between World War I and World War II, many of the Christian left joined the Walloon Movement, notably the Abbé Mahieu, an anticlerical Catholic priest. The movement was the focus of several attempts to create left-wing party, for example the Walloon Democratic and Socialist Rally (Rassemblement démocratique et socialiste wallon) created during World War II.

==== Class struggle and Renardism ====
Many Walloon militants consider their movement as an incarnation of the social struggle and a way to fight for the workers' cause.

The tension between the class struggle and Walloon empowerment brought forth two view points. One prioritised the class struggle and the other, Renardism saw both being achieved together. Jules Destrée, in a speech on 9 November 1913, declared that 'the Walloon Movement is not, cannot be, as well as the Flemish Movement a cause of division of the worker class. On the contrary, each time that there will be only their interests of class, workers, all workers must find themselves united.'

Renardism is an ideology combining syndical struggle and Walloon militancy. Conceived by André Renard, he finely defined it:

They made us believe in the socialist opening in Flanders. Just look at numbers. For me, the combat remains whole, but I choose the best ground and the best weapons. For the moment, the best ground and the best weapons are in Wallonia, the best road passes by the defense of the Walloon interests. I am at the same time socialist and Walloon and I embrace the Walloon theses because they are socialist.

The struggle was typified by the internecine strife between workers during the strike of 1960–61.

==== Internationalism ====
The Walloon Movement ideology with the arrival of socialists within it was subsumed by a proletarian internationalism, Jules Destrée considered that "the Walloon Movement is not in contradiction with internationalism. On the contrary, by creating a nation new, free and independent, it facilitates the creation of solid agreements between the nations, which is by definition internationalism".

Walloon militants often regard Belgium as an invention of the bourgeoisie.

== Role and campaigns ==
=== Unilingual Belgicism ===
The defence of French as Belgium's sole official language was a historical campaign of the Walloon Movement.

Militants at that time were in favour of the "Belgian contract" that, according to them, allowed only French to be used in Belgium's official life. Belgian revolutionaries in 1830 decided to give preference to the French language, firstly in order to reduce the influence of the Dutch from whom they had separated and secondly because they were from the Francophile bourgeoisie—if not actually originating from France—and supported the principles of the French Revolution.

A Flemish Movement was quickly created to recognize the Dutch language. The first Walloon militants then set up a "French-speaking and Walloon defence movement" to fight against the official recognition of Dutch. The militants from the French-speaking areas were joined by members of the liberal bourgeoisie from Brussels and the Dutch-speaking provinces. These allies somewhat surprisingly joined the Francophiles because much of their work was in the bureaucracy where the introduction of another language would have been prejudicial.

This idea quickly began to disappear after 1898, the year in which the Coremans-De Vriendt law was enacted and Dutch was recognized as an official language of Belgium.

=== Front for francophones ===
The defence of francophones and the French language started up after the failure to keep unilingual belgicism. Various organizations represented it, as the League against the Flemishisation of Brussels in the 1930s which fought for bilingualism in some communes of Brussels.

This trend became again more widespread with the end of the linguistic censuses and fixing of the linguistic border in 1962–1963. At the elections of 1965, a party called Democratic Front of Francophones of Brussels (FDBF, now FDF) arose and had three deputies and one senator.

=== Autonomism ===
The autonomist or separatist trend appeared on 15 March 1898 in The Walloon Soul (L'Âme wallonne). This propaganda paper of the Walloon League of Liège published on first page a plea in favour of the administrative separation of the country: "Let us take the offensive openly and continue as of today the obtention of a separatist regime, before they strip us and reduce more still". Concepts of autonomy vary from federalism to confederalism within the Belgian framework according to autonomist activists but there are also separatists promoting autonomy within a European framework in the case of a "Europe of the Regions".

=== Independentism ===
This trend inside the Walloon Movement is the youngest. It was born during the Second World War, in the Walloon Democratic and Socialist Rally ("Rassemblement démocratique et socialiste wallon" – RDSW), a group mainly from Liège which arose at the end of 1942. It grouped together politicians and Walloon militants. The RDSW's attempt to create a unique party for the left was without success. It also aimed to be a working group, in which the liberal Fernand Schreurs and the socialist Fernand Dehousse take part, on the future statute of Wallonia. The independence manifesto was written in November 1943, after the departure of the federalists, in the form of a draft Constitution for a Walloon republic. Its principle rests on "the formation of an independent Walloon State, suitable to be associated with a Flemish State and a State of Brussels, but integrated in the defensive system of France".

The RDSW draft was presented at the Walloon nation congress in 1945 but only during the "sentimental vote", in which it received only 154 votes out of 1048 voters, or 14.6%. After the congress, this trend remained discrete until the sixties. During the general strike of 1960–1961 Renardism appeared, an independentist trend for a socialist and syndical Wallonia, but its failure after this strike forces this syndical enterprise to be folded back on the constitution of a federalistic lobbying group, the Walloon Popular Movement (Mouvement Populaire Wallon – MPW).

During the 1970s and '80s, several parties with an independentist programme were created, such as the Walloon Popular Rally (Rassemblement populaire wallon – RPW) and the Front for the Independence of Wallonia (Front pour l'Indépendance de la Wallonie – FIW) but after electoral failures, especially the European elections on 17 June 1984, they sank into oblivion. It is the Rattachist trend that today gathers the most enthusiasm of Walloon militants unhappy with the result of institutional reforms in favour of the autonomy of Wallonia within Belgium.

=== Rattachism ===
Rattachisme (literally "re-attachment-ism") has historically been a sub-group within the Walloon Movement which advocates the secession of Wallonia and its merger into France.

The origins of this idea can be traced to "Reunionism" which emerged after the Belgian Revolution, advocated by Alexandre Gendebien amongst others. They believed that only union with France would secure Belgium's independence from the Netherlands. France had ruled the entire country during the French Revolutionary Wars and Reunionists envisaged the whole of Belgium joining with France rather than Wallonia alone.

Rattachism re-emerged during the Twentieth Century within the Walloon Movement. Count Albert du Bois and his Catechism of the Walloon that affirms French identity of the Walloon. He participated in the newspaper Le Réveil wallon, clearly Francophile and rattachist. This trend is currently represented by the party Rassemblement Wallonie-France.

== See also ==
- Partition of Belgium
- Wallonia
- Wallonie Libre
- List of active separatist movements in Europe

== Bibliography ==
=== French ===
- L'Encyclopédie du Mouvement wallon, Institut Jules Destrée, Charleroi, 2000
- Philippe Destate, L'Identité wallonne, Institut Jules Destrée, coll. Notre Histoire, Charleroi, 1997
- Chantal Kesteloot, Mouvement Wallon et identité nationale, Courrier Hebdomadaire du CRISP, No. 1392, 1993.
- Chantal Kesteloot, Tendances récentes de l'historiographie du mouvement wallon (1981–1995), Revue Belge d'Histoire Contemporaine, XXV, 1994–1995, 3-4, pp. 539–568. pdf

=== Dutch ===
- Maarten Van Ginderachter, Het kraaien van de haan, Cahiers Jan Dhondt 3, Acamedia Press, Gand, 2005 pdf
