= History of the Walloon Movement =

The Walloon Movement traces its ancestry to 1856 when literary and folkloric movements based around the Society of Walloon language and literature began forming. Despite the formation of the Society of Walloon Literature, it was not until around 1880 that a "Walloon and French-speaking defense movement" appeared, following the linguistic laws of the 1870s. The movement asserted the existence of Wallonia and a Walloon identity while maintaining the defense of the French language.

== Origins ==
During French control of the Low Countries, linguistic problems arose with the first language laws. After the invasion of the Austrian Netherlands, French revolutionaries began the "francisation" of the country. Under the Old Regime French coexisted with many languages, including Latin and English, but the decree of 2nd Thermidor Year II made French the official language of France and its territories. Revolutionary France differentiated between Flemish and Walloon provinces: "It seems the revolutionaries themselves consider the fact French was enough close to the Walloon language so as not to manage Wallonia as Brittany, Corsica, Alsace or Flanders." The French Consulate and Empire extended the francisation process by requiring all the civil servants of Flanders to become French citizens. Authorities sent members of the French bourgeoisie and clergy to Belgium to replace Belgian elites and moved Belgian elites to France to remove them from their roots and their culture. For example, Flemish seminarians were trained in Paris and Lyon under the direction of Jean-Armand de Roquelaure, the archbishop of Mechelen, a French clerk installed by French authorities.

After the fall of the French Empire, the Congress of Vienna united the Belgian provinces of the Austrian Netherlands with the former Dutch Republic, forming the United Kingdom of the Netherlands. The new ruler of the United Kingdom, William I, gave Dutch the status of "national language" in order to reduce the influence of French ideas. On 15 September 1819, William I decreed Dutch as the official language for justice and governmental administration although he did not prohibit the use of other languages. According to Hervé Hasquin the goal of these policies was the 'cultural homogenization of our regions'. William I "believed or feigned to believe that French was introduced into the Walloon provinces only under the pressure of foreign influence." The linguistic barrier "acquired administrative significance for the first time in 1822 with William I's legislation on the use of Dutch in Flemish communes." William's linguistic policies were one of the contributing factors that led to the Belgian Revolution of 1830 and the linguistic legislation of the first unionist governments.

The young Belgian government officially recognized only the French language, though the Constitution allowed for the free use of all languages. In the 1840s the Flemish Movement appeared in response to the Belgian government's recognition of French as the official language. The Walloon Movement developed subsequently as a reaction to the claims of the Flemish Movement.

== 1880–1898: Opposition to official recognition of Dutch ==
Born in Flanders and in Brussels, a French-speaking movement was set up within civil servant circles to combat the introduction of Dutch as the language of administration. For the first Walloon militants the recognition of Dutch meant job losses, the infantilisation of the culture, and an attack on national unity. In 1877 the first political Walloon association, the Walloon League of Ixelles, was formed. In 1883 the Walloon Beehive in Anvers, whose motto is "Walloon I am, Belgian first and foremost", was founded. The Walloon movement developed rapidly in the south but was mostly confined to the bourgeoisie. The liberal leading elements of the bourgeoisie consider the Flemish Movement as a machination proposing to keep the Dutch-speaking provinces under the heel of religion. Arnaud Pirotte disagreed with the notion that the Walloon movement started with the Walloon reaction to the success of the Flemish Movement.

The first members of the Walloon Movement promoted neither federalism nor separatism. Their rhetoric was confined to defending Belgium and the use of the French language. For the early Walloon Movement, the daily use of the French language was considered the cement holding the country together:

The emerging Walloon Movement thus fits in a Belgian perspective as its contours and especially its linguistic identity was defined for this State in 1830. It regards the acquisition of the French language as a form of adhesion to Belgium and to the great principles of freedom in the Constitution.

During this period a variety of Walloon leagues fought against the use of Dutch as the official language. The most prominent was the Society of Walloon Propaganda, which was founded on 23 February 1888 by lawyer Édouard Termonia. The Society had three goals: to defend the acquired rights of the Walloon agents in civil service; to defend the French language and culture; and to unify the varied Walloon leagues of Brussels under a common banner. The Society organized the first Walloon congresses in Brussels in July 1890, in Namur in December 1891, in Liège in November 1892, and in Mons in November 1893. Yves Quairiaux writes that at the Mons congress delegates from Walloon provinces were in the minority and the assembly voted in favor of teaching Dutch in French-speaking provinces. The first congresses were unpopular, especially in southern Belgium, and the first members of the Walloon Movement were so disorganized that the fifth congress (to be held in 1894) was cancelled. In 1895 the Society of Walloon Propaganda asked deputies to leave an assembly when a French-speaking orator presented a speech in Dutch. In 1896, when the Coremans-De Vriendt law was first proposed, the Society of Walloon Propaganda and the Walloon League of Ixelles began a protest campaign. They sent petitions signed by communal administrations and members of the bar to the Senate. The first article of the Coremans-De Vriendt law declares that "the laws are voted, sanctioned, promulgated and published in French language and Dutch language". The law reminded the Walloon Movement that their privileges were endangered by the recognition of Dutch as an official language for administration and justice.

== 1898–1914: Political creation of Wallonia ==
=== 1898–1904: Political awakening ===
The Coremans-De Vriendt law, called the "law of Equality" ("Gelijkheidswet" in Dutch), was passed by a small majority in both the Chamber of the Deputies and the Senate. In the Chamber of the Deputies only twenty-one Wallooon Deputies voted yes, while nineteen voted no, and four abstained. In the Senate only three of the forty Walloon Senators present voted to pass the law. The law was promulgated on 18 April 1898, constituting a turning point in the history of the Walloon Movement. The Walloon Movement, once confined to Brussels and Flanders, grew because of increased participation from French-speaking Belgians living in the south. The Society of Walloon Propaganda, once the engine of the Walloon Movement, had faded and disappeared by the 1900s. The Walloon League of Liège, founded in 1897 by the liberal Julien Delaitte, assumed the leadership of the Walloon Movement.

After the passage of the Coremans-De Vriendt law, the Walloon League of Liège called for the creation of a Walloon National League. The Walloon National League, founded on 8 May 1898, led the Walloon Movement from 1898 to 1905, a period which saw the affirmation of a political Wallonia at the expense of French-speaking interests in Flanders and Brussels. In 1899 the Society of Walloon Propaganda asked for the seat of the Walloon National League to be transferred to Brussels, but the measure failed because "other towns of Wallonia estimat[ed] that Liège was the Walloon capital".

The political relationship between the Walloon language and the Walloon Movement also changed. Before the Coremans-De Vriendt law, the idea of the equality of all languages was not accepted by Walloon militants who considered Flemish to be an idiom. In their eyes the Flemings had to give up their idiom just as the Walloons had done. The recognition of Dutch pushed the Walloon Movement to more adamantly defend the Walloon language. This transition is indicated by the Walloon League of Liège beginning its publication of articles in Walloon. Before the Walloon League of Liège, the use of the Walloon language had been confined to religious and folk publications. The promotion of the Walloon language was never strong with Wallingants who were attached to French Jacobinism.

French-speaking elites, fearful of becoming a minority after the recognition of Dutch as the official language, began creating a French-speaking unilingual Wallonia. Promoted in 1844 by Joseph Grandgagnage, the word Wallonie indicated a linguistic and cultural area. Gradually it acquired political significance. The acquisition of a political meaning began with the creation of federalistic projects in Belgium.

=== 1905–1914: Political affirmations ===
In 1905 the fifth Walloon congress, which took place in Liège at the Liège International exposition, was a new step for the Walloon Movement. After the congress separatist ideas began to mature. Julien Delaite, a leader of the Walloon Movement, explained what his vision of the Walloon Movement was in a speech at the salle académique of the University of Liège:

We organized it apart from any spirit of party, to expose the right claims of the Walloons and to exalt the walloon spirit. We do want to criticize only what is criticizable, but we want to say everything, say it without fear. We do not attack the Flemings, but we intend to whip the flamingant exaggerations that threaten the integrity of the Belgian fatherland. We want also to clarify what the Walloons were in the past, what they carry out in the present, what they aspire for the future.

After this congress, the Walloon Movement increasingly embraced separatism. The congress of 1905 reunited twenty-five societies and liberal minded politicians, artists, and industrialists who were inhabitants of Liège. Another political shift started during this period with socialists joining the Walloon Movement in increasing numbers.

The massive arrival of socialists was caused not only by a linguistic cleavage, but also by a political cleavage. Since October 1884 Belgium saw a succession of catholic governments whose supporters were largely Dutch-speaking. The historian Maarten Van Ginderachter writes that Walloons were excluded from national power. Between 1884 and 1902 there was only one Walloon in the Belgian government. Liberals and socialists agreed to organize nationally for the 1912 legislative and provincial elections. The defeat of the socialist-liberal political alliance by the Catholic Party initiated a profound change within the movement. The majority of Walloon militants, and this for a few years, have considered whereas the catholic conservative majority in North is installed for a long time and that makes sterile the leftist majority in the South, which the newspaper Het Laatste Nieuws underlined during the project of flemishisation of the University of Ghent: "Again we draw the attention of everyone to the tactics of the opponents to Flemish Movement: they know that they are swept everywhere in Flemish areas—consequently they must excite the Walloons".

Government composition, 1884–1911
| Periods and Governments | Flemish ministers | Ministers from Brussels | Walloon Ministers |
| A. Beernaert: 26 October 1884 – 17 March 1894 | 60% | 14% | 26% |
| J. de Burlet: 26 March 1894 – 25 June 1896 | 75% | 9% | 16% |
| P. de Smet de Naeyer: 26 June 1896 – 23 January 1899 | 87% | - | 13% |
| J. Vandenpeereboom: 24 January 1899 – 31 July 1899 | 84% | - | 16% |
| P. de Smet de Naeyer: 5 August 1899 – 12 April 1907 | 76% | - | 24% |
| J. de Trooz: 1 May 1907 – 31 December 1907 | 67% | 11% | 22% |
| F.Schollaert: 9 January 1908 – 8 June 1911 | 57% | 22% | 21% |
| Ch. de Broqueville: 18 June 1911 – 4 August 1914 | 42% | 22% | 36% |

This observation weighs heavy in "the passage from a unitarian antiflamingantism to the strictly Walloon claims". The congress of 1912 is then the occasion to clearly assert the administrative separation and the existence of Wallonia. This political proposal, already timidly advanced since 1897 and 1898 respectively per Albert Mockel and Julien Delaite, becomes one of the principal claims of Walloon Movement starting from this "Congress of combat" as its organizers define it. And it is during the same congress of 1912 that Walloon nationalism is really born: a Walloon Assembly is made up as an unofficial Walloon Parliament of which the goal first is the promotion of the idea of an administrative separation with the unilinguism in Wallonia and bilingualism in Flanders. This obvious imbalance in the Walloon claims will only radicalize the Flemish Movement.

The Walloon Assembly is really the first unified walloon organism and it acquired et it quickly acquires a great influence on the Walloon Movement that it keeps until the beginning of the 1930s. This unofficial parliament will be the symbol of the combat for the autonomy of the Walloon nation, it will define the walloon flag and also the way the country should be divided administratively in two with the choice of Namur as capital and the division of the province of Brabant. Choice what will follow the Germans within the framework of Flamenpolitik intended to destroy Belgium. In spite of the defense of unionistic theses, the policies of the Walloon movement are shown intended to irrevocably divide Belgium.

This is also in the spirit of these congress that socialist Jules Destrée write his Lettre au Roi sur la séparation de la Wallonie et de la Flandre, letter that represents perfectly with the Walloon Assembly that period of the Movement. Extremely agitated period of toughening as show the events happened during the "Joyeuse Entrée" of king Albert I in Liège on 13 July 1913 when he is welcome by separatists demonstrations: The socialist and republican newspaper Le Peuple wrote "When, between provincial palate and the Town hall, crowd breaks the police cords protecting the king, the exasperated wallonisants benefit from the distress for to express with the royal family their aspirations of independence. Holding up the Walloon flag with the red cock, they precipitate towards the pram and balance under the nose of the king the new colors". It adds that "while flowers fall from the stages rises the dominating cry 'Lives Wallonia!'." Other newspapers as the Gazette de Liège minimized these demonstrations.

During World War I, on 3 May 1918, an informant of the Belgian Embassy in the Netherlands sent this report to this Embassy: As determined by domestic policy, the ruling of the country belongs to a party which leans principally on the Flemish and agricultural regions of Belgium while the Walloon and industrial regions of the country are totally excluded from this running. It is an abnormal situation, which is caused by a bad application of the parliamentarian (...) which was already obvious before the war and which will deteriorate. The difference between the Flemish issue and the Walloon issue is that the Flemings are pursuing intellectual and moral goals while the Walloons are demanding the immediate abolition of a situation they consider improper and hurtful. This report was sent to King Albert and his Government in Sainte-Adresse (NPDC)

== 1915–1939: Interbellum ==
=== 1915–1929: Brakings and dissensions ===
The First World War revived the patriotism in Belgium, especially after the application of the Flamenpolitik by German occupying forces during the war. Even though the majority of the wallingant and flamingant organizations ceased their activities, a minority of Walloon and Flemish militants collaborated with the Germans. Walloon activism is even more marginal than the Flemish side, but it seemed less handled by the German authorities than this last. At the end of the war, Walloon and Flemish activists will be severely judged but only Flemish activism will be used during the interbellum against Flemish revendications since Spring 1919, whereas Walloon activism sinks into oblivion, the French-speaking press and also Wallingant propaganda papers to buckle down to create an image of a "Flandre embochée" (German-friendly Flanders):

It is true that French-speaking press won't cease to discredit on all flemish by amalgaming it with activists' actions led under the high patronage of the hatred Germany. Indeed, since Spring 1919, press articles begin to associate activism and Flemish Movement; that will create an image of a "Flandre embochée" [...] At the end of the war, walloon activists are judged with the same virulence that their flemish counterparts and for the same reasons. But, once condemned, they disappear from memories; whereas flemish activism is more and more used against flemish revendications.

The experience of World War I and the reviving of Belgian patriotism brake the Walloon Movement that only began to affirm itself few years early, and are a source of division in the Movement. The Walloon Assembly, at that time the standard-bearer of wallingant revendications, adopt a Belgian nationalist position, position opposed to its prime goal. That involves tensions with the more radicals wallingants who then leave the Assembly and its satellites. These tensions arrive at the moment of linguistic law of 31 July 1921 which envisages the constitution of 3 linguistic Regions, two unilingual—one Dutch-speaking and a French-speaking—and one bilingual. Even if in the facts the bilingual communes and of the Dutch-speaking Area and the French-speaking Area become all French-speaking and that the bilingualism of Brussels was also regarded as a victory by the French-speaking people, this law is felt as a threat by the Walloon militants because it blames the experiment up to now unilingual of Wallonia: the law provides indeed that the other language can be used in each linguistic Region. Despite every amendments brought to the law at the Senate, only three walloon deputies on fifty-nine with the Room will vote for it: fifty and one vote against and six abstain from. Since 1920, the Assembly undergoes a large disaffection and loses its more famous names whereas create for themselves dissenting leagues a little everywhere. The Action Committee of the Walloon Assembly in Liege becomes a new Walloon League of Liège and affirms itself more and more since 1923 as the new leader of the movement. This league undertakes then to do a hard work of propaganda: from 1924 to 1930, it organizes seven annual congresses from which is born a new gathering of walloon associations, the Walloon Concentration.

=== 1930–1939: Walloon nationalism reaffirmed ===
The supremacy of the new Walloon League of Liège and its Walloon Concentration represent this period of radicalization toward 'wallingantism'. The 1930s were a period of radicalization for many reasons: the linguistic law of 1921 stipulating the use of Dutch language in Wallonia, the reciprocal radicalization of the Flemish Movement, and an atmosphere heavy with the birth or consolidation of ideologies such as fascism, communism and Nazism.

The Walloon Concentration, initiated by the most radicalized factions, organized congresses within the Walloon Concentration. The first congress was organized in Liège on 27 and 28 September 1930, at the occasion of the Centennial of the independence of Belgium. The wish of the organizers was that all trends, both extremist and moderate, should be represented. The congress members all rallied in one intransigent motion: the French identity and integrity of Wallonia and the recognition to Flemish people of their own identity. Their position was total regional unilinguism. They decided that it is within the framework of Belgium, the solution for the Walloon-Flemish disagreement should be found, and a constitutional revision should be created. To this end, they decided to create a commission to work out a project to be presented at the next congress. At this next congress, the commission presented its choice: a federalist project, preferred to a provincialist project more moderated and to a simple separatism. A text of resolution was redesigned, and the unanimity of congress members ratified it, except 9 abstentions mainly from delegates of the Arrondissement of Brussels. This resolution is also the first important text where Christian leftists were involved, as Élie Baussart.

This returned to the ideas of 1912 and this inversion in the Walloon claimed to the profit of a unilingual Dutch-speaking area came mainly from the fear of the "Flemish islets"—a tool of the Flemish "imperialism" in wallingant speech—in the French-speaking provinces, because the linguistic law of 1921 envisaged the use of Dutch there. Moreover, many Dutch-speakers settle in the South of the country to work, a fact not appreciated by the wallingants because these new populations are often close to the Catholic Party and could call into question the unilinguism of Wallonia, as stated by the liberal François Bovesse:

Walloons! Beware of this aspect of the problem. The prolific Flanders is invading us slowly; if those who come to us and that we welcome fraternally isolate themselves in Flemish linguistic groups, if some fanaticism helps them to not be absorbed, if a blurred administrative legislation in linguistic matters favours this non-absorption, Walloons, beware; in fifty years your land won't be yours any more.
It's hard, it's harsh to "drop" the French of Flanders, it would much harder and more dangerous to sacrifice our linguistic unity.

At the same time, the linguistic law is also regarded as dangerous by Flemish militants because according to them, it contributes to territorial nibbling in favour of the French language. The wallingants then put agreement with the flamingants. On 16 March 1929, wallingant Destrée and flamingant Camille Huysmans sign, with 26 other socialist deputies within the P.O.B, the "Compromis des Belges" (Compromise of the Belgians) for the linguistic and cultural homogeneity of the Flanders and Wallonia, leading to the linguistic law of 14 July 1932. It prescribes Dutch as the official language of the Flanders, and French as official language of Wallonia, consciously sacrificing the linguistic rights of the French-speaking people of Flanders.

Other congresses of the Walloon Concentration are organized to the war, as the congress of 1935 during which the militants assert the right for the Walloons to dispose of themselves. Those of 1933 and 1936 are the occasion to affirm the need of an economic collaboration between France and Belgium and to criticize the Belgian foreign policy of neutrality asserting which it is wished by Germany and that a bringing together with France was preferable, position registered in the Francophile tradition of the Walloon movement. The congress of 1937 is the abandonment of the federalist project for confederalism in order to favor a Walloon foreign policy, notoriously pro-French.

The end of the interbellum is also the time of the formation of the first Walloon political parties, for example the Nationalist Walloon Party-French Party and the Democratic Walloon Party both created for the anticipated elections of 2 April 1939. The first one created was the Walloon League of Deux-Houdeng in 1938, following Albert du Bois' rattachist thought, but disappeared rapidly. The second, Mahieu's Democratic Walloon Front, transformed into a political party a few weeks before the elections. Without any backup from Walloon associations and with only two important figures with Jules Mahieu and Arille Carlier, this wallingant party got only 10,000 votes in the seven counties where it was present.

== See also ==
- Walloon Movement

=== Bibliography ===
- (in French) L'Encyclopédie du Mouvement wallon, Institut Jules Destrée, Charleroi, 2000
- (in French) Philippe Destate, L'Identité wallonne, Institut Jules Destrée, coll. Notre Histoire, Charleroi, 1997
- (in Dutch) Maarten Van Ginderachter, Het kraaien van de haan, Cahiers Jan Dhondt 3, Acamedia Press, Gand, 2005 pdf
- (in French) Chantal Kesteloot, Mouvement Wallon et identité nationale, Courrier Hebdomadaire du CRISP, No. 1392, 1993.
- (in French) Chantal Kesteloot, Tendances récentes de l'historiographie du mouvement wallon (1981–1995), Revue Belge d'Histoire Contemporaine, XXV, 1994–1995, 3–4, pp. 539–568. pdf
- (in French) Astrid Von Busekist La Belgique. Politique des langues et construction de l'État. 1780 à nos jours, Louvain, Duculot, 1997. ISBN 978-2-8011-1179-6
