= Liège International Exposition (1905) =

World's fair held in Liège, Belgium

1905 Liège
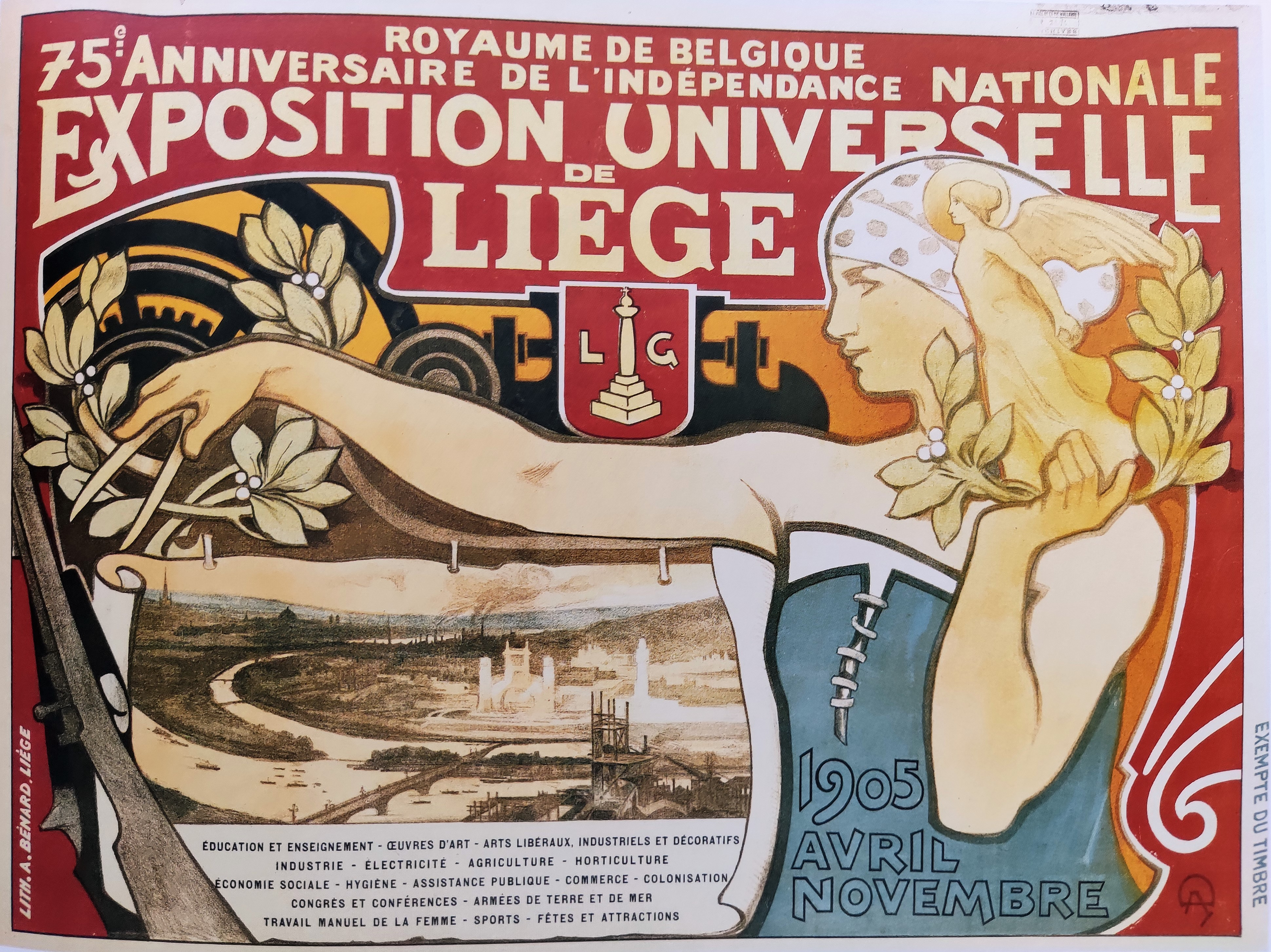
- Poster for the exhibition

Overview
- BIE-class: Universal exposition
- Category: Historical Expo
- Name: Exposition universelle et internationale de Liège
- Building(s): Palais des Beaux-Arts de Liège
- Area: 21.08 hectares (52.1 acres)
- Visitors: 7,000,000

Participant(s)
- Countries: 29

Location
- Country: Belgium
- City: Liège
- Venue: Parc de la Boverie
- Coordinates: 50°37′43.98″N 5°34′32.56″E

Timeline
- Opening: 25 April 1905
- Closure: 6 November 1905

Universal expositions
- Previous: Louisiana Purchase Exposition in St. Louis
- Next: Milan International (1906) in Milan

The Liège International Exposition (French: Exposition universelle et internationale de Liège) of 1905 was a world's fair held in Liège, Belgium, from 27 April to 6 November 1905 just eight years after a previous exposition held in Brussels. Intended to show Liège's industrial importance, the fair also marked 75 years of Belgian independence and 40 years of King Leopold II's reign.

The exposition received 7 million visitors, covered 52 acres and made 75,117 Belgian francs.

== Participants and exhibits ==
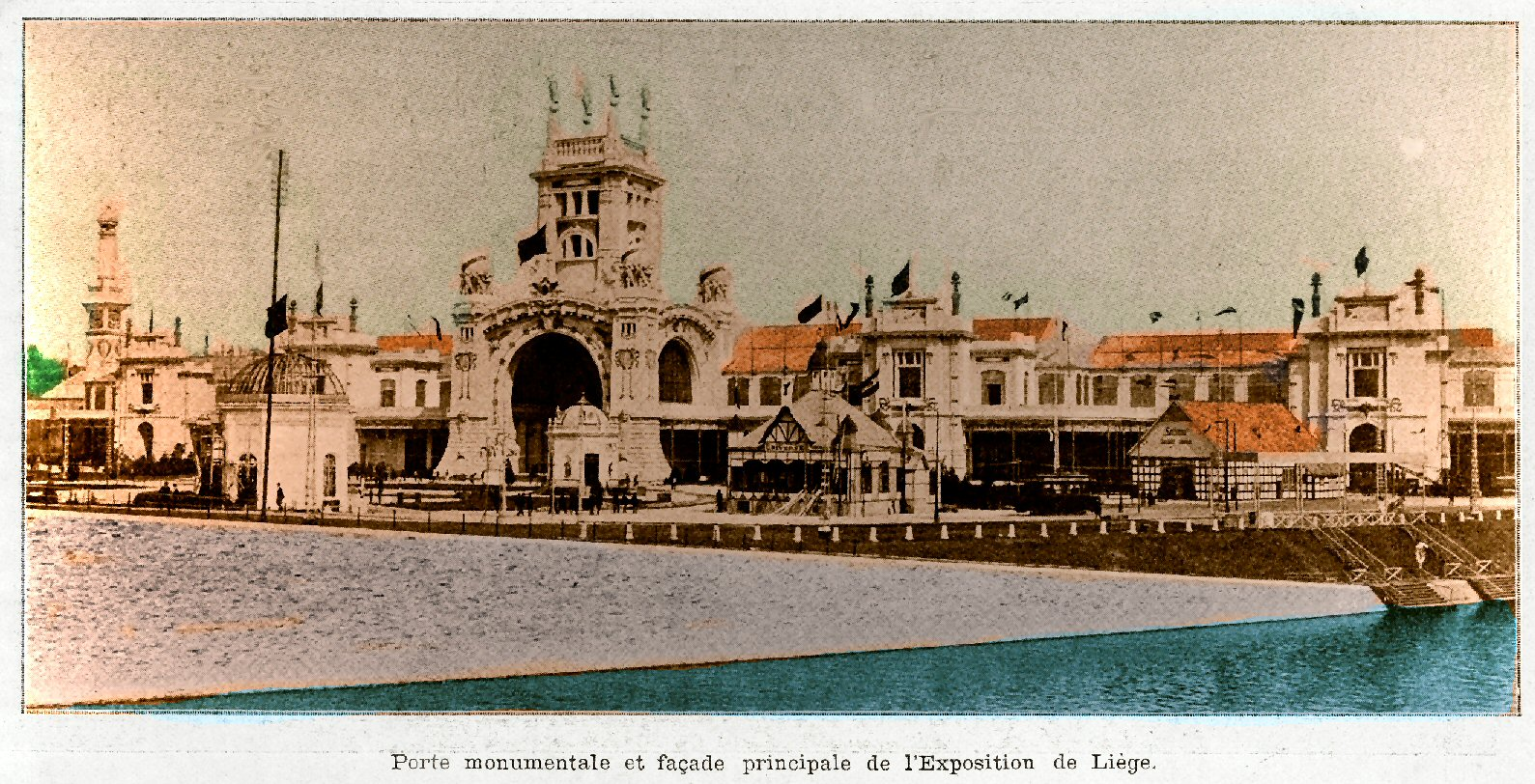
Principal façade of the Liège International Exposition of 1905

Twenty-nine countries were official participants, from Europe: Austria-Hungary, Bulgaria, Denmark, France, Greece, Germany, Italy, Luxembourg, Montenegro, Norway, Netherlands, Portugal, Romania, Russia, Serbia, Sweden, Switzerland, and the United Kingdom; from Africa: Egypt and Congo Free State; from America: Argentina, Brazil, Canada, Cuba, and the United States; and from Asia China, Japan, Persia and Turkey. Germany and Spain were unofficial participants.

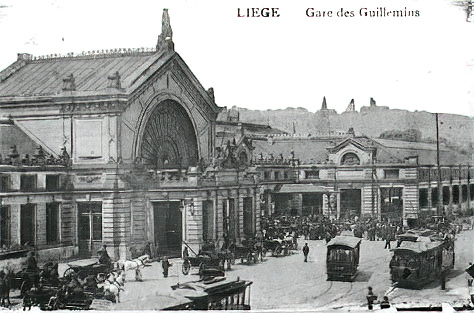
Liège-Guillemins railway station as it appeared in 1905 following improvements for the fair

There was an exhibition of medieval and Renaissance art, L'art ancien au Pays de Liège, as part of the event. Ulrikke Greve' Nordenfjeldske Kunstindustrimuseums Vævskole contributed tapestries which won a gold prize.

== Legacy ==
The Palais des Beaux Arts building was left to the city, and housed the Musee d'Art Moderne et d'Art Contemporaine. After closing in 2013, in May 2016 it reopened, with a contemporary glass extension, as La Boverie.

== Music ==
A piece by Jean-Théodore Radoux entitled Cantate pour l'inauguration de l'Exposition universelle de Liège, 1905, with words by Jules Sauvenière, was written for the expo.

== See also ==
- Colonial exhibition
- The Walloon Movement
