= Paul de Smet de Naeyer =

Belgian politician

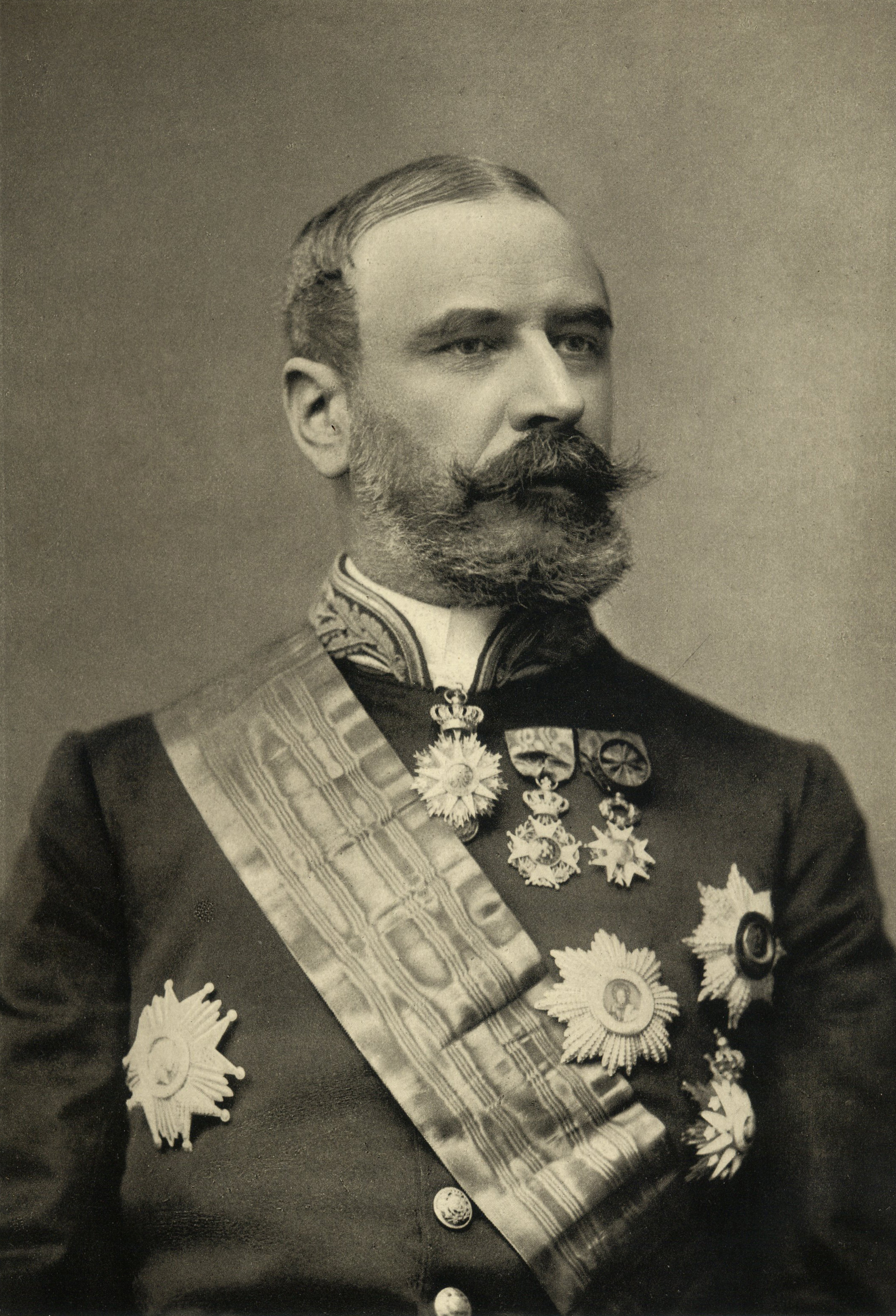

Prime Minister of Belgium
- In office 5 August 1899 – 2 May 1907
- Monarch: Leopold II
- Preceded by: Jules Vandenpeereboom
- Succeeded by: Jules de Trooz
- In office 25 February 1896 – 24 January 1899
- Monarch: Leopold II
- Preceded by: Jules de Burlet
- Succeeded by: Jules Vandenpeereboom

Personal details
- Born: 13 May 1843 Ghent, Belgium
- Died: 9 September 1913 (aged 70) Brussels, Belgium
- Party: Catholic Party

Paul Joseph, Count de Smet de Naeyer (13 May 1843 – 9 September 1913) was a Belgian Catholic Party politician who served as Prime Minister of Belgium from 1896 to January 1899 and again from August 1899 to 1907.

Born in Ghent, son of a cotton industrialist, he was himself also an industrialist and a banker. He was head of the Société Générale de Belgique and the owner of several coal mines.

He represented Ghent and Eeklo in the Belgian Chamber of Representatives from 1886 to 1908, and served in the Belgian Senate from 1908 to 1913. He served in several governments, as Minister of Finance from 1894 to 1896, and again from 1899 to 1907, combining the portfolio with the Ministry of Public Works. He was the prime minister of Belgium from 1896 to 1899, and again from 1899 to 1907. He was a strong supporter and personal friend of Leopold II of Belgium, blocking efforts to investigate atrocities in the Congo Free State. He was also a proponent of annexing the state in 1900, prior to it becoming Belgian Congo.

== Honours ==
Coat of arms of de Smet de Naeyer

National

- Belgium:
  - 1899: Minister of State, by Royal Decree.
  - 1900: Created Count de Smet de Naeyer, by Royal Decree.
  - Grand Cordon in the Order of Leopold
  - Knight Grand Cross in the Order of the African Star

Foreign

- France: Knight Grand Cross in the Legion of Honour
- Japan: Knight Grand Cross in the Imperial Order of the Rising Sun
- Greece: Knight Grand Cross in the Order of the Redeemer
- Holy See: Knight Grand Cross in the Order of Pius IX
- Knight Grand Cross in the Order of the White Eagle
- Knight Grand Cross in the Order of the Bavarian Crown
- Prussia: Knight Grand Cross in the Order of the Red Eagle

Political offices
Preceded by Jules de Burlet	Prime Minister of Belgium; 1896–1899	Succeeded by Jules Vandenpeereboom
Preceded by Jules Vandenpeereboom	Prime Minister of Belgium; 1899–1907	Succeeded by Jules de Trooz
