= Order of the White Eagle =

The Order of the White Eagle may refer to:

- Order of the White Eagle (Poland)
- Order of the White Eagle (Russian Empire)
- Order of the White Eagle (Serbia)

== See also ==
- Order of the Eagle (disambiguation)
