= Palais des beaux-arts de Liège =

Coordinates: 50.6275°N 5.5775°E

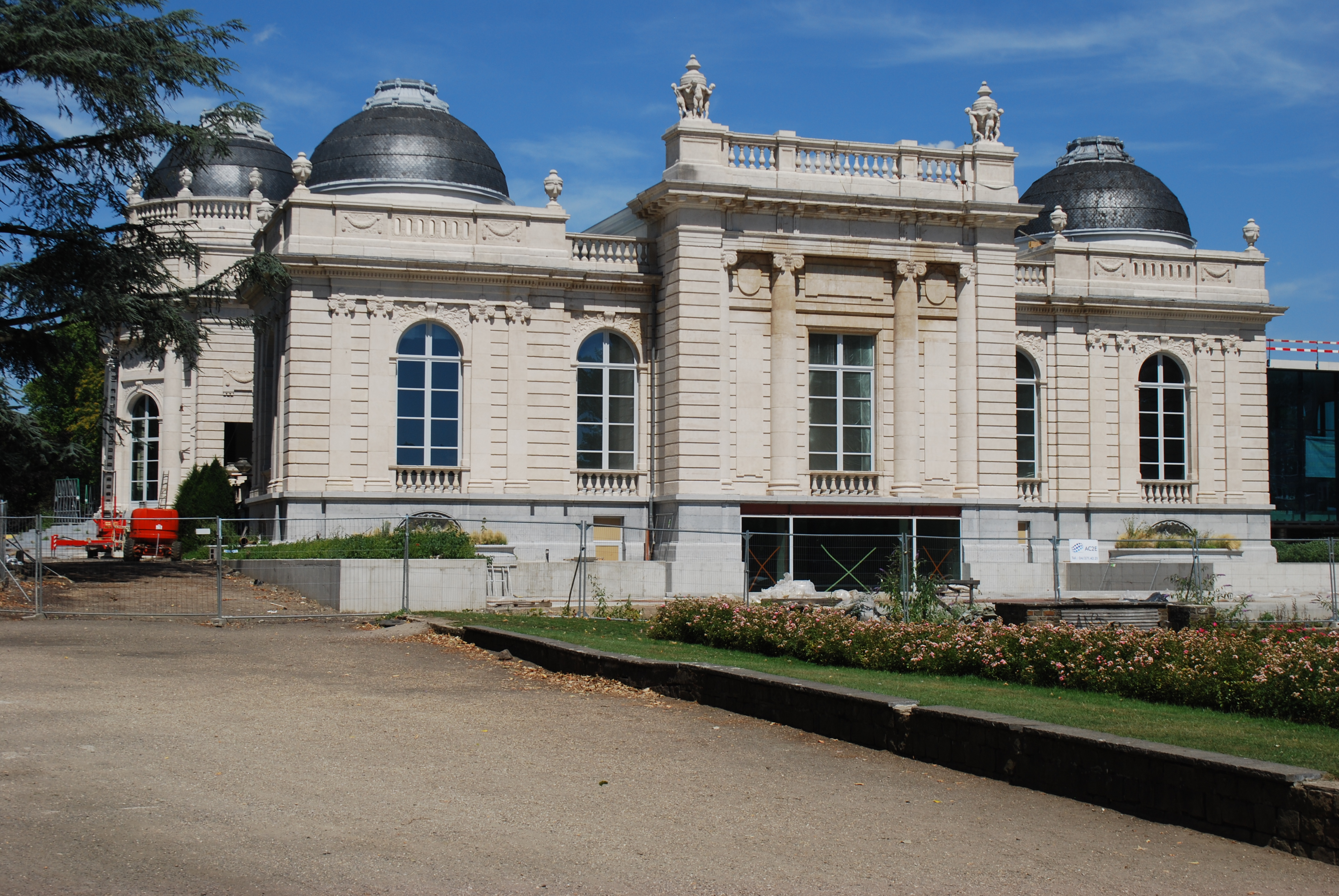
The Palais

The Palais des Beaux-Arts de Liège is a building at the centre of the Parc de la Boverie in the Belgian city of Liège. It was designed by Charles Étienne Soubre and Jean-Laurent Hasse and is the only building constructed for the Liège International in 1905 which was not demolished at the end of the event. The event's organising committee left it to the city and it became the 'Palais des Fêtes et des Expositions', hosting conferences, balls, banquets, salons and major exhibitions such as the exhibition on the COBRA movement in 1951.

The city's prints and drawings collection and the Walloon artistic collection from the city's Musée des Beaux-Arts were both housed in the building from 1952 onwards. The Musée des Beaux-Arts' main site in an annexe of the Académie Royale des Beaux-Arts de Liège on rue des Anglais was destroyed in the 1970s and so all its modern and contemporary art collections were moved into the Palais, which was renamed the Musée d'art moderne. The Walloon art was moved out in 1980 to a complex in the Féronstrée et Hors-Château district designed by Henri Bonhomme.

The Palais underwent a major renovation from 1988 onwards, reinstating the open space from the original 1905 design. It reopened in 1993 as the Musée d'art moderne et d'art contemporain (MAMAC). At the end of 2011 the musée des beaux-arts was revived in the Bonhomme building as part of a plan to combine MAMAC, the 'Fonds ancien' collection, the prints and drawings and the museum of Walloon art into a single entity named Musée des Beaux-Arts de Liège or BAL (Beaux-Arts Liège), housed in the former Walloon art galleries. On 28 February 2016 the Musée des Beaux-Arts closed and the whole collection was moved to a new museum housed in the Palais, named La Boverie.
