= La Boverie =

Coordinates: 50.6275°N 5.5775°E

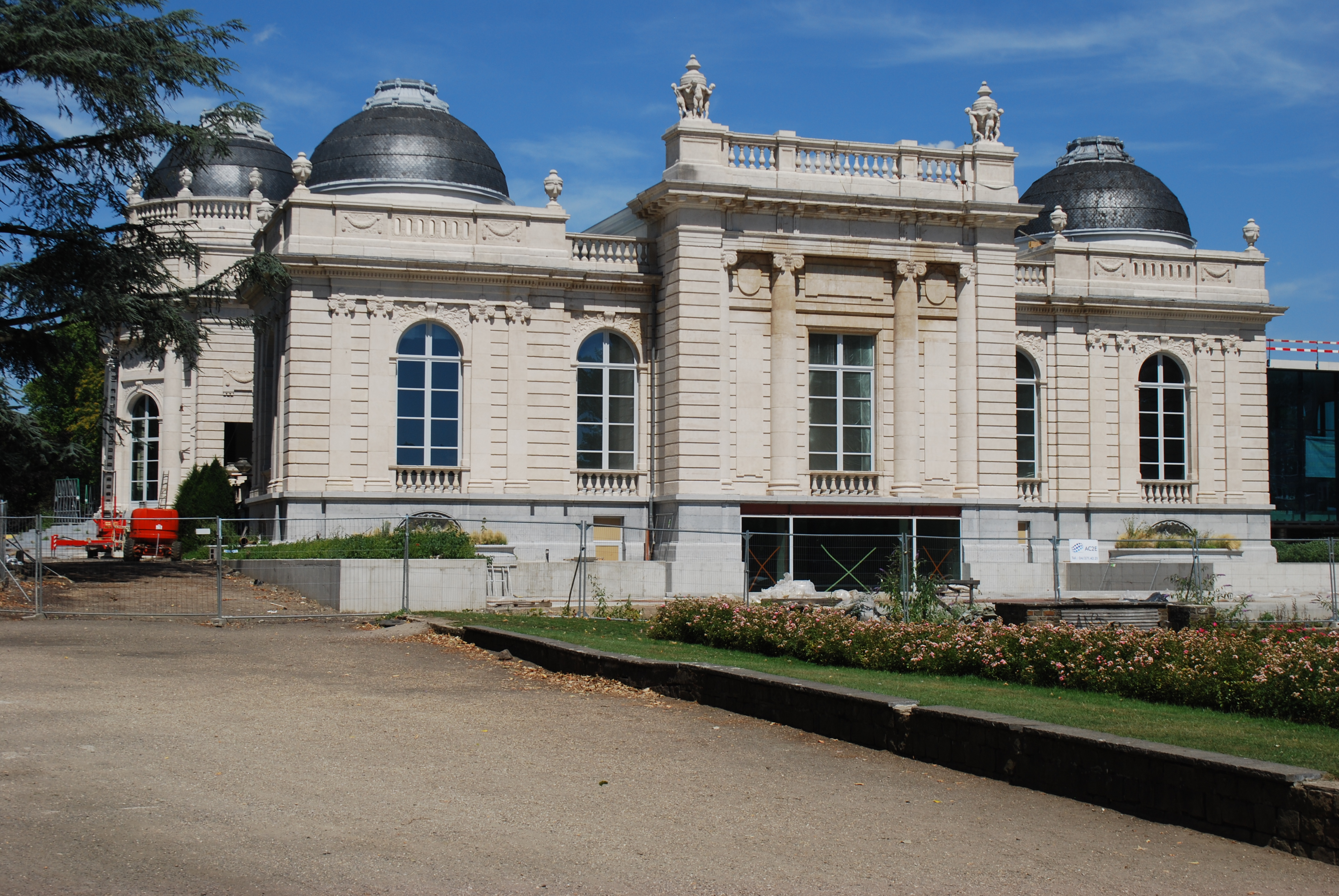
- Former name: Palais des beaux-arts de Liège
- Established: May 2016
- Type: Art museum
- Website: www.laboverie.com

La Boverie (French pronunciation: [la bɔvʁi]) is a museum in the city of Liège in Belgium. It opened in May 2016. It is housed in the former Palais des beaux-arts de Liège, built in the Parc de la Boverie for the Liège International in 1905. The building previously housed the prints and drawings collections (1952-1980) of the city's Musée des Beaux-Arts and the Walloon art collections of the city's Académie royale des beaux-arts (1970s-1980), before becoming the Musée d'art moderne (later known as the Musée d'art moderne et d'art contemporain or MMAC) from 1980 to 2011. MMAC was merged with the prints, drawings and Walloon collections in 2011 to form a new single collection known as the 'musée des Beaux-Arts'.

A part of the building is now under construction.

== Sources ==
- https://www.laboverie.com/
