= Jules de Trooz =

Belgian politician (1857–1907)

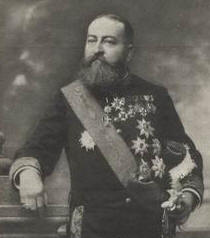

Prime Minister of Belgium
- In office 2 May 1907 – 31 December 1907
- Monarch: Leopold II
- Preceded by: Paul de Smet de Naeyer
- Succeeded by: Frans Schollaert

Personal details
- Born: 21 February 1857 Leuven, Belgium
- Died: 31 December 1907 (aged 50) Brussels, Belgium
- Party: Catholic Party

Jules Henri Ghislain Marie, Baron de Trooz (French pronunciation: [ʒyl ɑ̃ʁi ɡilɛ̃ maʁi baʁɔ̃ də tʁo]; 21 February 1857 – 31 December 1907) was a Belgian Catholic Party politician.

De Trooz was born in Leuven, and had studied philosophy before entering politics. He represented Leuven in the Belgian Chamber of People's Representatives from 1899 onwards, serving as Education and Interior minister. In 1907 he became the prime minister of Belgium, retaining the Interior portfolio. He had been prime minister for less than eight months when he died on the last day of 1907.

De Trooz was the second Belgian prime minister to die in office, after Barthélémy de Theux de Meylandt.

== Honours ==
- Belgium: Minister of State by Royal Decree.
- Belgium: Knight Order of Leopold
- Greece: Knight Grand Cross in the Order of the Redeemer
- Holy See: Knight Commander in the Order of Saint Sylvester Pope
- Holy See: Knight in the Order of Pope Pius IX
- Holy See: Pro Ecclesia et Pontifice
- Knight Grand Cross in the Order of the Red Eagle
- Knight Grand Cross in the Order of the Double Dragon
- Knight Grand Cross in the Order of the Lion and the Sun

Political offices
Preceded by Paul de Smet de Naeyer	Prime Minister of Belgium; 1907	Succeeded by Frans Schollaert
