= Leopold II of Belgium =

King of the Belgians from 1865 to 1909

Leopold II
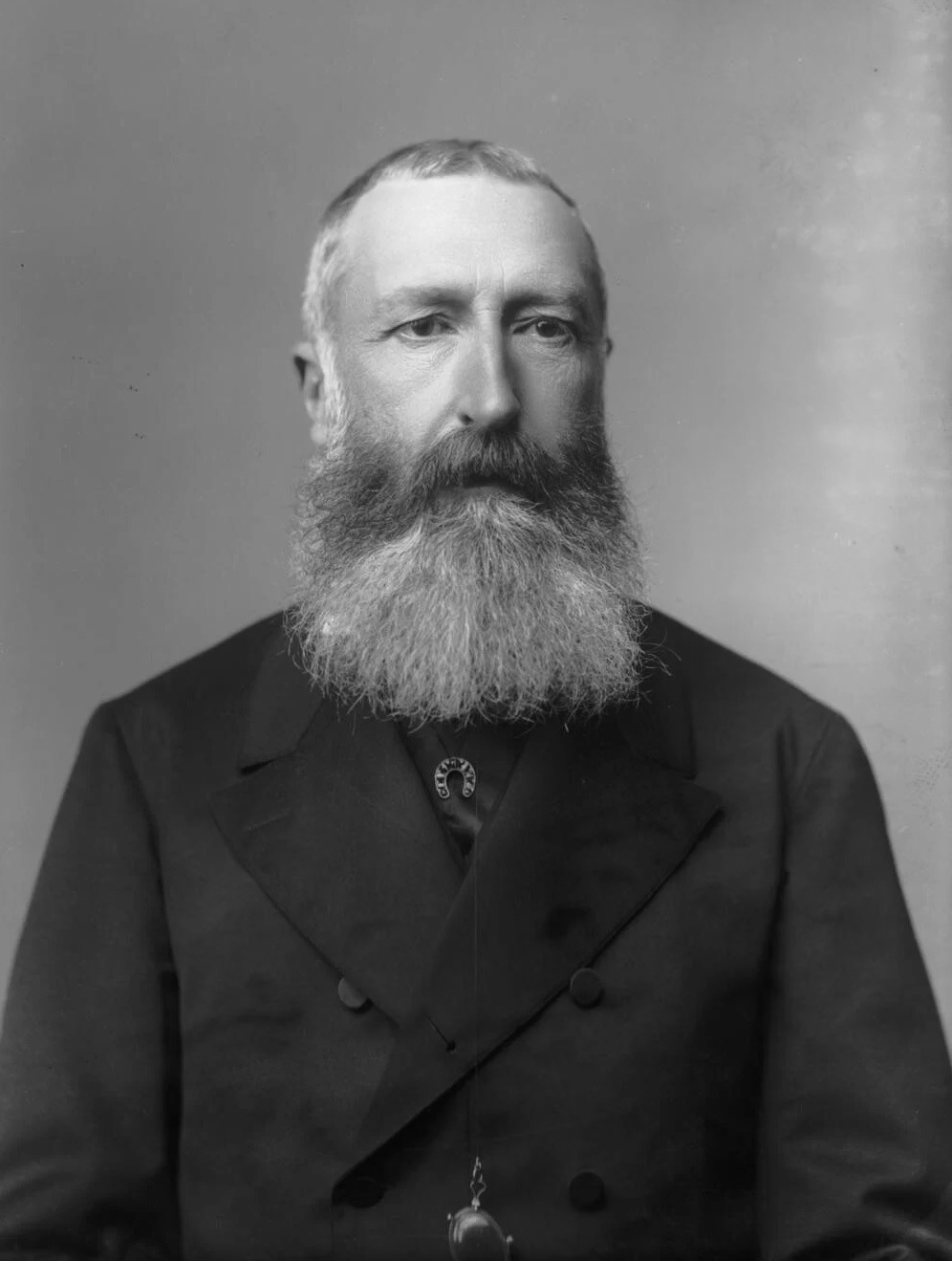
- Leopold in 1889

King of the Belgians
- Reign: 17 December 1865 – 17 December 1909
- Predecessor: Leopold I
- Successor: Albert I
- Prime ministers: See list: Charles Rogier; Walthère Frère-Orban; Baron d'Anethan; Chevalier de Theux de Meylandt; Jules Malou; Auguste Beernaert; Jules de Burlet; Paul de Smet de Naeyer; Jules Vandenpeereboom; Paul de Smet de Naeyer; Jules de Trooz; François Schollaert

Sovereign of the Congo Free State
- Reign: 1 July 1885 – 15 November 1908
- Governors-general: See list: Théophile Wahis; Camille Janssen; Francis de Winton
- Born: 9 April 1835; Brussels, Belgium
- Died: 17 December 1909 (aged 74); Laeken, Brussels, Belgium
- Burial: Church of Our Lady of Laeken
- Spouses: Marie Henriette of Austria (m. 1853; died 1902) Caroline Lacroix (disputed) (m. 1909)
- Issue Detail: Louise, Princess Philipp of Saxe-Coburg and Gotha; Prince Leopold, Duke of Brabant; Stéphanie, Crown Princess of Austria; Clémentine, Princess Napoléon; Lucien, Duke of Tervuren; Philippe, Count of Ravenstein
Names
- Dutch: Leopold Lodewijk Filips Maria Victor; French: Léopold Louis Philippe Marie Victor; German: Leopold Ludwig Philipp Maria Viktor; English: Leopold Louis Philip Mary Victor
- House: Saxe-Coburg and Gotha
- Father: Leopold I of Belgium
- Mother: Louise of Orléans

Leopold II (Note: Leopold Louis Philip Mary Victor; French: Léopold Louis Philippe Marie Victor; Dutch: Leopold Lodewijk Filips Maria Victor.) (9 April 1835 – 17 December 1909) was the second king of the Belgians from 1865 to 1909 as well as sovereign of the Congo Free State from 1885 to 1908.

Born in Brussels as the second but eldest-surviving son of King Leopold I and Queen Louise, Leopold succeeded his father to the Belgian throne in 1865 and reigned for 44 years until his death, the longest reign of a Belgian monarch to date. He died without surviving legitimate sons; the current king of the Belgians, Philippe, descends from his nephew and successor, Albert I. He is popularly referred to as the Builder King (Note: Dutch: Koning-Bouwheer, French: Roi-Bâtisseur) in Belgium in reference to the great number of buildings, urban projects and public works he commissioned.

Leopold was the founder and sole owner of the Congo Free State, a private colonial project undertaken on his own behalf as a personal union with Belgium. He used Henry Morton Stanley to help him lay claim to the Congo, the present-day Democratic Republic of the Congo. At the Berlin Conference of 1884–1885, the colonial nations of Europe authorised his claim and committed the Congo Free State to him. Leopold ran the Congo, which he never personally visited, by using the mercenary Force Publique for his personal gain. He extracted a fortune from the territory, initially by the collection of ivory and, after a rise in the price of rubber in the 1890s, by forced labour from the Indigenous population to harvest and process rubber.

Leopold's administration was characterised by systematic brutality and atrocities in the Congo Free State, including forced labour, torture, murder, kidnapping, along with the amputation of the hands and sometimes feet of men, women, and children when the quota of rubber was not met. In one of the first uses of the term, George Washington Williams described the practices of Leopold's administration of the Congo Free State as "crimes against humanity" in 1890.

While it has proven difficult to accurately estimate the pre-colonial population and the extent to which it changed under the Congo Free State, estimates for the Congolese population decline during Leopold's rule range from 1 million to 15 million. The causes of the decline included epidemic disease, a reduced birth rate, and violence and famine caused by the regime. He was widely condemned because of his brutal and oppressive regime in the Congo that resulted in widespread suffering and loss of life including exploitation, violence, and immense human rights abuses, particularly involving the rubber trade.

== Early life ==
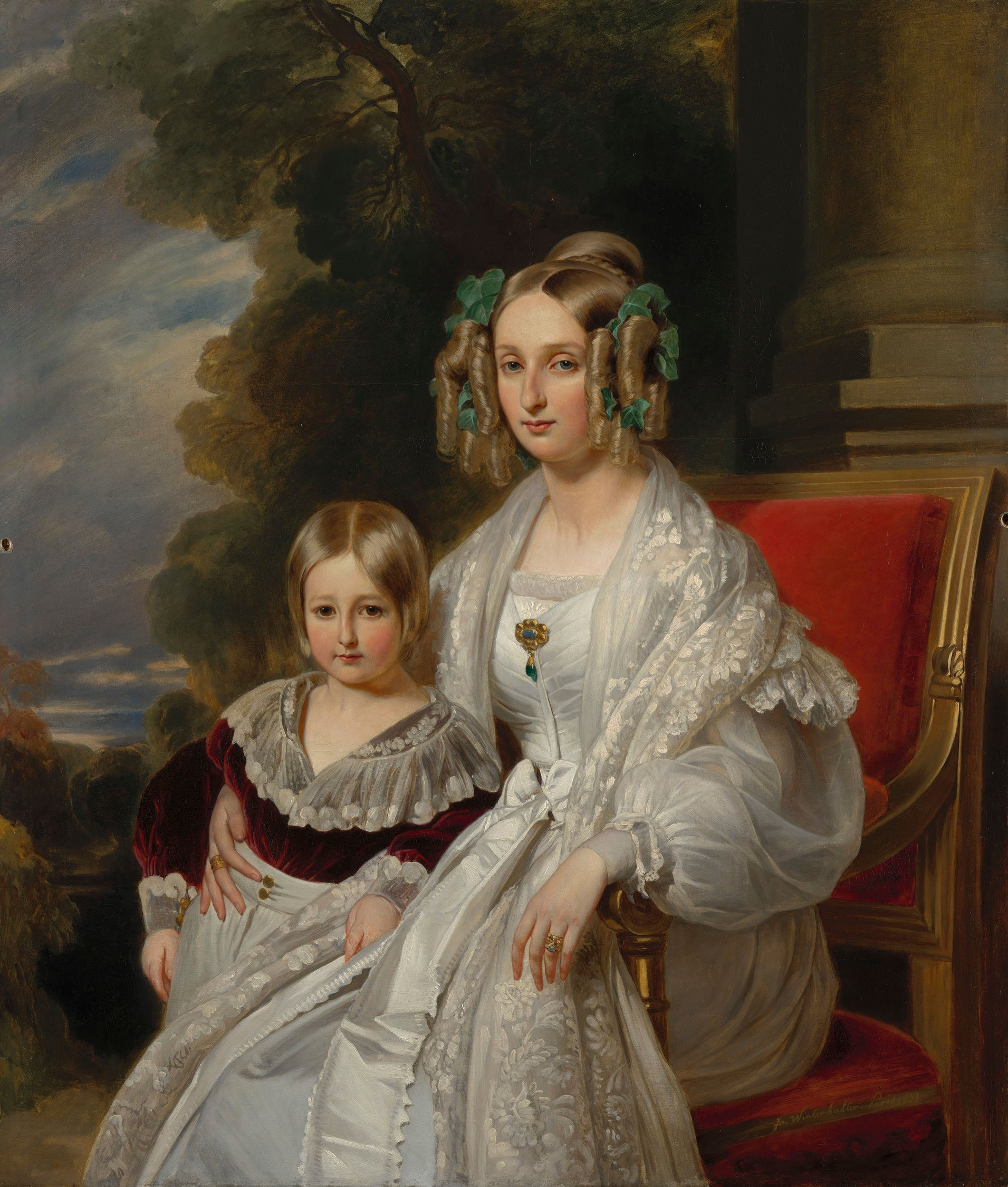
Queen Louise of Orléans with her son Prince Leopold, later Leopold II. Painting by Franz Xaver Winterhalter (1838)

Leopold was born in Brussels on 9 April 1835, the second child of the reigning Belgian monarch, Leopold I, and of his second wife, Louise, the daughter of King Louis Philippe of France. His eldest brother, Louis Philippe, Crown Prince of Belgium, died in infancy in 1834. As heir apparent, Leopold was granted the title of Duke of Brabant in 1840. The French Revolution of 1848 forced his maternal grandfather, Louis Philippe, to flee to the United Kingdom. Louis Philippe died two years later, in 1850. Leopold's fragile mother was deeply affected by the death of her father and her health deteriorated. She died of tuberculosis the same year, when Leopold was 15 years old.

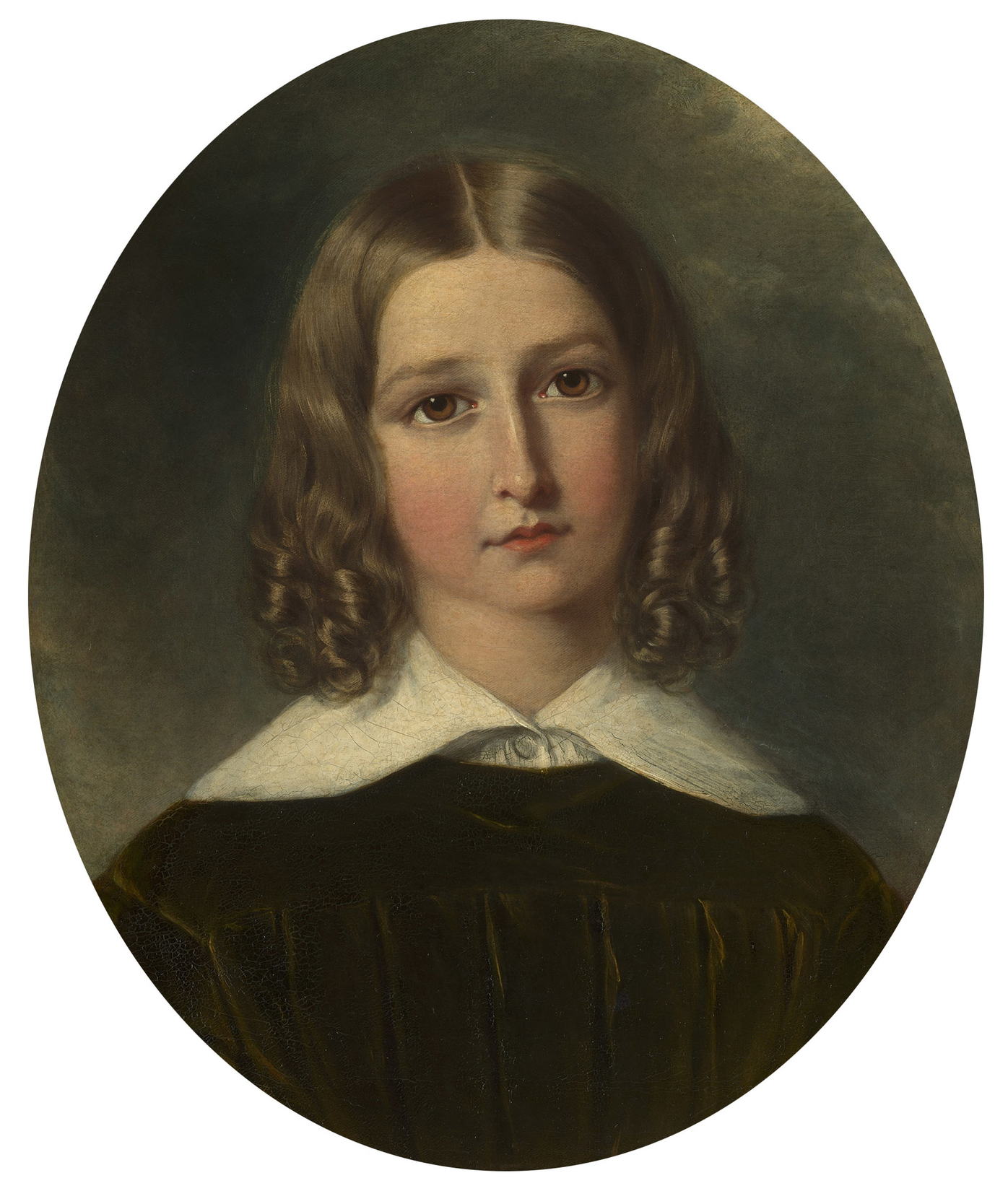
Young Prince Leopold by John Partridge (1841)

Leopold's sister Charlotte became Empress Carlota of Mexico in 1864. The British monarch at the time, Queen Victoria, was Leopold II's first cousin, as was Victoria's husband, Prince Albert, since Leopold's father, Albert's father, Duke Ernest I of Saxe-Coburg-Gotha, and Victoria's mother, the then Duchess of Kent, were all siblings. As a young man, Leopold II served in the Belgian military and achieved the rank of lieutenant-general. He also served in the Belgian Senate at the time.

== Marriage and family ==
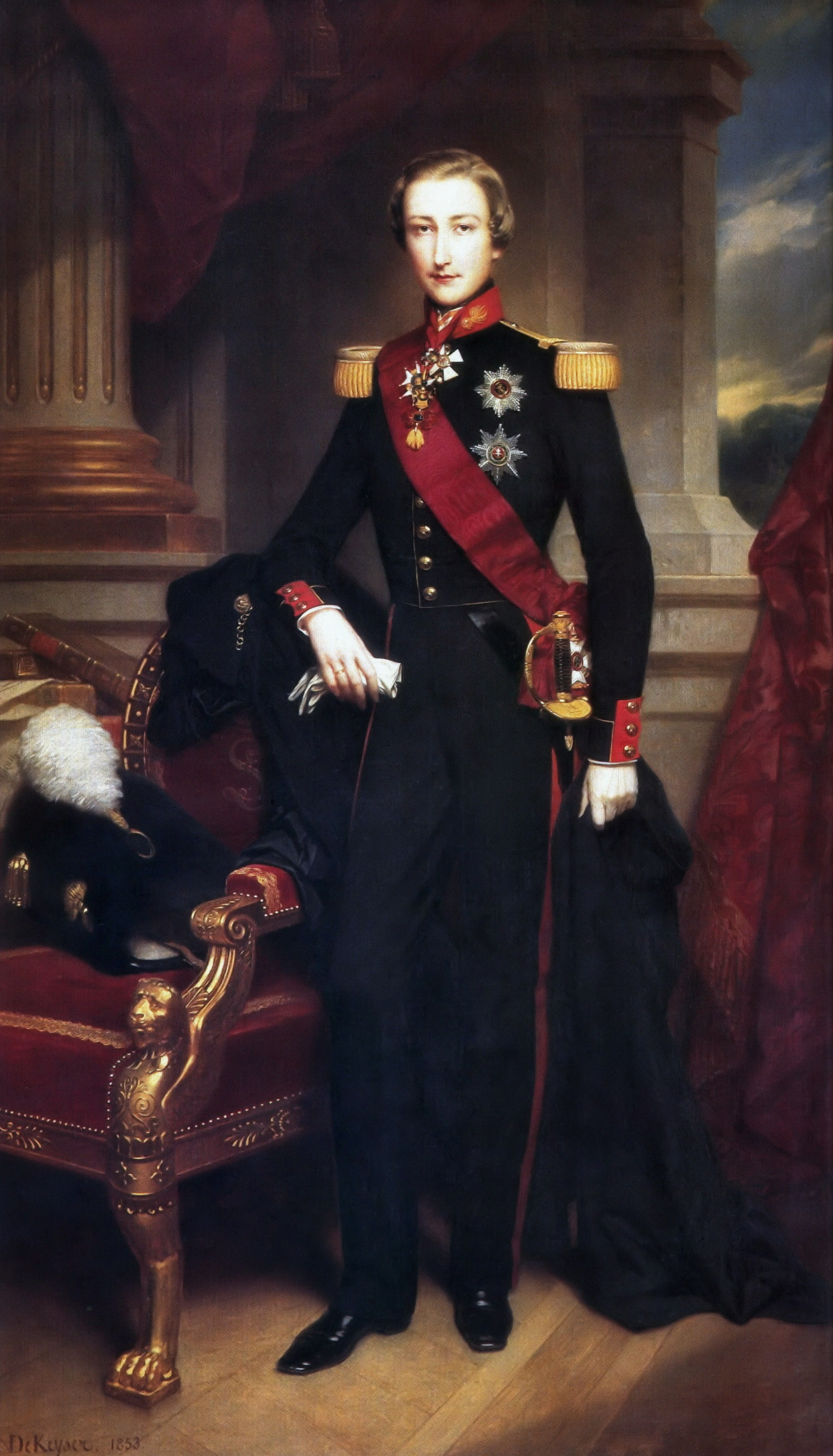
Leopold as a younger man in the uniform of the Grenadiers (Portrait by Nicaise de Keyser)

At the age of 18, Leopold married Marie Henriette of Austria, a cousin of Emperor Franz Joseph I of Austria and granddaughter of the late Holy Roman Emperor Leopold II, on 22 August 1853 in Brussels. Lively and energetic, Marie Henriette endeared herself to the people by her character and benevolence. Her beauty earned her the sobriquet "The Rose of Brabant". She was also an accomplished artist and musician. She was passionate about horse riding, to the point that she would care for her horses personally. Some joked about this "marriage of a stableman and a nun", the latter referring to the shy and withdrawn Leopold. The marriage produced four children: three daughters and one son, Prince Leopold, Duke of Brabant. The younger Leopold died in 1869 at the age of nine from pneumonia after falling into a pond. His death was a source of great sorrow for King Leopold. The marriage became unhappy, and the couple separated after a last attempt to have another son, a union that resulted in the birth of their last daughter, Clementine. Marie Henriette retreated to Spa in 1895, and died there in 1902.

Leopold had many mistresses. In 1899, in his 65th year, Leopold took as a mistress Caroline Lacroix, a 16-year-old French prostitute, and they remained together until his death ten years later. Leopold lavished upon her large sums of money, estates, gifts, and a noble title, Baroness de Vaughan. Owing to these gifts and the unofficial nature of their relationship, their affair ironically lost Leopold more popularity in Belgium than any of his crimes in the Congo. Caroline bore two sons, Lucien Philippe Marie Antoine, Duke of Tervuren, and Philippe Henri Marie François, Count of Ravenstein. Their second son was born with a deformed hand, leading a cartoon to depict Leopold holding the child surrounded by Congolese corpses with their hands sliced off: the caption said "Vengeance from on high". They married secretly in a religious ceremony five days before his death. Their failure to perform a civil ceremony rendered the marriage invalid under Belgian law. After the king's death, it soon emerged that he had left his widow a large fortune in Congo securities, only some of which the Belgian government and Leopold's three estranged daughters were able to win back.

== Early political career ==
As Leopold's older brother, the earlier crown prince Louis Philippe, had died the year before Leopold's birth, Leopold was heir to the throne from his birth. When he was 5 years old, Leopold received the title of Duke of Brabant, and was appointed a sub-lieutenant in the army. He served in the army until his accession in 1865, by which time he had reached the rank of lieutenant-general.

Leopold's public career began on his attaining the age of majority in 1855, when he became a member of the Belgian Senate. He took an active interest in the senate, especially in matters concerning the development of Belgium and its trade, and began to urge Belgium's acquisition of colonies. Leopold travelled abroad extensively from 1854 to 1865, visiting India, China, Egypt, and the countries on the Mediterranean coast of Africa. His father died on 10 December 1865, and Leopold took the oath of office on 17 December, at the age of 30. He also served in the Belgian Senate during this time.

== Domestic reign ==
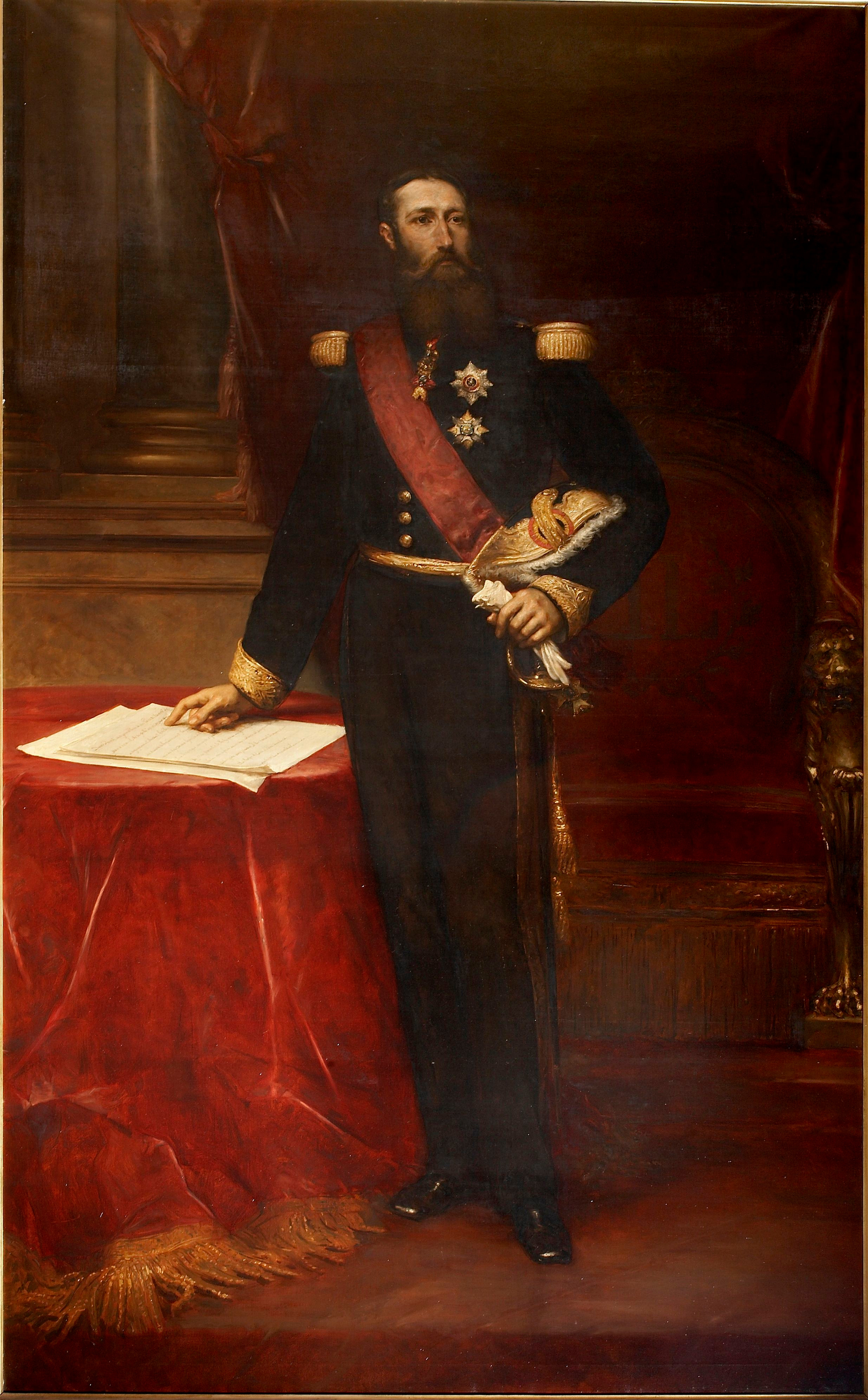
Leopold II in 1875. Portrait by Louis Gallait

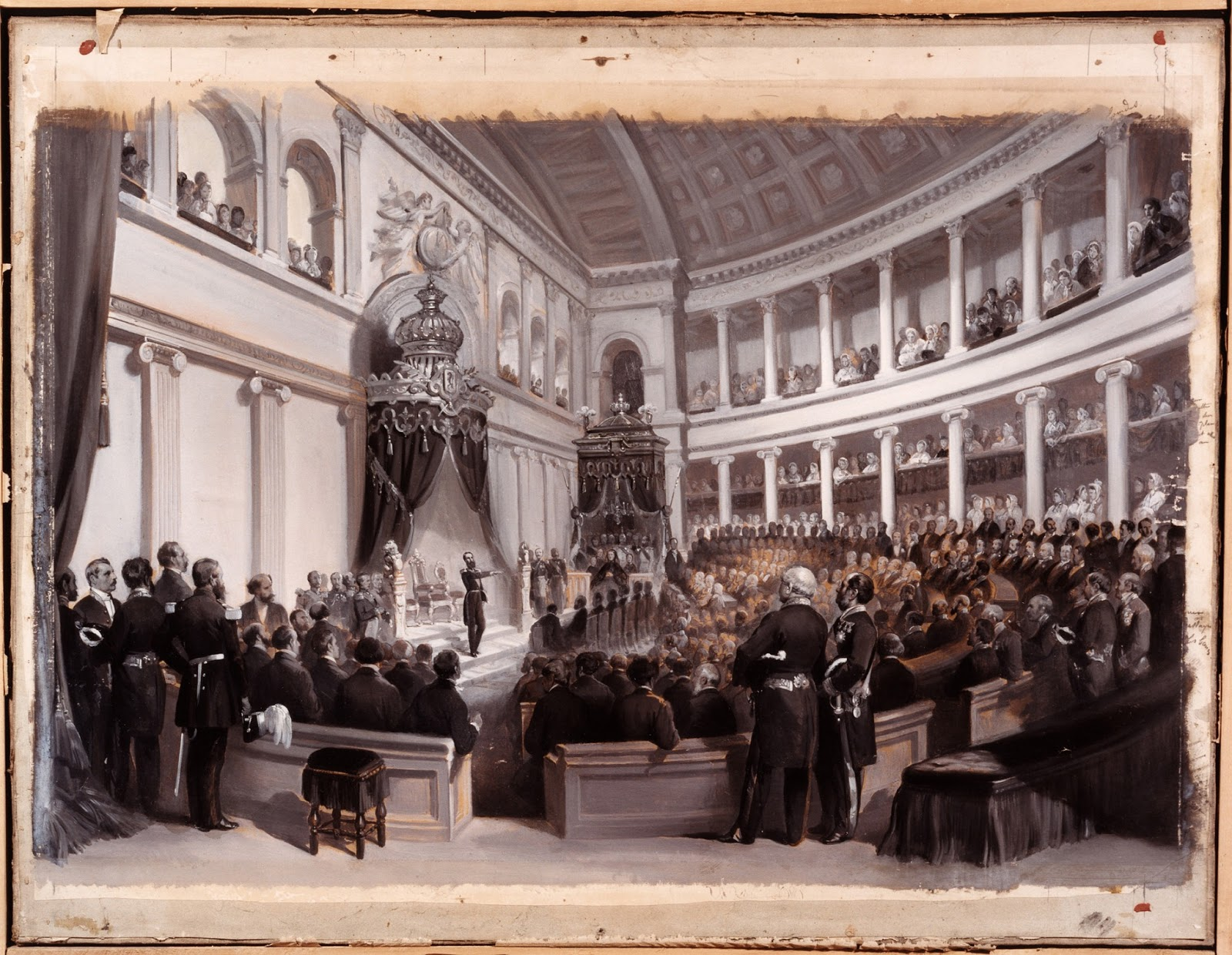
Leopold II at his accession to the throne

Leopold became king in 1865. He explained his goal for his reign in an 1888 letter addressed to his brother, Prince Philippe, Count of Flanders: "the country must be strong, prosperous, therefore have colonies of her own, beautiful and calm."

Leopold's reign was marked by a number of major political developments. The Liberals governed Belgium from 1857 to 1880, and during its final year in power legislated the Frère-Orban Law of 1879. This law created free, secular, compulsory primary schools supported by the state and withdrew all state support from Roman Catholic primary schools. The Catholic Party obtained a parliamentary majority in 1880, and four years later restored state support to Catholic schools. In 1885, various socialist and social democratic groups drew together and formed the Labour Party. Increasing social unrest and the rise of the Labour Party forced the adoption of universal male suffrage in 1893.

During Leopold's reign other social changes were enacted into law. Among these were the right of workers to form labour unions and the abolition of the livret d'ouvrier, an employment record book. Laws against child labour were passed. Children younger than 12 were not allowed to work in factories, children younger than 16 were not allowed to work at night, and women younger than 21 years old were not allowed to work underground. Workers gained the right to be compensated for workplace accidents and were given Sundays off.

Leopold's reluctance to use the Dutch language in public did little to solve the linguistic conflict in Belgium and made him more unpopular than his father with the Flemish Movement. However, his nephew and heir, Prince Baudouin, became something of a hero to the Flemings, and Leopold did make some speeches in Dutch shortly before and after Baudouin's premature death in 1891.

The first revision of the Belgian Constitution came in 1893. Universal male suffrage was introduced, though the effect of this was tempered by plural voting. The eligibility requirements for the Senate were reduced, and elections would be based on a system of proportional representation, which continues to this day. Leopold pushed strongly to enable a royal referendum, whereby the king would have the power to consult the electorate directly on an issue, and use his veto according to the results of the referendum. The proposal was rejected, as it would have given the king the power to override the elected government. Leopold was so disappointed that he considered abdication.

Leopold emphasised military defence as the basis of neutrality, and strove to make Belgium less vulnerable militarily. He achieved the construction of defensive fortresses at Liège, at Namur and at Antwerp. During the Franco-Prussian War, he managed to preserve Belgium's neutrality in a period of unusual difficulty and danger. Leopold pushed for a reform in military service, but he was unable to obtain one until he was on his deathbed. The Belgian army was a combination of volunteers and a lottery, and it was possible for men to pay for substitutes for service. This was replaced by a system in which one son in every family would have to serve in the military. According to historian Jean Stengers, Leopold II's imperialism was driven by economic advantage rather than political grandeur. Leopold sought to maximise profit through efficient exploitation, including forced labour and direct revenue. However, Stengers emphasises that Leopold's voracity was not solely for personal enrichment; it was also rooted in patriotism—a desire to ensure Belgium's prosperity and embellishment.

=== Builder King ===
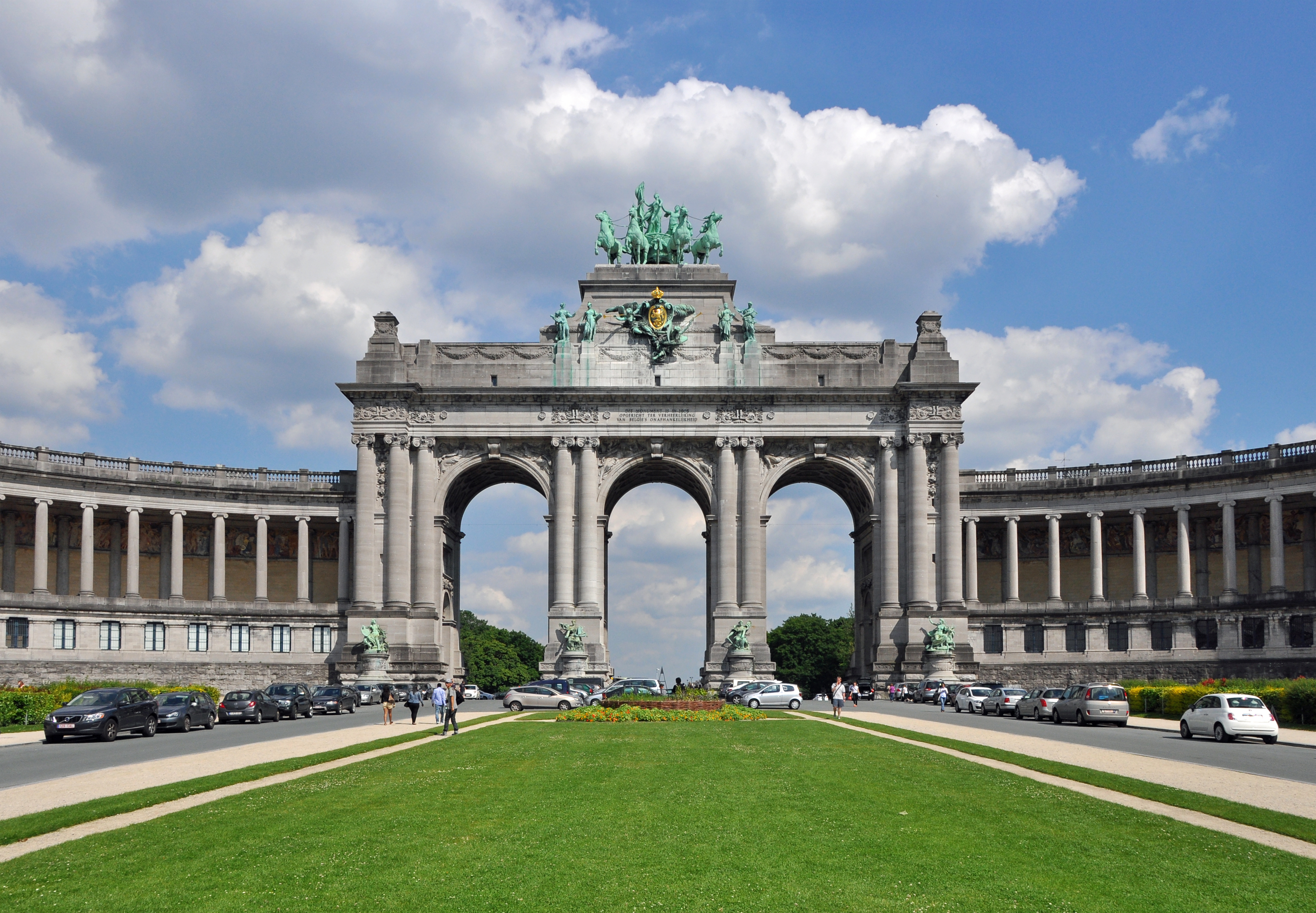
The Cinquantenaire/Jubelpark memorial arcade and museums in Brussels, commissioned by Leopold II

Leopold commissioned a great number of buildings, urban projects and public works. According to the historians Wm. Roger Louis and Adam Hochschild, this was largely possible thanks to the profits generated from the Congo Free State, though this is disputed. These projects earned him the epithet of "Builder King" (Dutch: Koning-Bouwheer, French: Roi-Bâtisseur). The public buildings were mainly in Brussels, Ostend, Tervuren and Antwerp, and include the Parc du Cinquantenaire/Jubelpark (1852–1880), memorial arcade and complex, the Basilica of the Sacred Heart (1905–1969) and Duden Park in Brussels (1881); the Hippodrome Wellington racetrack (1883), the Royal Galleries and Maria Hendrikapark in Ostend (1902); the Royal Museum for Central Africa and its surrounding park in Tervuren (1898); and Antwerpen-Centraal railway station in Antwerp (1895–1905).

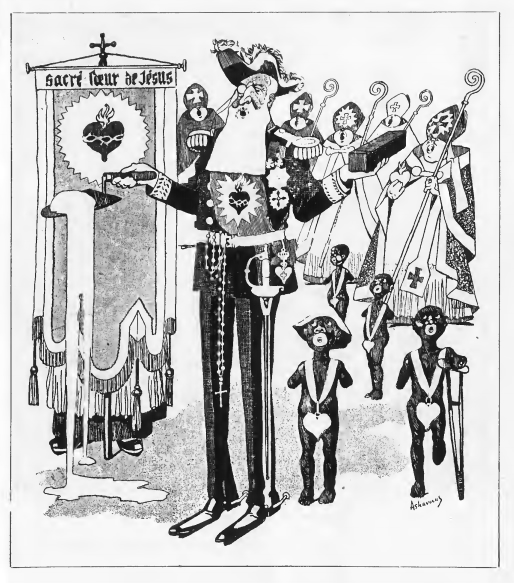
Cartoon depicting Leopold II laying the first stone of the Basilica of the Sacred Heart in Brussels

In addition to his public works, Leopold acquired and built numerous private properties for himself inside and outside Belgium. He expanded the grounds of the Royal Castle of Laeken, and built the Royal Greenhouses, as well as the Japanese Tower and the Chinese Pavilion near the palace (now the Museums of the Far East). In the Ardennes, his domains consisted of 6,700 hectares (17,000 acres) of forests and agricultural lands and the châteaux of Ardenne, Ciergnon, Fenffe, Villers-sur-Lesse and Ferage. He also built important country estates on the French Riviera, including the Villa des Cèdres and its botanical garden, and the Villa Leopolda.

Thinking of the future after his death, Leopold did not want the collection of estates, lands and heritage buildings he had privately amassed to be scattered among his daughters, each of whom was married to a foreign prince. In 1900, he created the Royal Trust, by means of which he donated most of his properties to the Belgian nation in perpetuity, and arranged for the royal family to continue using them after his death.

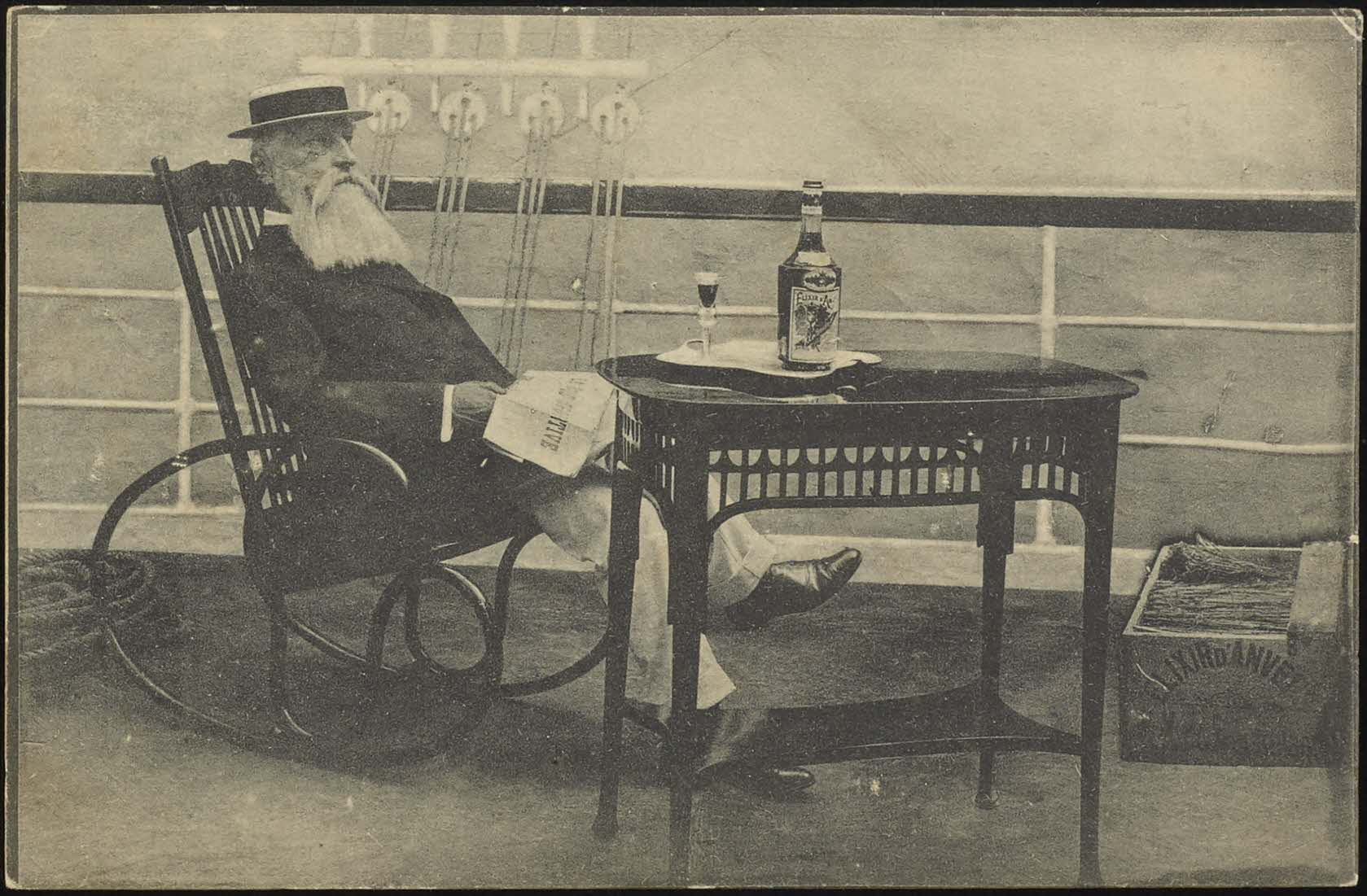
Postcard 'Elixir d'Anvers, Balsam' Leopold II voor De Beukelaer, Antwerp, JM.08.0012.00, Jenevermuseum Hasselt

=== Attempted assassination ===
On 15 November 1902, Italian anarchist Gennaro Rubino attempted to assassinate Leopold, who was riding in a royal cortege from a ceremony at the Church of St. Michael and St. Gudula (now Brussels' cathedral) in memory of his recently deceased wife, Marie Henriette. After Leopold's carriage passed, Rubino fired three shots at the procession. The shots missed the king but almost killed his grand marshal, Count Charles John d'Oultremont. Rubino was immediately arrested and subsequently sentenced to life imprisonment; he died in prison in 1918.

Belgians rejoiced that the king was safe: later in the day, in the Royal Theatre of La Monnaie before Tristan und Isolde was performed, the orchestra played The Brabançonne, which was sung loudly and ended with loud cheers and applause. Heads of state and the pope sent telegrams to the king congratulating him for surviving the assassination attempt. After the attack, Leopold replied to a senator: "My dear senator, if fate wants me shot, too bad! (Mon cher Sénateur, si la fatalité veut que je sois atteint, tant pis!).

== Congo Free State ==
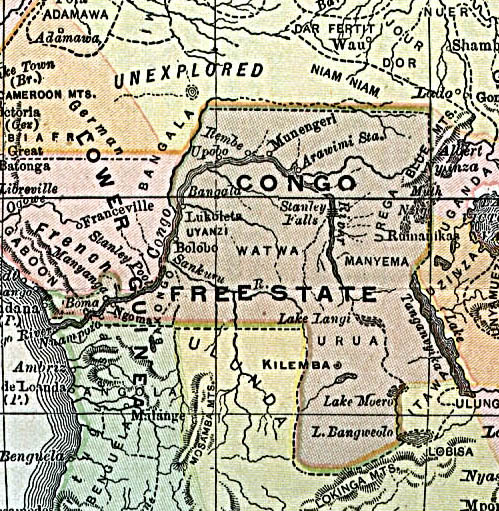
Map of the Congo Free State, c. 1890

Leopold was the founder and sole owner of the Congo Free State, a private project undertaken on his own behalf. He used explorer Henry Morton Stanley to help him lay claim to the Congo, an area now known as the Democratic Republic of the Congo. At the Berlin Conference of 1884–1885, the colonial nations of Europe authorised his claim by committing the Congo Free State to improving the lives of the people. The central services of the state were located in Brussels. All officials within the Congo were Belgian, including those in administration, the army, and the courts. Belgian officers from the army played an essential role in the Congo's governance. Even religious missions, especially Catholic ones, had a distinctly Belgian character.

Leopold extracted a fortune from the Congo, initially by the collection of ivory, and after a rise in the price of rubber in the 1890s, by forced labour from the people to harvest and process rubber. He ran the Congo using the mercenary Force Publique for his personal enrichment. Failure to meet rubber collection quotas was punishable by death. Meanwhile, the Force Publique were required to provide a hand of their victim as proof when they had shot and killed someone, as it was believed that they would otherwise use the munitions (imported from Europe at considerable cost) for hunting. As a consequence, the rubber quotas were in part paid off in chopped-off hands.

Shortly after the Brussels Anti-Slavery Conference (1889–1890), Leopold issued a new decree mandating that Africans in a large part of the Free State could sell their harvested products (mostly ivory and rubber) only to the state. This law extended an earlier decree declaring that all "unoccupied" land belonged to the state. Any ivory or rubber collected from the state-owned land, the reasoning went, must belong to the state, thus creating a de facto state-controlled monopoly. Therefore, a large share of the local population could sell only to the state, which could set prices and thereby control the income the Congolese could receive for their work. For local elites, however, this system presented new opportunities, as the Free State and concession companies paid them with guns to tax their subjects in kind.

Under his regime, millions of Congolese inhabitants, including children, were mutilated, killed or died from disease and famine. In addition, the birth rate rapidly declined during this period. Estimates for the total population decline range from 1 million to 15 million, with a consensus growing around 10 million. Several historians argue against this figure due to the absence of reliable censuses, the enormous mortality of diseases such as smallpox or sleeping sickness and the fact that there were only 175 administrative agents in charge of rubber exploitation.

Reports of deaths and abuse led to a major international scandal in the early 20th century, and Leopold was forced by the Belgian government to relinquish control of the colony to the civil administration in 1908.

=== Obtaining the Congo Free State ===
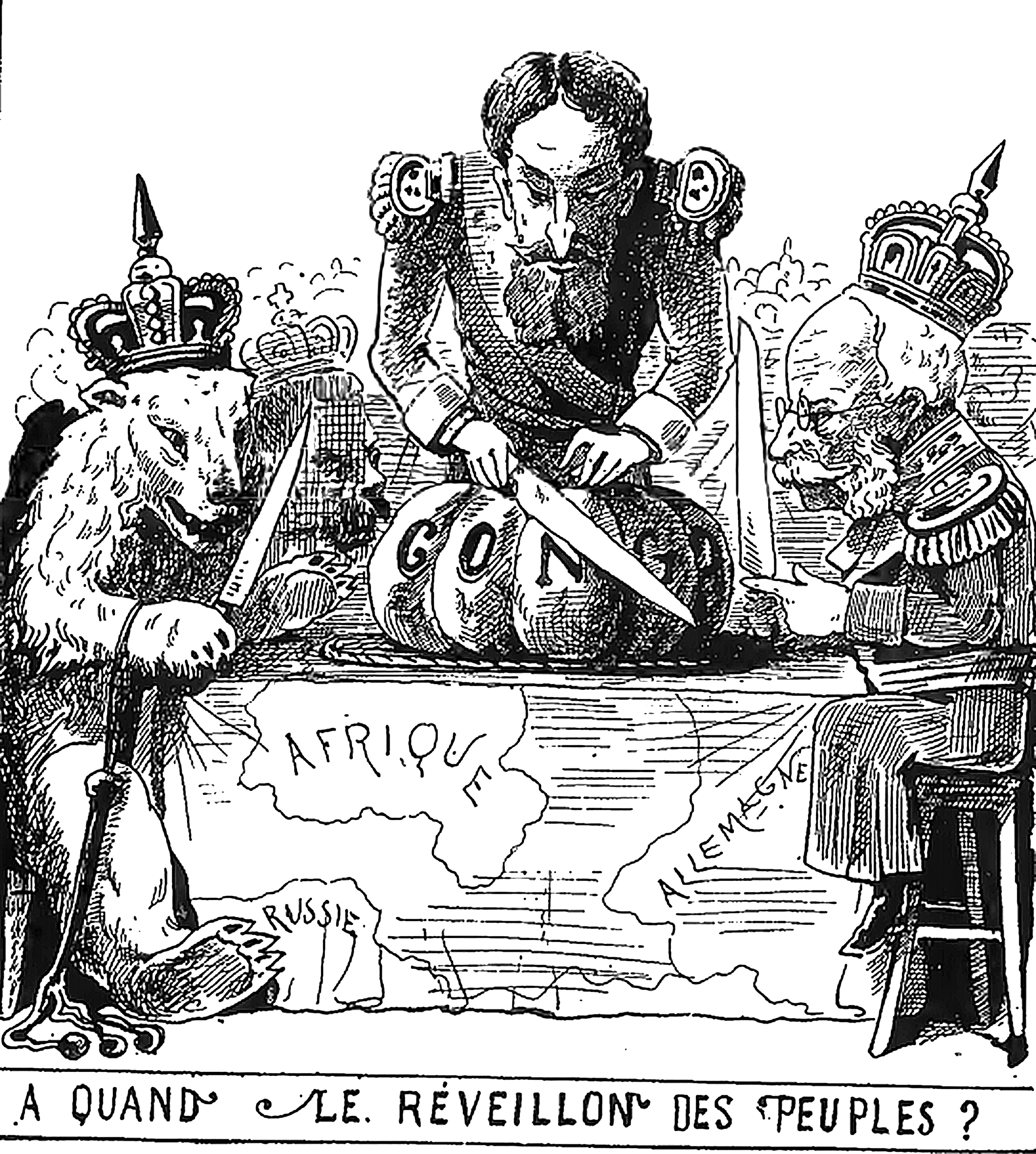
Cartoon depicting Leopold II and other imperial powers at the Berlin Conference of 1884

Leopold fervently believed that overseas colonies were the key to a country's greatness, and he worked tirelessly to acquire colonial territory for Belgium. He envisioned "our little Belgium" as the capital of a large overseas empire. Leopold eventually began to acquire a colony as a private citizen. The Belgian government lent him money for this venture.

During his reign, Leopold saw the empires of the Netherlands, Portugal, and Spain as being in a state of decline and expressed interest in buying their territories. In 1866, Leopold instructed the Belgian ambassador in Madrid to speak to Queen Isabella II of Spain about ceding the Philippines to Belgium, but the ambassador did nothing. Leopold quickly replaced the ambassador with a more sympathetic individual to carry out his plan. In 1868, when Isabella II was deposed as queen of Spain, Leopold tried to press his original plan to acquire the Philippines. But without funds, he was unsuccessful. Leopold then devised another unsuccessful plan to establish the Philippines as an independent state, which could then be ruled by a Belgian. When both of these plans failed, Leopold shifted his aspirations of colonisation to Africa.

After numerous unsuccessful schemes to acquire colonies in Africa and Asia, in 1876 Leopold organised a private holding company disguised as an international scientific and philanthropic association, which he called the International African Society, or the International Association for the Exploration and Civilization of the Congo. In 1878, under the auspices of the holding company, he hired explorer Henry Stanley to explore and establish a colony in the Congo region. Much diplomatic manoeuvring among European nations resulted in the Berlin Conference of 1884–1885 regarding African affairs, at which representatives of 14 European countries and the United States recognised Leopold as sovereign of most of the area to which he and Stanley had laid claim. On 5 February 1885, the Congo Free State, an area 76 times larger than Belgium, was established under Leopold II's personal rule and private army, the Force Publique.

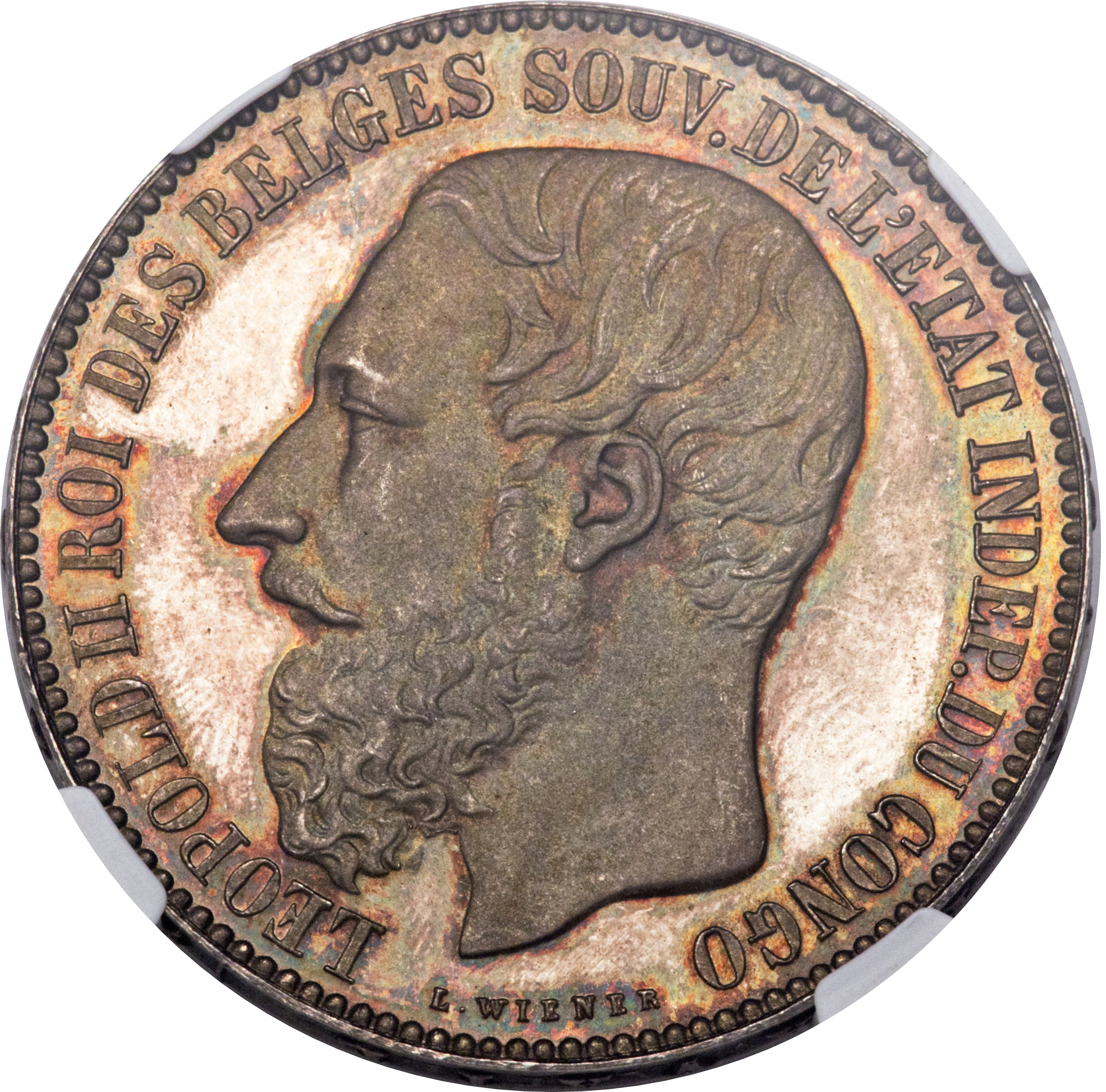
Leopold II's effigy on a Congo Free State 5 Franc, with the unabridged and translated lettering of "Leopold II, King of the Belgians, Sovereign of the Independent State of the Congo".

==== Lado Enclave ====
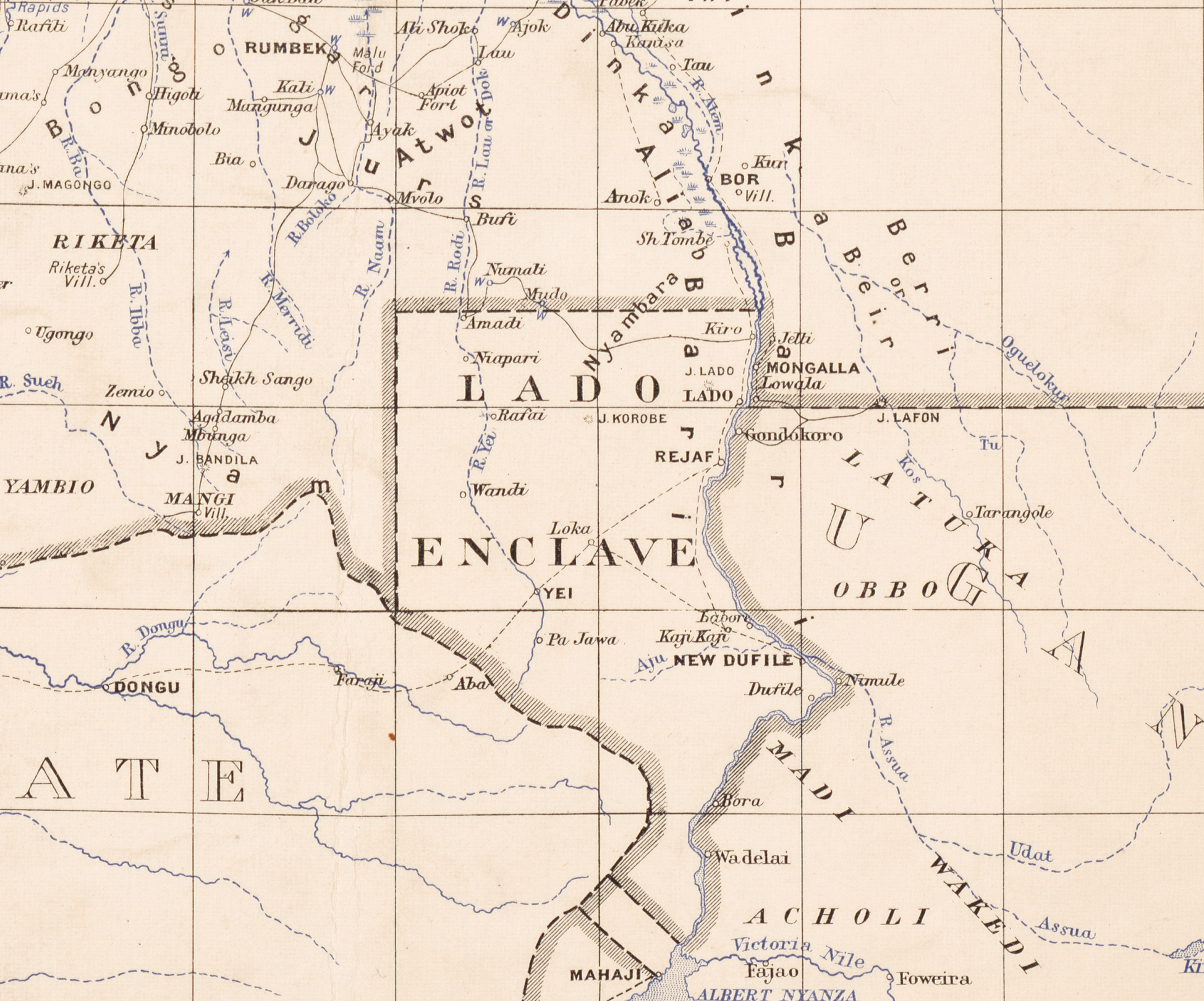
Map of the Lado Enclave in 1904

In 1894, King Leopold signed a treaty with the United Kingdom which conceded a strip of land on the Congo Free State's eastern border in exchange for a lifetime lease of the Lado Enclave, which provided access to the navigable Nile and extended the Free State's sphere of influence northwards into Sudan. After rubber profits soared in 1895, Leopold ordered the organisation of an expedition into the Lado Enclave, which had been overrun by Mahdist rebels since the outbreak of the Mahdist War in 1881. The expedition was composed of two columns: the first, under Belgian Baron Dhanis, consisted of a sizeable force, numbering around 3,000, and was to strike north through the jungle and attack the rebels at their base at Rejaf. The second, a much smaller force of 800, was led by Louis-Napoléon Chaltin and took the main road towards Rejaf. Both expeditions set out in December 1896.

Although Leopold had initially planned for the expedition to carry on much farther than the Lado Enclave, hoping indeed to take Fashoda and then Khartoum, Dhanis' column mutinied in February 1897, resulting in the death of several Belgian officers and the loss of his entire force. Nonetheless, Chaltin continued his advance, and on 17 February 1897, his outnumbered forces defeated the rebels in the Battle of Rejaf, securing the Lado Enclave as Free State territory until Leopold's death in 1909.

=== Exploitation, atrocities, and death toll ===
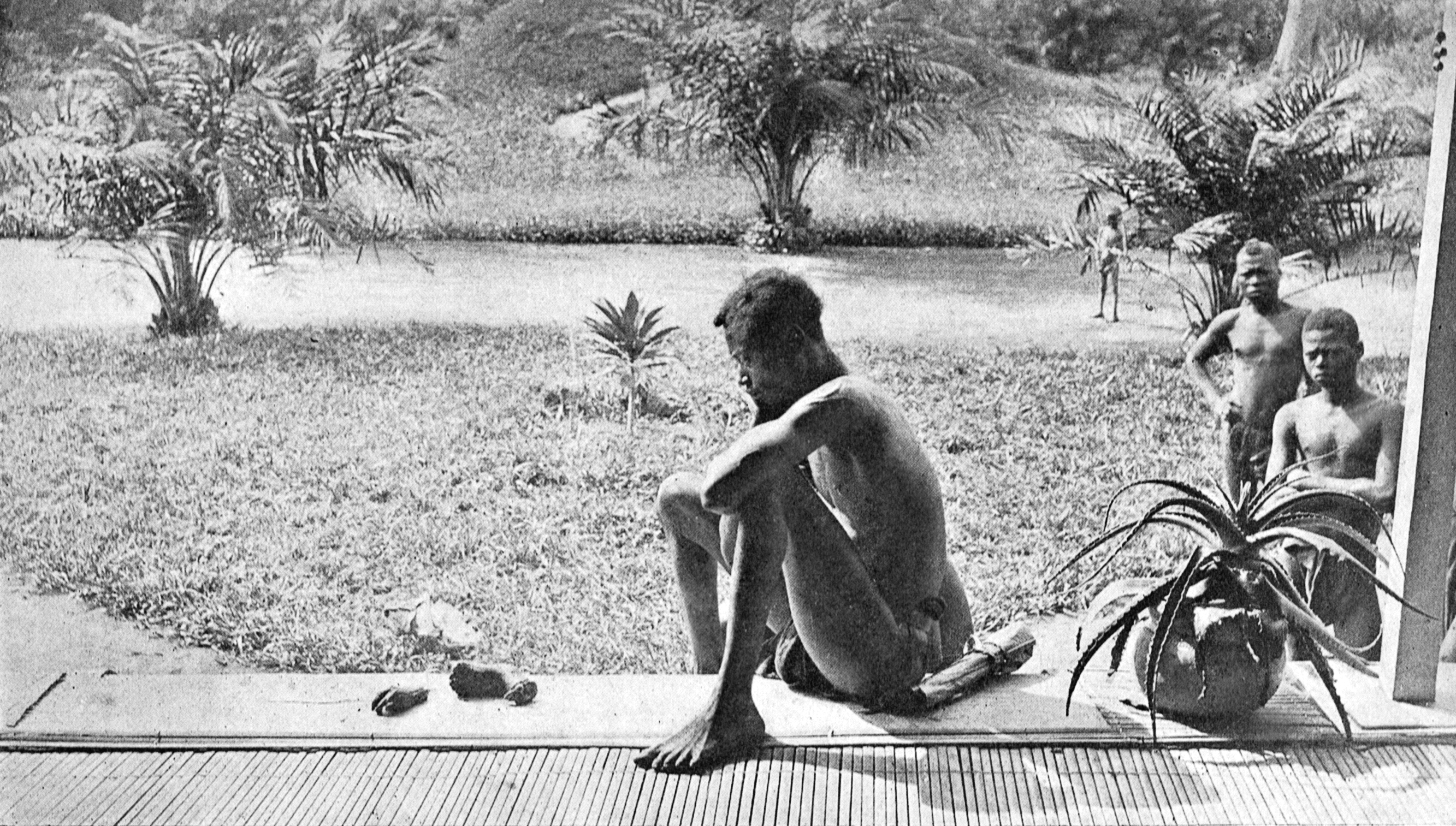
A Congolese man, Nsala, looking at the severed hand and foot of his five-year-old daughter who in 1904 was killed, cooked, and cannibalised by armed guards of a company holding a concession for rubber collection

Leopold amassed a huge personal fortune by exploiting the natural resources of the Congo. At first, ivory was exported, but this did not yield the expected levels of revenue. When the global demand for rubber exploded, attention shifted to the labour-intensive collection of sap from rubber plants. Abandoning the promises of the Berlin Conference in the late 1890s, the Free State government restricted foreign access and extorted forced labour from the locals. Abuses, especially in the collection of rubber, included forced labour of the Indigenous population, beatings, widespread killings, and frequent mutilation when production quotas were not met. One practice used to force workers to collect rubber included taking wives and family members hostage.

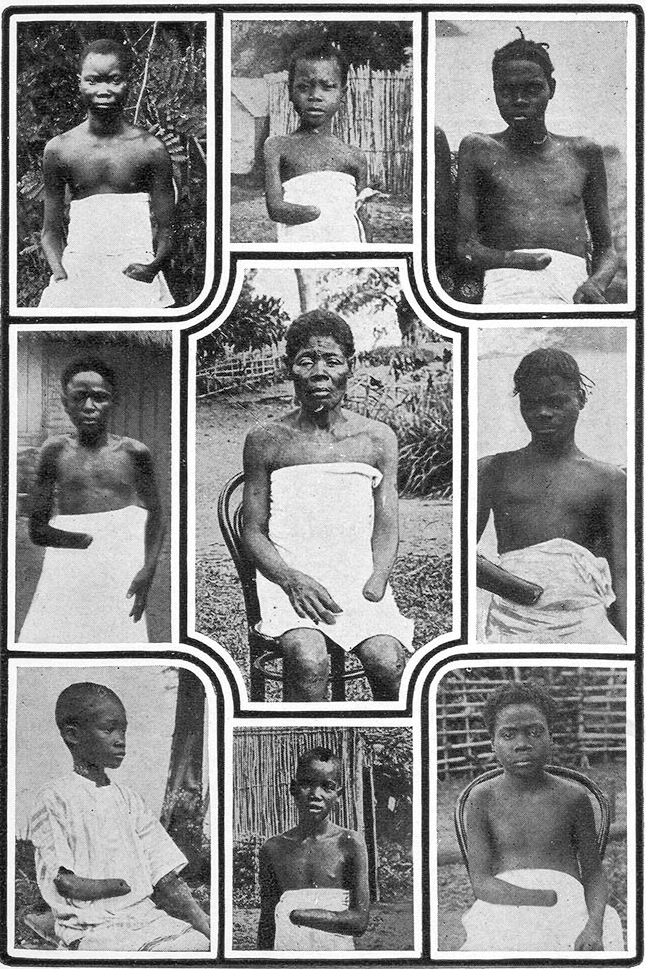
Mutilated Congolese children and adults

Missionary John Harris of Baringa was so shocked by what he had encountered that he wrote to Leopold's chief agent in the Congo, saying:

I have just returned from a journey inland to the village of Insongo Mboyo. The abject misery and utter abandon is positively indescribable. I was so moved, Your Excellency, by the people's stories that I took the liberty of promising them that in future you will only kill them for crimes they commit.

Estimates of the death toll range from one million to fifteen million, since accurate records were not kept. Historians Louis and Stengers in 1968 stated that population figures at the start of Leopold's control are only "wild guesses", and that attempts by E. D. Morel and others to determine a figure for the loss of population were "but figments of the imagination".

Adam Hochschild devotes a chapter of his 1998 book King Leopold's Ghost to the problem of estimating the death toll. He cites several recent lines of investigation, by anthropologist Jan Vansina and others, that examine local sources (police records, religious records, oral traditions, genealogies, personal diaries, and "many others"), which generally agree with the assessment of the 1919 Belgian government commission: roughly half the population were killed or died during the Free State period. Hochschild points out that since the first official census by the Belgian authorities in 1924 put the population at about 10 million, these various approaches suggest a rough estimate of a population decline by 10 million.

Smallpox epidemics and sleeping sickness also devastated the deeply traumatised population. By 1896, African trypanosomiasis had killed up to 5,000 people in the village of Lukolela on the Congo River. The mortality statistics were collected through the efforts of British consul Roger Casement, who found, for example, only 600 survivors of the disease in Lukolela in 1903. Economists Sara Lowes and Eduardo Montero found that King Leopold II's coercive labour practices for rubber extraction in the Congo Free State had long-lasting negative impacts. Ethnic groups subjected to more intensive rubber exploitation exhibited significantly lower economic development over a century later, driven by disruptions to traditional economic systems and human capital accumulation. Their work also examined how colonial co-option of local chiefs during the rubber era may have undermined leader accountability, linking to broader critiques of indirect rule strategies across Africa. They conclude that the oppressive policies under Leopold's personal rule led to lasting economic and political underdevelopment in the region.

=== Criticism of the management of Congo ===
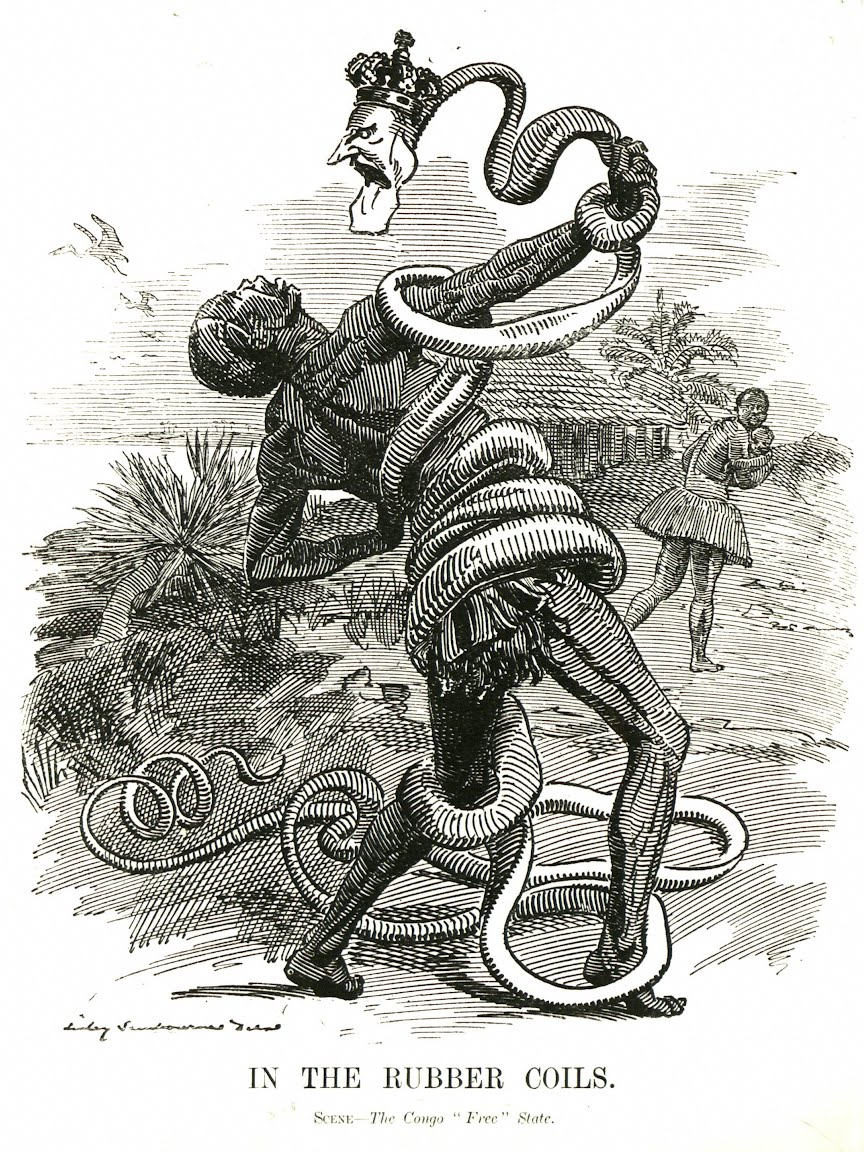
A 1906 Punch cartoon by Edward Linley Sambourne depicting Leopold II as a rubber snake entangling a Congolese rubber collector

Inspired by works such as Joseph Conrad's Heart of Darkness (1902), originally published as a three-part series in Blackwood's Magazine (1899) and based on Conrad's experience as a steamer captain on the Congo 12 years earlier, international criticism of Leopold's rule increased and mobilised. Reports of outrageous exploitation and widespread human rights abuses led the British Crown to appoint their consul Roger Casement to investigate conditions there. His extensive travels and interviews in the region resulted in the Casement Report, which detailed the extensive abuses under Leopold's regime. A widespread war of words ensued. In Britain, former shipping clerk E. D. Morel with Casement's support founded the Congo Reform Association, the first mass human rights movement. Supporters included American writer Mark Twain, whose stinging political satire entitled King Leopold's Soliloquy portrays the king arguing that bringing Christianity to the country outweighs a little starvation, and uses many of Leopold's own words against him.

Writer Arthur Conan Doyle also criticised the "rubber regime" in his 1908 work The Crime of the Congo, written to aid the work of the Congo Reform Association. Doyle contrasted Leopold's rule with British rule in Nigeria, arguing that decency required those who ruled primitive peoples to be concerned first with their uplift, not how much could be extracted from them. As Hochschild describes in King Leopold's Ghost, many of Leopold's policies, in particular those of colonial monopolies and forced labour, were influenced by Dutch practice in the East Indies. Similar methods of forced labour were employed to some degree by Germany, France, and Portugal where natural rubber occurred in their own colonies.

Efforts by Leopold to dampen international criticism of human rights abuses included the sponsoring of an author, May French Sheldon, by his British consule Sir Alfred Lewis Jones on an expedition of the Congo Free State in 1891. While in the Congo, she travelled on steamboats owned by the state and its company allies, who controlled where she went and what she saw. When she returned to England, Jones placed her articles in the newspapers. She stated "I have witnessed more atrocities in London streets than I have ever seen in the Congo." Thereafter, the king paid her a monthly salary to lobby members of Parliament.

=== Relinquishment of the Congo ===
King Leopold II and Princess Clémentine visit colonial celebrations in Antwerp on the occasion of the Congo's annexation to Belgium in 1909

International opposition and criticism at home from the Catholic Party, Progressive Liberals and the Labour Party caused the Belgian Parliament to compel the king to cede the Congo Free State to Belgium in 1908. The deal that led to the handover cost Belgium the considerable sum of 215.5 million Francs. This was used to discharge the debt of the Congo Free State and to pay out its bond holders as well as 45.5 million for Leopold's pet building projects in Belgium and a personal payment of 50 million to him. The Congo Free State was transformed into a Belgian colony under parliamentary control known as the Belgian Congo. Leopold went to great lengths to conceal potential evidence of wrongdoing during his time as ruler of his private colony. The entire archive of the Congo Free State was burned and he told his aide that even though the Congo had been taken from him, "they have no right to know what I did there".

When the Belgian government took over the administration in 1908, the situation in the Congo improved in certain respects. The brutal exploitation and arbitrary use of violence, in which some of the concessionary companies had excelled, were curbed. Article 3 of the new Colonial Charter of 18 October 1908 stated that: "Nobody can be forced to work on behalf of and for the profit of companies or privates", but this was not enforced, and the Belgian government continued to impose forced labour on the natives, albeit by less obvious methods. The Belgian Congo gained independence in 1960 and became known as the Republic of the Congo.

== Death and legacy ==
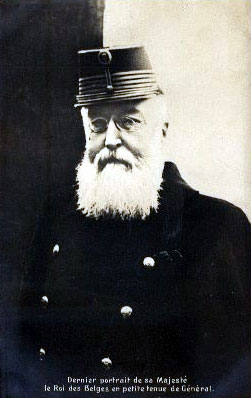
Last picture of Leopold II

On 17 December 1909, Leopold II died at Laeken from an embolism, and the Belgian crown passed to Albert I, the son of Leopold's brother, Philippe, Count of Flanders. His funeral cortege was booed by the crowd in expression of disapproval of his rule. Leopold's reign of exactly 44 years remains the longest in Belgian history. He was interred in the royal vault at the Church of Our Lady of Laeken.

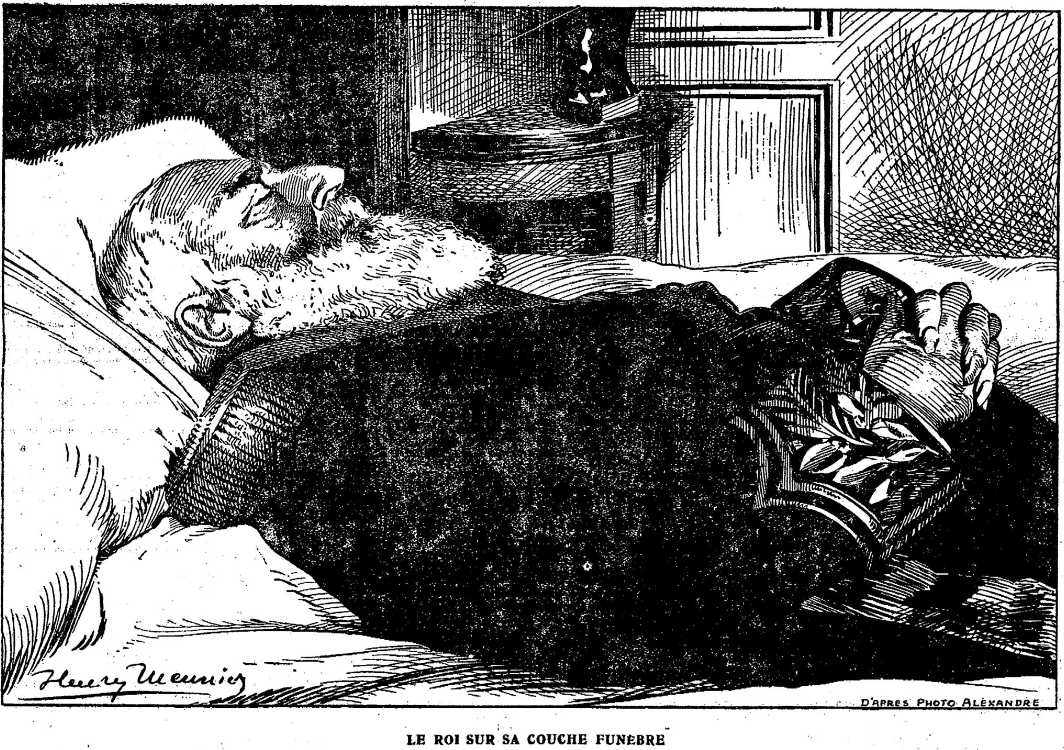
Drawing of Leopold II on his deathbed, published by the newspaper Le Soir

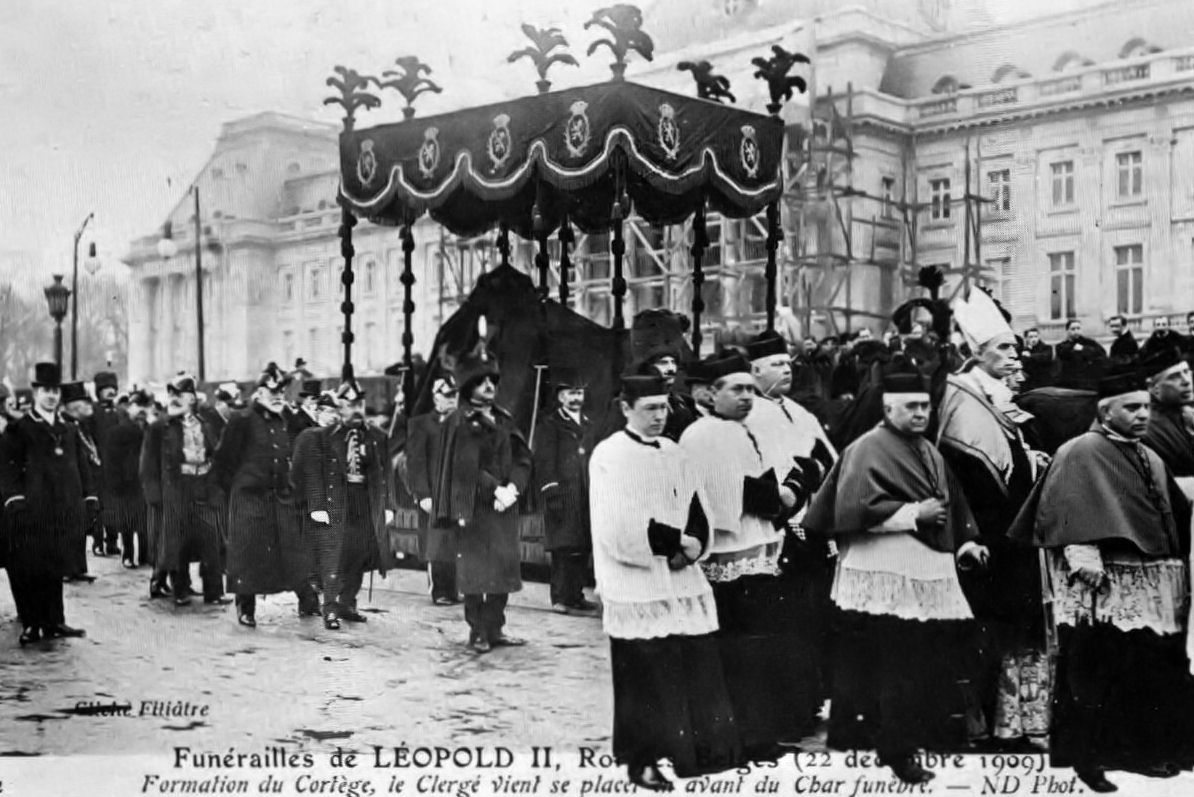
Leopold II's funeral procession passes the unfinished Royal Palace of Brussels, 22 December 1909

Attention to the Congo atrocities subsided in the years after Leopold's death, although his appearance in "The Congo" by Vachel Lindsay, that poet's best known work, memorialised those atrocities:

Listen to the yell of Leopold's ghost
Burning in Hell for his hand-maimed host.
Hear how the demons chuckle and yell
Cutting his hands off, down in Hell.

Statues of him were erected in the 1930s at the initiative of Albert I, while the Belgian government celebrated his accomplishments in Belgium. The debate over Leopold's legacy was reignited in 1999 with the publication of King Leopold's Ghost by American historian Adam Hochschild, which recounts Leopold's plan to acquire the colony, the exploitation, and the large death toll. The debate then periodically resurfaced over the following 20 years.

In 2010, Louis Michel, a Belgian member of the European Parliament and former Belgian foreign minister, called Leopold II a "visionary hero." According to Michel, "To use the word 'genocide' in relation to the Congo is absolutely unacceptable and inappropriate. ... maybe colonisation was domineering and acquiring more power, but at a certain moment, it brought civilisation." Michel's remarks were countered by several Belgian politicians. Senator Pol Van Den Driessche replied, "[A] great visionary? Absolutely not. What happened then was shameful. If we measured him against 21st century standards, it is likely that Leopold would be hauled before the International Criminal Court in The Hague."

In June 2020, a Black Lives Matter demonstration in Brussels protested the murder of George Floyd, causing Leopold II's legacy to become once again the subject of debate. MPs agreed to set up a parliamentary commission to examine Belgium's colonial past, a step likened to the Truth and Reconciliation Committee set up in South Africa after the apartheid regime was abolished. On 30 June, the 60th anniversary of the Democratic Republic of the Congo's independence, King Philippe released a statement expressing his "deepest regret" for the wounds of the colonial past, and the "acts of violence and cruelty committed" in the Congo during colonisation but did not explicitly mention Leopold's role in the atrocities. Some activists accused him of not making a full apology.

=== Statues ===
Equestrian statue of Leopold II, Place du Trône/Troonplein, Brussels

Leopold II remains a controversial figure in the Democratic Republic of the Congo. In the capital Kinshasa (known until 1966 as Leopoldville in his honour) his statue was removed after independence. Congolese culture minister Christophe Muzungu decided to reinstate the statue in 2005. He noted that the beginning of the Free State had been a time of some economic and social progress. He argued that people should recognise some positive aspects of the king as well as the negative, but hours after the six-metre (20 ft) statue was erected near Kinshasa's central station, it was officially removed.

Several statues have been erected to honour the legacy of Leopold II in Belgium. According to Professor of Colonial History Idesbald Goddeeris of the University of Leuven (2018), most of the statues date from the interwar period, the peak of colonial-patriotic propaganda. The monuments were supposed to help get rid of the scandal after international commotion about the atrocities in the Congo Free State during Leopold II's rule, and to raise people's enthusiasm for the colonial enterprise in Belgian Congo.

Leopold's controversial regime in the Congo Free State has motivated proposals for these statues to be removed. During the international George Floyd protests against racism (May–July 2020), several statues of Leopold II were vandalised, and petitions calling for the removal of some or all statues were signed by tens of thousands of Belgians. Other petitions, signed by hundreds, called for the statues to remain.

In early June 2020, a majority in the Brussels Parliament requested a committee to be set up to 'decolonise the public sphere' in the Brussels-Capital Region. From 9 June 2020 onwards, authorities in Belgium began removing some of the statues of Leopold, beginning with ones in Ekeren in the municipality of Antwerp and in the Warocqué Faculty of Economics and Management of the University of Mons on that day.

== Family ==
Leopold and Marie Henriette

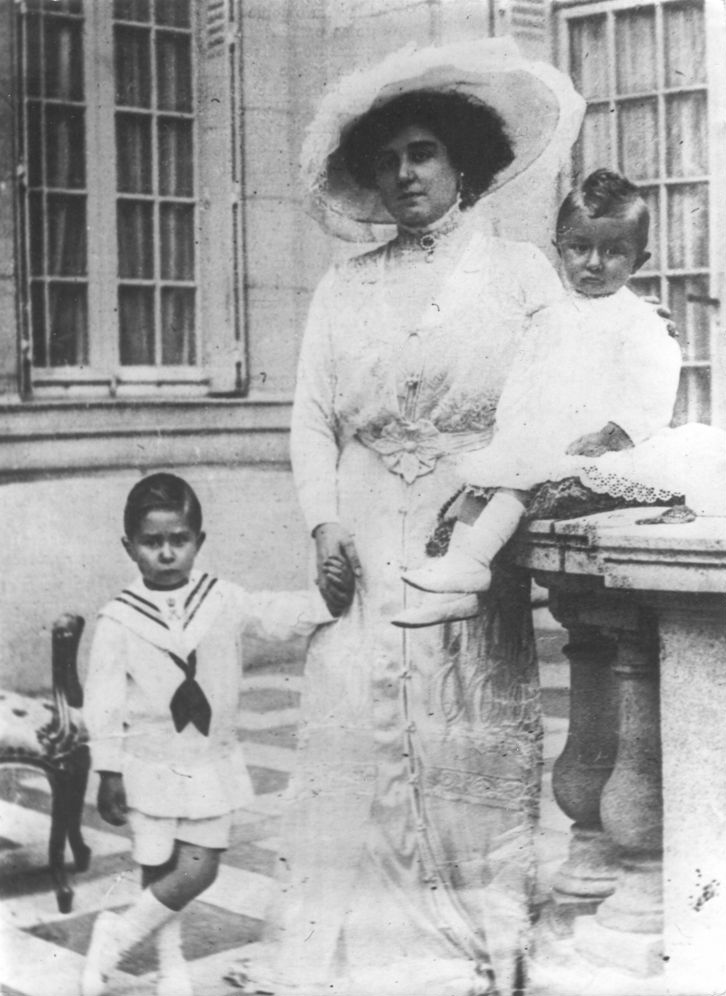
Caroline Lacroix and her children, Lucien, Duke of Tervuren and Philippe, Count of Ravenstein.

Leopold's sister became the Empress Carlota of Mexico. His first cousins included both Queen Victoria of the United Kingdom and her husband Prince Albert, as well as King Fernando II of Portugal.

He had four children with Queen Marie Henriette, of whom the youngest two have descendants living as of 2018:

- Princess Louise of Belgium, born in Brussels on 18 February 1858, and died at Wiesbaden on 1 March 1924. She married Prince Philipp of Saxe-Coburg and Gotha on 4 February 1875, they had two children and divorced on 15 January 1906.
- Prince Leopold, Duke of Brabant, Count of Hainaut (as eldest son of the heir apparent), later Duke of Brabant (as heir apparent), born at Laeken on 12 June 1859, and died at Laeken on 22 January 1869, from pneumonia, after falling into a pond.
- Princess Stéphanie of Belgium, born at Laeken on 21 May 1864, and died at the Archabbey of Pannonhalma in Győr-Moson-Sopron, Hungary, on 23 August 1945. She married (1) Crown Prince Rudolf of Austria, the heir apparent to the throne of Austria-Hungary. In 1889, he died in a suicide pact with his mistress, Baroness Mary Vetsera, at the Mayerling hunting lodge. Stéphanie's second husband was (2) Elemér Edmund Graf Lónyay de Nagy-Lónya et Vásáros-Namény (created, in 1917, Prince Lónyay de Nagy-Lónya et Vásáros-Namény).
- Princess Clémentine of Belgium, born at Laeken on 30 July 1872, and died at Nice on 8 March 1955. She married Prince Napoléon Victor Jérôme Frédéric Bonaparte (1862–1926), head of the Bonaparte family. The current head of the Imperial family, Jean-Christophe, Prince Napoléon is a direct descendant of King Leopold II.

Leopold also fathered two sons by Caroline Lacroix. They were adopted in 1910 by Lacroix's second husband, Antoine Durrieux. Leopold granted them courtesy titles that were honorary, as the parliament would not have supported any official act or decree:

- Lucien Philippe Marie Antoine (9 February 1906 – 15 November 1984) Duke of Tervuren; he married Lucie Gracieuse Mundutey (30 October 1900 – 8 February 2005) on 1 March 1927.
- Philippe Henri Marie François (16 October 1907 – 21 August 1914) Count of Ravenstein

== See also ==
- Abir Congo Company
- Atrocities in the Congo Free State
- Émile Banning
- Congo Free State propaganda war
- Crown Council of Belgium
- Kings of Belgium family tree

== Bibliography ==
- Ascherson, Neal: The King Incorporated, Allen & Unwin, 1963. ISBN 1-86207-290-6 (1999 Granta edition).
- Aronson, Theo: Defiant Dynasty: The Coburgs of Belgium, Bobbs-Merrill, 1968.
- Emerson, Barbara: Leopold II of the Belgians, Weidenfeld & Nicolson, 1979, ISBN 0-297-77569-3.
- Hochschild, Adam: King Leopold's Ghost: A Story of Greed, Terror, and Heroism in Colonial Africa, Mariner Books, 1998. ISBN 0-330-49233-0.
- Janssens, Gustaaf; Stengers, Jean, eds. (1997). Nouveaux regards sur Léopold Ier et Léopold II : Fonds d'Archives Goffinet (in French). Brussels: Fondation Roi Baudouin. ISBN 978-2-87212-216-5.
- Petringa, Maria: Brazza, A Life for Africa, 2006. ISBN 978-1-4259-1198-0
- Wm. Roger Louis and Jean Stengers: E.D. Morel's History of the Congo Reform Movement, Clarendon Press Oxford, 1968.
- Ó Síocháin, Séamas and Michael O'Sullivan, eds: The Eyes of Another Race: Roger Casement's Congo Report and 1903 Diary. University College Dublin Press, 2004. ISBN 1-900621-99-1.
- Ó Síocháin, Séamas: Roger Casement: Imperialist, Rebel, Revolutionary. Dublin: Lilliput Press, 2008.
- Roes, Aldwin (2010). "Towards a History of Mass Violence in the Etat Indépendant du Congo, 1885–1908" (PDF). South African Historical Journal. 62 (4): 634–70. doi:10.1080/02582473.2010.519937. S2CID 144843155. Archived (PDF) from the original on 31 October 2020.
- Stanard, Matthew G. Selling the Congo: A history of European pro-empire propaganda and the making of Belgian imperialism (U of Nebraska Press, 2012)
- Vandenbreeden, Jos; de Puydt, Raoul Maria (2005). Basilique Koekelberg: monument art déco (in French and Dutch). Bruxelles: Editions Racine. ISBN 90-209-6144-6.
- Vanthemsche, Guy (2012). Belgium and the Congo, 1885–1980 (Cambridge UP, ISBN 978-0521194211).
- Vanthemsche, Guy (2006) 'The historiography of Belgian colonialism in the Congo" in C Levai ed., Europe and the World in European Historiography (Pisa University Press), pp. 89–119. online
- Viaene, Vincent. "King Leopold's imperialism and the origins of the Belgian colonial party, 1860–1905." Journal of Modern History 80.4 (2008): 741–90.

Leopold II of Belgium House of Saxe-Coburg and Gotha Cadet branch of the House of Wettin Born: 9 April 1835 Died: 17 December 1909
Regnal titles
Preceded by Leopold I	King of the Belgians; 1865–1909	Succeeded by Albert I
Belgian royalty
New title	Duke of Brabant; 1840–1865	Succeeded by Leopold
