= Jules Vandenpeereboom =

Belgian politician

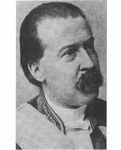

Prime Minister of Belgium
- In office 24 January 1899 – 5 August 1899
- Monarch: Leopold II
- Preceded by: Paul de Smet de Naeyer
- Succeeded by: Paul de Smet de Naeyer

Personal details
- Born: 18 March 1843; Kortrijk, Belgium
- Died: 6 March 1917 (aged 73); Anderlecht, Belgium
- Political party: Catholic Party

Jules (Julius) Henri Pierre François Vandenpeereboom (18 March 1843 – 6 March 1917) was a Belgian Catholic Party politician.

Vandenpeereboom was born in Kortrijk and educated as a lawyer at KU Leuven. He represented Kortrijk in the Belgian Chamber of People's Representatives from 1878 to 1900.

He held several ministerial posts, beginning with Railways, Posts and Telegraphs, from 1884 to 1899. He combined this with the War ministry from 1896. He served as the prime minister of Belgium in 1899. He was responsible for the introduction of bilingual postage stamps in Belgium in the period 1891 to 1893.

On leaving the Chamber, he was appointed an honorary Minister of State in 1900 and served in the Belgian Senate representing West Flanders. He died in Anderlecht.

== See also ==
- List of defence ministers of Belgium

Political offices
Preceded by Paul de Smet de Naeyer	Prime Minister of Belgium; 1899	Succeeded by Paul de Smet de Naeyer
