= Jules de Burlet =

Belgian politician

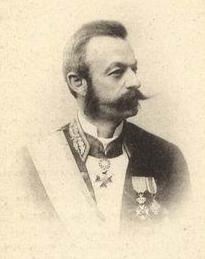

Prime Minister of Belgium
- In office 26 March 1894 – 25 February 1896
- Monarch: Leopold II
- Preceded by: Auguste Marie François Beernaert
- Succeeded by: Paul de Smet de Naeyer

Personal details
- Born: 10 April 1844; Ixelles, Belgium
- Died: 1 March 1897 (aged 52); Nivelles, Belgium
- Political party: Catholic Party

Jules Philippe Marie de Burlet (French pronunciation: [ʒyl filip maʁi də byʁlɛ]; 10 April 1844 – 1 March 1897) was a Belgian Catholic Party politician who served as the Prime Minister of Belgium from 1894 to 1896.

== Career ==
Born in Ixelles, de Burlet was educated as a lawyer. He practised law in Nivelles, where he made his home, and he served as mayor of the town from 1872 to 1891.

From 1884 he represented the Nivelles constituency in the Belgian Chamber of People's Representatives. In 1891 he became Interior minister and in 1894 he left the chamber and became a member of the Belgian Senate. At the same time he became the prime minister of Belgium until 1896. On leaving office he was made an honorary minister of State and served as Belgian ambassador to Portugal in 1896–1897.

He died in Nivelles in 1897.

== See also ==
- fr:Famille de Burlet
- Jules de Burlet in ODIS - Online Database for Intermediary Structures

Political offices
Preceded by Auguste Marie François Beernaert	Prime Minister of Belgium; 1894–1896	Succeeded by Paul de Smet de Naeyer
