= Order of the Eagle =

Order of the Eagle may refer to:

- Order of the Aztec Eagle (Mexico)
- Order of the Black Eagle (Prussia)
- Order of the Black Eagle (Albania)
- Order of the Eagle of Este (Duchy of Modena)
- Most Excellent Order of the Eagle (Namibia)
- Order of the German Eagle (Third Reich)
- Order of the Golden Eagle (Kazakhstan)
- Order of the Mexican Eagle
- Order of the Red Eagle (Prussia)
- Order of the Roman Eagle (Fascist Italy)
- Order of the White Eagle (Poland)
- Order of the White Eagle (Russian Empire)
- Order of the White Eagle (Serbia)

== See also ==
- Order of the Cross of the Eagle (Estonia)
- Order of the Star and Eagles of Ghana
- Order of the Eagle of Georgia and the Seamless Tunic of Jesus Christ
