= List of prime ministers of Belgium by time in office =

This is a list of prime ministers of Belgium by time in office.

== Rank by time in office ==
Affiliation

Christian Democrat
Liberal
Social Democrat
Flemish Nationalist

Rank	Prime Minister	Image	Assumed office	Left office	Time in office (term)	Time in office (total)
1	Charles Rogier		12 August 1847	31 October 1852	5 years, 80 days	15 years, 135 days
1	Charles Rogier		9 November 1857	3 January 1868	10 years, 55 days	15 years, 135 days
2	Wilfried Martens		3 April 1979	31 March 1981	1 year, 362 days	12 years, 78 days
2	Wilfried Martens		17 December 1981	7 March 1992	10 years, 81 days	12 years, 78 days
3	Paul de Smet de Naeyer		25 February 1896	24 January 1899	2 years, 333 days	10 years, 238 days
3	Paul de Smet de Naeyer		5 August 1899	2 May 1907	7 years, 270 days	10 years, 238 days
4	Barthélémy de Theux de Meylandt		4 August 1834	18 April 1840	5 years, 258 days	9 years, 283 days
4	Barthélémy de Theux de Meylandt		31 March 1846	12 August 1847	1 year, 134 days	9 years, 283 days
4	Barthélémy de Theux de Meylandt		7 December 1871	21 August 1874	2 years, 257 days	9 years, 283 days
5	Auguste Beernaert		26 October 1884	26 March 1894		9 years, 151 days
6	Charles de Broqueville		17 June 1911	1 June 1918	6 years, 349 days	9 years, 13 days
6	Charles de Broqueville		22 October 1932	20 November 1934	2 years, 29 days	9 years, 13 days
7	Guy Verhofstadt		12 July 1999	20 March 2008		8 years, 252 days
8	Walthère Frère-Orban		3 January 1868	2 July 1870	2 years, 180 days	8 years, 178 days
8	Walthère Frère-Orban		19 June 1878	16 June 1884	5 years, 363 days	8 years, 178 days
9	Gaston Eyskens		11 August 1949	8 June 1950	301 days	8 years, 67 days
9	Gaston Eyskens		26 June 1958	25 April 1961	2 years, 303 days	8 years, 67 days
9	Gaston Eyskens		17 July 1968	26 January 1973	4 years, 193 days	8 years, 67 days
10	Jean-Luc Dehaene		7 March 1992	12 July 1999		7 years, 127 days
11	Hubert Pierlot		22 February 1939	12 February 1945		5 years, 356 days
12	Achille Van Acker		12 February 1945	13 March 1946	1 year, 29 days	5 years, 218 days
12	Achille Van Acker		31 March 1946	3 August 1946	125 days	5 years, 218 days
12	Achille Van Acker		23 April 1954	26 June 1958	4 years, 64 days	5 years, 218 days
13	Henri Jaspar		20 May 1926	6 June 1931		5 years, 17 days
14	Charles Michel		11 October 2014	27 October 2019		5 years, 16 days
15	Leo Tindemans		25 April 1974	20 October 1978		4 years, 178 days
16	Alexander De Croo		1 October 2020	3 February 2025		4 years, 125 days
17	Jean-Baptiste Nothomb		13 April 1841	30 July 1845		4 years, 108 days
18	Théo Lefèvre		25 April 1961	28 July 1965		4 years, 94 days
19	Jules Malou		21 August 1874	19 June 1878	3 years, 302 days	4 years, 69 days
19	Jules Malou		16 June 1884	26 October 1884	132 days	4 years, 69 days
20	Georges Theunis		16 December 1921	13 May 1925	3 years, 148 days	3 years, 273 days
20	Georges Theunis		20 November 1934	25 March 1935	125 days	3 years, 273 days
21	Frans Schollaert		9 January 1908	17 June 1911		3 years, 159 days
22	Paul-Henri Spaak		15 May 1938	22 February 1939	283 days	3 years, 80 days
22	Paul-Henri Spaak		13 March 1946	31 March 1946	18 days	3 years, 80 days
22	Paul-Henri Spaak		20 March 1947	11 August 1949	2 years, 144 days	3 years, 80 days
23	Elio Di Rupo		6 December 2011	11 October 2014		2 years, 309 days
24	Yves Leterme		20 March 2008	30 December 2008	285 days	2 years, 296 days
24	Yves Leterme		25 November 2009	6 December 2011	2 years, 11 days	2 years, 296 days
25	Paul Vanden Boeynants		19 March 1966	17 July 1968	2 years, 120 days	2 years, 285 days
25	Paul Vanden Boeynants		20 October 1978	3 April 1979	165 days	2 years, 285 days
26	Paul van Zeeland		25 March 1935	24 November 1937		2 years, 244 days
27	Pierre de Decker		30 March 1855	9 November 1857		2 years, 224 days
28	Henri de Brouckère		31 October 1852	30 March 1855		2 years, 150 days
29	Jean Van Houtte		15 January 1952	23 April 1954		2 years, 98 days
30	Léon Delacroix		21 November 1918	20 November 1920		1 year, 365 days
31	Jules de Burlet		26 March 1894	25 February 1896		1 year, 336 days
32	Bart De Wever		3 February 2025	–		1 year, 288 days
33	Albert Goblet d'Alviella		20 October 1832	4 August 1834		1 year, 288 days
34	Jules d'Anethan		2 July 1870	7 December 1871		1 year, 158 days
35	Joseph Pholien		16 August 1950	15 January 1952		1 year, 152 days
36	Jules Renkin		6 June 1931	22 October 1932		1 year, 138 days
37	Joseph Lebeau		28 March 1831	21 July 1831	115 days	1 year, 110 days
37	Joseph Lebeau		18 April 1840	13 April 1841	360 days	1 year, 110 days
38	Edmond Leburton	|	26 January 1973	25 April 1974		1 year, 89 days
39	Félix de Muelenaere		24 July 1831	20 October 1832		1 year, 88 days
40	Henri Carton de Wiart		20 November 1920	16 December 1921		1 year, 26 days
41	Sophie Wilmès		27 October 2019	1 October 2020		340 days
42	Prosper Poullet		17 June 1925	20 May 1926		337 days
43	Herman Van Rompuy		30 December 2008	25 November 2009		330 days
44	Mark Eyskens		31 March 1981	17 December 1981		261 days
45	Sylvain Van de Weyer		30 July 1845	31 March 1846		244 days
46	Jules de Trooz		2 May 1907	31 December 1907		243 days
47	Pierre Harmel		28 July 1965	19 March 1966		234 days
48	Camille Huysmans		3 August 1946	20 March 1947		229 days
49	Jules Vandenpeereboom		24 January 1899	5 August 1899		193 days
50	Gérard Cooreman		1 June 1918	21 November 1918		173 days
51	Paul-Émile Janson		24 November 1937	15 May 1938		172 days
52	Jean Duvieusart		8 June 1950	16 August 1950		69 days
53	Aloys Van de Vyvere		13 May 1925	17 June 1925		35 days
54	Étienne de Gerlache		27 February 1831	10 March 1831		11 days

== See also ==
- Prime Minister of Belgium
- List of prime ministers of Belgium by political affiliation
- Politics of Belgium
