= List of prime ministers of Belgium by political affiliation =

This article is intended to be a comprehensive list of all prime ministers, grouped by political affiliation.

== Prime ministers by political affiliation ==
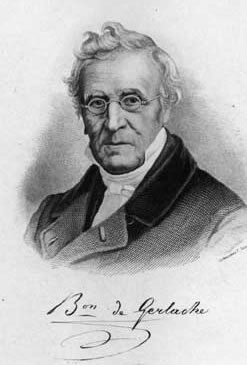
Étienne de Gerlache, Christian Democrat and first Prime Minister of Belgium

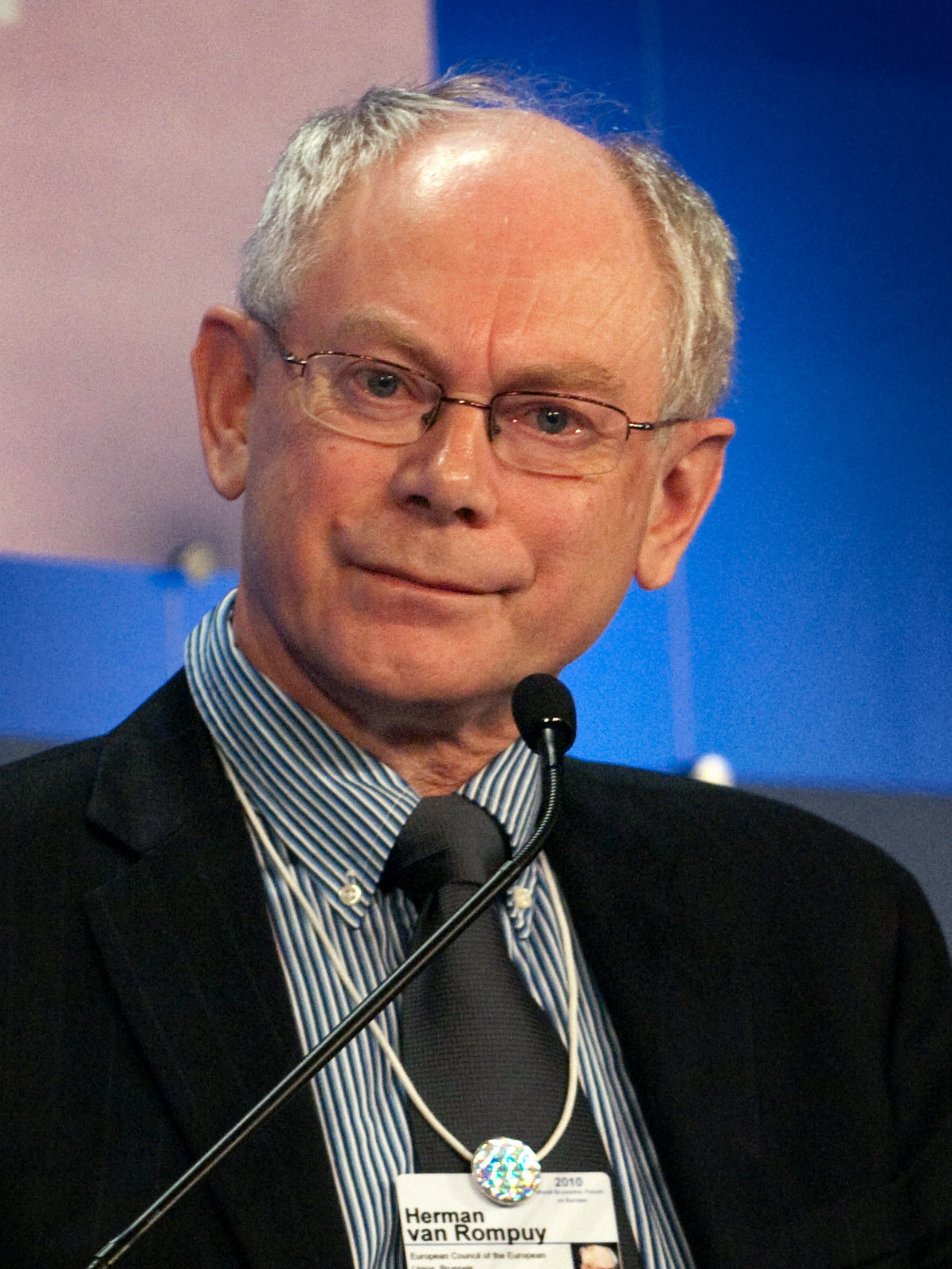
Herman Van Rompuy, a Christian-Democrat, who later became the first permanent European President

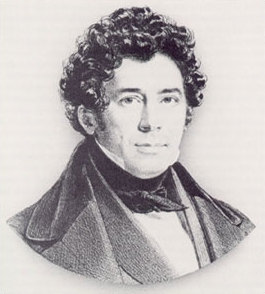
Charles Rogier, Liberal and longest-serving Prime Minister

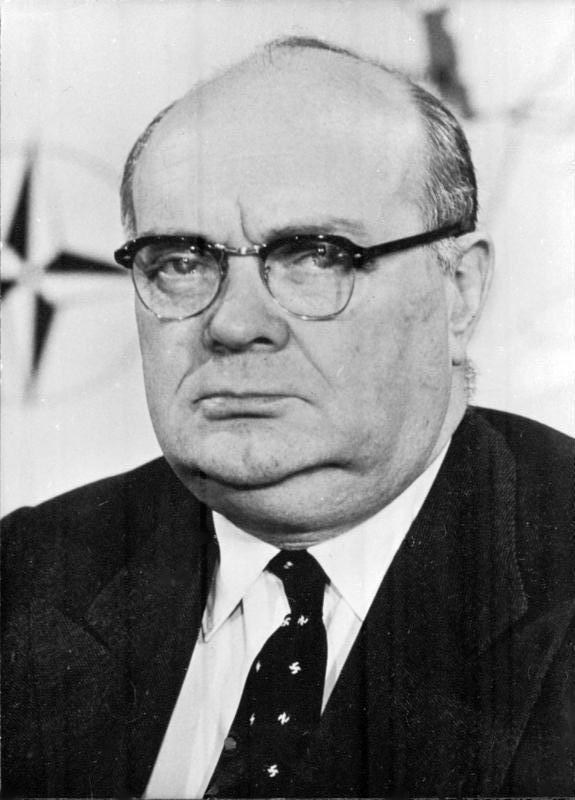
Paul-Henri Spaak, the first Social Democratic Prime Minister

=== Christian Democrat ===
Thirty-six Christian Democrats have served as prime minister, either as being considered Catholic, or as a member of the Catholic Party, the PSC-CVP, the CVP, or the CD&V.

1. Étienne de Gerlache (27 February – 10 March 1831)
2. Felix de Muelenaere (24 July 1831 – 20 October 1832)
3. Barthélémy de Theux de Meylandt (4 August 1834 – 18 April 1840, 31 March 1846 – 12 August 1847, 7 December 1871 – 21 August 1874)
4. Pierre de Decker (30 March 1855 – 9 November 1857)
5. Jules d'Anethan (2 July 1870 – 7 December 1871)
6. Jules Malou (21 August 1874 – 19 June 1878, 16 June – 26 October 1884)
7. Auguste Beernaert (26 October 1884 – 26 March 1894)
8. Jules de Burlet (26 March 1894 – 25 February 1896)
9. Paul de Smet de Naeyer (25 February 1896 – 24 January 1899, 5 August 1899 – 2 May 1907)
10. Jules Vandenpeereboom (24 January – 5 August 1899)
11. Jules de Trooz (2 May – 31 December 1907)
12. Frans Schollaert (9 January 1908 – 17 June 1911)
13. Charles de Broqueville (17 June 1911 – 1 June 1918, 22 October 1932 – 20 November 1934)
14. Gérard Cooreman (1 June – 21 November 1918)
15. Léon Delacroix (21 November 1918 – 20 November 1920)
16. Henri Carton de Wiart (20 November 1920 – 16 December 1921)
17. Georges Theunis (16 December 1921 – 13 May 1925, 20 November 1934 – 25 March 1935)
18. Aloys Van de Vyvere (13 May – 17 June 1925)
19. Prosper Poullet (17 June 1925 – 20 May 1926)
20. Henri Jaspar (20 May 1926 – 6 June 1931)
21. Jules Renkin (6 June 1931 – 22 October 1932)
22. Paul van Zeeland (25 March 1935 – 24 November 1937)
23. Hubert Pierlot (22 February 1939 – 12 February 1945)
24. Gaston Eyskens (11 August 1949 – 8 June 1950, 26 June 1958 – 25 April 1961, 17 July 1968 – 26 January 1973)
25. Jean Duvieusart (8 June – 16 August 1950)
26. Joseph Pholien (16 August 1950 – 15 January 1952)
27. Jean Van Houtte (15 January 1952 – 23 April 1954)
28. Théo Lefèvre (25 April 1961 – 28 July 1965)
29. Pierre Harmel (28 July 1965 – 19 March 1966)
30. Paul Vanden Boeynants (19 March 1966 – 17 July 1968, 20 October 1978 – 3 April 1979)
31. Leo Tindemans (25 April 1974 – 20 October 1978)
32. Wilfried Martens (3 April 1979 – 31 March 1981, 17 December 1981 – 7 March 1992)
33. Mark Eyskens (31 March – 17 December 1981)
34. Jean-Luc Dehaene (7 March 1992 – 12 July 1999)
35. Yves Leterme (20 March – 30 December 2008, 25 November 2009 – 6 December 2011)
36. Herman Van Rompuy (30 December 2008 – 25 November 2009)

=== Liberal ===
Twelve Liberals have served as prime minister, either as being considered Liberal, or as a member of the Liberal Party, the VLD, or the MR.

1. Joseph Lebeau (28 March – 21 July 1831, 18 April 1840 – 13 April 1841)
2. Albert Goblet d'Alviella (20 October 1832 – 4 August 1834)
3. Jean-Baptiste Nothomb (13 April 1841 – 30 July 1845)
4. Sylvain Van de Weyer (30 July 1845 – 31 March 1846)
5. Charles Rogier (12 August 1847 – 31 October 1852, 9 November 1857 – 3 January 1868)
6. Henri de Brouckère (31 October 1852 – 30 March 1855)
7. Walthère Frère-Orban (3 January 1868 – 2 July 1870, 19 June 1878 – 16 June 1884)
8. Paul-Émile Janson (24 November 1937 – 15 May 1938)
9. Guy Verhofstadt (12 July 1999 – 20 March 2008)
10. Charles Michel (11 October 2014 – 27 October 2019)
11. Sophie Wilmès (27 October 2019 – 1 October 2020)
12. Alexander De Croo (1 October 2020 – 3 February 2025)

=== Social Democrat ===
Five Social Democrats have served as prime minister, either as a member of the BWP-POB, the BSP-PSB, or the PS.

1. Paul-Henri Spaak (15 May 1938 – 22 February 1939, 13 March – 31 March 1946, 20 March 1947 – 11 August 1949)
2. Achille Van Acker (12 February 1945 – 13 March 1946, 31 March – 3 August 1946, 23 April 1954 – 26 June 1958)
3. Camille Huysmans (3 August 1946 – 20 March 1947)
4. Edmond Leburton (26 January 1973 – 25 April 1974)
5. Elio Di Rupo (6 December 2011 – 11 October 2014)

=== Nationalist ===
One Nationalist has served as prime minister as a member of the N-VA.

1. Bart De Wever (3 February 2025 – present) [incumbent]

== See also ==
- Prime Minister of Belgium
- List of prime ministers of Belgium by time in office
- Politics of Belgium
