= Albert I of Belgium =

King of the Belgians from 1909 to 1934

Albert I
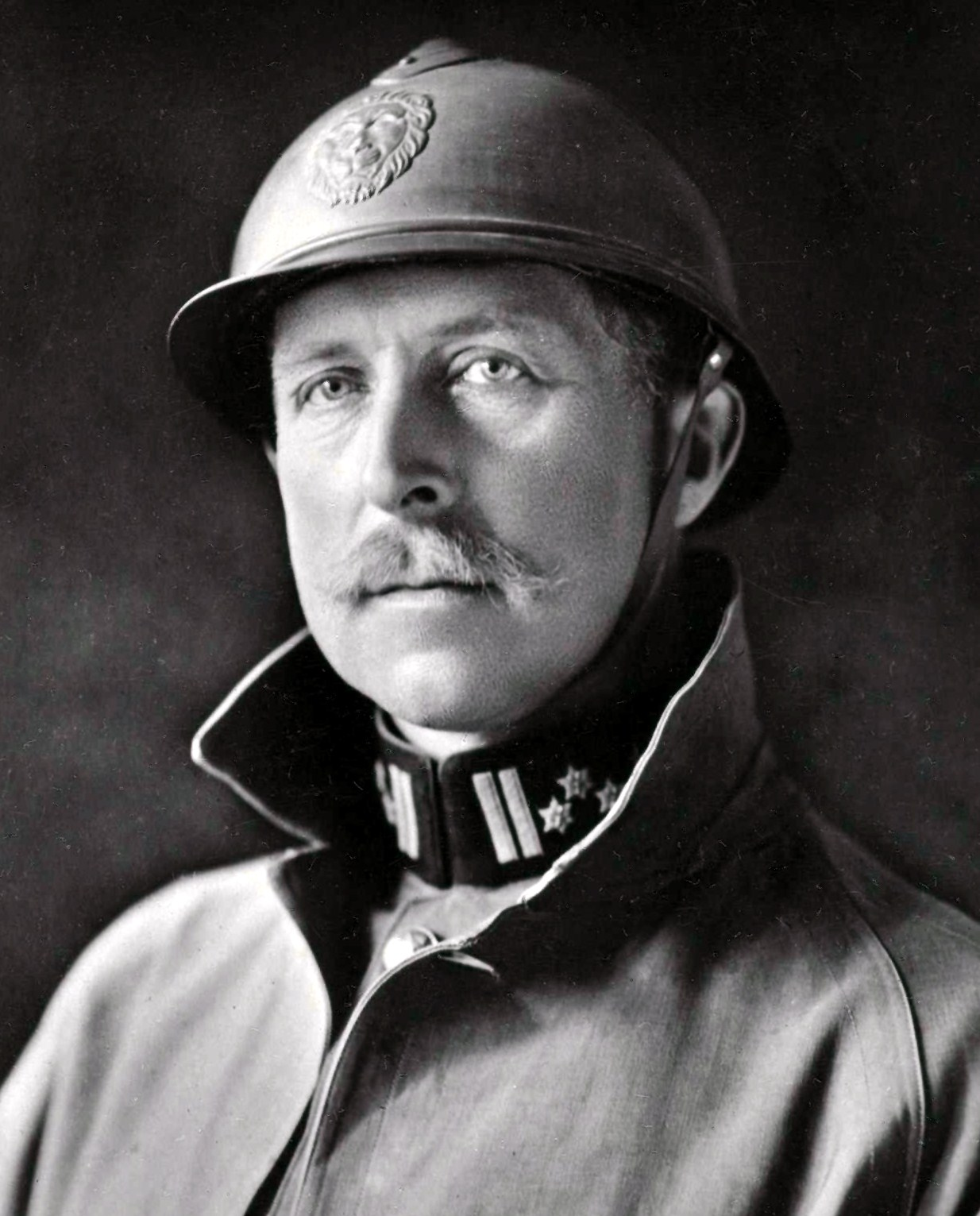
- Albert wearing his characteristic Adrian helmet, c. 1919

King of the Belgians
- Reign: 23 December 1909 – 17 February 1934
- Predecessor: Leopold II
- Successor: Leopold III
- Prime Ministers: See list: Frans Schollaert Charles de Broqueville Gérard Cooreman Léon Delacroix Henri Carton de Wiart Georges Theunis Aloys Van de Vyvere Prosper Poullet Henri Jaspar Jules Renkin Charles de Broqueville (2nd time)
- Born: 8 April 1875; Brussels, Belgium
- Died: 17 February 1934 (aged 58); Marche-les-Dames, Namur, Belgium
- Burial: Church of Our Lady of Laeken
- Spouse: Elisabeth of Bavaria (m. 1900)
- Issue: Leopold III, King of the Belgians; Prince Charles, Count of Flanders; Marie-José, Queen of Italy
Names
- Dutch and German: Albert Leopold Clemens Maria Meinrad; French: Albert Léopold Clément Marie Meinrad
- House: Saxe-Coburg and Gotha (by birth); Belgium (founder)
- Father: Prince Philippe, Count of Flanders
- Mother: Princess Marie of Hohenzollern-Sigmaringen

Albert I (8 April 1875 – 17 February 1934) was King of the Belgians from 23 December 1909 until his death in 1934. He is popularly referred to as the Knight King (Dutch: Koning-Ridder; French: Roi-Chevalier) or Soldier King (Dutch: Koning-Soldaat; French: Roi-Soldat) in Belgium in reference to his role during World War I.

Albert was born in Brussels as the fifth child and second son of Prince Philippe, Count of Flanders, and Princess Marie of Hohenzollern-Sigmaringen. He succeeded his uncle Leopold II to the Belgian throne in 1909. He married Elisabeth of Bavaria, with whom he had three children.

Albert ruled during an eventful period in the history of Belgium, which included the period of World War I (1914–1918), when most of Belgium was occupied by German forces. Other crucial events of his reign included the adoption of the Treaty of Versailles in June 1919, the ruling of the Belgian Congo as an overseas possession of Belgium along with the League of Nations mandate of Ruanda-Urundi, the reconstruction of Belgium following the war, and the first five years of the Great Depression (1929–1934).

Albert died in a mountaineering accident in eastern Belgium in 1934, at the age of 58, and he was succeeded by his son Leopold III (r. 1934–1951).

== Early life ==
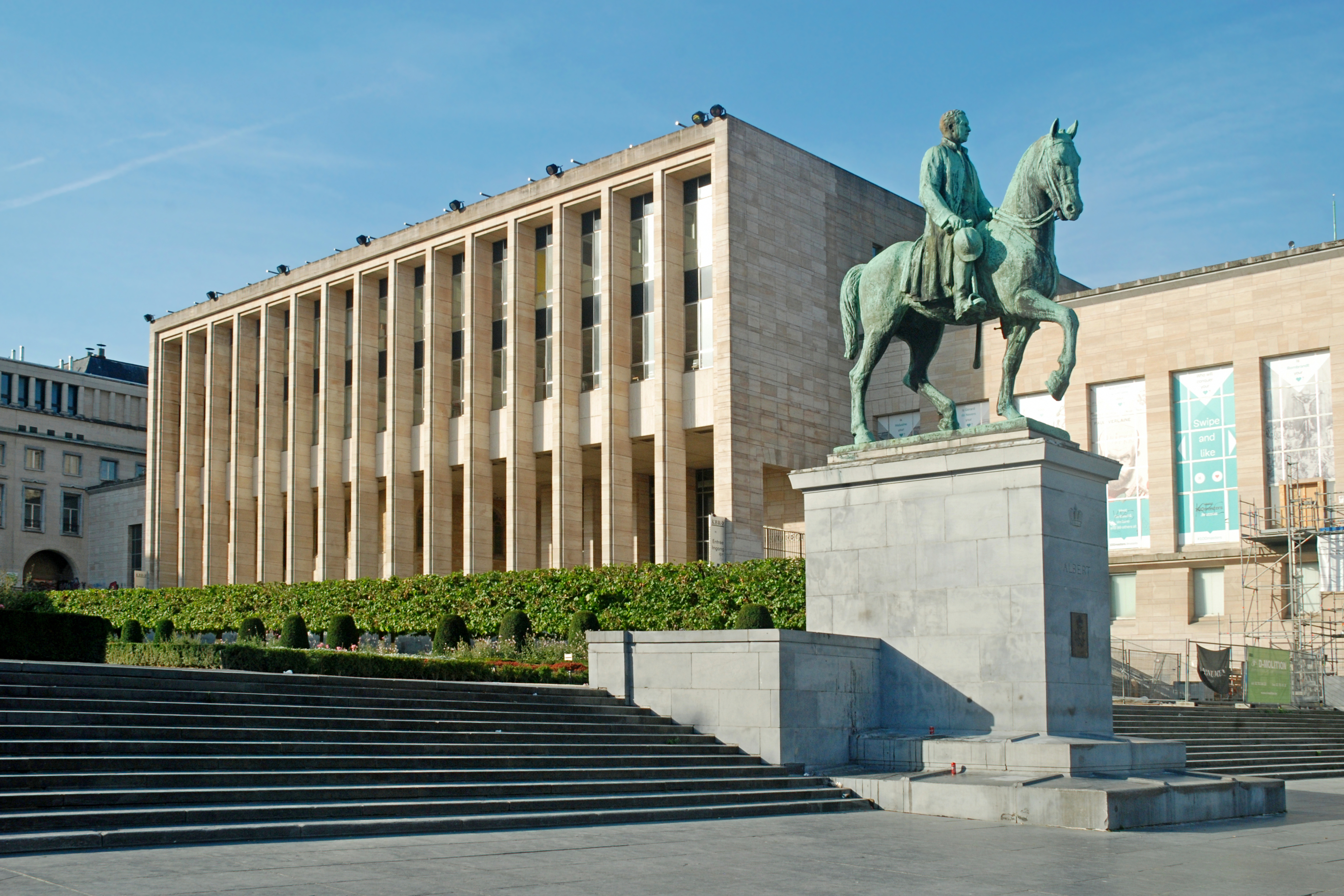
Equestrian statue of King Albert I (Courtens, 1951) in front of the Royal Library of Belgium in Brussels

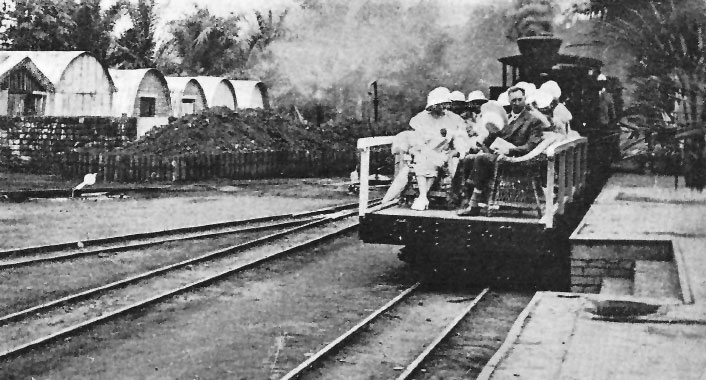
King Albert touring the Belgian Congo during his visit in 1909

Albert Léopold Clément Marie Meinrad was born 8 April 1875 in Brussels, the fifth child and second son of Prince Philippe, Count of Flanders, and his wife, Princess Marie of Hohenzollern-Sigmaringen. Prince Philippe was the third (second surviving) son of Leopold I (r. 1831–1865), the first king of the Belgians, and his wife, Louise-Marie of France, and the younger brother of King Leopold II (r. 1865–1909). Princess Marie was a relative of Kaiser Wilhelm II of Germany (r. 1888–1918), and a member of the non-reigning, Catholic branch of the Hohenzollern family. Albert grew up in the Palace of the Count of Flanders, initially as third in the line of succession to the Belgian throne as his reigning uncle Leopold II's son had already died. When, however, Albert's older brother, Prince Baudouin of Belgium, who had been subsequently prepared for the throne, also died young, Albert, at the age of 16, unexpectedly became second in line (after his father) to the Belgian Crown.

Retiring and studious, Albert prepared himself strenuously for the task of kingship. In his youth, Albert was seriously concerned with the situation of the working classes in Belgium, and personally travelled around working-class districts incognito, to observe the living conditions of the people. Shortly before his accession to the throne in 1909, Albert undertook an extensive tour of the Belgian Congo, which had been annexed by Belgium in 1908, finding the country in poor condition. Upon his return to Belgium, he recommended reforms to protect the native population and further technological progress in the colony.

== Marriage ==
Albert was married in Munich on 2 October 1900 to Elisabeth of Bavaria, a Wittelsbach princess whom he had met at a family funeral. The civil wedding was conducted by Friedrich Krafft Graf von Crailsheim in the Throne Hall, and the religious wedding was conducted by Cardinal von Stein, assisted by Jakob von Türk, Confessionar of the King of Bavaria.

Based on the letters written during their engagement and marriage (cited extensively in the memoirs of their daughter, Marie-José) the young couple appear to have been deeply in love. The letters express a deep mutual affection based on a rare affinity of spirit. They also make clear that Albert and Elisabeth continually supported and encouraged each other in their challenging roles as king and queen. The spouses shared an intense commitment to their country and family and a keen interest in human progress of all kinds. Together, they cultivated the friendship of prominent scientists, artists, mathematicians, musicians, and philosophers, turning their court at Laeken into a kind of cultural salon.

=== Children ===
Albert and Elisabeth had three children:

- Léopold Philippe Charles Albert Meinrad Hubert Marie Michel, Duke of Brabant, Prince of Belgium, who became the fourth king of the Belgians as Leopold III (3 November 1901 – 25 September 1983, at Woluwe-Saint-Lambert).
- Charles Théodore Henri Antoine Meinrad, Count of Flanders, Prince of Belgium, Prince Regent of Belgium (10 October 1903, in Brussels – 1 June 1983, at Ostend).
- Marie-José Charlotte Sophie Amélie Henriette Gabrielle, last Queen of Italy (4 August 1906, in Ostend – 27 January 2001). She was married at Rome, Italy on 8 January 1930 to Prince Umberto Nicola Tommaso Giovanni Maria, Prince of Piemonte (born 15 September 1904 and died on 18 March 1983 at Geneva, Switzerland). He became King Umberto II (r. 1946) of Italy.

== Accession ==
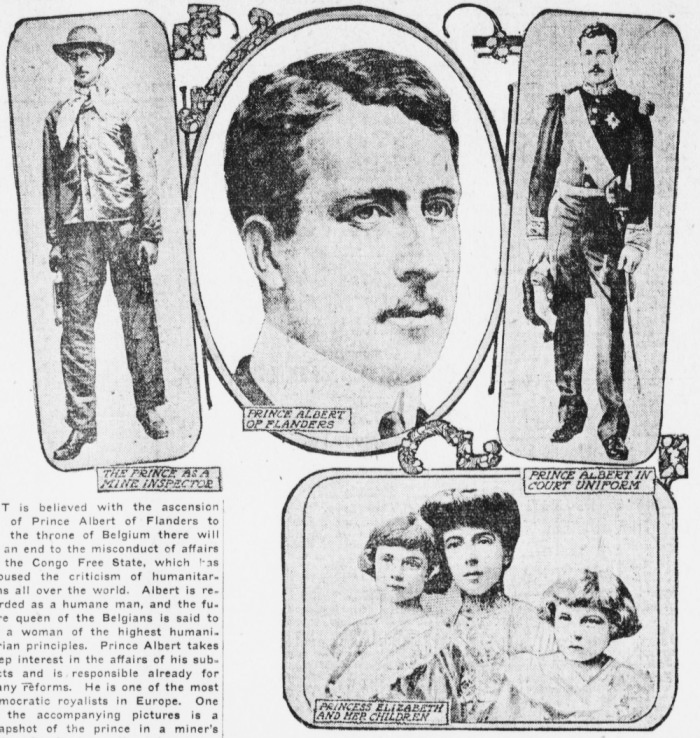
Newspaper compilation in December 1909 shows Albert at top left after inspection of a mine. His wife and children are at bottom right.

Following the death of his uncle, Leopold II, Albert succeeded to the Belgian throne in December 1909, since Albert's own father had died in 1905. Previous Belgian kings had taken the royal accession oath only in French; Albert innovated by taking it in Dutch as well. He and his wife, Queen Elisabeth, were popular in Belgium due to their simple, unassuming lifestyle and their harmonious family life, which stood in marked contrast to the aloof, autocratic manner and the dissolute private life of Leopold II. An important aspect of the early years of Albert's reign was his institution of many reforms in the administration of the Belgian Congo, Belgium's only colonial possession.

== Religion ==
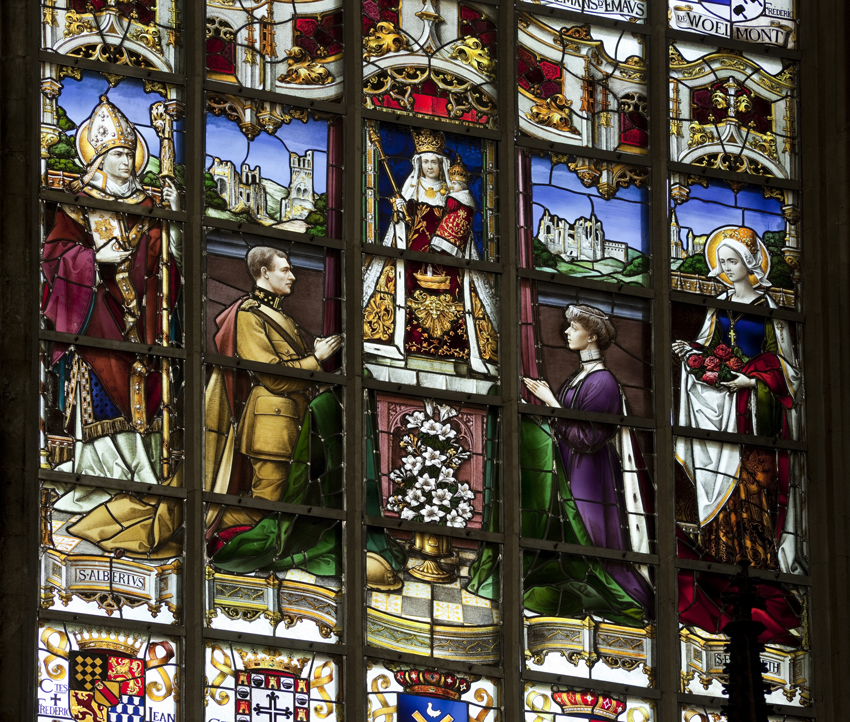
King Albert I and Queen Elisabeth praying to Our Lady of the Sablon, stained glass

King Albert was a devout Catholic. Many stories illustrate his deep and tender piety. For instance, when his former tutor General De Grunne, in his old age, entered the Benedictine monastery of Maredsous in Belgium, King Albert wrote a letter to him in which he spoke of the joy of giving oneself to God. He said: "May you spend many years at Maredsous in the supreme comfort of soul that is given to natures touched by grace, by faith in God's infinite power and confidence in His goodness." To another friend, Lu Zhengxiang, a former prime minister of China who became a Catholic monk in Belgium, Albert wrote: "Consecrating oneself wholly to the service of Our Lord gives, to those touched by grace, the peace of soul which is the supreme happiness here below." Albert used to tell his children: "As you nourish your body, so you should nourish your soul." In an interesting meditation on what he viewed as the harm that would result if Christian ideals were abandoned in Belgium, he said: "Every time society has distanced itself from the Gospel, which preached humility, fraternity, and peace, the people have been unhappy, because the pagan civilisation of ancient Rome, which they wanted to replace it with, is based only on pride and the abuse of force" (Commemorative speech for the war dead of the Battle of the Yser, given by Dom Marie-Albert, Abbot of Orval Abbey, Belgium, in 1936).

== World War I ==
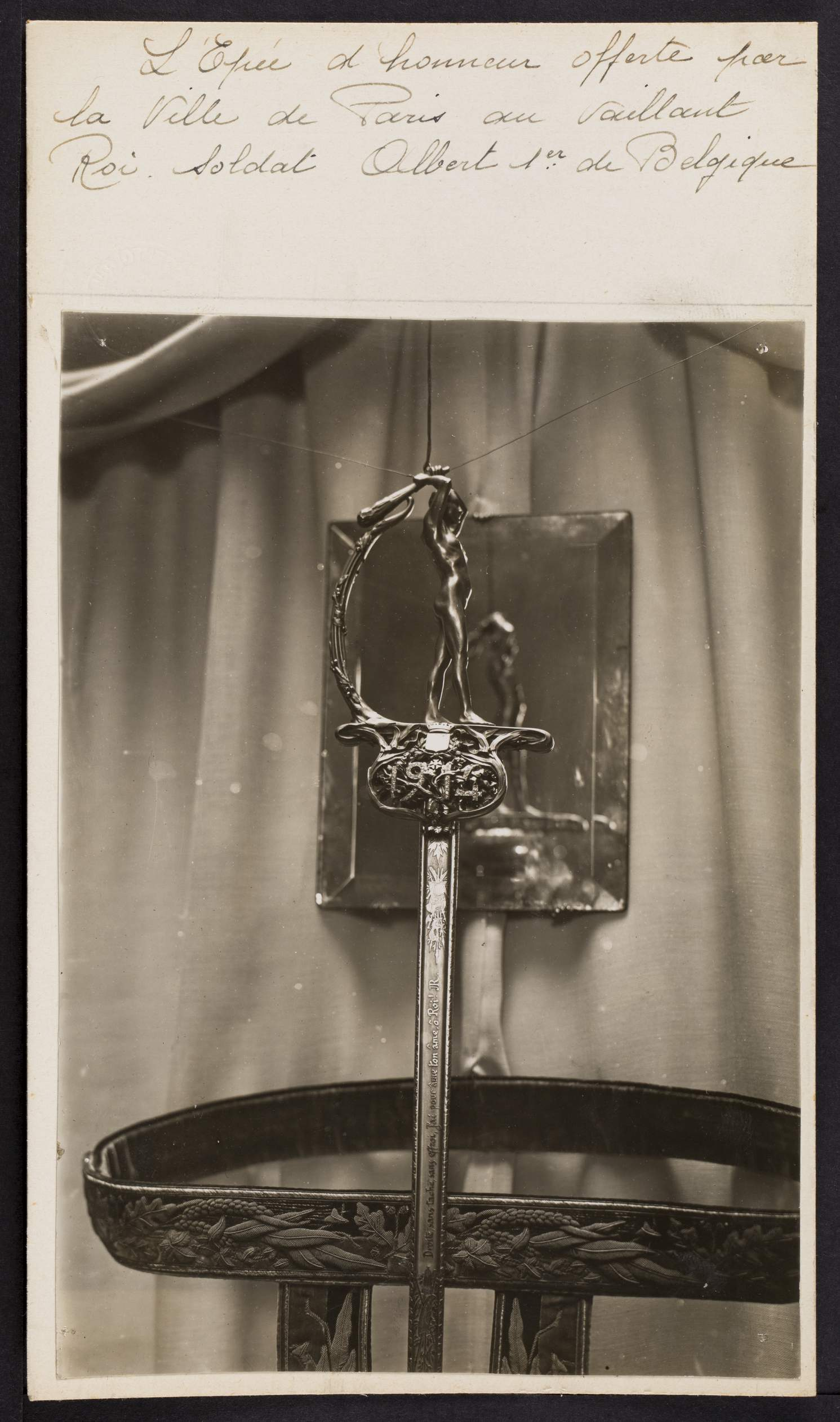
Sword of honor offered by the city of Paris to Albert I of Belgium

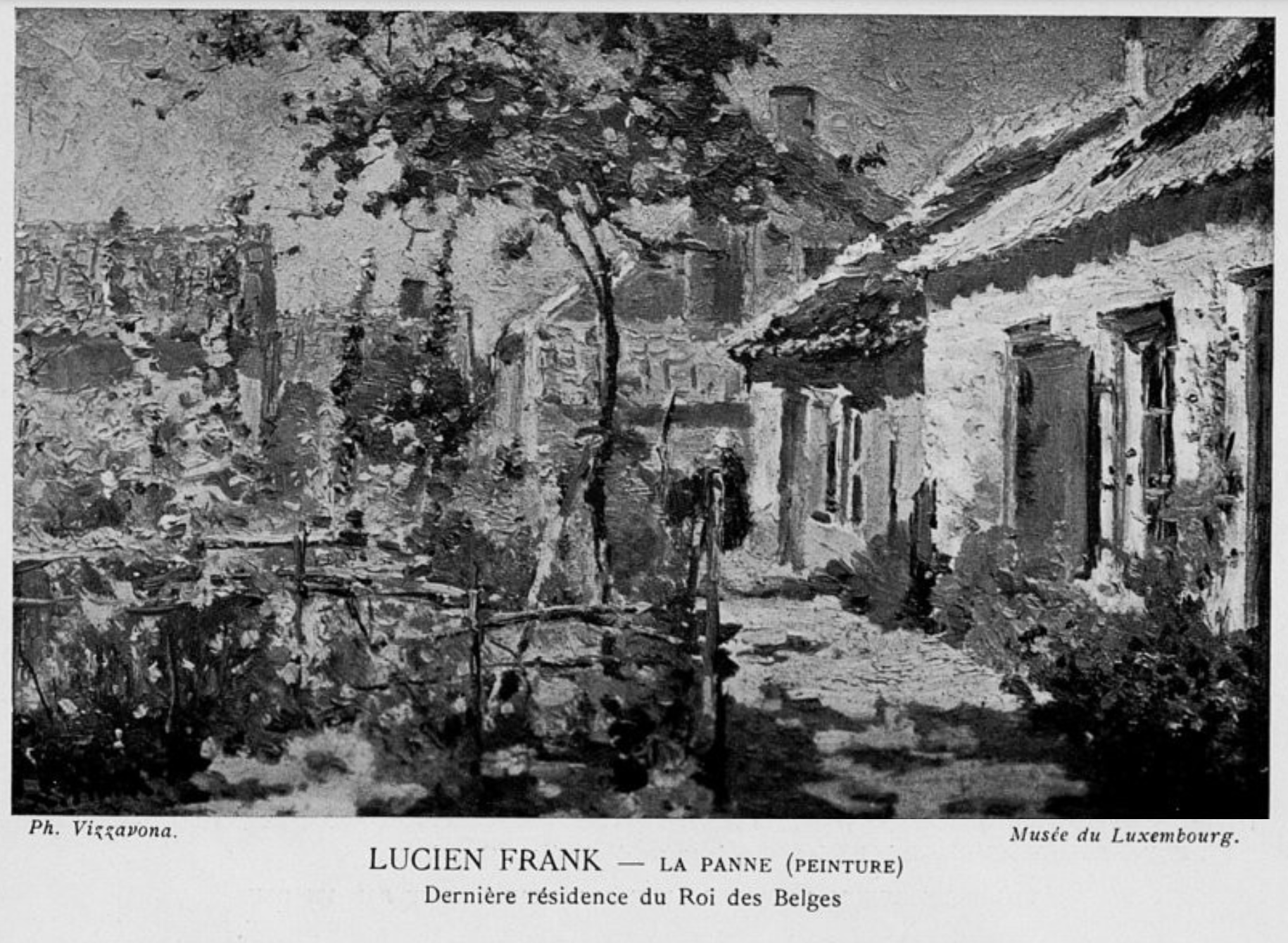
Lucien Frank, Residence of King Albert I during WW I in De Panne, 1915.

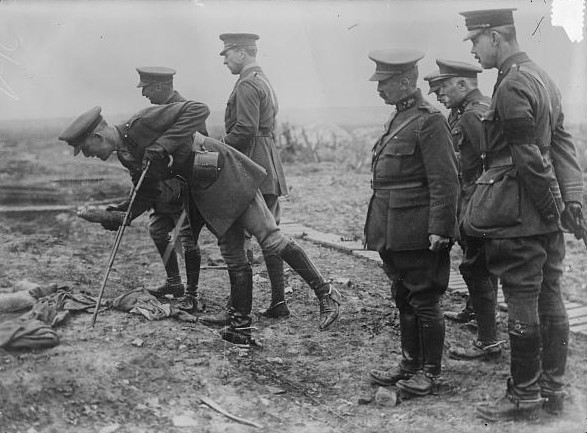
Albert wearing the uniform of a British infantry officer inspecting the front line with British and Belgian officers.

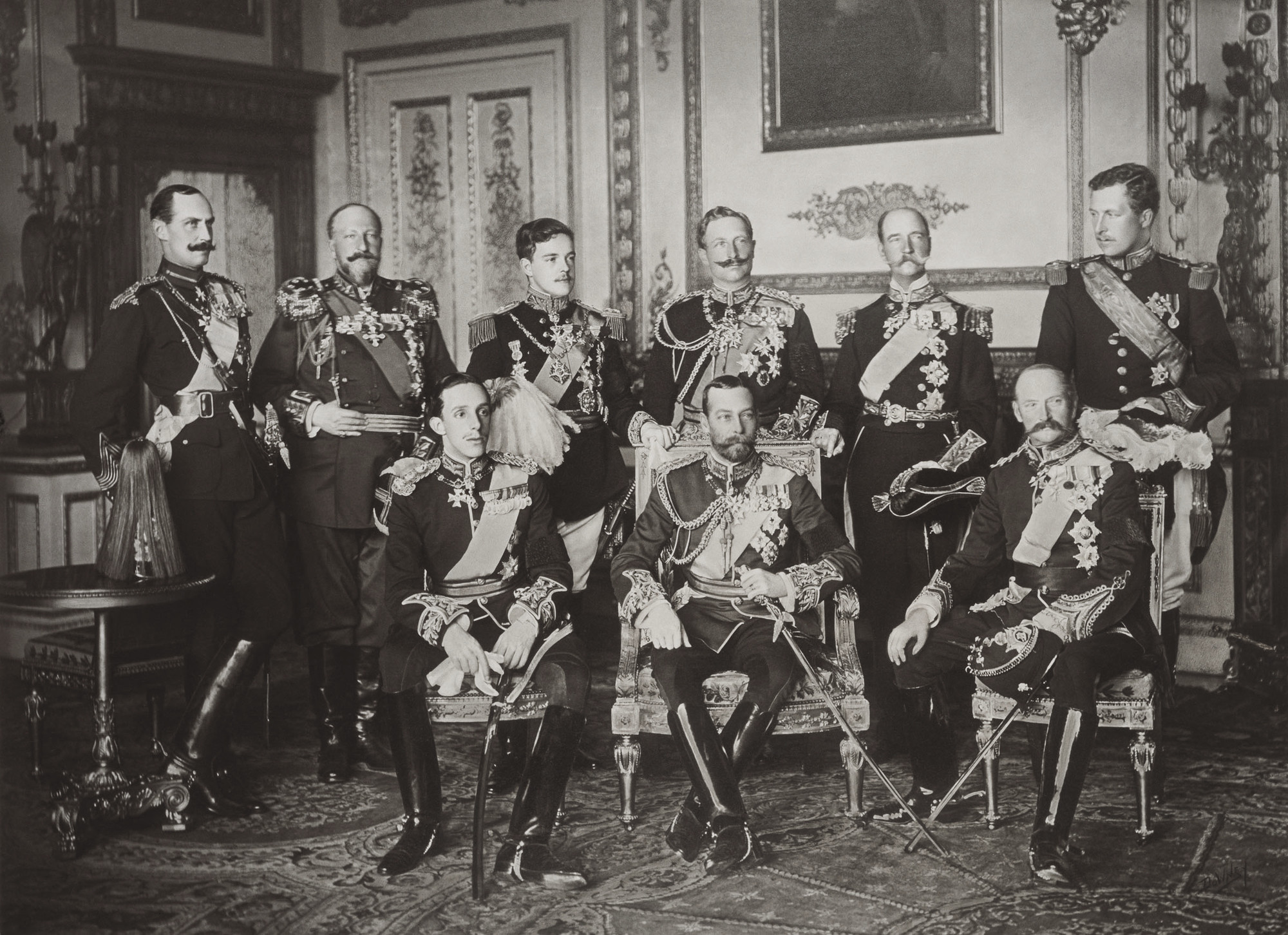
The nine sovereigns at Windsor for the funeral of King Edward VII, photographed on 20 May 1910.

The war inflicted great suffering on Belgium, which was subjected to a harsh German occupation. The King, fearing the destructive results of the war for Belgium and Europe and appalled by the huge casualty rates, worked through secret diplomatic channels for a negotiated peace between Germany and the Entente based on the "no victors, no vanquished" concept. He considered that such a resolution to the conflict would best protect the interests of Belgium and the future peace and stability of Europe. Neither Germany nor the Entente were favourable to the idea, tending instead to seek total victory, and Albert's attempts to further a negotiated peace were unsuccessful. At the end of the war, as commander of the Army Group Flanders, consisting of Belgian, British and French divisions, Albert led the final offensive of the war that liberated occupied Belgium. King Albert, Queen Elisabeth, and their children then reentered Brussels to a hero's welcome.

The King Albert I Memorial in Nieuwpoort is dedicated to King Albert and the Belgian troops during the Great War. There are also at least two memorials to Albert outside Belgium, to commemorate his role in the Great War: Nancy, France has a Boulevard Albert Ier and a statue of the King, and Le Havre, France has a Boulevard Albert Ier. Interestingly, the Nancy statue is marked "Albert Ier" even though, when it was erected in 1934 following his death earlier that year, he was the only King of the Belgians to have been called Albert.

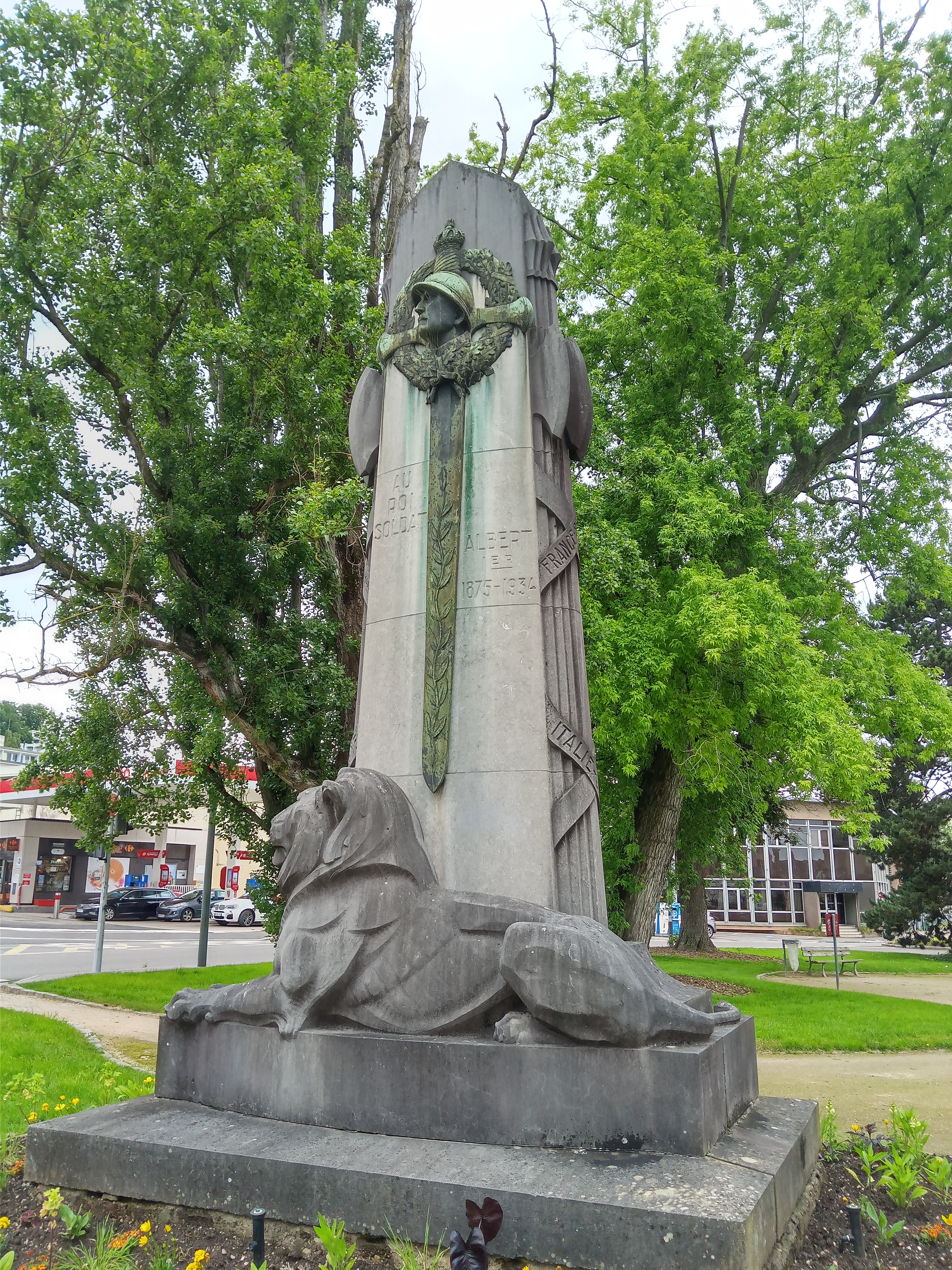
Statue of King Albert I of the Belgians in Nancy, France

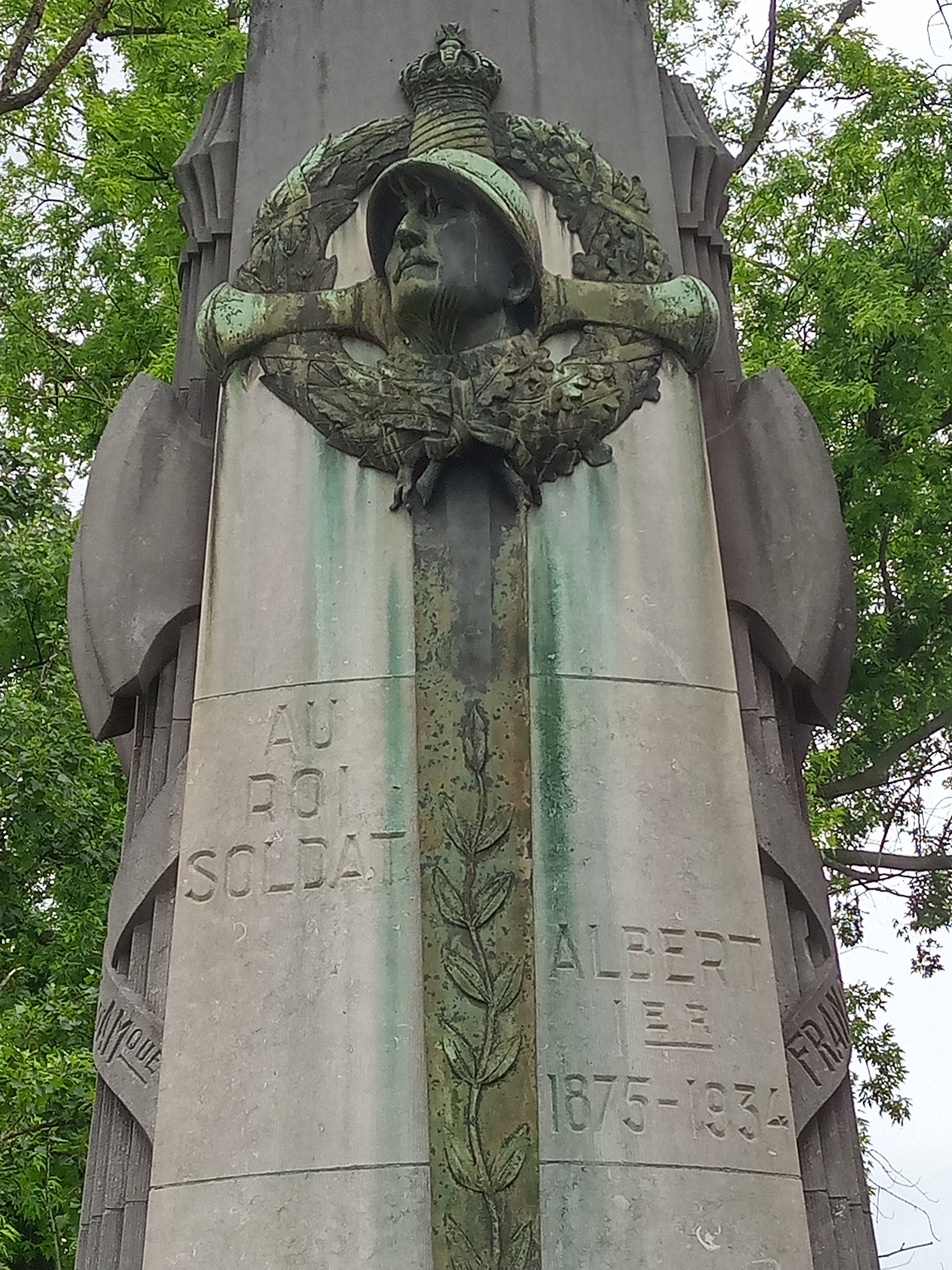
Closeup of the statue of King Albert I showing his epithet ('Soldier King') and dates

== Post-war years ==
Upon his return to Brussels, King Albert made a speech in which he outlined the reforms he desired to see implemented in Belgium, including an improved military, universal suffrage and the establishment of a Flemish University in Ghent.

=== Trip to the United States ===
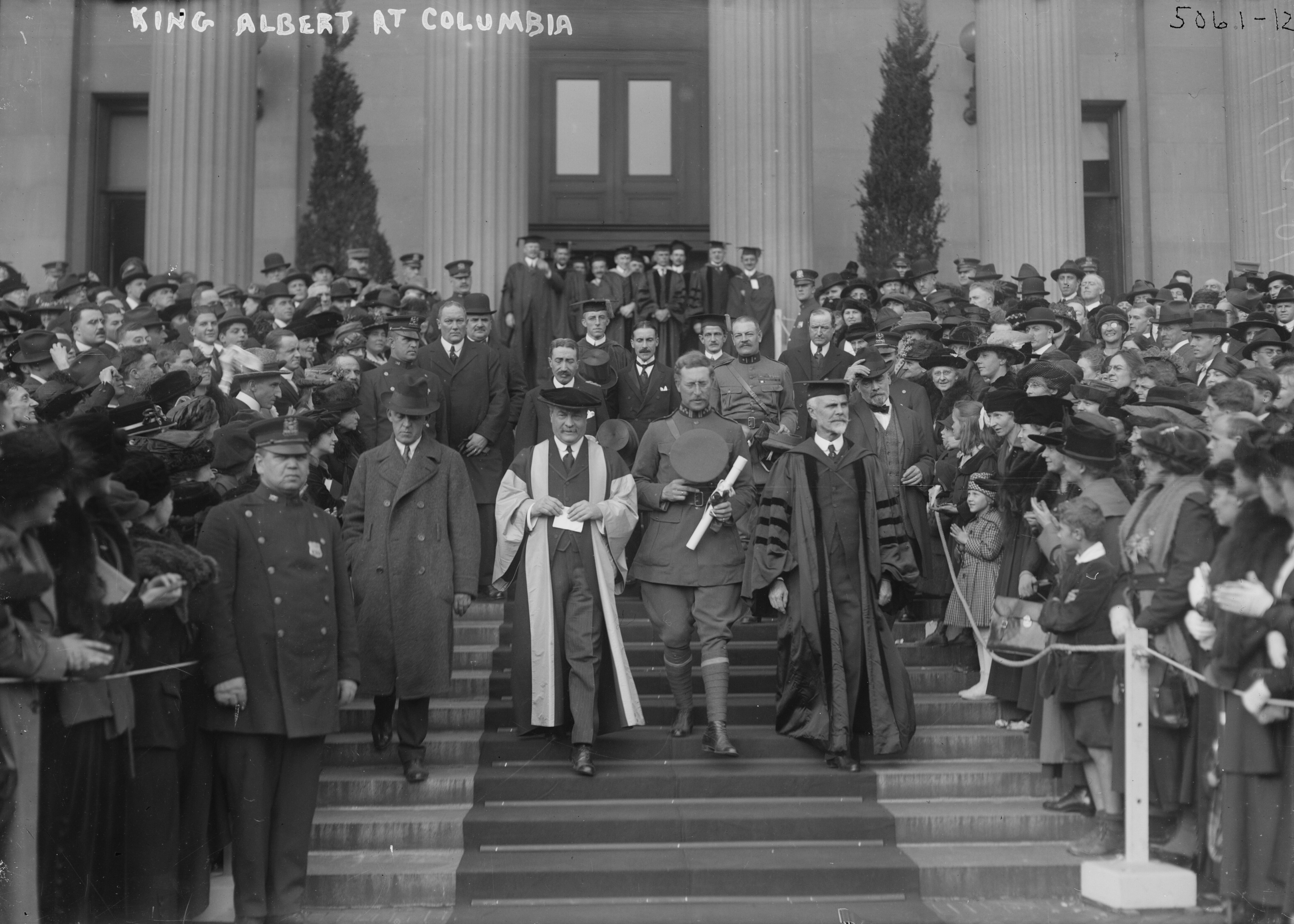
King Albert at Columbia University after receiving an honorary degree, 1919

From 23 September to 13 November 1919, King Albert, Queen Elisabeth of Bavaria, and their son Prince Leopold made an official visit to the United States. King Albert and his party arrived in New York City on 2 October. The party would then proceed to visit several sites in the Eastern United States including Boston and Niagara Falls, before heading to the Western United States. King Albert and his party arrived in California on 10 October. Upon arrival in Sacramento, the King awarded the Order of Leopold II to the engineer who was on board the King's special train. During his brief stay in Sacramento thousands came to see the Belgian royals, with mothers even holding out their babies for the King to kiss. During a visit of the historic Native American pueblo of Isleta Pueblo, New Mexico, King Albert decorated Father Anton Docher with Knight in the Order of Leopold II. Docher offered the King a turquoise cross mounted in silver made by the Tiwas Indians. Ten thousand people travelled to Isleta for this occasion. That same year he was elected an honorary member of the New York Society of the Cincinnati. In New York, the King received a ticker tape parade in his honor. The visit was considered a success by the Belgian authorities.

=== Introduction of universal male suffrage ===
Since the Belgian general strike of 1893, plural votes had been granted to individual men based on their wealth, education, and age, but after the Belgian general strike of 1913 the promise had been made to have constitutional reform for one man, one vote universal suffrage but the German invasion of Belgium in August 1914 and the subsequent occupation delayed the implementation of the commission's proposal.

In 1918, King Albert forged a post-war "Government of National Union" made up of members of the three main parties in Belgium, the Catholics, the Liberals, and the Socialists and attempted to mediate between the parties in order to bring about one man, one vote universal suffrage for men. He succeeded in doing so.

=== Paris Peace Conference ===
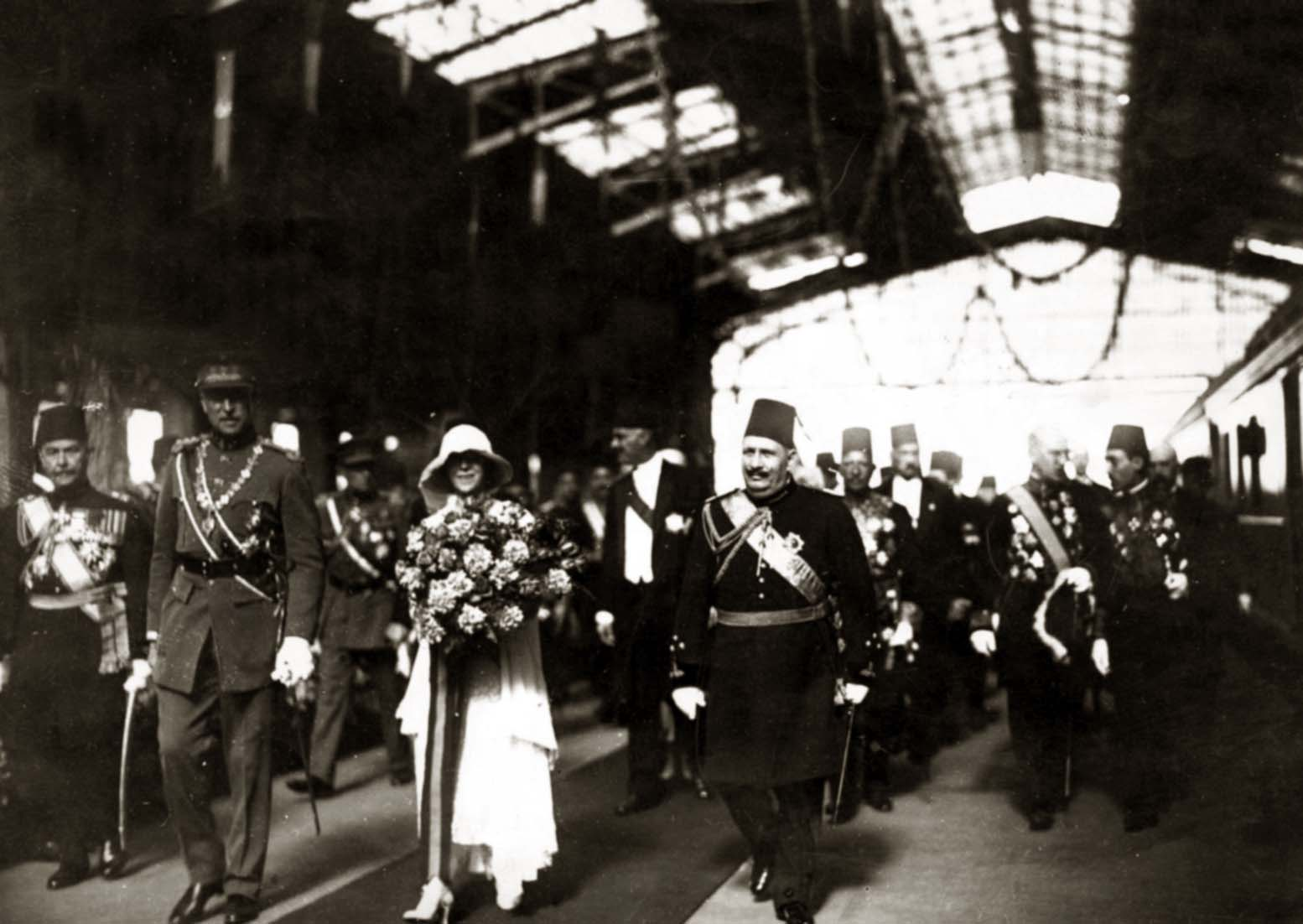
King Albert (left) with his wife and Fuad I of Egypt, 1930

The Belgian Government sent the King to the Paris Peace Conference in April 1919, where he met with the leaders of France, Britain, and the United States. He had four strategic goals:

1. to restore and expand the Belgian economy using cash reparations from Germany;
2. to assure Belgium's security by the creation of a new buffer state on the left bank of the Rhine;
3. to revise the obsolete treaty of 1839;
4. to promote a 'rapprochement' between Belgium and the Grand Duchy of Luxembourg.

He strongly advised against a harsh, punitive treaty against Germany, fearing such a peace would encourage future German military aggression. He also considered that the dethronement of the princes of Central Europe and, in particular, the dissolution of the Habsburg Empire, would constitute a serious menace to peace and stability on the continent. The Allies considered Belgium to be the chief victim of the war, and it aroused enormous popular sympathy, but the King's advice played a small role in Paris.

=== Later years ===
Albert spent much of the remainder of his reign assisting in the postwar reconstruction of Belgium.

In 1920 Albert changed the family name from "Saxe-Coburg-Gotha" to "House of Belgium" (van België, in Dutch; de Belgique in French) as a result of strong anti-German sentiment. This mirrored the British royal family's name-change to House of Windsor in 1917.

Albert was a committed conservationist and in 1925, influenced by the ideas of Carl E. Akeley, he founded Africa's first national park, now known as Virunga National Park, in what is now Democratic Republic of Congo.

== Death ==
A passionate alpinist, King Albert I died in a mountaineering accident on 17 February 1934, while climbing alone on the Roche du Vieux Bon Dieu at Marche-les-Dames, in the Ardennes region of Belgium near Namur. His death shocked the world and he was deeply mourned, both in Belgium and abroad. Because King Albert was an expert climber, some questioned the official version of his death and suggested that the King was murdered (or even committed suicide) somewhere else and that his body had never been at Marche-les-Dames, or that it was deposited there. Several of those hypotheses with criminal motives were investigated by authorities, but doubts have remained ever since, being the subject of popular novels, books, and documentaries. Rumors of murder have been dismissed by most historians. There are two possible explanations for his death, according to the official juridical investigations: the first was that the king leaned against a boulder at the top of the mountain that became dislodged; the second that the pinnacle to which his rope was belayed broke, causing him to fall about 60 feet (18 metres). In 2016, DNA testing by geneticist Maarten Larmuseau and colleagues from the Katholieke Universiteit Leuven on bloodstained leaves that were collected in 1934 from Marche-les-Dames concluded that King Albert had died at that location.

Like his predecessors Leopold I and Leopold II, King Albert is interred in the Royal Crypt at the Church of Our Lady of Laeken in Brussels.

In 1935, prominent Belgian author Emile Cammaerts published a widely acclaimed biography of King Albert I, titled Albert of Belgium: Defender of Right. In 1993, a close climbing companion of the King, Walter Amstutz, founded the King Albert I Memorial Foundation, an association based in Switzerland and dedicated to honouring distinguished individuals in the mountaineering world.

To celebrate 175 years of the Belgian royal family and the 100th anniversary of his accession, Albert I was selected as the main motif of a high-value collectors' coin: the Belgian 12.5 euro Albert I commemorative coin, minted in 2008. The obverse shows a portrait of the King.

== See also ==
- Kings of Belgium family tree
- Crown Council of Belgium
- Royal Trust

Albert I of Belgium House of Saxe-Coburg and Gotha Cadet branch of the House of Wettin Born: 8 April 1875 Died: 17 February 1934
Regnal titles
Preceded by Leopold II	King of the Belgians; 1909–1934	Succeeded by Leopold III
