= Henri Jaspar =

Belgian former prime minister

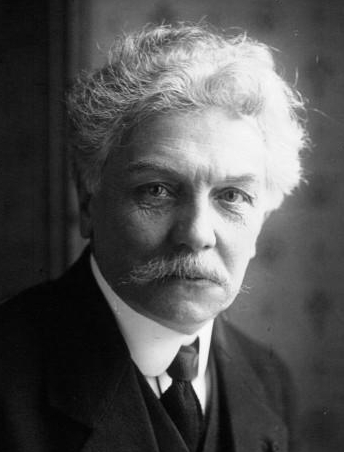
- Jaspar in 1921

Prime Minister of Belgium
- In office 20 May 1926 – 6 June 1931
- Monarch: Albert I
- Preceded by: Prosper Poullet
- Succeeded by: Jules Renkin

Personal details
- Born: 28 July 1870 Schaerbeek, Belgium
- Died: 15 February 1939 (aged 68) Saint-Gilles, Belgium
- Party: Catholic Party

Henri Jaspar (28 July 1870 – 15 February 1939) was a Belgian Catholic Party politician who served as prime minister of Belgium from 1926 to 1931.

He was born in Schaerbeek and trained as a lawyer. Jaspar represented Liège as a Catholic in the Belgian Chamber of Representatives from 1919 until 1936. He served as a Belgian delegate to the Paris Peace Conference in 1919. He helped create the Belgium-Luxembourg Economic Union in 1921. In 1924, he was made an honorary minister of State.

Jaspar held several ministerial positions including;

- Minister of Economic Affairs (1918–1920)
- Foreign Minister (1920–1924 and 1934)
- Minister of Finance (1932–1934)

== Honours ==
- Belgium: Minister of State, by Royal decree
- Belgium: Grand Cross in the Order of Leopold
- Grand Cross in the Order of Pius IX
- France: Grand Cross in the Legion of Honour
- Grand Cross in the Order of Saint Michael and Saint George
- Kingdom of Italy: Knight Grand Cross in the Order of Saints Maurice and Lazarus
- Sweden: Grand Cross with Chain in the Order of Vasa

Political offices
Preceded by Jules Renkin	Minister of Interior; 1920	Succeeded by Henri Carton de Wiart
Preceded by Léon Delacroix	Minister for Foreign Affairs; 1920–1924	Succeeded by Paul Hymans
Preceded by Prosper Poullet	Prime Minister of Belgium; 1926–1931	Succeeded by Jules Renkin
Preceded by Édouard Rolin-Jaequemyns	Minister of Interior; 1926–1927	Succeeded by Maurice Vauthier
Preceded by Henri Baels	Minister of Interior; 1931	Succeeded by Jules Renkin
Preceded by Jules Renkin	Minister of Finance; 1932–1934	Succeeded by Gustave Sap
