= Frans Schollaert =

Belgian politician

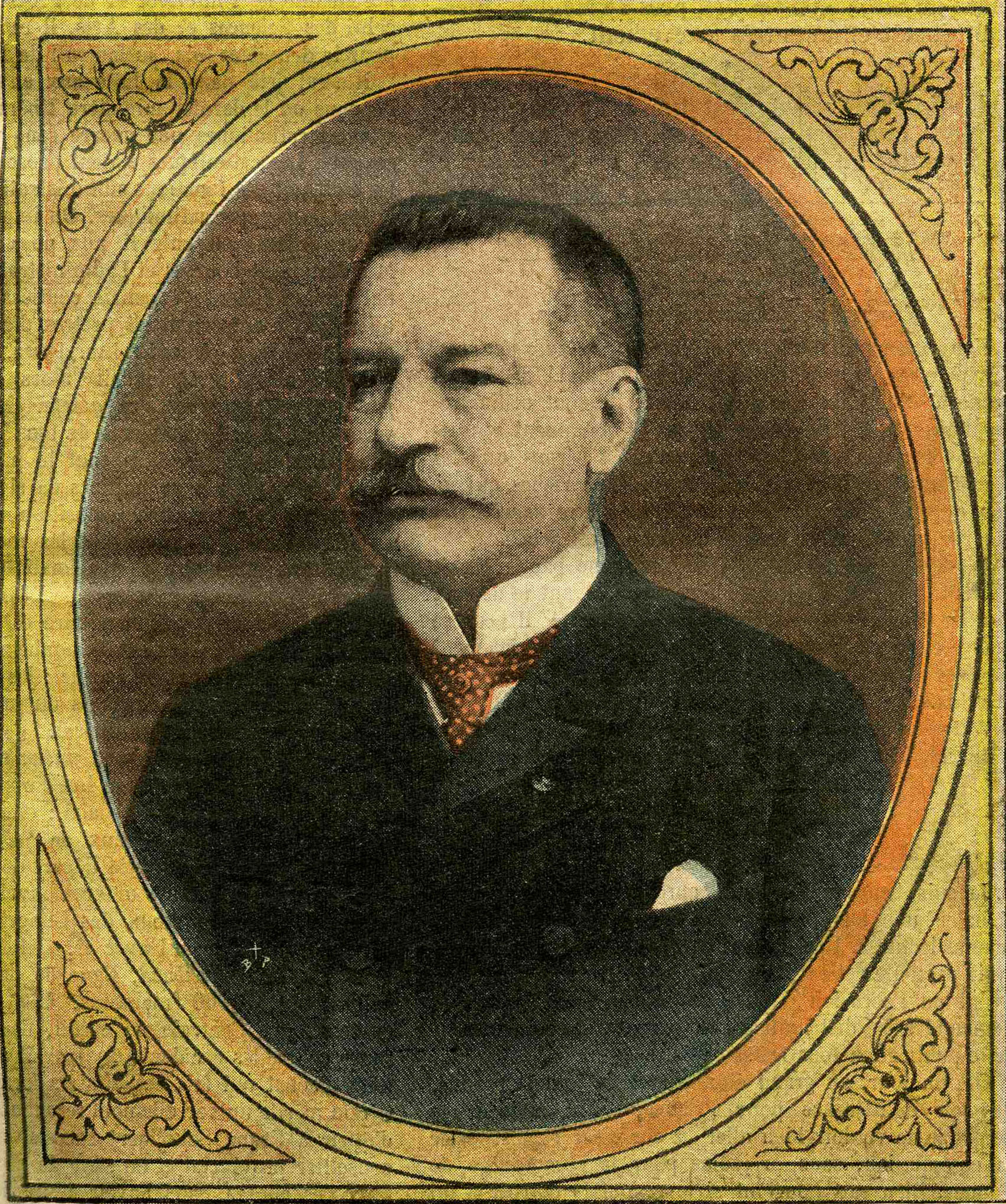

Prime Minister of Belgium
- In office 31 December 1907 – 17 June 1911
- Monarchs: Leopold II; Albert I
- Preceded by: Jules de Trooz
- Succeeded by: Charles de Broqueville

President of the Chamber of Representatives
- In office 12 November 1912 – 29 June 1917
- Preceded by: Gérard Cooreman
- Succeeded by: Prosper Poullet
- In office 12 November 1901 – 9 January 1908
- Preceded by: Louis Marie Joseph de Sadeleer
- Succeeded by: Gérard Cooreman

Personal details
- Born: 19 August 1851 Wilsele, Belgium
- Died: 29 June 1917 (aged 65) Sainte-Adresse, France
- Party: Catholic Party

François (Frans) Victor Marie Ghislain Schollaert (19 August 1851 – 29 June 1917) was a Belgian Catholic Party politician who served as Prime Minister of Belgium from 1907 to 1911.

Born in Wilsele, Schollaert trained as a lawyer and practiced in Leuven. He served as head of the Flemish farmer's union, the Boerenbond. He sat in the Belgian Chamber of People's Representatives from 1888 onwards, holding the office of President of the Chamber from 1901 to 1908, and from 1911 until his death.

On Jules de Trooz's sudden death on the last day of 1907, Schollaert replaced him as the prime minister of Belgium, also holding the Interior and Agriculture portfolios from 1908 to 1910, and the Arts and Science portfolio from 1910 to 1911. Schollaert was PM while the Belgian parliament, in heated debates, voted to annex the Congo Free State, which had been privately owned by Belgian King Leopold II. It became known as the Belgian Congo.

== Honours ==
- Belgium: Minister of State by Royal Decree.
- Belgium: Grand Cross in the Order of the Crown
- Belgium: Grand Officier in the Order of Leopold
- France: Grand Cross in the Legion of Honour
- Holy See: Grand Cross in the Order of Pius IX
- Norway: Grand Cross in the Order of Saint Olav
- Romania: Grand Cross in the Order of the Star of Romania

The Schollaert Channel, discovered in 1898 by the Belgian Antarctic Expedition under Gerlache, was named for him.

Political offices
Preceded by Louis Marie Joseph de Sadeleer	President of the Chamber of Representatives; 1901–1908	Succeeded by Gérard Cooreman
Preceded by Jules de Trooz	Prime Minister of Belgium; 1908–1911	Succeeded by Charles de Broqueville
Preceded by Gérard Cooreman	President of the Chamber of Representatives; 1912–1917	Succeeded by Prosper Poullet
