= Charles de Broqueville =

Belgian politician

Comte Charles de Broqueville
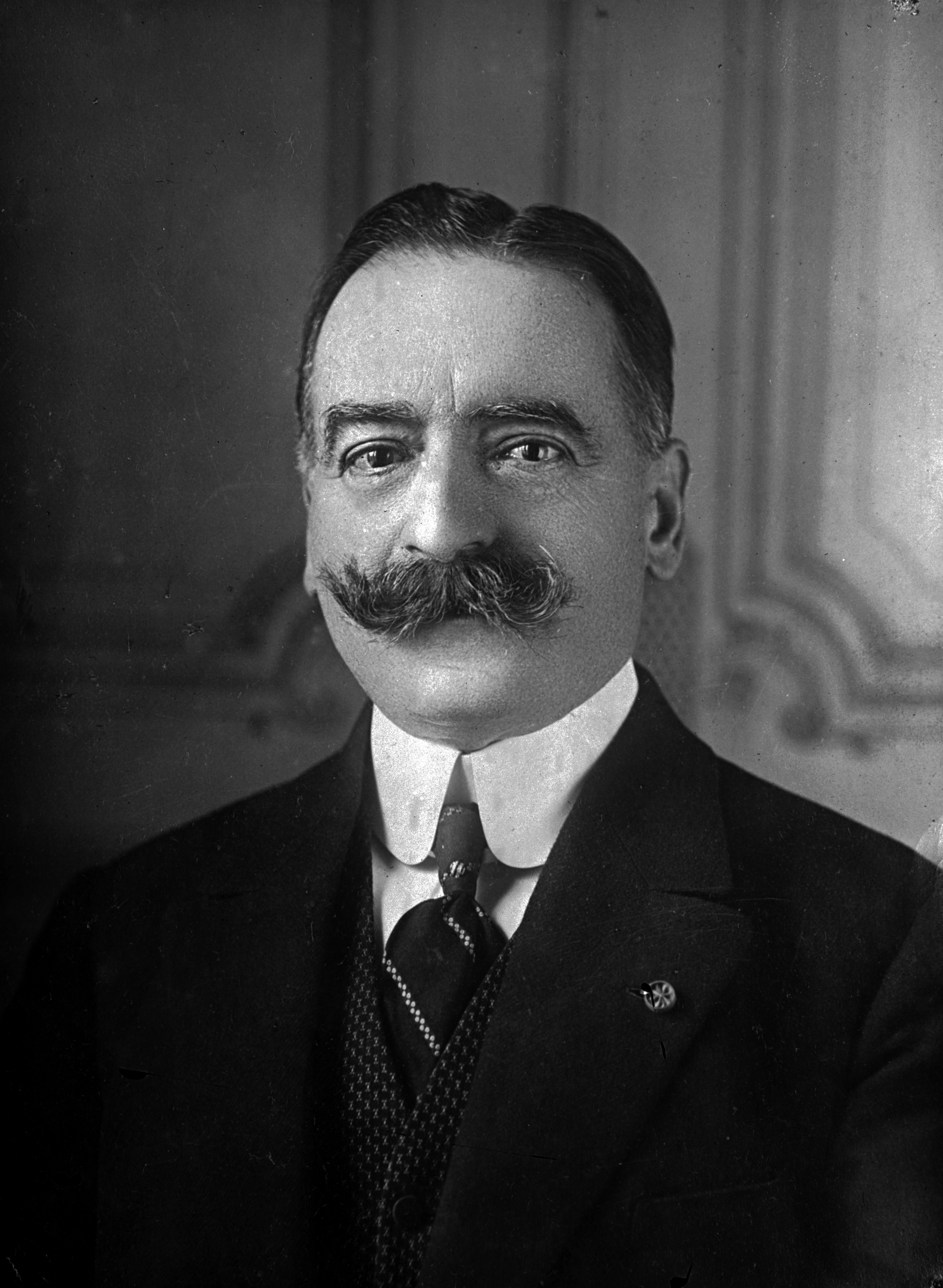

Prime Minister of Belgium
- In office 22 October 1932 – 20 November 1934
- Monarchs: Albert I Leopold III
- Preceded by: Jules Renkin
- Succeeded by: Georges Theunis
- In office 17 June 1911 – 1 June 1918
- Monarch: Albert I
- Preceded by: Frans Schollaert
- Succeeded by: Gérard Cooreman

Personal details
- Born: Charles Marie Pierre Albert de Broqueville; 4 December 1860 Postel, Belgium
- Died: 5 September 1940 (aged 79) Brussels, German-occupied Belgium
- Party: Catholic Party

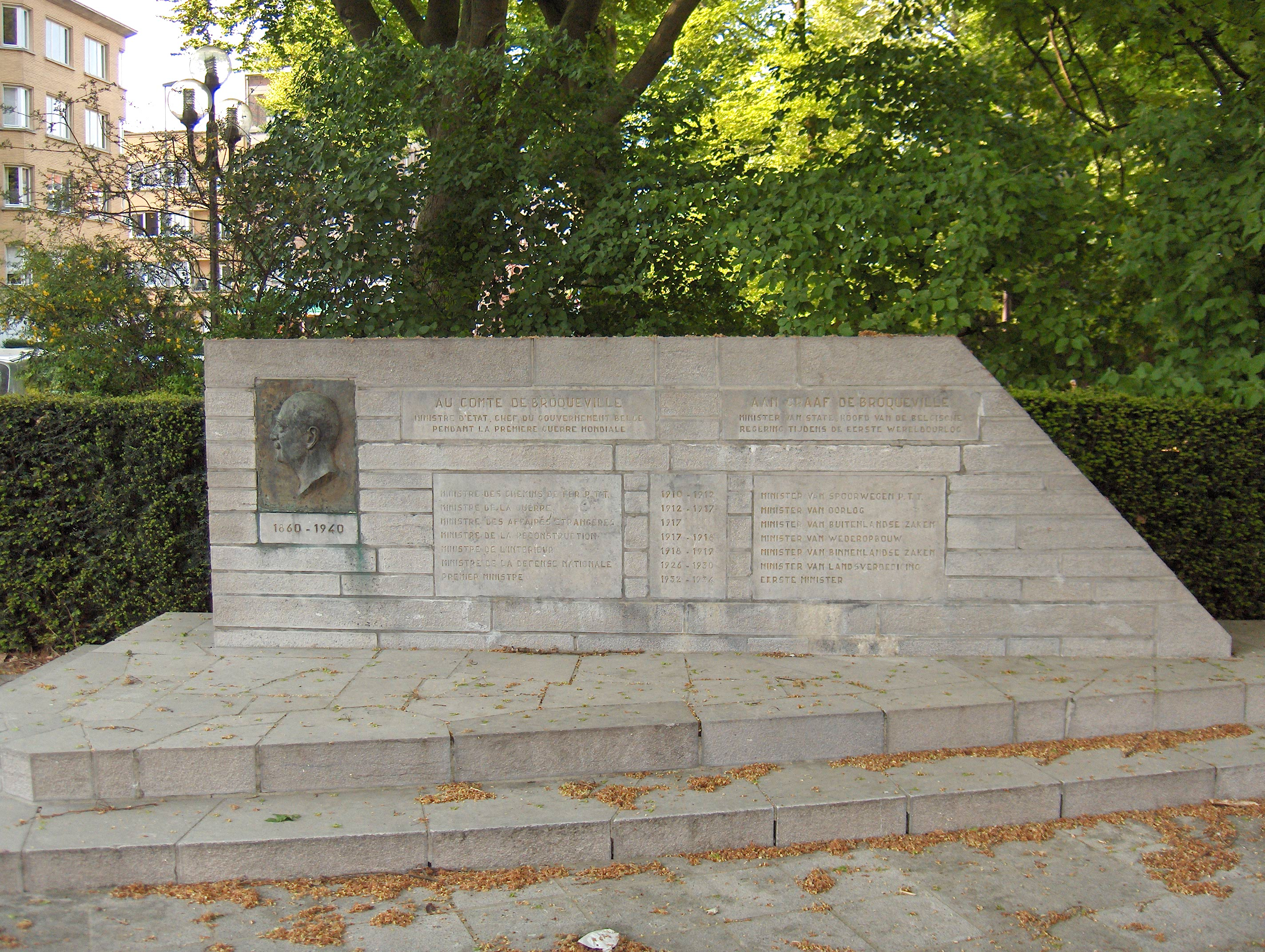
Memorial to Charles de Broqueville on Avenue de Broqueville, Woluwe-Saint-Lambert, Brussels

Comte Charles de Broqueville (French pronunciation: [ʃaʁl də bʁɔkvil]; 4 December 1860 – 5 September 1940) was the prime minister of Belgium from 1911 to 1918 and again from 1932 to 1934, serving during the majority of World War I.

== Before 1914 ==
Charles de Broqueville was born into an old noble family with its roots in French Gascony. He was the son of Count Stanislas de Broqueville (1830–1919) and Claire de Briey (1832–1876). He received a private education from Catholic priest Charles Simon, from which he also learned Dutch. He married Berthe d'Huart (1864–1937), a granddaughter of Catholic statesman Jules Malou, through whom he gained further connections to politics.

First elected to the Chamber of Representatives in the 1892 election, he represented the arrondissement of Turnhout until June 1919. He was seen as part of de jonge rechterzijde (the young right-wing), and was politically a midway between Christian democracy and more traditional forms of conservatism.

The leader of Belgium's Catholic Party, he served as prime minister between 1911 and 1918 and headed the de Broqueville government.

Once it became clear that Germany intended to violate Belgian neutrality in August 1914, he oversaw Belgium's mobilization for war. Despite the mobilization, de Broqueville opposed King Albert I's proposal to deploy the Belgian Army along the German frontier in 1914 but strategically placed them throughout the country. He recognized that wartime support for Belgium depended upon its continued status as a nonprovocative neutral power.

During the war, de Broqueville was more willing to make concessions to the Flemish Movement than King Albert, in order to secure Belgian unity in the long term. He made several promises to the movements after the war, such as the Dutchification of Ghent University and better conditions for the Dutch language in standard education.

== First World War ==
The German invasion of 1914 forced the Belgian government into exile at Le Havre. De Broqueville fought the King on the neutrality issue and so denied Belgium a full alliance with the Allied forces.

The opposition of the King critically weakened de Broqueville's stance among members of his cabinet. Consequently, he resigned as Foreign Secretary in January 1918 and as Prime Minister in May when he lost the support of his own party.

De Broqueville also served as minister in various departments:

- Minister of Railways and PTT (Posts, Telegraphs and Telephones) 1910–1912
- Minister of War 1912–1917
- Minister of Foreign Affairs 1917
- Minister of Reconstruction 1917–1918
- Minister of the Interior 1918–1919
- Minister of National Defence 1926–1930

== Postwar ==
Later, Charles de Broqueville became Prime Minister a second time, serving from 22 October 1932 to 20 November 1934. He died on 5 September 1940, during the second German occupation of Belgium.

== Titles, honours and arms ==
=== Titles ===
- 1867 – 1919: Baron Charles de Broqueville
- 1919 – 1920: Charles, Baron de Broqueville
- After 1920: Charles, Count de Broqueville

=== National honours ===
Ribbon bar	Honour	Date
	Croix de Guerre	
	Grand Cordon of the Order of Leopold	1919
	Minister of State	

=== Foreign honours ===
Ribbon bar	Country	Honour	Date	Post-nominals
	Baden	Knight Grand Cross of the Order of the Zähringer Lion		
	Denmark	Knight of the Order of the Dannebrog		
	France	Grand Croix of the Légion d'honneur		
	France	Croix de Guerre		
	Greece	Grand Cross of the Order of the Redeemer		
	Holy See	Knight with the Collar of the Order of Pius IX		
	Kingdom of Italy	Knight Grand Cross of the Order of Saints Maurice and Lazarus		
	Empire of Japan	1st class in the Order of the Rising Sun		
	Luxembourg	Grand Cross of the Order of the Oak Crown		
	Netherlands	Knight Grand Cross of the Order of the Netherlands Lion		
	Portugal	Knight Grand Cross of the Portuguese Order of Christ (Portugal)		GCC
	Romania	Knight Grand Cross of the Order of the Crown of Romania		
	Russian Empire	Knight of the Order of the White Eagle		
	UK	Knight Grand Cross of the Order of St Michael and St George		GCMG

=== Arms ===
Coat of arms of the Count de Broqueville
Coronet A Belgian Count's coronet Escutcheon Azure, a saltire or, in chief, a six-pointed star or Motto Quis me fortior aut fidelior

== See also ==
- List of prime ministers of Belgium
- List of defence ministers of Belgium
- Belgium in World War I
- Belgian nationalism

== Sources ==
- Louis DE LICHTERVELDE, Charles de Broqueville, in: Biographie Nationale de Belgique, t. XXIX, 1956–1957, p. 369-377.
- Paul VAN MOLLE, La parlement belge, 1894-1972, Antwerp, 1972
- Luc SCHEPENS, Albert Ier et le gouvernement Broqueville, 1914–1918 : aux origines de la question communautaire. Paris 1983,
- Thierry DENOËL, Le nouveau dictionnaire des Belges, 2e éd. revue et augm., Brussels, Le Cri, 1992, p. 167.
- Maria DE WAELE, Charles de Broqueville, in: Nieuwe Encyclopedie van de Vlaamse Beweging, Tielt, 1998
- Paul VOS, Charles de Broqueville op de kering der tijden, in: Vlaamse Stam, 2012, blz. 122-142.
- Frans RENAERS, De opvoeding van Charles de Broqueville, in: Vlaamse Stam, blz 142-145.

Political offices
Preceded by Frans Schollaert	Prime Minister of Belgium; 1911–1918	Succeeded by Gérard Cooreman
Preceded by Jules Renkin	Prime Minister of Belgium; 1932–1934	Succeeded by Georges Theunis
