= Prosper Poullet =

Belgian politician

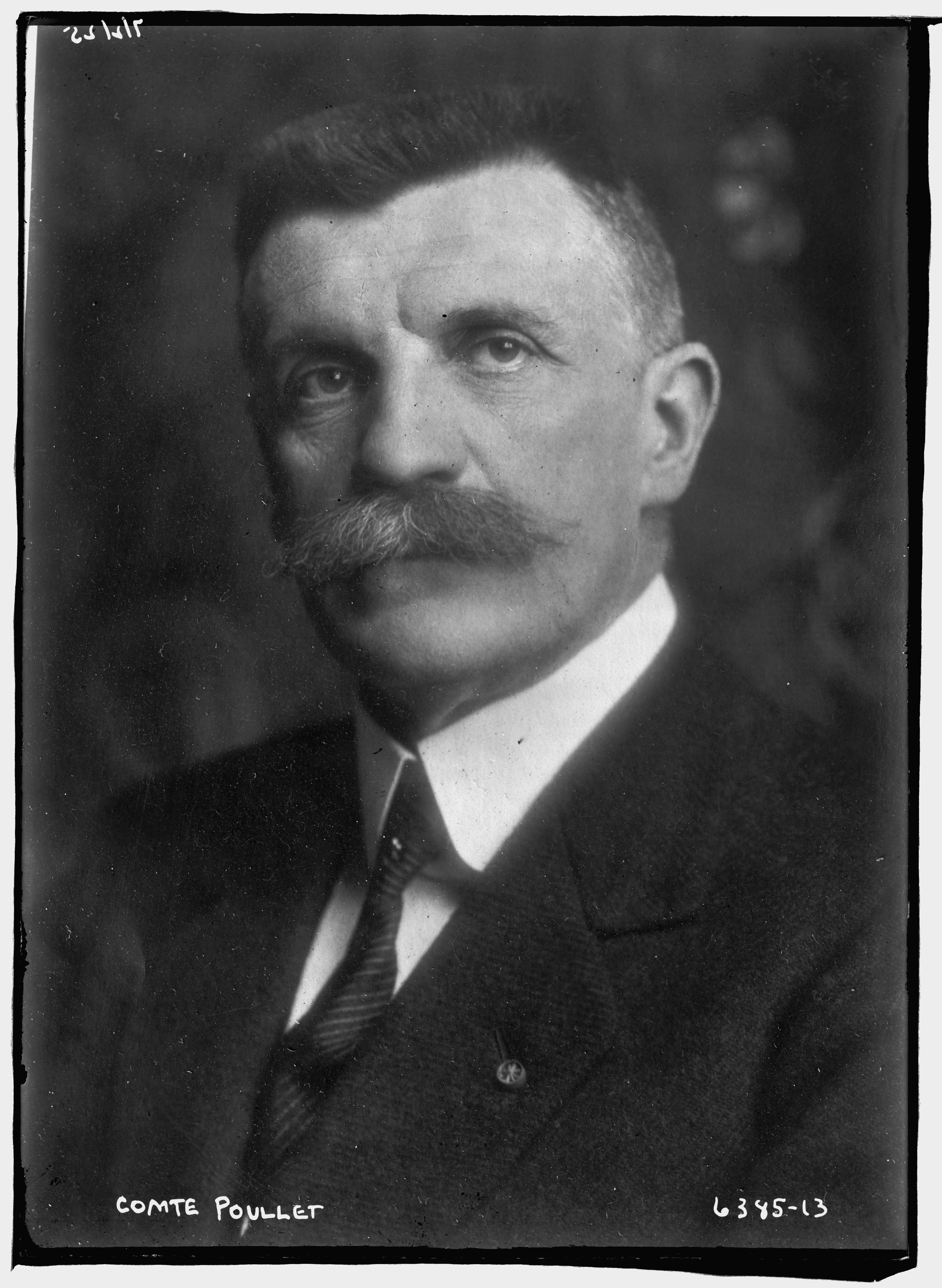

Prime Minister of Belgium
- In office 17 June 1925 – 20 May 1926
- Monarch: Albert I
- Preceded by: Aloys Van de Vyvere
- Succeeded by: Henri Jaspar

President of the Chamber of Representatives
- In office 29 June 1917 – 10 December 1919
- Preceded by: Frans Schollaert
- Succeeded by: Emile Brunet

Personal details
- Born: 5 March 1868 Leuven, Belgium
- Died: 3 December 1937 (aged 69) Leuven, Belgium
- Political party: Catholic Party

Prosper Antoine Marie Joseph, Viscount Poullet (5 March 1868 – 3 December 1937) was a Belgian politician who served as the Prime Minister of Belgium from 1925 to 1926, and as President of the Chamber of Representatives from 1917 to 1919.

== Early life ==
Prosper Antoine Joseph Marie, Viscount Poullet was born in Leuven, Belgium, on 5 March 1868. Antoine Ernst, his maternal grandfather, was a minister and his father Edmond was a professor and historian. Poullet was of French aristocratic descent and a member of the Catholic Church. He was one of the few French-speaking aristocrats that also spoke Flemish.

From 1879 to 1884, Poullet was educated at a secondary school managed by the Josephites of Belgium in Leuven. He obtained a doctorate in law in 1890, and practiced law in Brussels. At the School of Political and Social Sciences he was a lecturer from 1893 to 1898, and a professor at the Leuven law faculty from 1898 to 1936. The Association of Flemish Lawyers was chaired by Poullet from 1927 to 1930.

== Career ==
A member of the Catholic Party, Poullet served as a provincial councillor in Brabant from 1900 to 1908, and as a municipal councillor in Leuven from 1904 to 1911.

In the 1908 election Poullet was elected to the Belgian Federal Parliament and served until 1937. From 1918 to 1919, he was president of the Chamber of Representatives. He held the minstrial positions of Arts and Sciences from 1911 to 1918, Railways and Post and Telecommunications from 1919 to 1920 and 1932 to 1934, Interior from 1924 to 1925 and 1932 to 1933, Economic Affairs from 1925 to 1926, and War in 1926.

As Minister of Arts and Sciences Poullet raised the age of compulsory school from 12 to 14. The eight hour work day was implemented by Poullet as Minister of Railways.

After World War I Poullet became interested in the Flemish question and promoted Flemish nationalism. He supported unilingual policies and asked King Albert I of Belgium to permit the Flemish to have a university. When a government was formed in 1920, Albert pushed to exclude Poullet and other Flemish supporters.

On 17 June 1925, a government was formed by the Catholics and Belgian Labour Party with Poullet as prime minister; this was the first coalition between the two parties. A financial crisis occurred during his tenure as the government ended after eleven months on 8 May 1926.

== Personal life ==
Viscountess Marie Louise de Monge married Poullet in 1894. The title of Viscount was given to him in 1925. Poullet died in Leuven, on 3 December 1937. Poullet's library of historical, philosophical, and lecture works and notes were given to the library of KU Leuven in 1945, and partially moved to UCLouvain in 1970.

== Works cited ==
- "Prosper Poullet Collection". KU Leuven. Archived from the original on 21 June 2025.
- "Poullet, Prosper". Encyclopedia of the Flemish Movement. Archived from the original on 21 June 2025.

Political offices
Preceded by Frans Schollaert	President of the Chamber of Representatives; 1917–1919	Succeeded by Emile Brunet
Preceded by Aloys Van de Vyvere	Prime Minister of Belgium; 1925–1926	Succeeded by Henri Jaspar
