= Gérard Cooreman =

Belgian politician

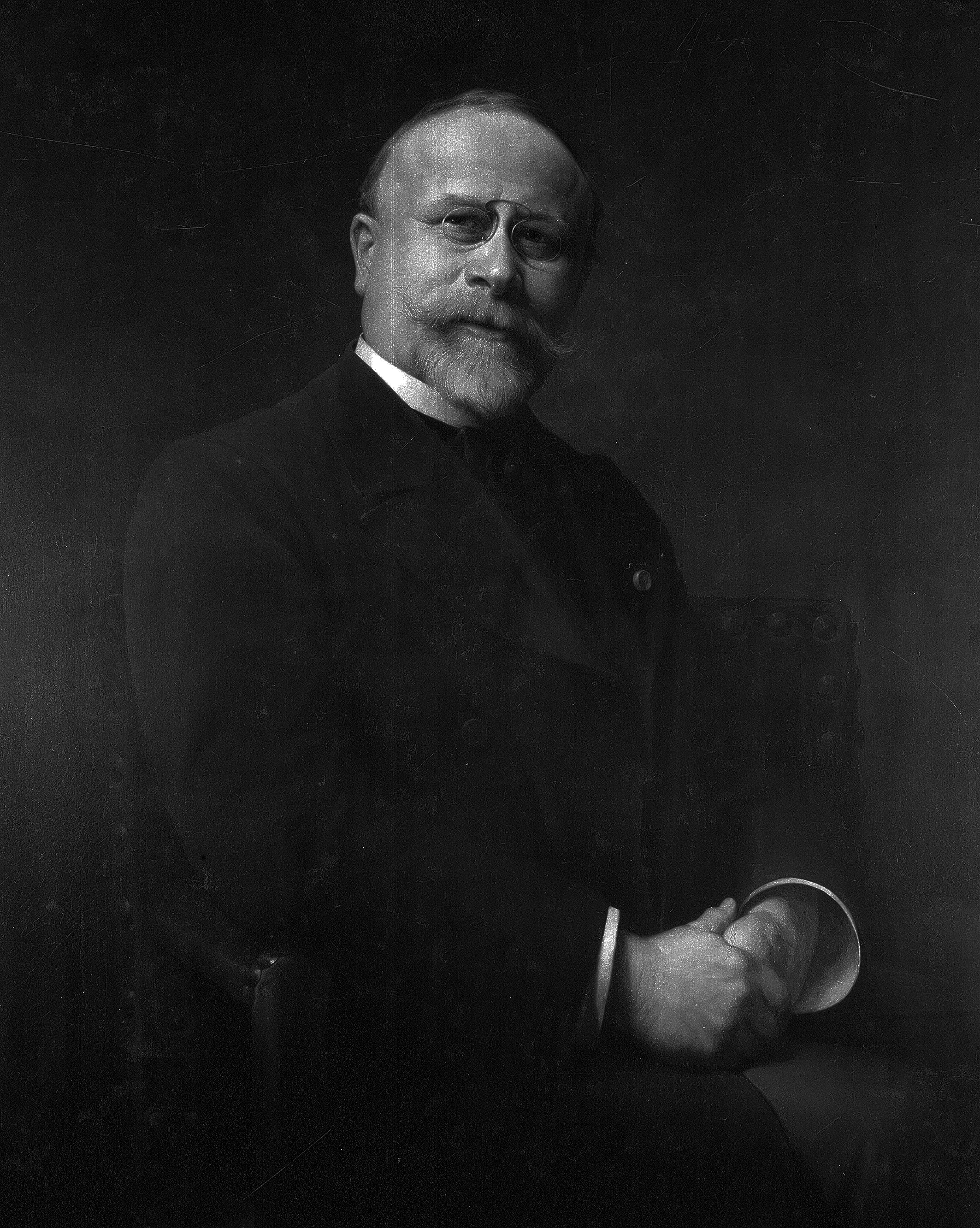

Prime Minister of Belgium
- In office 1 June 1918 – 21 November 1918
- Monarch: Albert I
- Preceded by: Charles de Broqueville
- Succeeded by: Léon Delacroix

President of the Chamber of Representatives
- In office 9 January 1908 – 12 November 1912
- Preceded by: Frans Schollaert
- Succeeded by: Frans Schollaert

Personal details
- Born: 25 March 1852 Ghent, Belgium
- Died: 2 December 1926 (aged 74) Brussels, Belgium
- Party: Catholic Party

Gérard (Gerard) François Marie Cooreman (25 March 1852 – 2 December 1926) was a Belgian Catholic Party politician who served as Prime Minister of Belgium from June to November 1918.

Born in Ghent, Cooreman was trained in law, and practiced as a lawyer, but was more active as a businessman and financier, and became involved with Catholic social groups.

In 1892 Cooreman was elected to the Belgian Senate, and from 1898 to 1914 he represented Ghent in the Belgian Chamber of Representatives, holding the position of leader of the Chamber from 1908 to 1912.

He held office as Labour and Industry minister for a short time in 1899, and on the fall of Frans Schollaert's government in 1911 he was asked to become the prime minister of Belgium and form the new government, but declined. He was appointed an honorary Minister of State in 1912 and left politics in 1914 to become a director of the Société Générale de Belgique.

During the First World War, Cooreman followed the Belgian government into exile at Le Havre. On the fall of Charles de Broqueville, King Albert I of Belgium appointed Cooreman to lead a new government on 1 June 1918. With the end of the war in November 1918, Cooreman resigned as the prime minister.

== Honours ==
- Belgium: Minister of State, by Royal Decree.
- Belgium: Grand Cordon in the Order of Leopold, By royal Decree of 1918.
- France: Knight grand Cross in the Legion of Honour
- Sweden: Knight grand Cross in the Order of the Polar Star
- United Kingdom: Knight grand Cross in the Royal Victorian Order
- Japan: Knight grand Cross in the Imperial Order of the Rising Sun
- Knight Commander in the Order of Pius IX

Political offices
Preceded by Frans Schollaert	President of the Chamber of Representatives; 1908–1912	Succeeded by Frans Schollaert
Preceded by Charles de Broqueville	Prime Minister of Belgium; 1918	Succeeded by Léon Delacroix
