= Léon Delacroix =

Belgian politician (1867–1929)

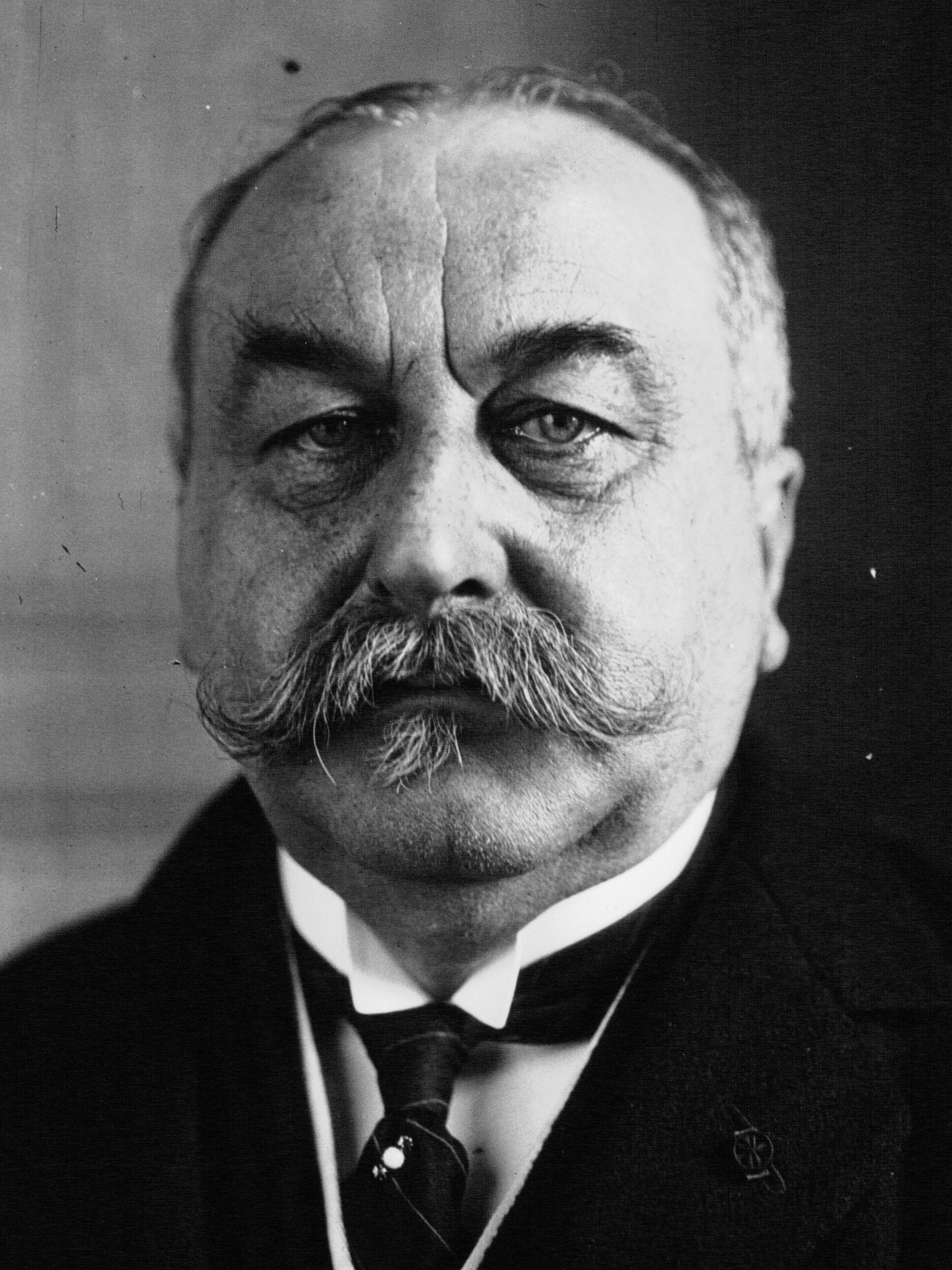
- Delacroix in 1924

Prime Minister of Belgium
- In office 21 November 1918 – 20 November 1920
- Monarch: Albert I
- Preceded by: Gérard Cooreman
- Succeeded by: Henry Carton de Wiart

Personal details
- Born: 27 December 1867; Saint-Josse-ten-Noode, Belgium
- Died: 15 October 1929 (aged 61); Baden-Baden, Germany
- Political party: Catholic Party

Léon Frédéric Gustave Delacroix (French pronunciation: [leɔ̃ fʁedeʁik ɡystav dəlakʁwa]; 27 December 1867 – 15 October 1929) was a Belgian statesman. Before entering politics, he was a renowned lawyer, and served as president of the Belgian Court of Cassation from 1917 to 1918. In the context of reconstruction after World War I, he was appointed the prime minister and served from 1918 to 1920. During his term, universal suffrage for men was enacted. He was also the minister of Finance from 1918 to 1920.

== See also ==
- Bank for International Settlements

Political offices
Preceded by Gérard Cooreman	Prime Minister of Belgium; 1918–1920	Succeeded by Henry Carton de Wiart
