= Prime Minister of Belgium =

Head of government

Prime Minister of the Kingdom of Belgium
- Eerste Minister van België (Dutch); Premier Ministre de Belgique (French); Premierminister von Belgien (German)
- Coat of arms

- State ensign

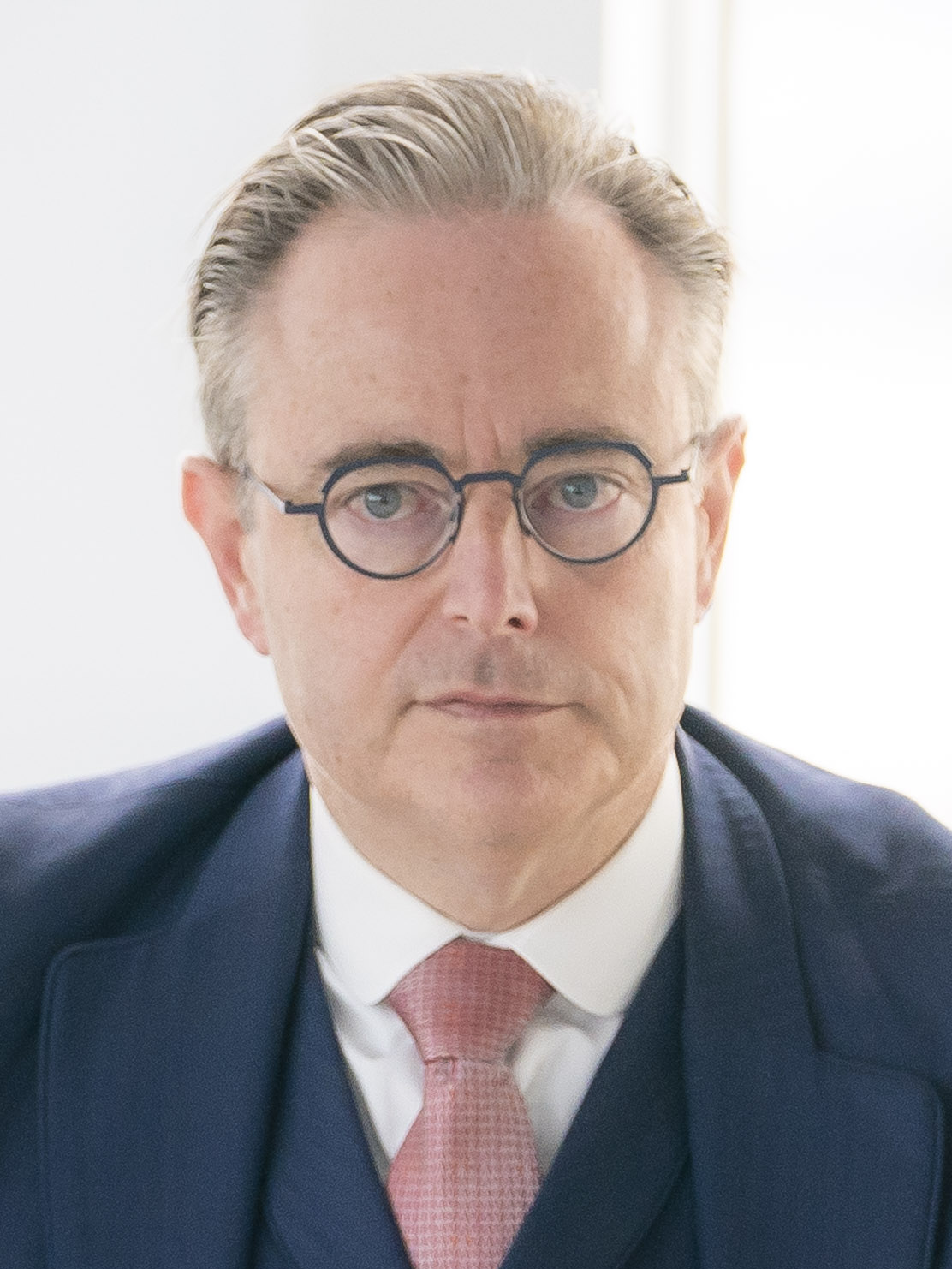
- Incumbent; Bart De Wever since 3 February 2025
- Executive branch of the Belgian Federal Government
- Style: Mr Prime Minister (informal); His Excellency (diplomatic)
- Member of: Belgian Federal Cabinet; European Council
- Residence: Le Lambermont, Brussels
- Seat: 16, Rue de la Loi, Brussels
- Appointer: Monarch of Belgium
- Term length: No term limit
- Formation: 26 February 1831; 195 years ago (de facto); 1918; 108 years ago (de jure)
- First holder: Étienne de Gerlache
- Unofficial names: Premier of Belgium
- Salary: €236,900 annually
- Website: premier.be

The prime minister of Belgium (Dutch: Eerste minister van België; French: Premier ministre de Belgique; German: Premierminister von Belgien) or the premier of Belgium is the head of the federal government of Belgium, and the most powerful person in Belgian politics.

The first head of government in Belgian history was Henri van der Noot in 1790, during the brief existence of the United Belgian States. Although Leaders of Government (French: Chefs de Cabinet) had been appointed since Belgium's independence, it was not until after World War I that the modern role of prime minister began to take shape. Before 1918, the king of the Belgians often presided over the Council of Ministers, but with the appointment of Léon Delacroix, the premiership gained prominence. Over time, the political influence of the Crown has diminished, while the role of the prime minister has become increasingly significant.

Bart De Wever, the (former) leader of New-Flemish Alliance, was appointed as new prime minister on 3 February 2025. He is the first Flemish Nationalist to ever become Premier of Belgium. He succeeded Alexander De Croo.

== History ==
In 1790, the Sovereign Congress of the States of Belgium sat in Brussels and was composed of representatives from each of the eight provinces. Henri van der Noot served as President of the National Congress, retaining the title of Minister Plenipotentiary having previously held the title Minister Plenipotentiary of Brabant.

Since the independence of Belgium in 1830, governments have been designated with the name of the minister who formed the government as formateur, but that position did not have a specific status. Originally, from 1831 the king of the Belgians presided over the Council of Ministers, but when he was absent, the presidency was taken by the chef de cabinet (head of Cabinet), usually the oldest or most influential minister. This position gradually became more prominent, and the minister with this title then soon acquired the competency to present the king with the proposed allocation of the various ministerial departments among the ministers.

With the expansion of voting rights after World War I, more political parties started to win seats in parliament—especially the Belgian Socialist Party—and this made it impossible to achieve an absolute majority in parliament. Since then, coalition governments have been necessary, which has made the task of forming a government by the appointed formateur more difficult. Consequently, the formateur increasingly gained greater respect, and much prestige. Thus the formateur became prominent as a position of leadership. As the ministers of the government now represented various political parties, there was a need for someone to coordinate the proceedings of the various ministers. The prime minister was now asserted as the actual head of government, and this is how the office of prime minister came into existence.

Gradually, the head of Cabinet replaced the king more often during the first half of the twentieth century, and as such gained importance within government. As the Constitution requires the king to exercise his powers through the ministers, the prime minister became reckoned as the country's most important political figure and de facto chief executive. Nevertheless, given his newly acquired prominence, as a member of the Cabinet the head of Cabinet continued to lead a ministerial department.

The title of Prime Minister or Premier was used for the first time in 1918 in official documents and it is at this time that the position was assigned to its own cabinet. Only in 1970 the title was incorporated in the Belgian Constitution with the first state reform.

== Function ==
Besides coordinating government policies, the prime minister is responsible for the proper execution of the coalition agreement. The prime minister also presides at meetings of the Council of Ministers and manages conflicts of competencies between the ministers. In addition, the prime minister represents the government coalition in public, both at home and abroad. It is the prime minister who maintains contact with the king and presents the government policy statement in the Parliament. The prime minister can also ask Parliament for a vote of confidence, which can even lead to the government's resignation in the case of a constructive vote of no confidence. Unless the prime minister resigns because of a personal matter, the whole government resigns with the prime minister's resignation. The prime minister also represents Belgium in the various international organisations, alongside the minister of foreign affairs. Due to the state reform, the prime minister acquired a number of additional tasks, such as keeping in check the relations between the different regions and communities of the country, and presiding at the deliberative committee that consists of the governmental representatives of all the federal entities.

It is expected, though not required, that the prime minister be fluent in both French and Dutch.

== Appointment ==
The day after the federal elections, the incumbent prime minister offers the resignation of his government to the king. The king then asks the resigning government to continue as a caretaker government until a new government is formed. The king then consults a number of prominent politicians in order to ascertain the different possibilities of forming a government. He usually consults the presidents of the Chamber of Representatives and the Senate, the most important political parties, and other people of political and socio-economic importance. After the consultations, the king appoints an informateur who is in charge of collecting information from the different political parties about their demands for formation of a new government. After these consultations, the informateur reports to the king so that the king can find a suitable formateur, who is responsible for forming the government. Usually, it is the formateur of the federal government who then becomes prime minister.

It usually takes several months of negotiations before the formateur is ready to accept a formal royal invitation to form a government. Per the Constitution, the king's acts are only valid with the countersignature of a minister. For this reason, the outgoing prime minister countersigns the Act of Appointment of the new prime minister, and the new prime minister countersigns the Act of Resignation of the resigning prime minister. The king then appoints the other ministers and secretaries of state of the federal government, and their Acts of Appointment are countersigned by the prime minister.

== Official office ==
The official office of the prime minister is located at 16 Rue de la Loi (Wetstraat in Dutch, or "Law Street" in translation) among many notable Belgian government and European Union buildings in the centre of Brussels and around Brussels Park. The residence includes the Belgian Federal Cabinet, the Chancellery and the Council of Ministers. It functions as the nerve center of Belgian politics. The building was originally erected as the so-called "Refuge House" by the Saint Gertrude Abbey of Leuven. It was designed by the Belgian-Austrian architect Louis Joseph Montoyer. At the time of the United Kingdom of the Netherlands (1815–1830), the building was planned to be used as the location for the Ministry of Foreign Affairs. In 1830 it was purchased by Prince Eugène of Ligne, and from 1944, the building became state property, after which it was furnished to function as a meeting place for the prime minister and his cabinet.

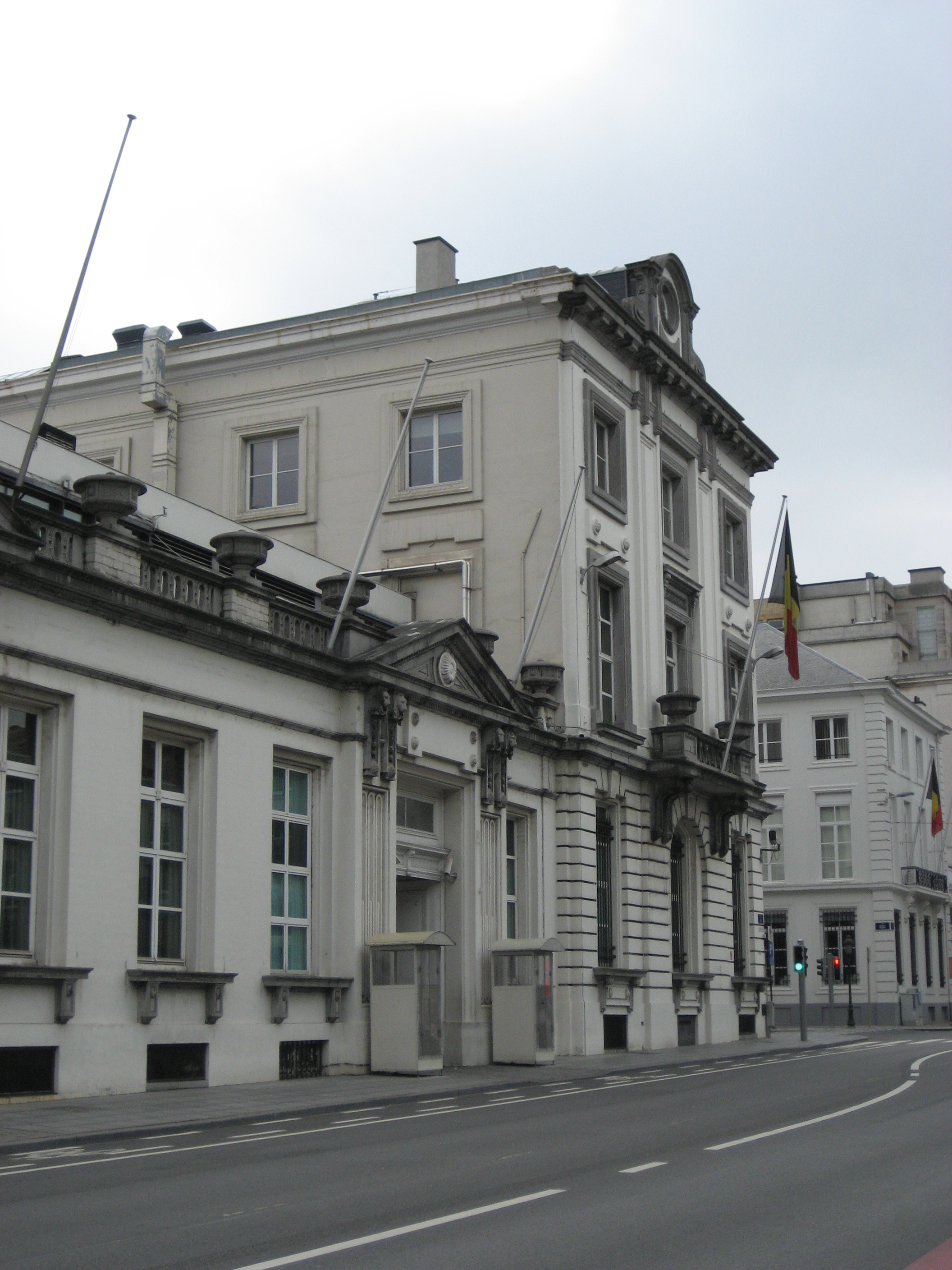
The office of the Belgian prime minister

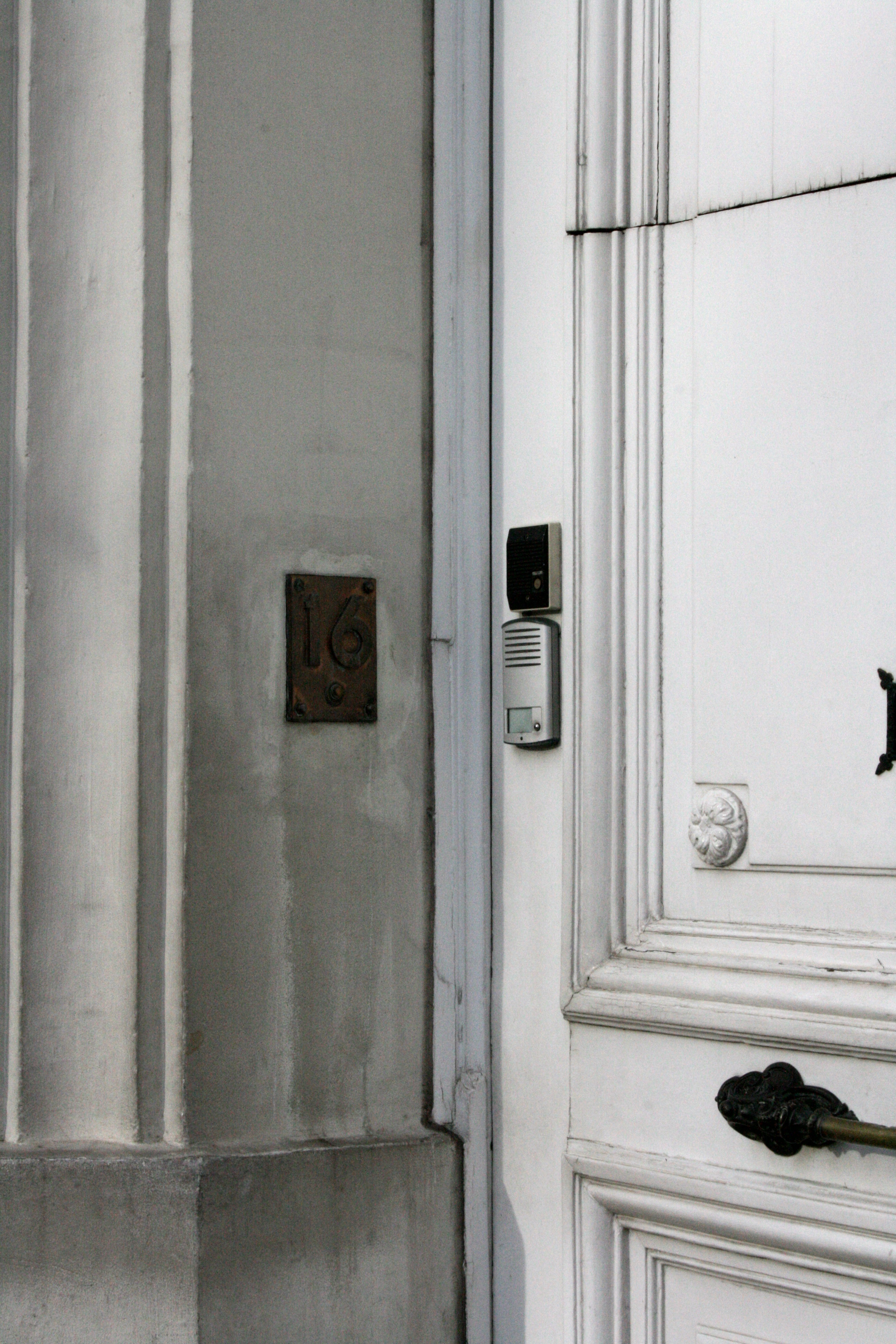
The entrance

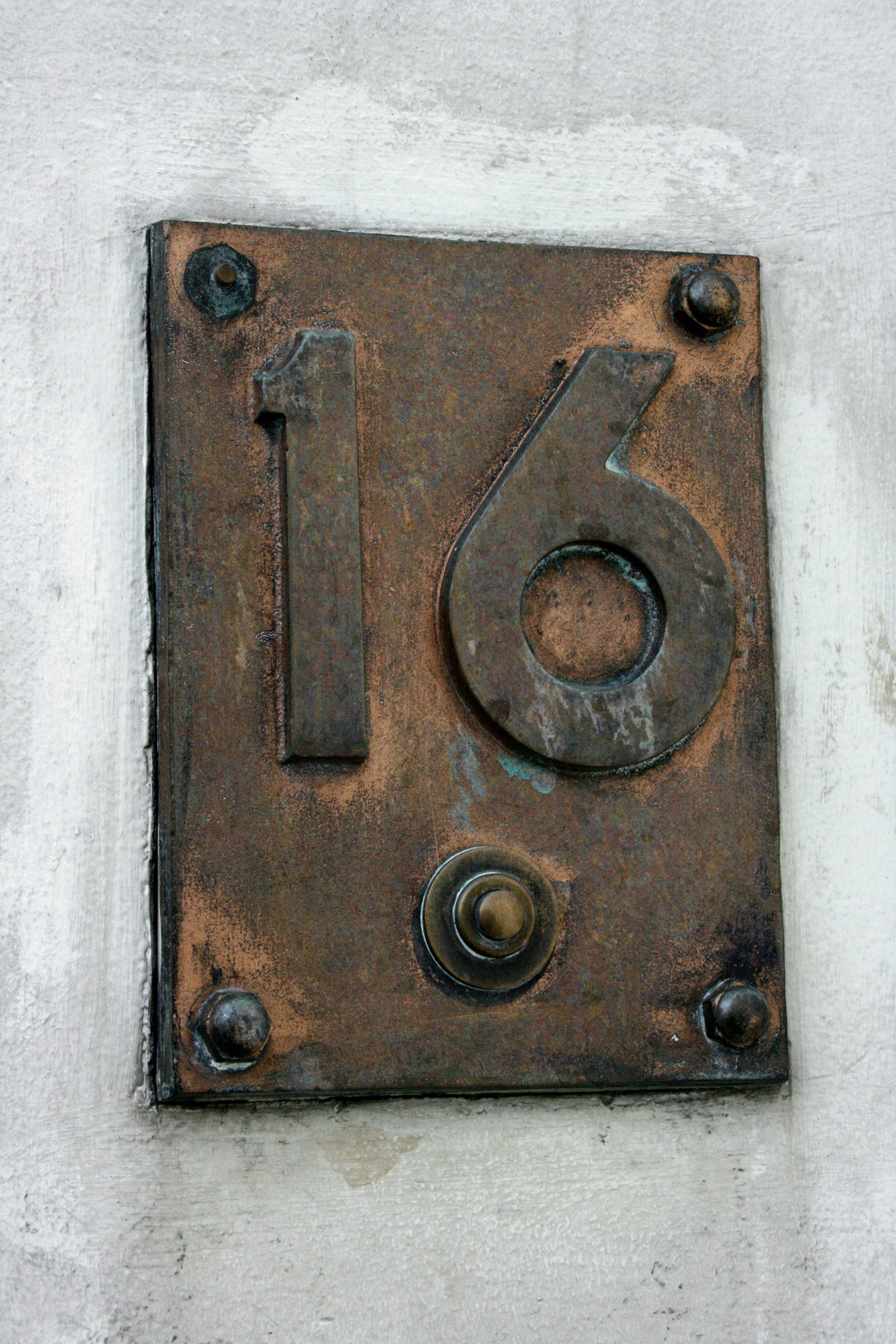
The doorbell

== See also ==
- List of Belgian monarchs
- List of prime ministers of Belgium
- List of prime ministers of Belgium by political affiliation
- List of prime ministers of Belgium by time in office
- Lifespan timeline of prime ministers of Belgium
- Minister-President of the Brussels-Capital Region
- Minister-President of Flanders
- Minister-President of Wallonia
- Minister-President of the French Community
- Minister-President of the German-speaking Community
- History of Belgium
- Royal Question
